= 2026 Bolivian protests =

Anti-government mass protests

- Part of the Gen Z protests
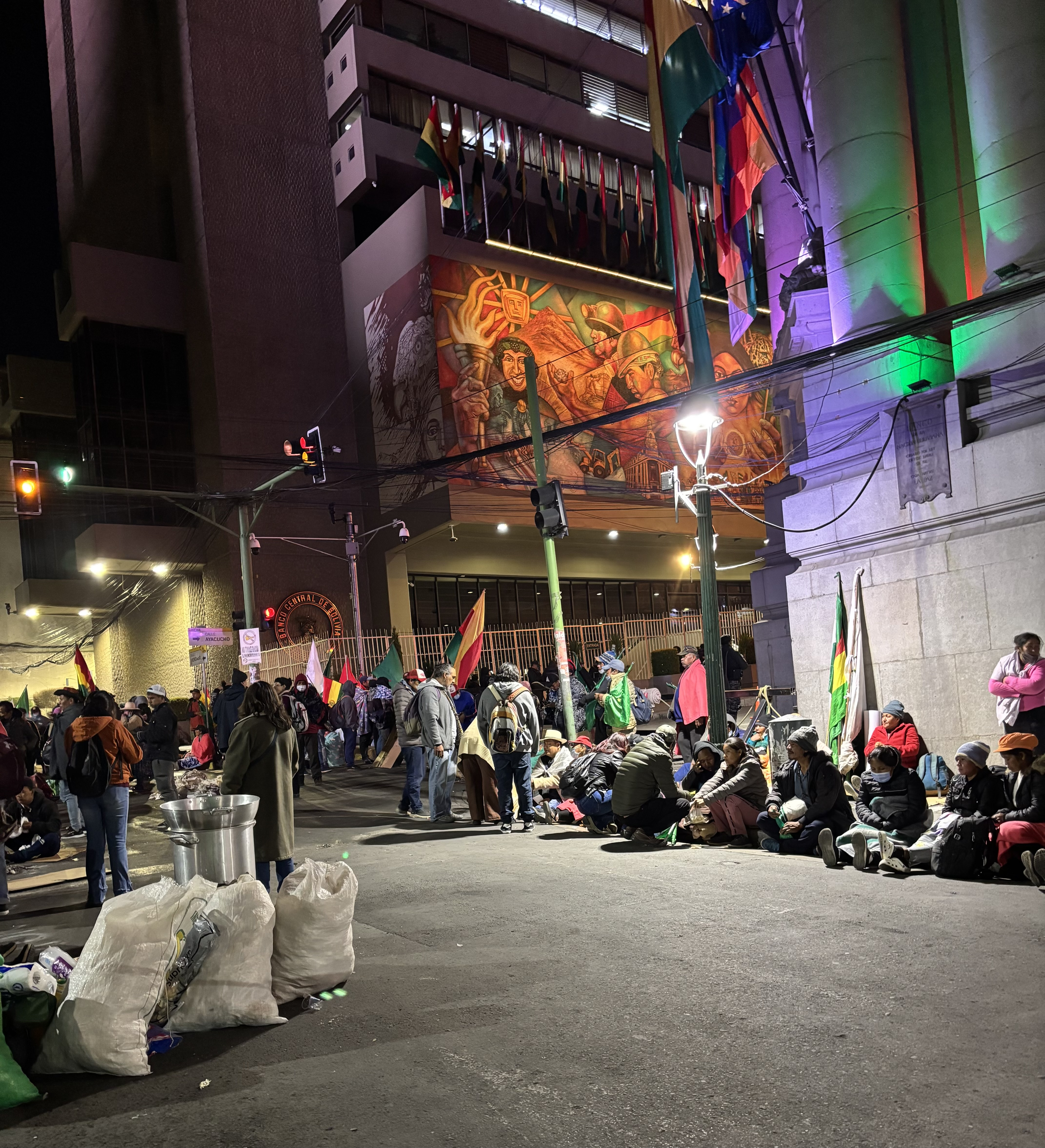
- Indigenous leaders holding a vigil in La Paz
- Date: 1 May – 23 June 2026 (1 month, 1 week and 5 days)
- Location: Bolivia (mainly in the La Paz region)
- Caused by: Economic and fuel crisis
- Goals: Resignation of Rodrigo Paz; Restoring fuel subsidies; Labor reforms; Repealing Law 1720
- Methods: Demonstrations, riots, civil resistance, civil disobedience, blockades, vandalism, strike actions, ambushes, occupation, looting, arson
- Result: Deal struck between Bolivian Workers' Center and the government, all blockades cleared

Parties
Protesters; Labor and civil unions: Bolivian Workers' Center; Unified Syndical Confederation of Peasant Workers of Bolivia; FEJUVE; Federación Túpac Katari; Political organizations: Pro-Evo Morales protesters; EVO Pueblo; Red Ponchos; Movimiento al Socialismo	Government of Bolivia; Bolivian Armed Forces; Bolivian Army; Bolivian National Police; Christian Democratic Party; Counter-protesters; Supported by: Argentina; Chile; Ecuador

Lead figures
Evo Morales; Leonardo Loza	Rodrigo Paz

Casualties
- Deaths: 24 (as of 9 July 2026)
- Injuries: 37 (as of 20 June 2026)
- Arrested: 583 (as of 2 July 2026)

The 2026 Bolivian protests were a series of mass protests that occurred in Bolivia in May and June, involving widespread demonstrations, blockades, and strikes in multiple regions across Bolivia that targeted major cities. They were led and participated predominantly by indigenous groups. Led largely by miners, they were joined by teachers, farmers, and other workers. The protests were sparked by Law 1720, a law allowing land to be used as collateral for loans, against the backdrop of a wider economic downturn in Bolivia. Although President Rodrigo Paz annulled the law on 13 May, protests continued to spread. The scope of the protests also expanded, with workers demanding higher wages, labour reform, and Paz's resignation.

Beginning on 14 May, protesters detonated explosives and clashed with police around the presidential palace. Road blockades also escalated, putting the cities of La Paz, El Alto, and Cochabamba under "siege", effectively isolating the cities and preventing essential goods from reaching them. During the protests, Bolivia's labour minister, defence minister, and education minister resigned.

On 19 June, the Paz administration and the Bolivian Workers' Center (COB) reached an agreement to establish sectoral working groups and move toward the suspension of the protest measures. Hours later, the government declared a nationwide state of emergency for a period of ninety days, temporarily restricting mass gatherings and banning road blockades. By 23 June, all blockade points had been lifted, and only road-clearing operations remained on some routes.

The total economic losses from the 53 days of blockades was estimated to be Bs. 14 billion, with the damage to infrastructure across the country being estimated to cost Bs. 150 million. At least 24 people were killed and 37 injured as of 9 July and 20 June, respectively. In response to the economic damage from the protests, the government ended the Bolivian boliviano's peg to the US dollar, establishing a floating exchange rate on 29 June. Hundreds of legal cases were opened against protest leaders, with the leader of Túpac Katari being arrested in early July.

== Background ==
Bolivia's economic crisis, resulting from declining energy production and a shortage of U.S. dollars, is the worst in the country for decades. The country experienced widespread fuel shortages. A presidential decree in December 2025 ended national fuel subsidies, causing much higher gasoline prices. President Rodrigo Paz was elected in October 2025 after campaigning for economic reform. The 2026 Iran war also contributed to pressure on the country's economy.

Since taking office, Paz has distanced himself from many of his voters. He formed his cabinet primarily with conservative business leaders, leaving Indigenous operatives and the labour and agrarian sectors without representation. Many voters felt betrayed and neglected by Paz after voting for him in the 2025 election.

Before its 13 May repeal after backlash from the Indigenous peoples and rural organizations, Law 1720, which had been put into effect on 10 April, allowed titled small agricultural property to be voluntarily converted into medium property upon written request and a sworn declaration. This made the land eligible to be used as collateral for bank loans. Critics argued that the law was a potential threat to farmers, as Law 1720 also stripped land of its immunity from seizure and commodification.

== Timeline ==
=== May ===
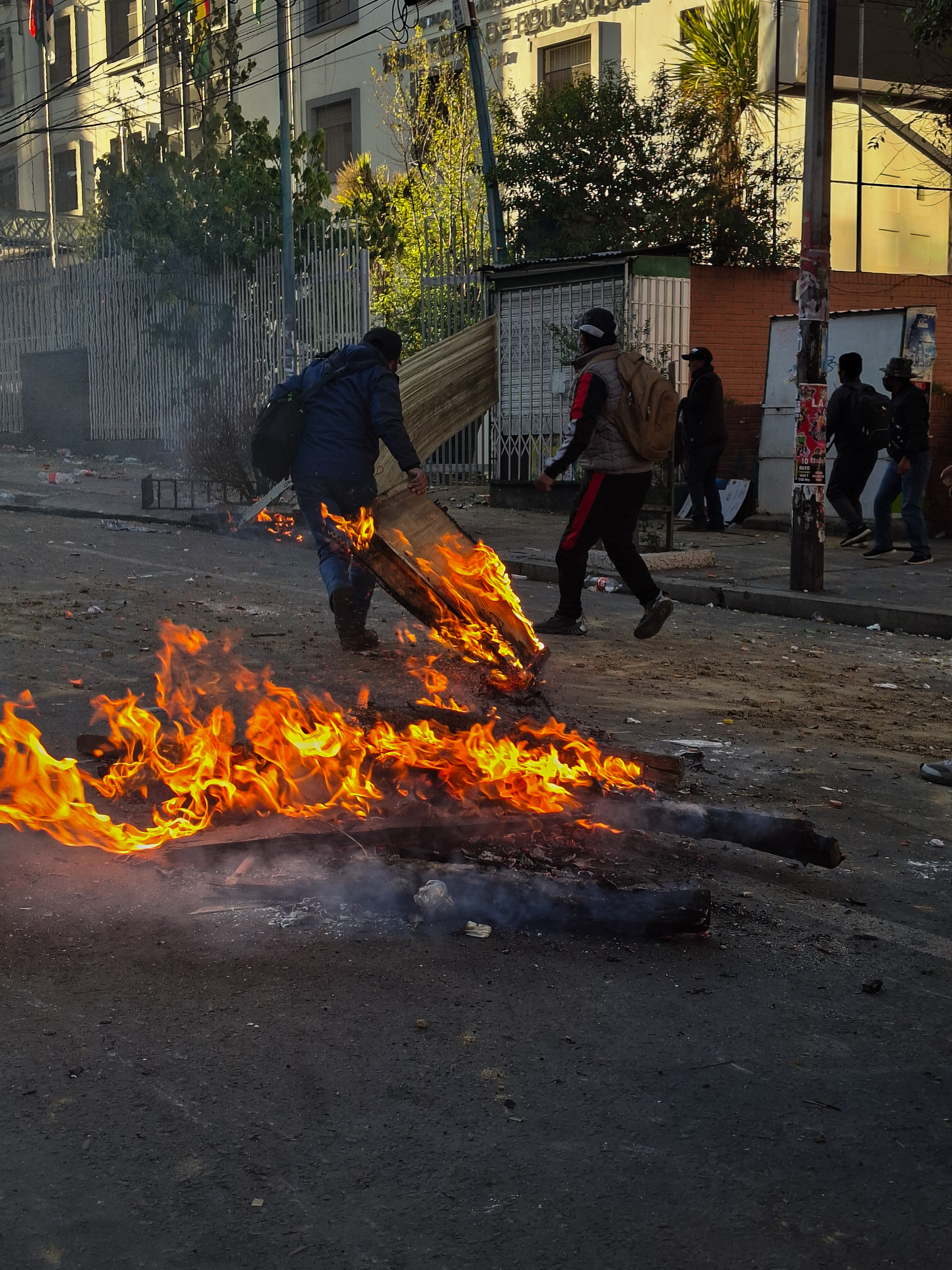
Protesters setting a fire on a road in La Paz, 14 May.

Protests occurred sporadically since January before flaring up at the beginning of May. Initially triggered by farmers protesting against a law allowing land mortgage, the unrest began with roadblocks and marches across the country. The first blockade in La Paz occurred on 1 May, with a general strike being called the same day. 67 highways were blockaded around Bolivia leading to restricted domestic trade starting around 6 May. Around 12 May, the protests escalated as thousands of workers marched in the capital, La Paz. The farmers were joined by miners, who protested for labour reform and fuel, as well as teachers and Indigenous Bolivians. Even though Paz annulled Law 1720 on 13 May, the protests continued to spread. In early May, Labour Minister Edgar Morales resigned.

Early on 14 May, a small delegation of 20 miners from the Bolivian Workers' Center (Spanish: Central Obrera Boliviana; COB) went to the presidential palace to talk with Paz, to no avail. Later that day, miners detonated small sticks of dynamite as some protesters attempted to forcibly enter the presidential palace. According to Anadolu Ajansi, some protesters reportedly threw Molotov cocktails at security officers during the confrontation. Police used tear gas to combat the protesters and blocked roads around the presidential palace. Later in the day on 15 May, the focus of the protests turned to demanding Paz's resignation. The protestors utilised the strategy of road blocks against the state, which deployed over 3,500 security personnel to dismantle them. As a result, over 5,000 trucks were left stranded on highways, reportedly causing over US$50,000,000 in losses per day. Some schools and public transportation lines were closed due to the unrest.

The Bolivian Workers' Central, of which many of the miners are members, declared that larger protests would continue if their demands to the government were not met. The COB has demanded wage increases, and peasant unions and transport workers demanded increased access to high quality gasoline instead of the "junk gasoline" that the government had imported to save money and caused damage to their cars. The miners are negotiating separately for access to additional mining areas. Public schoolteachers are also holding separate talks for increased wages.

Former president Evo Morales led a 190-kilometre (120 mi) march into La Paz on 19 May, escalating pressure on the capital. In response to the protests, on 20 May Paz announced a cabinet reshuffle, which was completed by 25 May. On 23 May, police forces and the military were dispatched to create humanitarian corridors for convoys to enter the city. These convoys were attacked by protesters and had stones and dynamite thrown at them. While he was overseeing an attempt to clear blockades in Copata, Public Works Minister Mauricio Zamora was ambushed by protesters and forced to flee. He was located and rescued later that day. By 24 May, the blockades had spread to the nearby city of El Alto. On 25 May, Rodrigo Paz left La Paz and fled to Bolivia's constitutional capital, Sucre. Later that day, Paz said that he would cut his salary and those of his cabinet ministers in half as a show of goodwill and commitment to the country.

On 26 May, protesters surrounded the presidential palace and called for Paz to resign. Police fired tear gas at protesters while the protesters lit explosives. Because of the blockades, many stores and gas stations were closed. According to Al Jazeera, the protests had no intention of stopping. Subsidised chicken was airlifted into La Paz to circumvent the blockades on 27 May, but most commodities were still prevented from entering the capital. Counter-protests also occurred, led mainly by shopowners who were unable to stock their stores.

Beginning on 26 May, the Bolivian government began to take a harsher tone against the protests. Late that day, Congress passed a law allowing Paz to use the Bolivian Army against civil unrest. Paz was also pressured to declare a state of emergency to allow him to use extra powers to quell the protests. However, Paz described this as "an option of last resort". Paz signed the law into effect on 27 May. He said in a speech that day the "time is running out" for the protesters and threatened to escalate the use of force.

President Paz convened an emergency cabinet meeting with several of his ministers to discuss the protesters' demands. Economy Minister José Gabriel Espinoza said that the government was "open to dialogue" with the protesters. By this point, the cities of La Paz and El Alto had become almost completely isolated from the rest of the country by blockades. Presidential spokesperson José Luis Gálvez suggested that Evo Morales, who led Bolivia from 2006 to 2019, was spearheading the protests. On 25 May, Morales called for early elections within the next 90 days.

On 20 May 2026, the Bolivian government announced that it had expelled the Colombian ambassador, Elizabeth García, after Colombian president Gustavo Petro expressed his support for the protesters. President Paz had earlier called Petro's remarks "reproachable".

=== June ===
On 2 June, the FEJUVE, a council consisting of local residents' boards in El Alto declared a state of emergency in the city and called for Paz to resign and for those arrested during the protests to be released. The city's mayor, Eliser Roca, said that the city was losing roughly US$6.5 million per day since being isolated. Later that day, a group of protesters occupied the Humberto Suárez oil fields near Santa Rosa del Sara, closing valves and lighting fires. The authorities attempted to negotiate the withdrawal of protesters from the oil wells, but were unsuccessful as the protesters vowed to remain until Paz resigned. On 3 June, police regained control of the facility and arrested eight people. During the operation, protesters used downed trees to block access roads leading to the oil field and threw rocks at police officers. Minister of Defence Marcelo Salinas and Minister of Education Beatriz Garcia de Achá resigned on 2 June.

Protest being held in front of the Ministry of Education, May 14

A meeting was convened on 3 June in the Plurinational Legislative Assembly, Bolivia's legislature, to discuss the terms of the protesters. Initially, the meeting had been expected to consist of the leaders of political factions in the legislature, the presidents of each chamber, vice president Edmand Lara, and minister of the presidency José Luis Lupo. However, President Paz show up to the meeting unannounced. During the meeting, Lupo announced the 80 agreements had been signed between the government and various activist groups. The next day, Lupo met with the Constitutional Commission to discuss establishing talks between the government and protesters. The blockades sparked many comments that were racist toward Indigenous people from white and affluent populations. On 3 June, Paz named Ernesto Justiniano as the new defence minister, who named his first priority as resolving the unrest.

On 5 June, soldiers and police successfully cleared a key road leading from La Paz west towards rural communities which had been blocked with debris by protesters.On the morning of 6 June, a joint police and military operation attempted to clear a series of roadblocks on Route 9 between the cities of Santa Cruz de la Sierra and Trinidad. The operation began at 04:00 and lasted for four hours, with 900 police officers and 100 soldiers participating. During the operation, a firefight broke out between the authorities and the protesters in which at least 6 officers and 14 protesters were injured, including 4 by gunfire. After around four hours of fighting, the police withdrew and protesters retook their positions along the road.

After weeks of pressure, on 7 June the Chamber of Deputies passed a law allowing the use of members of the military against protesters. Previously, soldiers assisting in clearing blockades were considered to be in support roles with riot police. The bill also included a measure that would make soldiers' actions presumed legal until proven otherwise. Paz signed the bill into force the next day. Despite the law being passed, Paz still did not declare a state of emergency. The Associated Press (AP) noted that this may be due to the fact that previous governments have been ousted after violently cracking down on protests. On 8 June, he called the protest leaders "narco-terrorists" and warned of a harsher crackdown.

Following a speech by Paz on 8 June after signing the decree allowing the military to assist police enforcement, protesters in El Alto stormed a public transport union's office. 28 people were arrested in the subsequent operation. In the country's fourth-most populous city of Cochabamba, protesting farmers attempted to cut off the Khora bridge that was along the major route connecting the city with western Bolivia. Protesters threw sticks of dynamite at police, who used tear gas to force the farmers back, making 23 arrests.

On 12 June, residents of El Alto who were protesting attacked a police convoy passing through the outskirts of the city. As the convoy attempted to cross a canal, it was ambushed by rioters and set on fire. The police officers were made to take their clothes off and throw them into the fire. Police efforts to clear blockades also escalated that week. By 13 June, the Bolivian Highway Administration (Spanish: Administradora Boliviana de Carreteras) reported that 77 blockades remained. Most of these blockades were concentrated in the departments of Cochabamba and La Paz, with 28 and 20 respectively. Bolivia's tourism industry was greatly impacted by the protests; 90% of hotel bookings were cancelled during the protests and the industry reported losses of over US$200 million since the start of the unrest. The total consequences were not all immediate, as industry leaders said that the protests were deteriorating Bolivia's international image and could take months to recover.

The Federación Túpac Katari social organisation met in Pucarani on 12 June. In this meeting, it was decided to continue with the unrest and blockades. An emergency national meeting was called by the Bolivian Worker's Center for the evening of 13 May at their headquarters in Prado, La Paz. The meeting's stated aims were to assess the current situation and clarify their position regarding negotiations with the government. The Workers' Center also said in a statement that protesters must allow ambulances and other medical workers to pass through the blockades. By 15 June, the economic impact of the blockades had reached USD$2.76 billion, impacting 5.5% of Bolivia's GDP.

An "Anti-Blockade Bill" (Spanish: Proyecto de Ley Antibloqueos) was introduced in the assembly of Chuquisaca Department on 16 June, seeking to combat the pressure made on the area by the blockades. The bill would give fines to those who participate in blockades in the department, to be enforced by a new Departmental Registry of Losses (Spanish: Registro Departamental de Pérdidas). This bill was inspired by a similar law in Beni Department, which aimed to reduce blockades in the department. Five people were subsequently arrested under the law in Beni. Also on 16 June, the Bolivian Worker's Center announced that they were open to direct talks with the government, which they had so far refused.

On 17 June, a group of protesters looted and burned the office of the Sub-Mayor of El Alto. The sub-mayor had been accused of betrayal after meeting with President Paz. The looting caused large material damage to the office, destroying large amounts of documents critical to running the municipal government. In response to the looting, the mayor announced that legal action would be taken against the looters. Also on 17 June, the Bolivian Worker's Center said that it would increase the number of blockades in the El Alto area, giving Paz a 48 hour deadline to resign. In addition, some protesters called for the COB to lead a hunger strike in addition to the ongoing protests.

In Cochabamba, dairy farmers whose economic prospects had been hurt by the blockades led counter-protests at Jorge Wilstermann International Airport calling for the blockades to be lifted. They complained that their industry was being "suffocated" and that the stifling of movement throughout the country was causing damage to their businesses. The farmers called on the government to reopen the roads immediately, warning that the economic impact of the protests was affecting the entire nation. Bolivian Economic Minister José Gabriel Espinoza warned that the protests and blockades had left a state of "war-like devastation" in affected cities and that the hardest-hit regions had had their economies "destroyed". He also predicted that the protests will lead to negative growth for the entire country in 2026.

Constitutional courts in La Paz and Oruro gave rulings on 17 June that the blockades were illegal. The rulings sought to protect the flow of goods and traffic and establish humanitarian routes for aid to reach the isolated cities. The president of the Plurinational Constitutional Court, Paola Verónica Prudencio, warned protesters that the blockading roads was a criminal offence and would result in arrest and prosecution. The rulings mandated that the COB and other mobilised groups guarantee humanitarian corridors for the safe passage of aid. By 17 June, 49 blockades still remained in five of Bolivia's nine departments.

Photograph of authorities in La Paz, May 2026

On 19 June, President Paz announced that he had signed a deal with the Bolivian Worker's Center, one of the largest organisations leading the protests. COB leader Mario Argollo said of the deal that "we must begin to iron out our differences" but that workers would have to participate in decision-making. Despite the deal with the COB, no other organisations had signed on. Many protesters are members of indigenous groups or Morales supporters, making progress difficult. Primarily in the Cochabamba area, most roadblocks are guarded by members supporting Morales. In the mountainous regions, the indigenous group Túpac Katari also holds much influence. Other than the COB, all protest groups have refused to negotiate with Paz's government. According to analysts, the COB had been by then "delegitimised", both because of its deal with the government without having achieved its objectives and for failing to reach its goals despite causing great pain to the country.

On 20 June, the 50th day of protests, Paz officially declared a state of emergency. He had so far refused to do so despite pressure from some of his allies in government and local organisations. In his speech announcing the state of emergency, Paz said that the protests had escalated from only a social movement to also trying to destabilise democracy in Bolivia. He also told the Bolivian people that the measure would protect citizens and commerce. In the decree, Paz prohibited roadblocks and ordered the military to assist police with clearing roads and "restoring order". The state of emergency lasts for 90 days, but can be ended earlier. Meanwhile, some opposition figures and analysts warned that the measure would only escalate the situation. In the early morning of 21 June, the bill was endorsed by the Congress.

Shortly after Paz's announcement, at least 200 heavily armed police officers were seen around a headquarters in El Alto. Later in the morning of 20 June, a large police convoy drove in the direction of a frequently-blockaded major highway near the city. Other operations to clear roadblocks also took place throughout the day. A major operation also cleared the La Paz–Oruro highway a few hours later, allowing traffic to gradually resume. On 21 June, Evo Morales ordered the lifting of blockades in the Cochabamba area, the only region still with major blockades. By 23 June, the Bolivian Highway Administration announced that all blockades had been cleared and that only four roads were still closed for protest-related causes. These roads, located between Cochabamba and Oruro had only residual debris left by protesters that had not yet been cleared.

== Aftermath ==
On 26 June, a citizens' committee in Santa Cruz de la Sierra, one of the cities heavily impacted by the blockades, announced that they pursue criminal charges against protesters involved in blockading the city. The organisation claimed that the blockades had incurred losses of 3 billion US dollars and affected over 150,000 jobs in the city. The committee's president said that the recovery would "cost us dearly" and that "someone has to pay the bill". In the department of Cochabamba, government prosecutors said that they would wait for official police reports before initiating legal action. On 9 July, the Bolivian public prosecutor said that there were 148 open criminal cases against people involved in the blockades, with the vast majority (114) being in the department of La Paz. On 27 June, Minister of Government Marco Antonio Oviedo said that authorities had established a connection between the leaders of the blockades in San Julián and Cuatro Cañadas and an earlier land-grabbing case in Santa Cruz. Oviedo said that police and military reports had established the connection, and that investigations would be conducted by the Bolivian executive. The Santa Cruz Departmental Prosecutor's Office issued an arrest warrant for Evo Morales on 29 July, saying that he had instigated the blockades.

Even though the blockades and major protests had ended, the state of emergency was kept in place. Under the order, the Bolivian military patrols cities across the country. On 27 June, the General Command of the Bolivian Army (Spanish: Comando General del Ejército de Bolivia) said that the patrols were being carried out "within the framework of the political constitution" and "in strict respect for fundamental rights" of the people. The same day, Defence Minister Ernesto Justiniano said that there had been no roadblocks for five days and that the military was increasing its presence around airports, highways, and other strategic locations.

One of the leaders of the FEJUVE residents' organisation in El Alto, Alberto Quelali, was arrested on 26 June for his involvement in the protests. A member of the department assembly had filed a complaint against Quelali, leading to his arrest. Similar complaints have also been levied against other figures in the FEJUVE. A committee consisting of the Minister of Defence, Minister of Government, and local leaders from Santa Cruz agreed on 27 June to work to prevent immunity for the leaders of the blockades. In the meeting, they pledged to identify the instigators of the protests and to hold them responsible. Minister of Government Oviedo said that the Bolivian intelligence service was investigating the blockades. The government ombudsman's report on the blockades was delivered on 1 July to the Chamber of Deputies. During the report, the ombudsman was questioned by legislators on his handling of the conflict.

On 2 July, the governor of Santa Cruz Department, JP Velasco, said that "all those who have harmed La Paz must answer to justice". In addition, the Public Prosecutor of La Paz accepted criminal complaints against Evo Morales, labour leader Mario Argollo, and the leader of Túpac Katari Vincente Salazar for instigating the blockades. On 3 July, Morales rejected the charges against him, saying that they were politically motivated and that he had not been involved in organising protests. Salazar was arrested a few days later, with the public prosecutor saying on 9 July that they had "sufficient evidence that he was promoting the blockades". As of 17 July, he was held in the Chonchocoro prison in pre-trial detention. In response, Túpac Katari published a statement calling on members to protest Salazar's arrest and declaring a state of emergency within the organisation. As of 9 July, neither Morales or Argollo had been arrested. On 15 July, the Bolivian government held a meeting with the leadership of Túpac Katari, after which the government said that "rapprochement" had been achieved with the group. However, Túpac Katari warned that they would resume protests and blockades if the government proceeded with an anti-blockade law.

On 2 July, the United Trade Union Confederation of Peasant Workers of Bolivia (Spanish: Confederación Sindical Única de Trabajadores Campesinos de Bolivia) expelled three local leaders for supporting the blockades and refusing to recognise the group's executive secretary. One of the leaders, Severo Marca, was prosecuted and referred to the group's Ethics Commission. Another expelled leader, Alejandro Ticona, was accused of making public statements on behalf of the group without the approval of the national leadership. On 7 July, the Confederation of Bolivian Driver's Unions (Spanish: Confederación Sindical de Choferes de Bolivia) gave President Paz a 48-hour ultimatum for a meeting with drivers. A leader in the bloc demanded that Paz "tell the truth" and that the government was not "fulfilling its obligations", saying "we will not tolerate this anymore". In response, the Bolivian public works minister said that the shortages were a result of "mafias" taking subsidised fuel. Fuel lines at gas stations also remained long into July, with severe residual shortages lasting despite the end of the blockades themselves. On 21 July, Paz also blamed the structure of the state petrol company and the National Hydrocarbons Agency, saying that they were "an endemic problem".

Following the protests, the Bolivian government planned to introduce a new electricity law aiming to privatise the energy sector and increase competition. The plan was in opposition to the wishes of the protesters, who were concerned about the privatisation of services in Bolivia and the influence of foreign companies. Similarly, Paz also announced that he was pushing for reform in the mining industry, seeking to attract higher levels of foreign investment. He also said that he planned to implement laws to help return to a state of normalcy and return trade to pre-blockade levels. Speaking at the anniversary of the 1809 revolution, Paz promised investment of over Bs. 1 billion into roads and Bs. 17 billion into highways over the next 4 years.

In a major shift in economic policy, Paz announced on 26 June that the Bolivian boliviano would no longer be pegged to the US dollar. The currency had been pegged closely to the dollar for 15 years. The change was officially implemented on 29 June, giving the boliviano a floating exchange rate. The decision was put in place in response to a widening gap between the official exchange rate and illegitimate rates that were far higher. After the change, the exchange rate dropped from Bs. 9.73 to $1 to Bs. 10.75 to $1, where it had stabilised by 17 July. This was the first time ever that the boliviano had exceeded Bs. 10 to the dollar. However, on 22 July it exceeded Bs. 11 to the dollar, putting pressure on importers to Bolivia, who by then had begun to feel the cost of the new exchange rate. In addition, the Paz government requested a US$3.3 billion loan from the International Monetary Fund, aiming to strengthen the state's monetary liquidity. Negotiations for the loan were expected to begin on 15 July. On that day, the Bolivian government announced that negotiations were progressing smoothly and that the IMF deal would be completed soon. On 29 July, the IMF announced that it would give the Bolivian government $1.9 billion over the course of 3 years as well as allowing at least $5 billion to come from other multilateral organisations.

On 24 June, foreign minister Fernando Aramayo said that the blockades had caused the loss of approximately 250,000 jobs across the country, both directly and indirectly. At a press conference on 29 June, the public works minister Mauricio Zamora said that the damage from the blockades had exceeded Bs. 100 million to road infrastructure. On 7 July, the figure was revised upwards to Bs. 150 billion, with damage being noted in 37 sectors of the Fundamental Road Network. In addition, the lack of income from tolls was estimated to have cost the government about Bs. 50 million. The same day, finance minister José Gabriel Espinoza said that the total economic losses from the protests was over Bs. 14 billion. The La Paz Departmental Chamber of Industries (Spanish: Cámara Departamental de Industrias de La Paz), or Cadinpaz, said on 14 July that during the protests 70% of businesses in La Paz were severely affected by the protests, according to their survey. In addition, 90% of companies experienced a drop in business of over 25%, with 65% saying that they were still worse off than before the blockades. According to Cadinpaz, almost half of companies made layoffs during the crisis, and only 15% have enough liquidity to operate normally. By late July, the Bolivian economy was still in a poor state, showing few signs of financial upturn despite the state of emergency and recovery plans from the government.

Dumpster on the road during protests in front of the Ministry of Education, May 2026

Meat prices across the country also increased sharply throughout the protests. Although most chicken is produced in the east of Bolivia, much passes through El Alto for export or is consumed in the capital region. At the height of the blockades, the price of a chicken, a kilogram of pork, or a kilogram of beef reached Bs. 120. As of 28 May, over 100,000 chickens had died throughout the country due to a lack of food that that had been cut off by the blockades. After the end of the protests and the introduction of a floating exchange rate, meat prices stayed elevated. On 15 July, Bolivian poultry farmers demanded a meeting with Paz to discuss price shocks and the impact of the economic changes on the poultry industry. The price of imported consumer goods was also affected by the exchange rate changes.

To implement the terms of the agreement reached between the government and the COB on 19 June to end the blockades, four committees were formed on 19 July. The committees plan to review the terms of the deal and find solutions to fulfill the measures laid out in the agreement. The four groups are composed of government representatives from related ministries as well as leaders from the COB.

=== Casualties ===
As of 9 July, at least 24 people were killed and, as of 20 June, at least 37 injured due to the protests. At least fourteen died after supplies failed to reach hospitals blockaded by protesters, and at least one person was killed in clashes with police. The remaining deaths were being investigated. At least four police officers were shot in clashes with protesters, and 25 police officers were injured in total. As of 2 July, at least 583 people were arrested in connection with the protests.

== International reactions ==
The American government spoke in defence of Paz's government, saying it "supported Paz's efforts to restore order for the peace, security and stability of the Bolivian people". U.S. Deputy Secretary of State Christopher Landau also expressed solidarity with president Paz during a phone call, calling the protests a "coup" and saying that he was "concerned" about the situation in Bolivia. The U.S. Embassy in La Paz closed on 27 and 28 May due to the unrest. On 5 June, according to Fox News, 13 members of the Shield of the Americas multinational bloc condemned the protests and blockades, calling them an attempt to "overthrow" the Paz government. U.S. president Donald Trump said that the unrest amounted to a coup and that the protests were being funded by "narco-terrorists". U.S. Secretary of Defense Pete Hegseth also referred to the protests as attempting to "overthrow" the Bolivian government.

Argentine president Javier Milei expressed support for President Paz. Argentina subsequently sent two Lockheed C-130 Hercules aircraft carrying humanitarian aid to reinforce the support for the Paz government. In response, President Paz thanked Milei, while Evo Morales denounced Argentina's actions, saying that the planes were used to transport military personnel between cities inside Bolivia, adding that Milei had provided the Bolivian government with military equipment to use against protesters.

Other expressions of support for Paz came from Chilean president José Antonio Kast, Costa Rican president Laura Fernández Delgado, Honduran president Nasry Asfura, Panamanian president José Raúl Mulino, and the governments of Ecuador, Paraguay, and Peru. Bolivian Foreign Minister Fernando Aramayo thanked the governments of Argentina, Chile, and Ecuador for providing humanitarian aid to Bolivia and its security forces, rejecting media statements about military support from these countries.

On 25 May, the Brazilian Ministry of Foreign Affairs issued a warning advising its citizens against travel to the provinces of La Paz, Oruro and Potosí due to the road blockades. On 29 May, Brazil donated 16 tons of rice and 5 tons of powdered whole milk to Bolivia, delivering the humanitarian aid to La Paz via a KC-390 cargo airplane. The aid was sent after a telephone call between Brazilian president Lula da Silva and Paz.

== See also ==
- 2026 in Bolivia
- List of protests in the 21st century

=== Protests in Bolivia ===
- 2024 Bolivian protests
- 2021 Bolivian doctors' strike
- 2020 Bolivian protests
- 2019 Bolivian protests
