= 2019 Bolivian protests =

Protests against electoral fraud allegations in the 2019 Bolivian elections

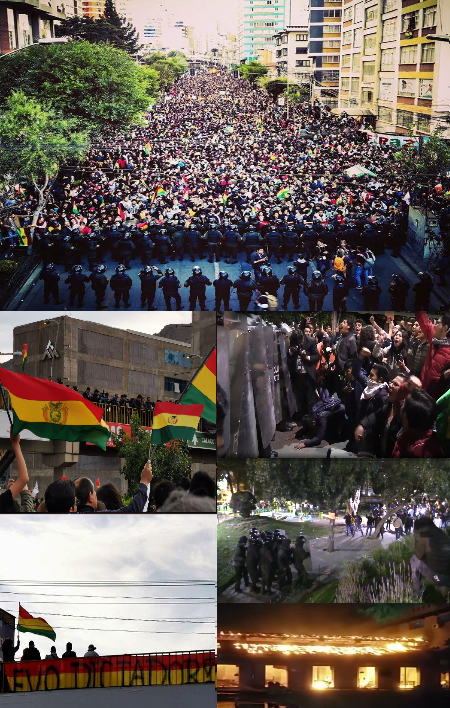
- Date: Before Morales resignation 21 October – 10 November 2019; After Morales resignation 11–21 November 2019
- Location: Bolivia
- Caused by: Before Morales resignation: Alleged election fraud in the 2019 Bolivian general election; After Morales resignation: Opposition to acting president Jeanine Áñez and support for Morales and Movement for Socialism
- Methods: Protests, rioting, civil resistance, unrest, and strike actions
- Result: Evo Morales and Álvaro García Linera resigns as President and Vice President of Bolivia; Resignations of the president of the Chamber of Deputies, Víctor Borda, and the president of Chamber of Senators, Adriana Salvatierra; Áñez becomes acting president; new elections held in October 2020; Luis Arce and the MAS-IPSP win 2020 elections; Áñez placed under arrest on 13 March 2021

Parties
(Bolivia) Opposition; Pro-Santa Cruz Civic Committee; Santa Cruz Youth Union; Potosí Civic Committee; La Paz Civic Committee; Student protesters; Political parties; Civic Community; Christian Democratic Party; Revolutionary Nationalist Movement; Bolivian National Police defectors; Armed Forces of Bolivia defectors; Anti-MAS groups; 21F platforms; Bolivian Workers' Center (faction)	Government of Bolivia; Armed Forces of Bolivia; Bolivian Army; Bolivian National Police; Movement for Socialism; Plurinational Electoral Organ; Pro-Morales groups; Pro-MAS protesters; Bolivian Workers' Center; Red Ponchos; FEJUVE; Pact of Unity; Unified Trade Union Sub Federation of Peasant Workers of Ancoraimes – Tupak Katari; CSUTCB; Bartolina Sisa Confederation; Unified Syndical Confederation of Rural Workers of Bolivia; National Council of Ayllus and Markas of Qullasuyu

Lead figures
(Bolivia) Carlos Mesa (Bolivia) Luis Fernando Camacho (Bolivia) Marco Pumari (Bolivia) Oscar Ortiz (Bolivia) Jorge Quiroga (Bolivia) Chi Hyun Chung (Bolivia) Rafael Quispe	Evo Morales (Bolivia) Álvaro García Linera (Bolivia) Diego Pary Rodríguez (Bolivia) Carlos Romero Bonifaz (Bolivia) Víctor Borda (Bolivia) Adriana Salvatierra (Bolivia) Héctor Arce (Bolivia) Leonardo Loza (Bolivia) Andrónico Rodríguez

Casualties
- Deaths: 33 (as of 27 November 2019)
- Injuries: 804 (as of 27 November 2019)
- Arrested: 1511 (as of 27 November 2019)

The 2019 Bolivian protests, also known as the Pitita Revolution (Spanish: la Revolución de las Pititas), were protests and marches from 21 October 2019 until late November of that year in Bolivia, in response to claims of electoral fraud in the 2019 general election of 20 October. After 11 November 2019, there were protests by supporters of the outgoing government in response to Jeanine Áñez becoming the acting president of Bolivia. The claims of fraud were made after the suspension of the preliminary vote count, in which incumbent Evo Morales was not leading by a large enough margin (10%) to avoid a runoff, and the subsequent publication of the official count, in which Morales won by just over 10%. Some international observers expressed concern over the integrity of the elections.

While the majority of the demonstrations were peaceful, there were also numerous acts of violence. Initial violence allegedly targeted opposition protesters. Pro-MAS supporters were bused into opposition areas, given weapons, and were told to clear blockades, resulting in death and injury of opposition protesters. In the later weeks of the protests, senior members of the Movement for Socialism (MAS) and their families were victims of attacks, including vandalism and arson of their houses.

Morales denied the allegations and invited international observers to audit the electoral processes, promising to hold a runoff if any fraud was found, although initially refusing to be bound by the results of an audit. Opposition leaders rejected the OAS audit, saying they hadn't been party to the agreement. Subsequently, an audit team from the Organization of American States (OAS), with access provided by Bolivian authorities, worked to verify the integrity and reliability of the results. Their preliminary report, released on 10 November 2019 questioned the integrity of the election results and recommended another "electoral process".

Following the release of the OAS initial report, Morales announced the government would hold another full election (rather than a runoff). However, later that day, the influential National Union of Workers requested Morales' resignation, followed 5 hours later by the commanders of the Armed Forces who suggested Morales resign during a live televised press conference, and almost immediately after, the national Police Commander also requested his resignation. Morales, together with his Vice President Álvaro García Linera, resigned the same day, on live television; both also delivered written resignations. In Morales' case, he would later describe in his memoirs Volveremos y seremos millones (We'll come back and we'll be millions) that he took the decision to resign the night before the requests. Following his resignation and the resignations of the next two politicians in the line of succession, Jeanine Áñez, second vice-president of the Senate, was next in line for the presidency. On 12 November 2019, she formed an interim government.

Protests continued until the end of November, primarily by those who sought Morales' return. Under direction from Morales and his allies, and at times under coercion, protesters created blockades on inter-departmental highways, resulting in shortages of food and fuel. The UN High Commissioner for Human Rights expressed concerns over massacres by the new government in response to armed protests at Senkata and Sacaba. By 25 November 2019, the interim government had made agreements with most protest leaders to end blockades, and began to withdraw troops and to release arrested protesters.

== Background ==
=== Term limits ===
A 2016 constitutional referendum rejected a constitutional amendment that would have allowed Morales to run for re-election.

Article 168 of the 2009 constitution allowed the president and vice-president to be re-elected only once, limiting the number of terms to two. The governing party, the Movement for Socialism (MAS) sponsored an effort to amend this article. The referendum was authorized by a joint session of the Plurinational Legislative Assembly on 26 September 2015, by a vote of 112 to 41. Law 757, which convened the February referendum, passed by 113 votes to 43 and was promulgated on 5 November 2015.

The referendum marked the rise of anti-Morales sentiment in Bolivia. The vote was held on 21 February 2016 and the proposed amendment was rejected by 51.3% to 48.7%. A successful "yes" vote would have allowed President Evo Morales and Vice President Álvaro García Linera to run for another term in office in 2019. Morales had already been elected three times. The first time, in 2006, is not counted, as it was before the two-term limit was introduced by the 2009 constitution.

Despite the referendum result, the Plurinational Constitutional Tribunal overruled the constitution by deferring to Article 23 of the American Convention on Human Rights, which promotes the human right to participate in government. The court ruled a little over one year after the referendum in December 2017 that all public offices would have no term limits, thus allowing Morales to run for a fourth term.

The removal of term limits proved controversial among Bolivians, including Morales' supporters, with some losing trust in Morales for overturning a referendum. John Walsh, Andes Director of the Washington Office on Latin America, stated that "The court's decision, which was very much in favor of MAS, added to the tensions and distrust leading into this election" and that for Morales, it was "also just hard to be in power for that long and not lose popularity". Mark L. Schneider of the Center for Strategic and International Studies summarized that there was "no question that there was a successful impact on raising the standard of living of the poor" under Morales, but that "problems in Bolivia arose, unfortunately, from the same problems that you see in Nicaragua and Venezuela, in Honduras and elsewhere where individuals decide that it's more important to stay in power than to follow democratic norms and the rule of law".

=== 2019 general election ===
Heading into the elections, some voters distrusted Bolivia's voting system, suspecting fraud after Morales and his supporters disregarded the results of the 2016 referendum. Bolivia's Plurinational Electoral Body and the private company in charge of the preliminary vote count ad announced eleven days before the election, on 9 October, that only approximately 80% of the preliminary results would be released. On 20 October 2019, the first round of voting for all government positions was held. The Supreme Electoral Tribunal released two sets of counts shortly after the vote was closed. First was an exit poll that verified 95.6% of votes that showed incumbent President of Bolivia Evo Morales as having 9.33 percentage points over his main opposition and former president, Carlos Mesa. Leading by less than 10 percentage points indicates the vote must continue to a second run-off round. The complete count then appeared as provisional results on a website with routine live updates. At the point of 83.8% of votes in the complete count having been verified, the website showed Morales at 45.3% and Mesa at 38.2%; this also reflected a less than ten-point lead. However, no further updates to the preliminary results were made after 7:40 pm local time (UTC−4). The electoral authorities explained that updates to the preliminary count had been halted because the official results were beginning to be released; nevertheless, no official results were published overnight.

At 9:25 pm, as the vote counting was still underway, President Morales declared himself the winner of the elections, stating that while he would wait for final scrutiny of the results, the outstanding vote from rural areas would guarantee his victory; he did not mention the possibility of a runoff. Most of the remaining votes, from remote rural areas, were expected to go in Morales's favour, although the Organization of American States (OAS) recommended a runoff be held even if Morales's lead exceeded 10 points. Manuel González, head of the OAS election observation team in Bolivia, said that "In the case that [...] the margin of difference exceeds 10%, it is statistically reasonable to conclude that it will be by negligible margin" and that "given the context and the problematic issues in this electoral process the best option continues to be the convening of a second round." International observers expressed concern over the unexplained daylong gap in the reporting of results, which was followed by a surge in Morales votes when the count resumed. Félix Patzi, the presidential candidate for the Movimiento Tercer Sistema, alleged that following the unexplained 24-hour pause in the vote count on the day of the election, votes for his party had been changed to votes for the MAS.

On 21 October 2019, a press conference of the Plurinational Electoral Organ was held, which published data of the rapid count of the system of Transmisión de Resultados Electorales Preliminares (TREP, "Transmission of Preliminary Electoral Results"), published at 7:30 pm, almost a whole day after being initially suspended, stating that with 95.30 percent of the votes verified, Morales's MAS obtained 46.86% of the votes over the 36.72% of Mesa's Civic Community, surpassing the 10 percentage points needed to avoid a second run-off round and as such Morales would remain in power for a fourth term.

On 6 November, the Bolivian opposition published a 190-page-long report containing fraud accusations, including irregularities such as mistaken electoral acts additions, data wiping and electoral acts where the ruling party obtained more votes than registered voters, expecting to send it to international organizations such as the OAS and the United Nations.

== Timeline of events ==
=== October 21–24: aftermath of election ===
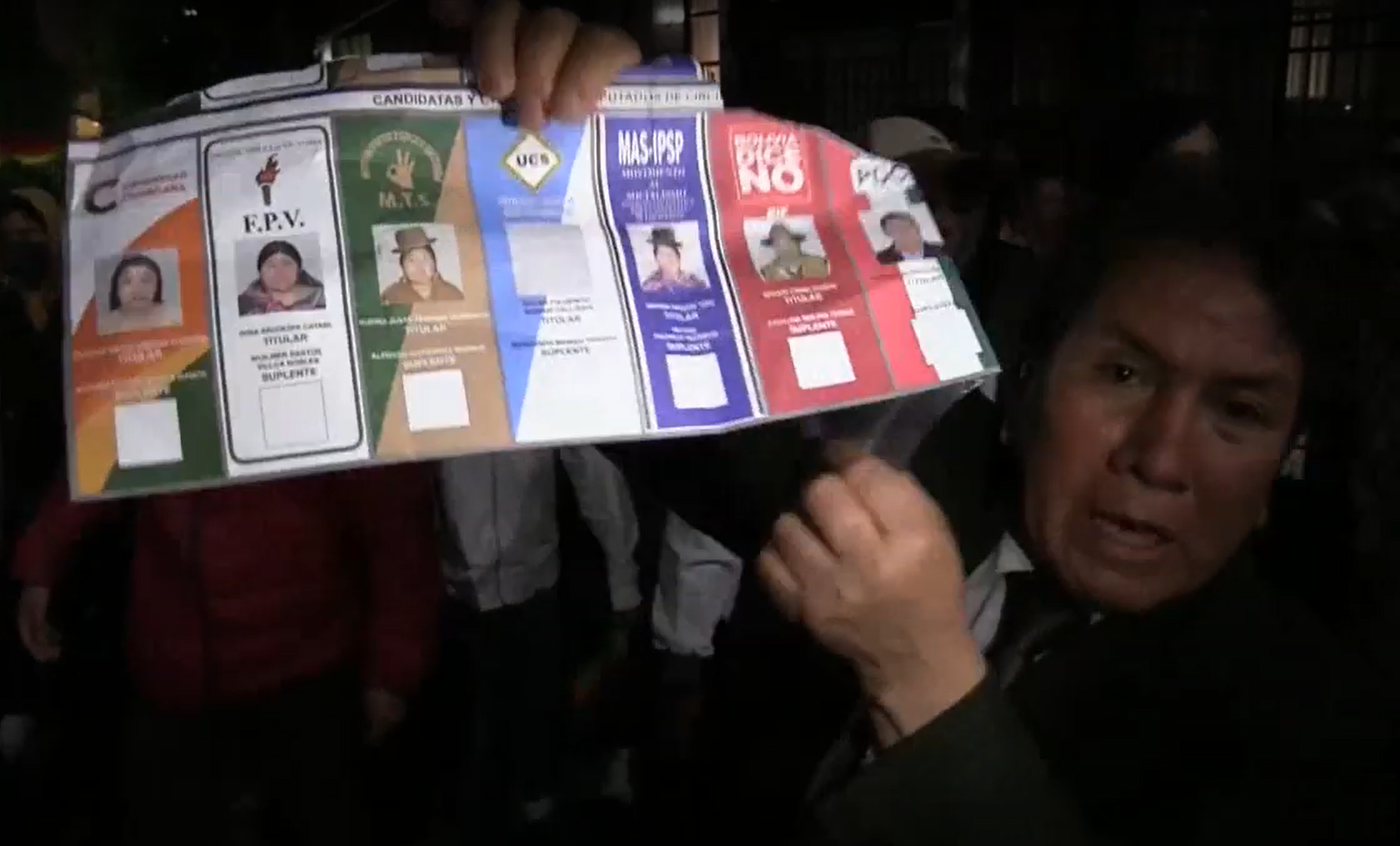
A man holds up what he describes as a fresh ballot sheet found in the streets of La Paz.

On the day following the election, protests erupted in cities across Bolivia, several of which became violent. In La Paz, a clash between opponents and supporters of Morales and police took place; opposition groups were attacked with tear gas by the police. In Riberalta, protesters toppled a statue of Hugo Chávez, an ally of Evo Morales, and left its head in front of the mayor's home. The mayor of Cobija, Luis Gatty Ribeiro, and the governor of Pando, Luis Adolfo Flores, were attacked by protesters, with Flores being hospitalized. In Oruro, a MAS tent and a Public Ministry vehicle were destroyed. The Ponchos Rojos, an indigenous organization and militia, announced that it would hold marches in support of Morales. It also warned it might resort to roadblocks in La Paz and would respond to attacks with chicotes (whips) and other weapons. In Sucre, a group of female police officers marched in the city's central square, calling for calm and demanding that the government refrain from police violence and respect the people's will.

In Sucre, Potosí and Tarija, several ballot boxes and election-related buildings were set on fire, including the campaign headquarters of MAS and the offices of an indigenous workers organization. In Potosí, the electoral court was set on fire, along with several hotels being used as vote counting centers. Four departmental electoral tribunals suspended their vote counts due to protests occurring outside. The Chuquisaca Departmental Electoral Court moved its vote count to the town of Zudañez after its facilities in Sucre were burned down. Likewise, the Electoral Tribunal of Potosí ended the recount in the municipality of Llallagua, without notifying the delegates of the opposition political parties. The counts show that in the municipalities of Zudañez and Llallagua the government party managed to obtain more than two thirds of the votes.

In La Paz and Potosí, boxes of electoral ballots were found in trash cans and in private homes, which further fueled the protests.

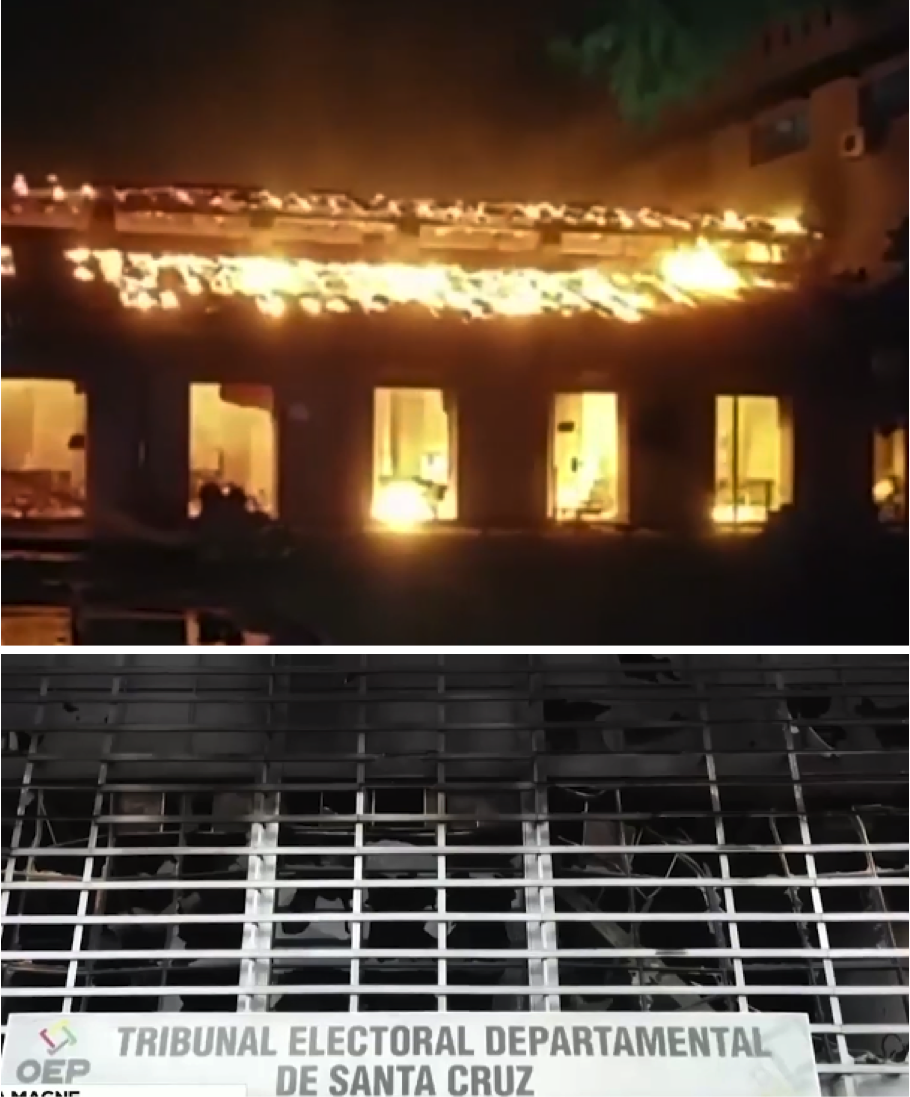
During and after images of a burning electoral council building

=== October 25–November 10: growing unrest ===
Protests, strikes and roadblocks continued over the next several weeks, sometimes turning violent. Police frequently dispersed demonstrations with tear gas. Luis Fernando Camacho, president of the Civic Committee in Santa Cruz, emerged as a leader of the protests in this time. Bolivians living abroad also organized demonstrations, demanding a second round between the leading candidates.

On October 25, the official results were announced, showing 47% for Morales, which would have enabled him to avoid a second round. The results sparked renewed protests. There were reports of people beginning to stockpile food. Over the next weeks, roadblocks were set up across the country by both supporters and opponents of Morales. In some cities the police was mobilized to prevent violence, although reports emerged of officers not protecting both sides. Opposition protesters in Oruro set fire to the homes of several MAS politicians, including the governors of Oruro and Chuquisaca, and Esther Morales, Evo Morales' sister. In the town of Vinto, opposition protesters set the town hall on fire and kidnapped the mayor, Patricia Arce. Protesters allegedly beat her, cut her hair, and forced her to walk barefoot 40 blocks where they then urinated and spit on her.

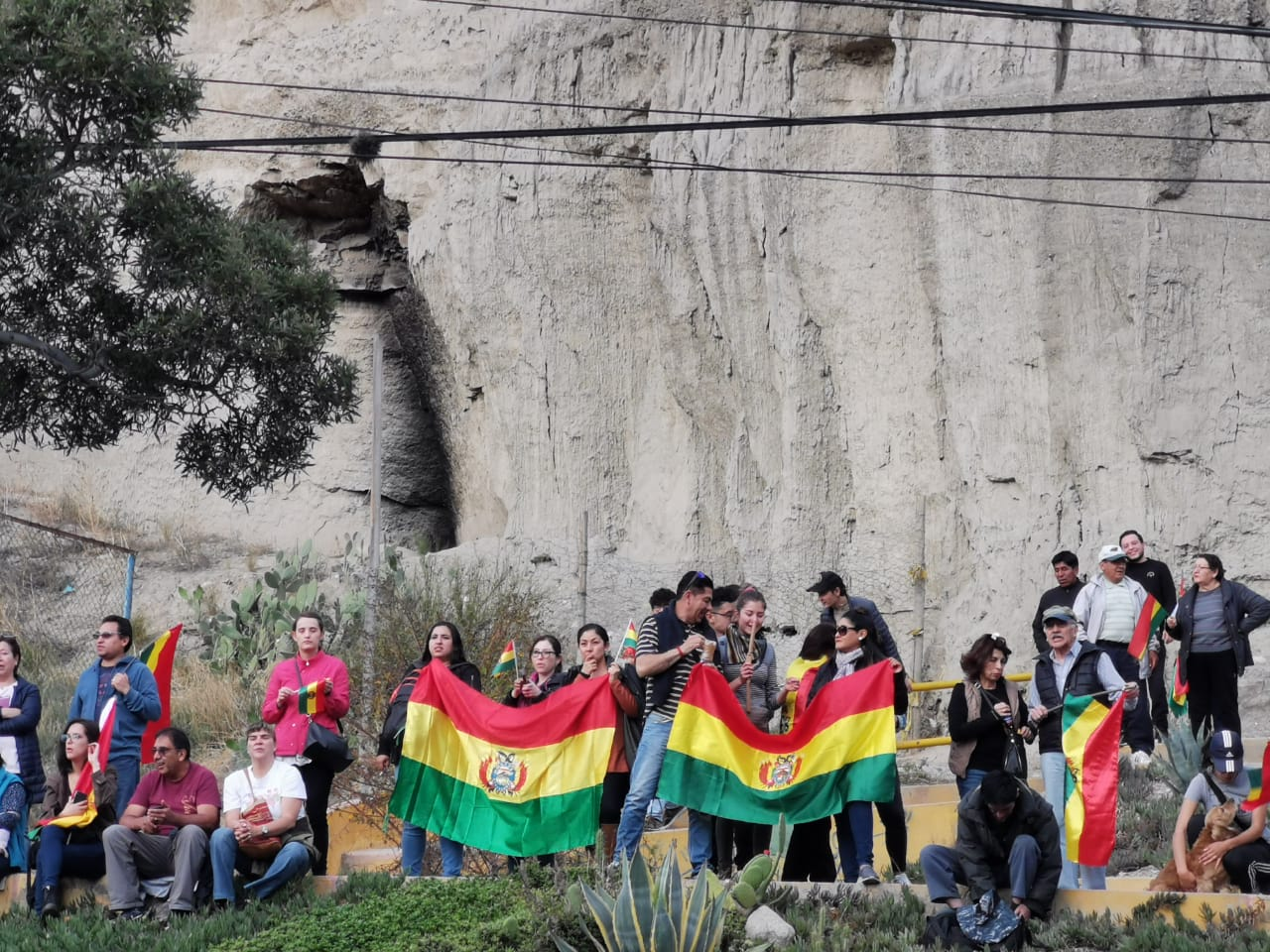
Demonstrators in La Paz on 29 October.

On October 31, the OAS began its audit of the election, with representatives from Spain, Paraguay and Mexico monitoring. On the same day, the government announced that at least two people had died in the protests since they began, both in the town of Montero. A further fatality occurred on November 7, when a student was killed during a confrontation between supporters and opponents of Morales.

By November 8, members of the police had joined the anti-Morales protests; in the evening, several could be seen protesting with flags on the roof of the Cochabamba police department, as well as in La Paz, Santa Cruz, and Sucre. On November 9, the Bolivian army announced that it would not suppress the protests. Evo Morales notes in his memoirs that he privately made the decision to resign that evening.

=== November 10: Morales resigns ===
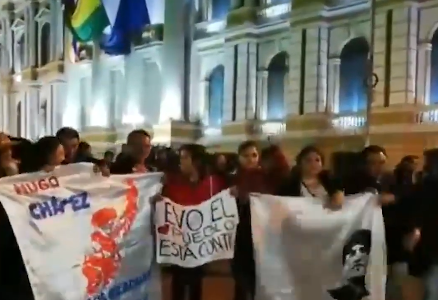
A pro-Morales counter-protest held before his resignation, featuring his likeness along that of Hugo Chávez

On 10 November the Organization of American States gave its audit of the election. The report alleged multiple irregularities, including "manipulations of the I.T. system [that] are of such magnitude that they should be investigated in depth." The organization recommended annulling the election and holding it again with new electoral authorities. The same day, the military asked Morales to resign and called on the Bolivian people to refrain from violence and disorder. Approximately an hour later, Morales announced his immediate resignation. He fled to Mexico the next day, which had offered him asylum.

The police withdrew from La Paz streets the next day, as crowds welcomed the transfer of power with fireworks. There were reports of looting and more politically motivated arson. At the same time, protests were held in support of Morales throughout Bolivia. El Alto was the site of a particularly large protest, in which multiple people were injured, with crowds chanting, "Now, civil war!" and waving the Wiphala indigenous flag. The acting president, Jeanine Áñez, called for the military to support the police. The head of Bolivia's military said that following reports police have been overtaxed by weeks of unrest, the armed forces would provide help in keeping order.

=== November 12: Áñez assumes presidency ===
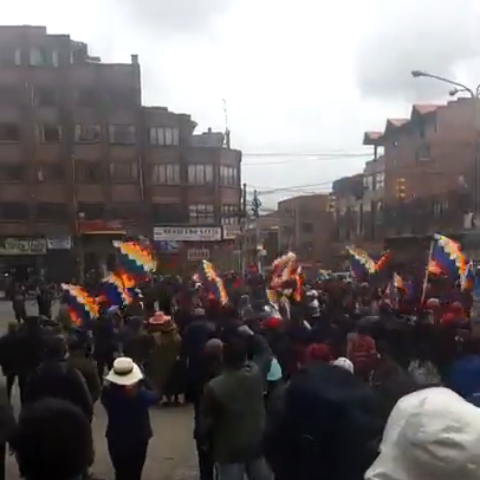
Pro-Morales counter-protestors wave the wiphala flag in El Alto following his departure

On November 12, citing article 169 of the Constitution of Bolivia, Jeanine Áñez declared herself President of the Senate, which made her the next in line for the office of the President of Bolivia. Parliament then voted to make her president. Although the vote did not have a quorum as it was boycotted by Morales' party, Movement for Socialism, it was later upheld by the Plurinational Constitutional Tribunal.

Protests intensified following Morales' departure, with pro-Morales protesters cutting off major Bolivian roads. In La Paz, tens of thousands of pro-Morales protesters clashed with police, military, and opposition forces as they attempted to make their way to the city's centre to protest Morales' removal. Another march of several thousand people was blocked from reaching the city's main square by military and security forces with tear gas and water cannons. In response, pro-Morales protesters blocked roads leading to the city's airport. Police, military and opposition forces set up roadblocks in anticipation of a renewed march on the city's centre. The wiphala, a flag representing the indigenous people of the Andes, became a symbol for Morales supporters. In some cases, the flag became a point of polarization; a video appeared online showing police officers cutting the flag out of their uniforms.

On November 13, Bolivian police used tear gas to break up a peaceful pro-Morales protest in La Paz. Following this, it blocked about a dozen pro-Morales senators from entering the legislature, upon which pro-Morales demonstrators responded with cries of "dictatorship" and by throwing stones at the policemen.

==== Sacaba massacre ====
In Sacaba, nine people were killed and over 100 injured during clashes between security forces and protesters. This resulted after police and armed forces attempted to prevent them from marching in either central Sacaba or the city of Cochabamba. Demonstrators set off sticks of dynamite, while the police and armed forces tried to disperse them with tear gas. This quickly escalated into violence. The total death toll since October 20 reached 23, as a demonstrator injured by gunfire died on June 11, 2020, after seven months with a bullet lodged in his head.

Áñez announced that the military would be exempt from criminal responsibility when acting in a "legitimate defense or state of necessity." The Inter-American Commission on Human Rights commission condemned the decree. Morales described the events as a massacre and the Áñez-led government as a "dictatorship". UN High Commissioner for Human Rights Michelle Bachelet called the events an "extremely dangerous development" and warned that widespread arrests and detentions were adding to the tensions, and that the crisis couldn't be solved through force and repression. A UN envoy met with Añez shortly thereafter to relay the organization's "concern". Arturo Murillo, a government minister, claimed that the army had not been ordered to fire and implied that the shots came from the side of the protesters. He also called for a transparent investigation by the attorney general's office.

In October 2023, the Attorney General sought criminal charges for eighteen former members of the government and military in part for their roles in the killings, including Áñez and Murillo.

==== 18 November ====
The interim interior minister Arturo Murillo threatened to arrest MAS legislators, who refuse to recognize Añez's legitimacy, for "subversion." He also cautioned journalists reporting on the protests to "not commit sedition." Murillo further threatened to unveil a list of MAS legislators which he deemed had been involved in alleged "sedition".

Thousands of Bolivian coca farmers came out in protest in favour of Morales and called for the resignation of Añez as Acting President. Bolivian police fired tear gas in the country's highlands to prevent the demonstrators from reaching the city of Cochabamba. Some of the protesters responded to the launching of tear gas by throwing stones at the police officers, which in turn responded by arresting at least ten demonstrators.

==== 19 November ====
Senate president and MAS leader Mónica Eva Copa instructed MAS legislators in the Plurinational Legislative Assembly to cancel a planned vote to reject Morales' resignation. She later announced that legislation would be introduced to annul the 20 October election and move towards new elections as soon as possible.

Eight people were killed in clashes outside the major Senkata gasoline plant that had been blockaded for days by Morales supporters as police and military attempted to escort a fuel convoy to relieve shortages in La Paz. Witnesses said that the men died when a military unit guarding the plant opened fire on the protesters that had surrounded it for over a week. Bolivia's new defense minister, Fernando López, told reporters that “not one bullet” had been fired by the military at Senkata, an account that was contradicted by dozen of witnesses who had gathered at the church that night.

==== 21 November ====
Dozens of thousands of pro-Morales protesters marched some 15 km from El Alto to downtown La Paz in response to the killings at Senkata. They brought with them the coffins of five of the eight victims of the tragedy. Protesters were dispersed with tear gas, which also hit many passersby. Police on motorcycles continued to fire tear gas at hiding or retreating protesters, pushing them further from the San Francisco Square. The Anez-led interim government blamed Morales and "radical groups" of allegedly supporting the violence.

==== 22 November ====
The interim government opened an investigation into Morales for "terrorism and sedition." Hours later, the vice-president of MAS-IPSP was arrested while travelling in a vehicle without licence plates carrying a number of computers and biometric equipment taken from the electoral commission offices.

== Responses ==
=== Reactions to fraud allegations ===
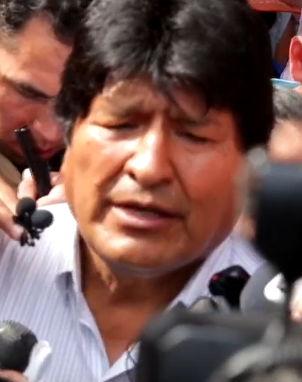
Morales on 23 October

The suspension of the vote count generated criticism in the opposition and the electoral observation mission of the Organization of American States (OAS). In a press conference, the head of the electoral observation mission of the OAS, former Costa Rican foreign minister Manuel González Sanz made a statement in which his team expressed concern about the drastic and unexplained changes published by the Supreme Electoral Tribunal that interpreted the victory of Evo Morales in the first round, saying "It is essential that the citizens will be fully respected by honoring the values contained in the OAS Inter-American Democratic Charter". In addition, the mission published a statement calling for respect for the will of the citizens.

Carlos Mesa called for civil mobilizations in defense of the vote after denouncing fraud in the elections. In a later video, Mesa called for constant protesting until a second round of voting was held, adding that he would bring proof of fraud.

Opposition candidate Óscar Ortiz called to demonstrate in peace to "maintain the legitimacy of the democratic claim."

The Bolivian Episcopal Conference (CEB) warned of fraud and demanded that the electoral authorities fulfill their duty as an "impartial arbitrator of the electoral process". The CEB also called on "international observers to fulfill their mission of monitoring the transparency of the electoral process" in order to respect the Bolivian people and the principles of democracy, noting that one of the observers for the election, the European Union, had financed the electronic vote count system and should, therefore, be mandated to ensure it is used properly.

The Minister of Justice, Héctor Arce, denied the alleged electoral fraud and said that the demonstrations are unjustified, since the electoral calculation process is free and public.

On 22 October, the Vice President of the Bolivian electoral board, Antonio Costas, described by news website Infobae as the only independent member of the TSE, resigned, criticizing the Electoral Tribunal for suspending the publication of the results of the TREP, saying that the issues with the count discredited the democratic process. Gunnar Vargas, also member of the electoral board, announced in the radio that he went into hiding for his personal safety.

The National Committee for the Defense of Democracy in Bolivia (Conade) held the Morales government responsible for any confrontation that may arise in the country and called for an indefinite national strike from midnight on the morning of 23 October.

In a televised address on 23 October, Morales made a speech saying that there was a coup d'état underway in his country that had been orchestrated by right-wing groups in Bolivia with the aid of foreign powers; earlier that day, Manuel González opined that the second round should go ahead even if Morales is revealed to have achieved a lead of over 10 percentage points, as his vote margin (based on the earlier results) would still be "negligible".

On Saturday 26 October, after international calls for an audit of the electoral processes, Morales invited foreign governments to hold one, and promised to move the election to a run-off should any fraud be found.

In the announcement on Friday 8 November, Supreme Electoral Tribunal (TSE) denied that irregularities had taken place in the vote count. TSE referred critics to a report by the company Ethical Hacking, which had checked the electronic vote and did not find any kind of "alteration of the data." But the company's chief, Alvaro Andrade, said his firm did find "vulnerabilities" in the vote count.

=== Suspension of activities ===
The Bolivian Football Federation (FBF) suspended all matches on day 17 of the Clausura tournament of the Bolivian Primera División, due to a predicted lack of presence of both players and spectators because of the protests.

The Bolivian Association of Supermarkets announced that the opening hours of supermarkets and hypermarkets for the day of 25 October would be from 7:00 am through noon.

=== Media incidents and coverage ===
A correspondent for the Cochabamba newspaper Los Tiempos, Wilson Aguilar, said he was assaulted on 21 October by MAS supporters during the Supreme Electoral Tribunal conference in La Paz.

The newspaper El Deber reported that on the night of 21 October, Vice Minister of Communication Leyla Medinacelli called the newspaper to "ask for a headline" on the front page of the next day's edition, specifying that it should encourage protesters to "demobilize". The newspaper clarified that it does not allow people who are not their own journalists to "impose a headline".

On 10 November the newspaper Página Siete announced it would not publish its morning edition of 11 November due to security reasons. The website and social media later resumed its updating. Two days later on 12 November, the newspaper El Diario announced it would not publish its print edition of that day due to security reasons, while the online edition would still be updated.

Following Morales' resignation, a large anti-Morales Twitter bot network was uncovered by the microblogging site in mid November. The network had published automated tweets which declared opposition to Morales, further adding that the events were "not a coup". Compared to the extremely low proportion of the population that speaks English, the abundance of English tweets from this network suggests that it was intended to sway opinions beyond Bolivia. The company behind the site had removed many of the tweets by 19 November, but media reports suggested that around 4200 were still up by that point. The Venezuelan government pro propaganda network Telesur alleged that nearly 70,000 fake accounts had been used by the network, many of which were created days before. A Social Networks head working for the Spanish party Podemos further alleged that fake accounts were used to artificially boost the online following of anti-Morales political figures, including Añez.

=== Later responses ===
On 21 January 2020, the interim government's Department of Justice produced a 65-page document on cases where they believed human rights had been violated. This was created with the intention of presenting these cases to be investigated by the Inter-American Commission on Human Rights (IACHR) and to different embassies and international organizations. The report is in two parts, with the second relating to events of violence, sedition and terrorism that allegedly occurred since the 20 October elections.

After the MAS returned to power in the 2020 Bolivian general election, Arce was imprisoned and tried over the killing of demonstrators during the protests and sedition. In 2025, her trial for the killings was annulled by a judge who ruled that she is entitled to a special judicial process for former heads of state handled by the Plurinational Legislative Assembly rather than the regular courts.

== See also ==
- 2008 unrest in Bolivia
- 2019 shortages in Bolivia
- List of protests in the 21st century
- 2019–2020 Mexico–Bolivia diplomatic crisis
- 2020 Bolivian protests
- 2021 Bolivian protests
