= Bolivarianism =

Left-wing nationalist movement in Latin America

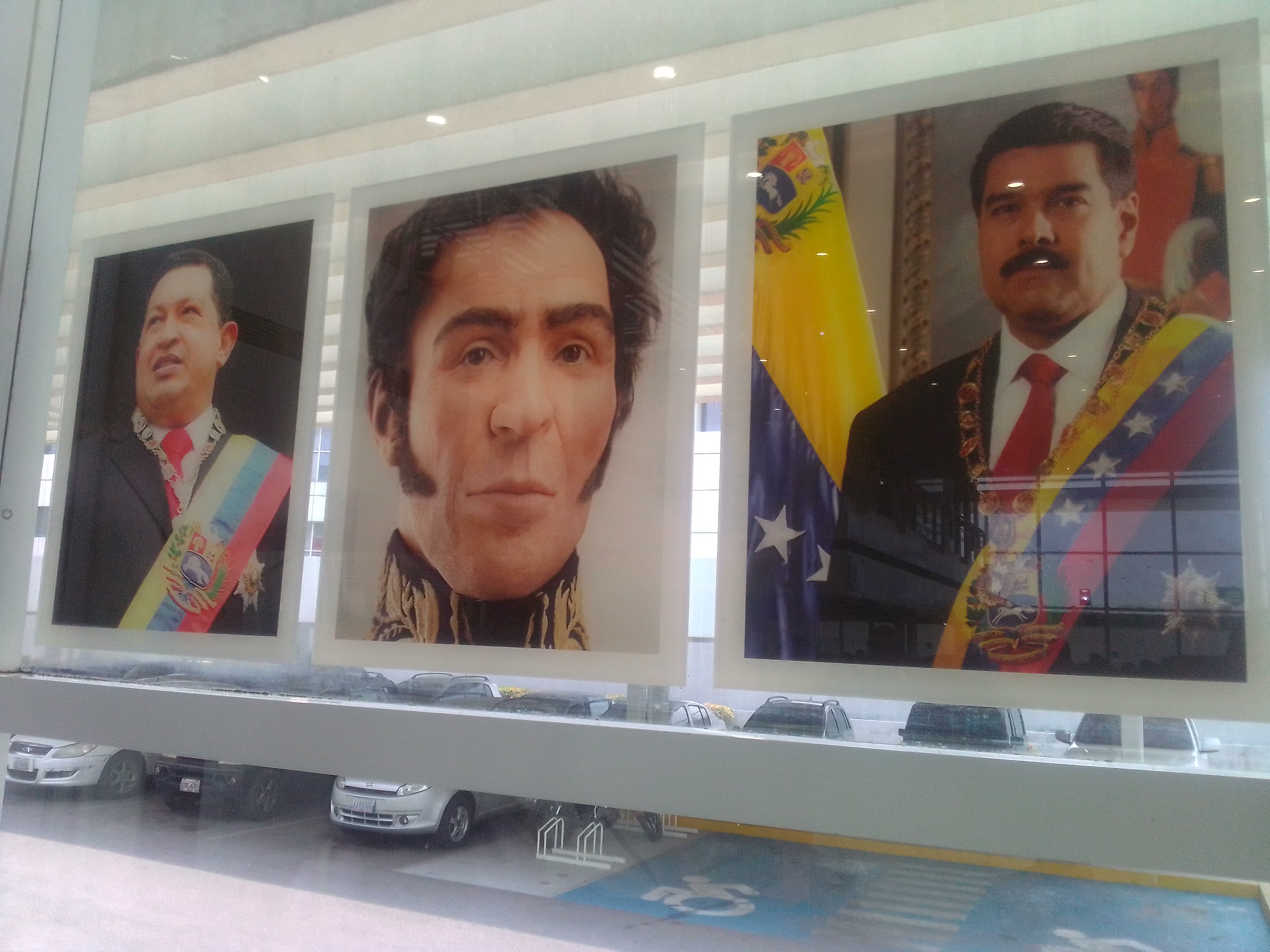
Portrait of Hugo Chávez, Simón Bolívar, and Nicolás Maduro

Bolivarianism is a mix of panhispanic, left-leaning and nationalist-patriotic ideals named after Simón Bolívar, the 19th-century Venezuelan general and liberator from the Spanish monarchy then in abeyance, who led the struggle for independence throughout much of South America.

== Bolivarianism of Hugo Chávez ==
In recent years, Bolivarianism's most significant political manifestation was in the government of Venezuela's president Hugo Chávez, who from the beginning of his presidency called himself a Bolivarian patriot and applied his interpretation of several of Bolívar's ideals to everyday affairs, as part of the Bolivarian Revolution. That included the 1999 Constitution, which changed Venezuela's name to the Bolivarian Republic of Venezuela and other ideas such as the Bolivarian Schools, Bolivarian Circles and the Bolivarian University of Venezuela. The term "Bolivarianism" is often used specifically to refer to Chávez's presidential terms.

The central points of Bolivarianism as extolled by Chávez are the following:

- Latin American economic and political sovereignty (anti-imperialism)
- Grassroots political participation of the population via popular votes and referendums (participative democracy)
- Economic self-sufficiency (in food, consumer durables and so on)
- Instilling in people a national ethic of patriotic service
- Equitable distribution of (South America's) vast natural resources
- Eliminating corruption

Chávez's version of Bolivarianism, although drawing heavily from Bolívar's ideals, was also drawn from the writings of Marxist historian Federico Brito Figueroa. Chávez was also influenced by the Hispanic American tradition of cooperativism early in his life, such as that practiced by Jorge Eliécer Gaitán, Fidel Castro, Che Guevara and Salvador Allende. Other key influences on Chávez's political philosophy include Ezequiel Zamora and Simón Rodríguez. Although Chávez himself referred to his ideology as bolivarianismo ("Bolivarianism"), Chávez's supporters and opponents in Venezuela refer to themselves as being either for or against chavismo ("Chavism"). Chávez supporters refer to themselves as chavistas.

=== Chavismo ===
Bolivarianism in Venezuela is also referred to as Chavismo or "Chavezism". Adherents are referred to as Chavistas.

Several political parties in Venezuela support Chavismo. The main party, directly affiliated with Chávez, is the United Socialist Party of Venezuela (PSUV), which replaced the Fifth Republic Movement (Spanish: Movimiento Quinta Republica, usually referred to by the three letters MVR). Other parties and movements supporting Chavismo include the Communist Party of Venezuela and Venezuelan Popular Unity.

The Movement for Socialism (Spanish: Movimiento al Socialismo or MAS) and Radical Cause (Spanish: Causa R) initially supported Chavismo, but they have since distanced themselves from it and now oppose it.

A 2002 article in The Boston Globe said Chavismo "fueled the eruption of public fury that swept the charismatic and confrontational president back into power after a group of military officers deposed him for two days in April in favor of a businessman-president", adding that the "Chavismo phenomenon has almost religious qualities".

== Other definitions and dispute ==
Historically, there has been no universally accepted definition as to the proper use of the terms "Bolivarianism" and "Bolivarian" within all the countries in the region. Many leaders, movements and parties have indistinctly used them to describe themselves throughout most of the 19th and 20th centuries.

=== Panhispanism ===
People who have called themselves bolivarianos claim to follow the general ideology expressed in Bolívar's texts such as the Carta de Jamaica and the Discurso de Angostura. Some of Bolívar's ideas include forming a union of Hispanic American countries, providing public education and enforcing sovereignty to fight against foreign invasion, which has been interpreted to include economic domination by foreign powers. An example of such a union was Gran Colombia, a block of countries consisting of Venezuela, Colombia, Panama (part of Colombia; of which in that time it was known as New Granada) and Ecuador.

The Colombian insurgent group FARC has in recent years also considered itself to be inspired by Bolívar's ideals and by his role in the 19th century independence struggle against Spain. It has also publicly declared its sympathy towards Chávez and his Bolivarian Revolution; Chávez neither confirmed nor denied any involvement with the insurgent group.

A Venezuelan guerrilla organization, the Bolivarian Forces of Liberation, also espouses Bolivarianism, although it is not known if they have any ties to the Venezuelan government.

== Spread ==
Bolivarianism was adopted by the MAS government in Bolivia and in Ecuador during The Citizens' Revolution. Opposition to the spread of Bolivarian ideals resulted in coups in both Honduras and Bolivia. Bolivarian-aligned governments were subsequently reelected in Bolivia and Honduras, while defeated in Ecuador. In the 2025 general elections, the Bolivian MAS suffered a landslide defeat after the party fractured into different factions, ending their two decade long rule.

In 2022, Gustavo Petro won the presidential elections in Colombia, and is considered to be one of the proponents of Bolivarianism in South America. Bolivarianism was a component of the M-19 movement of which he formed part during the 1980s, and which became notable for stealing, and later returning, Bolivar's alleged sword.

Aspects of Bolivarianism were adapted by the Spanish political party Podemos in the 2010s.

== See also ==
- Bolivarian propaganda
- List of political parties in Venezuela
- Socialism of the 21st century
