= FBL =

FBL may refer to:

== Commerce ==
- Family Bank, a Kenyan bank
- Faysal Bank, a Pakistani bank
- FBL Financial Group, an American financial holding company
- First Bus London, English bus operator

== Other uses ==
- Biblis station, in Hesse, Germany
- Bolivarian Forces of Liberation (Spanish: Fuerzas Bolivarianas de Liberación)
- Collège des Frères (Bab al-Louq), a school in Cairo, Egypt
- Facebook Live, a live streaming service from Facebook
- Faribault Municipal Airport (IATA code), an airport in Minnesota
- Feedback loop (email)
- Fibrillarin, a human enzyme
- Floorball League, a video game
- Friends of the British Library, a British charity
- FUFA Big League, a Ugandan football league
- West Albay Bikol language, spoken in the Philippines
- Full Bell Lines on Franklin halves
