= Mauricio Zamora =

Bolivian politician

Minister of Public Works
- Incumbent
- Assumed office 2025
- President: Rodrigo Paz

Mauricio Zamora Liebers is a Bolivian politician who has served as Minister of Public Works since 2025.

== Career ==
Zamora is a businessman from Tarija. He was appointed to the Cabinet of Bolivia by President Rodrigo Paz. In May 2026, he was ambushed by protesters amid the 2026 Bolivian protests.
