= 2024–2025 Bolivian protests =

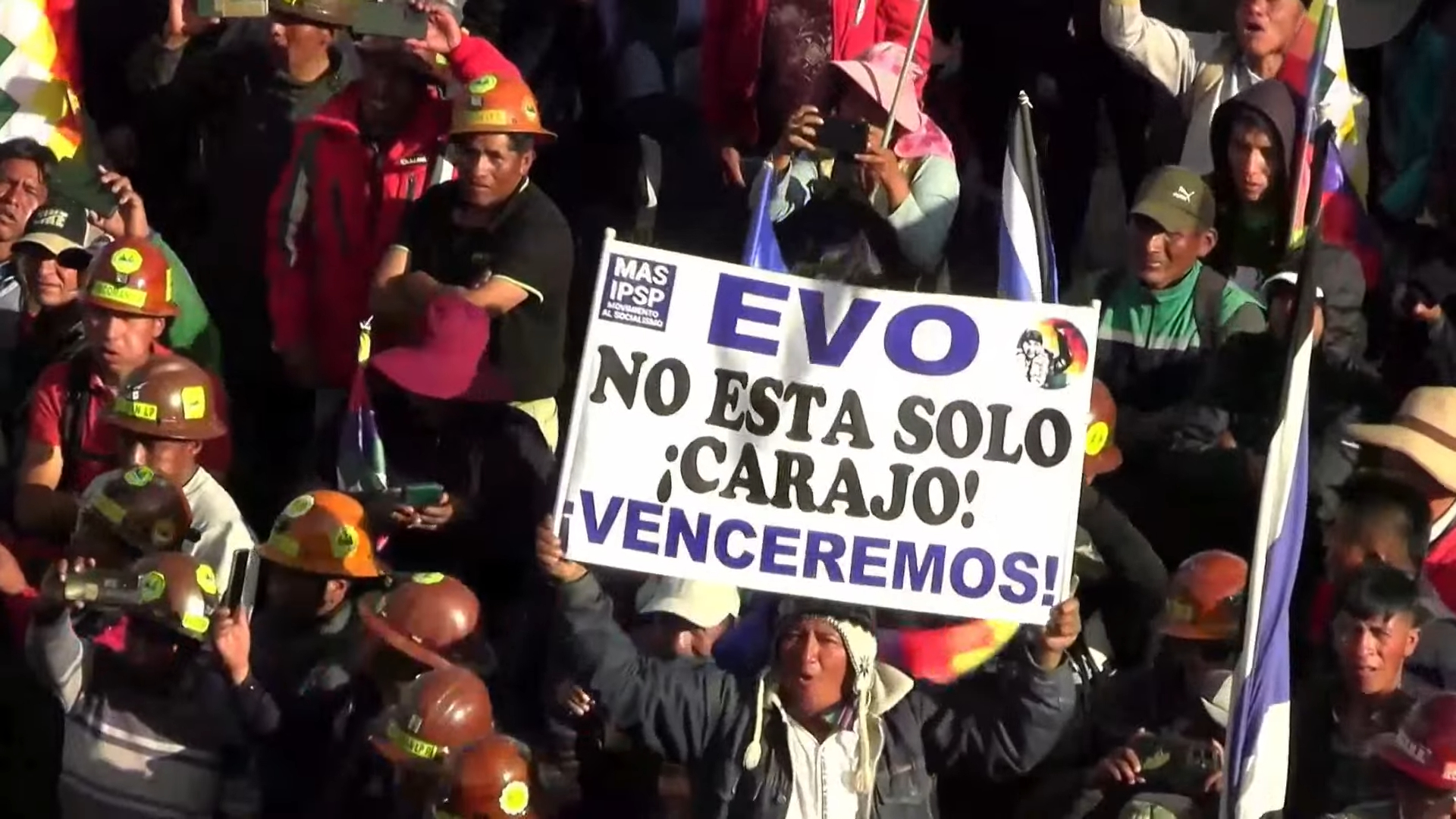
- Supporter of former President Evo Morales holding a sign that reads "Evo is not alone! Damn it, we will win!" at a rally
- Date: 17 September 2024 – 6 November 2025
- Location: Bolivia
- Caused by: Disqualification of Evo Morales' candidacy for the 2025 election
- Goals: Annulment of Supreme Court decision to disqualify Evo Morales candidacy; Resignation of Luis Arce and his government
- Result: Constitutional Court recognises Grover García as president of MAS instead of Evo Morales; Factions of MAS-IPSP nominate different candidates; Morales called for an election boycott; Pro-Morales protestors seize control of villages in Chapare Province; Deadlock in parliament; Defeat of MAS-IPSP in the 2025 election after 20 year rule.; Luis Arce was expelled from MAS-IPSP

Parties
| (Bolivia) Protesters: MAS-IPSP (Evo Morales faction); EVO Pueblo; Red Ponchos (factions against both); Six Federations; Pact of Unity (Evo Morales faction); CSUTCB (Evo Morales faction) | (Bolivia) Bolivian government: MAS-IPSP (Luis Arce faction); CdPN; Pact of Unity (Luis Arce faction); CSUTCB (Luis Arce faction); Pro-Arce counter-protesters |

Lead figures
| Evo Morales; Ponciano Santos (CSUTCB leader, disputed) Eduardo del Castillo | (Bolivia) Luis Arce (Bolivia) David Choquehuanca; Grover García; Guery García (CSUTCB leader, disputed) |

Casualties and losses
| Unknown | 4+ dead |

The 2024–2025 Bolivian protests, also known as the Arce-Morales crisis, were a series of demonstrations that began on September 16, 2024 held by former president Evo Morales against the sitting president Luis Arce government. The protests originated from a fracture between these two leading figures of Bolivian socialism governing the Plurinational State of Bolivia, leading to internal conflict within the ruling party, the Movement Towards Socialism (MAS). The first wave of protests began in the town of Caracollo in Oruro.

The demonstrations commenced with a march from the municipality of Caracollo in the Oruro Department and included roadblocks in the Bolivian Altiplano. These actions resulted from a resolution issued by leftist political organizations during a MAS-IPSP grassroots meeting held in the Cochabamba tropics. The organizations disavowed President Luis Arce and Vice President David Choquehuanca as members of the party, accusing them of being dictators and delegitimizing their constitutional authority.

MAS-IPSP under Arce's wing nominated Eduardo del Castillo for the 2025 election. Andrónico Rodríguez announced his candidacy which was rejected by Morales who called for an election boycott instead. In August 2025, the Arcista faction of CSUTCB withdrew their support for del Castillo in favour of Rodríguez. Arce was accused by the rump party of stealing party funds and was expelled on 6 November 2025.

== Background ==
The protests are situated within a complex political context, primarily centered on the 2024 judicial elections and the upcoming general elections scheduled for August 17, 2025.

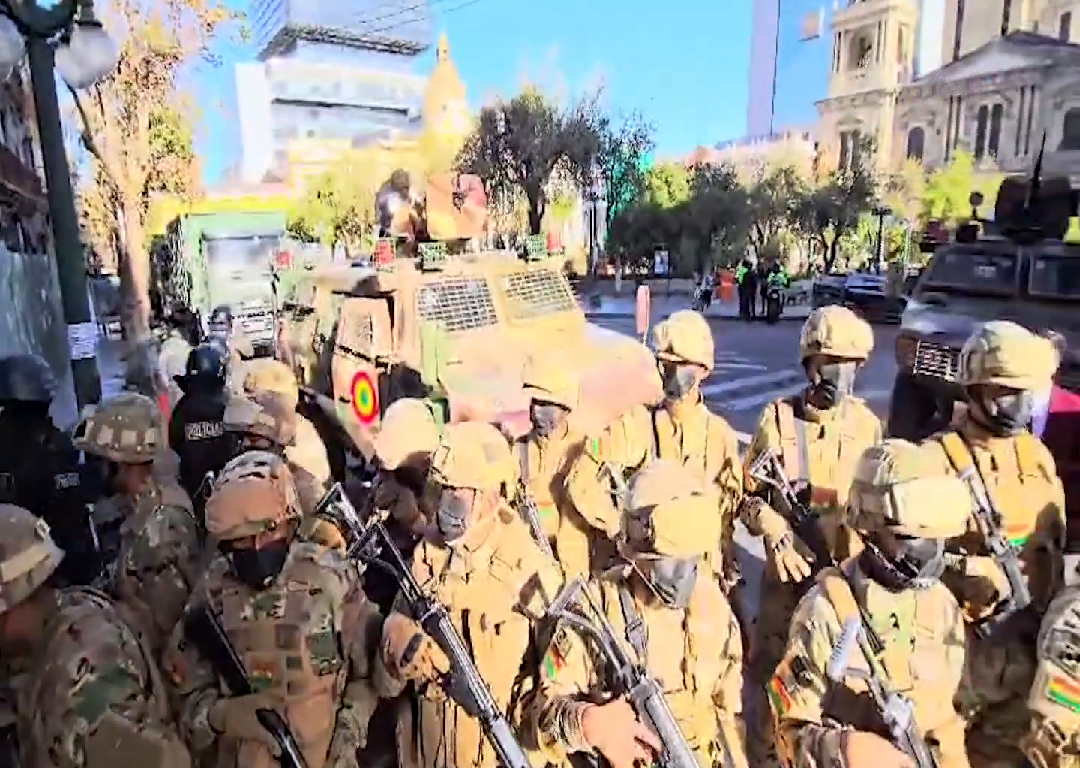
Failed 26 June coup attempt in Bolivia

In 2023, the Bolivian Supreme Court barred former president Evo Morales from seeking another presidential term in 2025 election. However, a faction of the Movement for Socialism party loyal to him tried to force the court to back down, this caused tension between Morales and his successor, and former finance minister, Luis Arce. Arce has accused Morales of trying to plan a coup against him, while Morales accused Arce of trying to eliminate his candidacy.

On 26 June the military coup aimed against Arce by General Juan José Zúñiga was thwarted. Both Arce and Morales condemned the failed coup attempt, but later on 30 June, Morales accused Arce of staging a false coup to boost his popularity in the midst of the upcoming election.

=== Participants and Factions ===
The mobilizations involve multiple actors with divergent objectives and methods:

==== Political Factions ====
- Supporters of President Luis Arce
- Supporters of former President Evo Morales

==== Other Participating Groups ====
- Subversive organizations
- Social movements
- Labor unions
- Members of the Movement Towards Socialism – Political Instrument for the Sovereignty of the Peoples (MAS-IPSP)

=== Nature of Demonstrations ===
The protests exhibit significant internal heterogeneity, ranging from:

- Peaceful demonstrations
- Confrontational episodes involving law enforcement
- Instances of localized violence

=== Significance ===
The protests reflect ongoing political tensions within Bolivia's contemporary political landscape, highlighting internal divisions within left-wing political movements.

=== Political Position of Luis Arce's Faction ===
==== Key Demands ====
Demand for respect of presidential mandate Assertion of democratic legitimacy through electoral victory Request for Plurinational Legislative Assembly to approve international credits.

==== Proposed Credit Utilization ====
Credits sought from:

- International Monetary Fund
- Other international financial entities

==== Intended Public Spending Targets ====
- Health infrastructure
- Educational systems
- General infrastructure development

=== Political Rationale ===
The faction argues that international credits would enable expanded public investment in critical social sectors, framing the request as essential for national development and meeting citizens' needs.

== Chronology ==
=== Early conflicts ===
In October 2023, the faction loyal to Evo Morales of the Movimiento al Socialismo held a congress which expelled Luis Arce and other members of the government and declared Morales their presidential candidate. In January 2024, CSUTCB expelled Evo Morales.

=== 16 September: Beginning of the protests ===
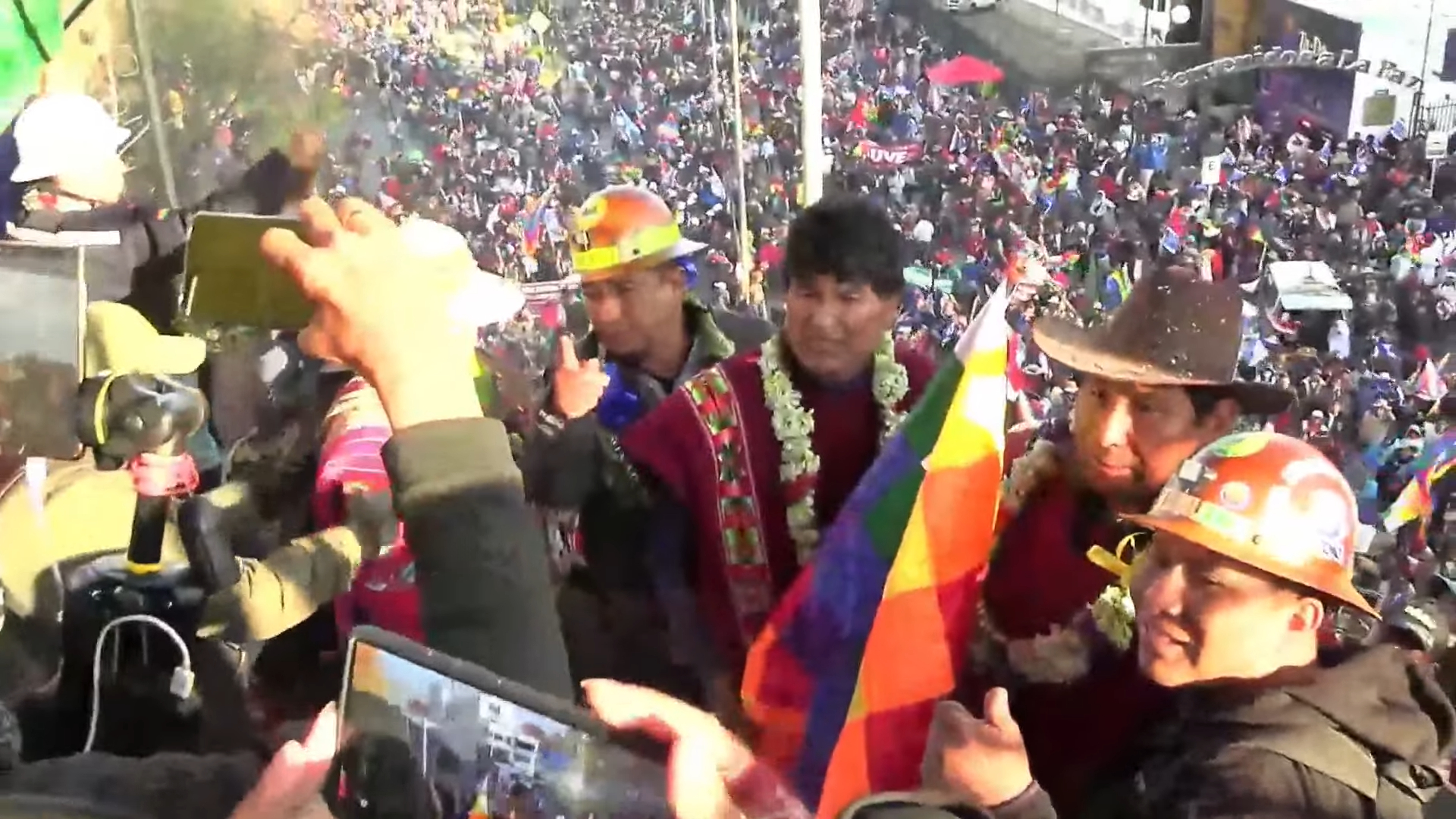
Former president Evo Morales joining the March to Save Bolivia

The early stage of the protests broke out in first hour of 16 September when a group of Red Ponchos and trade unionists organised a march demanding the resignation of president Luis Arce and his government. The Red Ponchos said to have blocked the road access to the capital La Paz.

=== 17 September: March to Save Bolivia ===
The march to La Paz began on the morning of 17 September with meeting point being concentrated in Caracollo, Oruro. Barricades were set up by protesters on most Bolivian highways that connect each departments in Bolivia. During the march, Morales challenged Arce and accusing his government of rampant injustice and inequality. The Bolivian Highway Administration (ABC) reported that there 7 blocking points on the highway on Omasuyos Province, La Paz Department alone.

In Vila Vila, the clashes reportedly erupt between the pro-Morales faction and pro-Arce faction of protesters. Protesters from both factions are seen throwing rocks and fireworks on each other without any police presence in the location. Some of protesters were able to get out of the town and continued to march to Palacio Quemado, La Paz.

=== 23 September: More clashes and ultimatum ===
On 23 September, violence continues to erupt between supporters of both factions of the ruling party in Plaza Murillo, La Paz. Bolivian National Police and Arce supporters gathered in the plaza to defend the Plurinational Legislative Assembly building and Palacio Quemado where both buildings are located near the plaza. As protesters from both sides are firing at each others with stones and firecrackers, riot police begin to open fire against the protesters by throwing tear gas. Other clashes were also reported in adjacent city of El Alto.

At the same time, former president Evo Morales has given Luis Arce government ultimatum to make cabinet change within 24 hours or expect more protests from his supporters. Morales also stated that the Bolivian people had “enough of betrayal and above all enough of corruption, protection of drug trafficking and economic mismanagement”. Bolivian foreign minister Celinda Sosa Lunda rejected Morales ultimatum and said his ultimatum has threatened the country democratic stability. president Luis Arce and vice-president David Choquehuanca later demanded Morales to come for a dialogue on Sunday to resolve the internal conflict and avoid further violence that could cause a "civil war".

=== 27–28 October: Assassination attempt against Morales ===
On 27 October, Morales said that he was targeted by an assassination attempt backed by the Bolivian government. The Bolivian government denied this however.

In the days following the assassination attempt, Pro-Morales protestors occupied a military barrack holding up to 200 military personnel hostage. A standoff had already developed before the occupation, with protestors throwing dynamite at the Bolivian police from nearby hills while police responded with tear gas.

=== November 2024: Party Split ===
On 15 November 2024, Constitutional Court recognises Grover García as president of MAS instead of Evo Morales.

On 20 February 2025, Morales agreed to run for the Front for the Victory (FPV). On 31 March 2025, Morales launched EVO Pueblo to run for the 2025 election. On 20 May 2025, the TSE announced that both parties cannot compete and its license was annulled because they had not won 3% in the 2020 general election.

On 3 May 2025, Andrónico Rodríguez announced his bit for president. On 16 May 2025, MAS nominated Eduardo del Castillo as candidate after Acre withdrew the day earlier. On 18 May 2025, Popular Alliance announced that Rodríguez will be their candidate.

=== June 2025: Militant clashes ===
In June 2025, Pro-Morales protestors blocked highways across the country and fought with officials who attempted to clear the blockade, resulting in the deaths of several police officers and one firefighter. The government blamed these clashes on pro-Morales paramilitaries and deployed tanks on 12 June to Llallagua, where the most significant clashes between authorities and protesters occurred.

== See also ==
- 2024 Bolivian coup attempt
