= Bolivarian Forces of Liberation =

Bolivarian Communist guerrilla group in Venezuela

- Fuerzas Bolivarianas de Liberación
- Dates active: 1992–present
- Country: Venezuela
- Ideology: Bolivarianism; Communism
- Political position: Left-wing
- Size: 4,000 (2005)
- Website: FBL Website

The Bolivarian Forces of Liberation (Spanish: Fuerzas Bolivarianas de Liberación FBL) is a communist guerrilla organization operating in Venezuela. The group claims to fight against Maduro and the Venezuelan government in support of Bolivarianism, a left-wing, South American ideology. The group was formerly known as the Bolivarian Forces of Liberation – Liberation Army (Spanish: Fuerzas Bolivarianas de Liberación – Ejército Libertador FBL-EL), but they have not attached the suffix to their name in recent years.

== History ==
Following the 1992 Venezuelan coup d'état attempts by Hugo Chávez and his co-conspirators, the FBL formed in 1992 as a left-wing nationalist militia to defend against potential entry of Colombian paramilitary brigades and "invasion by imperialist forces". Prior to the election of Hugo Chávez, it was alleged that the FBL had been involved with student movements, including Utopía, a leftist student movement that was led by Hugo Cabezas and Tareck El Aissami at the University of the Andes.

Alto Apure, Apure, where the Bolivarian Forces of Liberation are located, just north of Colombia.

Following the rise of Hugo Chávez and the establishment of his Bolivarian Revolution, the FBL began to support Chávez. Following the election of Hugo Chávez, the FBL grew 50% by 2005, amounting to about 4,000 members located in Alto Apure, Apure according to a Venezuelan government source speaking to El Universal. The FBL also operated with the complicity of the local chavista government of Apure, with chavista mayor Jorge Rodríguez being the head of Alto Apure. The Federal Research Division of the Library of Congress wrote at the time that the FBL worked with the leftist Colombian guerrilla group, Revolutionary Armed Forces of Colombia People's Army (FARC), to kidnap and extort Venezuelans near the Colombia-Venezuela border. The FBL was also tasked with fighting against "intervention by U.S. and other foreign forces".

In 2007, the group was accused by a priest in Guasdualito of having recruited young people to become child soldiers, an accusation which was rejected by FBL spokespeople. In a 2008 report by The Guardian, it is stated that President Chávez had been using the FBL "for the purpose of defending the motherland in case of American invasion", and that "Farc gave military training to the Bolivarian Forces of Liberation". There were rumors in 2009 that the group was in the process of disbanding, though the FBL denied this claim.

Although relatively supportive of former Venezuelan president Hugo Chávez for his commitment to anti-imperialism, the group grew disgruntled with the direction of the Bolivarian Revolution after his death in 2013, citing president Nicolas Maduro's policy of currency intervention as nothing more than a tactic that would delay an economic crisis.
