= 2024 Bolivian judicial election =

The 2024 Bolivian judicial election was scheduled to be held on 15 December 2024.

== Background ==
The mandate of high judicial authorities who took office in 2018 ended on 31 December 2023. The judicial election system is controversial.

More than 7.3 million voters were eligible to elect the judges of the Supreme Court of Justice (TSJ), Constitutional Tribunal (TCP), Agro-environmental Court and the Council of the Magistracy. The elections were held in a complete way only in La Paz, Oruro, Potosí and Chuquisaca, which are four of the nine regions of the country.

In the departments of Beni, Pando, Cochabamba, Tarija and Santa Cruz, voters were not able to vote for the candidates for the TCP, while in Beni and Pando, the judges of the TSJ were also not be elected. These were the first judicial elections in Bolivian history which were conducted in a partial manner.

== Agro-environmental Court ==
Each citizen could vote for one person. The ballot was the same for every citizen nationwide. Three of the elected judges were recommended by the opposition, while two were recommended by MAS-IPSP.

Candidate	Votes	%	Notes
Rocio Vasquez Noza	675,283	17.90%	Elected as titular
Roxana Chavez Rodas	444,335	11.78%	Elected as titular
Victor Hugo Claure Hinojoza	395,823	10.49%	Elected as titular
Richard Cristhian Méndez Rosales	386,253	10.24%	Elected as titular
María Soledad Peñafiel Bravo	376,867	9.99%	Elected as titular
Edwin Almendras Vasquez	351,300	9.31%	Elected as alternate
Fabiola Lizzeth Arcani Herbas	239,346	6.34%	Elected as alternate
Maribel Modesta Ruiz Molina	237,627	6.30%	Elected as alternate
Susana Yvon Avila Vargas	204,263	5.41%	Elected as alternate
Teodosio Rufino Huanca Aduviri	185,654	4.92%	Elected as alternate
Rudy Ariel Paca Ancalle	160,162	4.25%	
Domingo de Siles Laime Ponce	115,626	3.06%	
Total	3,772,539	100.00%	
Valid votes	3,772,539	62.69%	
Blank and null votes	2,244,941	37.31%	
Total votes	6,017,480	100.00%	
Registered voters/Turnout	7,334,435	82.04%	
Source: OEP

== Council of the Magistracy ==
Each citizen could vote for one person. The ballot was the same for every citizen nationwide. All three of the elected judges were recommended by the opposition.

Candidate	Votes	%	Notes
Manuel Baptista Espinoza	904,818	23.34%	Elected as titular
Carlos Spencer Arancibia	550,177	14.19%	Elected as titular
Gabriela Paula Araoz López	331,712	8.56%	Elected as titular
Julio Jhonny Rocha Jiménez	219,635	5.67%	Elected as alternate
Dora Espada Perez	218,280	5.63%	Elected as alternate
Freddy Barbolin Plantarrosa	209,939	5.42%	Elected as alternate
Carminia Alejandra Martinez Cusicanqui	168,363	4.34%	
Ramiro Froilán Canedo Chávez	167,756	4.33%	
Gregorio Merlo Chura	143,649	3.71%	
Ludgarda Martinez Borja	116,802	3.01%	
Patricia Felisa Castillo Siles	114,029	2.94%	
Juan Carlos Arellano Paz	106,108	2.74%	
Ruth Isabel Zeballos Saavedra	102,756	2.65%	
Candidates with under 100,000 votes	522,636	13.48%	7 candidates
Total	3,876,660	100.00%	
Valid votes	3,876,660	64.29%	
Blank and null votes	2,153,044	35.71%	
Total votes	6,029,704	100.00%	
Registered voters/Turnout	7,334,435	82.21%	
Source: OEP

== Supreme Tribunal of Justice ==
Each citizen could vote for one male candidate and one female candidate; the winner with more votes was elected as the titular magistrate, while the winner with fewer votes was elected at the deputy magistrate. Each department had different ballots. Five of the elected judges were recommended by the opposition, while two were recommended by MAS-IPSP. In two departments (Beni and Pando) elections to the TSJ were not held and the judges were not elected.

=== Chiquisaca ===
==== Men ====
Candidate	Votes	%	Notes
Carlos Eduardo Ortega Sivila	83,315	44.55%	Elected as titular
Favio Chacolla Huanca	63,855	34.14%	
Humberto Ortega Martinez	39,856	21.31%	
Total	187,026	100.00%	
Valid votes	187,026	63.56%	
Blank and null votes	107,224	36.44%	
Source: OEP

==== Women ====
Candidate	Votes	%	Notes
Janethe Esperanza Castro Martinez	72,121	44.67%	Elected as alternate
Patricia Bohorquez Barrientos	48,545	30.07%	
Lilian Paredes Gonzales	40,771	25.26%	
Total	161,437	100.00%	
Valid votes	161,437	54.86%	
Blank and null votes	132,842	45.14%	
Source: OEP

=== La Paz ===
==== Men ====
Candidate	Votes	%	Notes
Ivan Ramiro Campero Villalba	429,091	40.66%	Elected as alternate
Felix Orlando Rojas Alcon	335,606	31.80%	
Ramiro Ariel Julio Blanco Fuentes	290,575	27.54%	
Total	1,055,272	100.00%	
Valid votes	1,055,272	61.77%	
Blank and null votes	653,034	38.23%	
Source: OEP

==== Women ====
Candidate	Votes	%	Notes
Fanny Coaquira Rodriguez	595,826	62.51%	Elected as titular
Yovana Carla Soria Pinaya	357,301	37.49%	
Total	953,127	100.00%	
Valid votes	953,127	55.79%	
Blank and null votes	755,401	44.21%	
Source: OEP

=== Cochabamba ===
==== Men ====
Candidate	Votes	%	Notes
German Saul Pardo Uribe	409,445	74.15%	Elected as titular
Pablo Antezana Vargas	142,704	25.85%	
Total	552,149	100.00%	
Valid votes	552,149	47.26%	
Blank and null votes	616,091	52.74%	
Source: OEP

==== Women ====
Candidate	Votes	%	Notes
Delina Irma Zurita Herbas	288,190	49.34%	Elected as alternate
Sarina Sandra Marañon Revollo	161,190	27.59%	
Candida Mendez Rorrico	134,763	23.07%	
Total	584,143	100.00%	
Valid votes	584,143	49.98%	
Blank and null votes	584,659	50.02%	
Source: OEP

=== Oruro ===
==== Men ====
Candidate	Votes	%	Notes
Primo Martinez Fuentes	70,629	38.26%	Elected as titular
Jose Miguel Vasquez Castelo	63,223	34.25%	
Lino Omar Belmonte Galindo	27,694	15.00%	
Daniel Rolando Copa Roque	23,053	12.49%	
Total	184,599	100.00%	
Valid votes	184,599	60.54%	
Blank and null votes	120,346	39.46%	
Source: OEP

==== Women ====
Candidate	Votes	%	Notes
Yesika Maura Daga Prialet	58,538	37.36%	Elected as alternate
Nancy Blanco Fernandez	54,469	34.76%	
Monica Carol Flores Lopez	43,689	27.88%	
Total	156,696	100.00%	
Valid votes	156,696	51.41%	
Blank and null votes	148,124	48.59%	
Source: OEP

=== Potosí ===
==== Men ====
Candidate	Votes	%	Notes
Octavio Boris Janco Villegas	73,014	32.29%	Elected as alternate
Marvin Arsenio Molina Casanova	69,654	30.80%	
Grover Roberto Gutierrez Mamani	43,017	19.02%	
Efrain Erick Olañeta Burgo	40,437	17.88%	
Total	226,122	100.00%	
Valid votes	226,122	58.35%	
Blank and null votes	161,422	41.65%	
Source: OEP

==== Women ====
Candidate	Votes	%	Notes
Norma Velasco Mosquera	86,842	40.53%	Elected as titular
Hjovanna Magaly Alarcon Duran	70,215	32.77%	
Yacira Yarusca Cardozo Calizaya	57,195	26.70%	
Total	214,252	100.00%	
Valid votes	214,252	55.29%	
Blank and null votes	173,225	44.71%	
Source: OEP

=== Tarija ===
==== Men ====
Candidate	Votes	%	Notes
Samuel Grover Mita Aquino	64,252	33.51%	Elected as alternate
Hermes Flores Eguez	52,196	27.22%	
Marcos Ramiro Miranda Guerrero	49,578	25.85%	
Zacarias Valeriano Rodriguez	25,735	13.42%	
Total	191,761	100.00%	
Valid votes	191,761	63.06%	
Blank and null votes	112,318	36.94%	
Source: OEP

==== Women ====
Candidate	Votes	%	Notes
Rosmery Ruiz Martinez	110,606	55.19%	Elected as titular
Maria Isabel Moreno Cortez	89,811	44.81%	
Total	200,417	100.00%	
Valid votes	200,417	65.88%	
Blank and null votes	103,783	34.12%	
Source: OEP

=== Santa Cruz ===
==== Men ====
Candidate	Votes	%	Notes
Romer Saucedo Gomez	738,457	70.01%	Elected as titular
Roberto Parada Mole	160,217	15.19%	
Mirael Salguero Palma	156,145	14.80%	
Total	1,054,819	100.00%	
Valid votes	1,054,819	66.37%	
Blank and null votes	534,588	33.63%	
Source: OEP

==== Women ====
Candidate	Votes	%	Notes
Mirian Rosell Terrazas	717,681	73.52%	Elected as alternate
Arminda Mendez Terrazas	258,505	26.48%	
Total	976,186	100.00%	
Valid votes	976,186	61.41%	
Blank and null votes	613,537	38.59%	
Source: OEP

== Plurinational Constitutional Tribunal ==
Each citizen could vote for one candidate. Each department had different ballots. Two of the elected judges were recommended by the opposition, while two were recommended by MAS-IPSP. In five departments (Beni, Pando, Cochabamba, Tarija and Santa Cruz) elections to the TCP were not held and the judges were not elected.

=== Chiquisaca ===
Candidate	Votes	%	Notes
Angel Edson Davalos Rojas	43,659	22.59%	Elected as titular
Juan Carlos Mendoza Garcia	41,738	21.60%	Elected as alternate
Marco Antonio Baldivieso Jines	29,256	15.14%	
Paul Amilcar Tolavi Soruco	27,823	14.40%	
Nataly Patricia Flores Aguanta	22,491	11.64%	
Juana Atanacia Maturano Trigo	14,788	7.65%	
Hilda Mora Mora	13,511	6.99%	
Total	193,266	100.00%	
Valid votes	193,266	65.68%	
Blank and null votes	100,988	34.32%	
Source: OEP

=== La Paz ===
Candidate	Votes	%	Notes
Boris Wilson Arias Lopez	323,673	30.20%	Elected as titular
Mariela Sanchez Salas	195,200	18.21%	Elected as alternate
Pedro Rolando Cusi Chambi	186,991	17.45%	
Israel Ramiro Campero Mendez	102,909	9.60%	
Miryam Virginia Aguilar Rodriguez	86,487	8.07%	
Angelica Siles Parrado	68,387	6.38%	
Maria Irene Vino Mejia	62,573	5.84%	
Freddy Huaraz Murillo	45,467	4.24%	
Total	1,071,687	100.00%	
Valid votes	1,071,687	62.73%	
Blank and null votes	636,644	37.27%	
Source: OEP

=== Oruro ===
Candidate	Votes	%	Notes
Paola Veronica Prudencio Candia	59,693	32.59%	Elected as titular
Luz Veronica Moya Cayoja	55.496	30.30%	Elected as alternate
Juan Lixmar Zoto Alvarado	35,083	19.15%	
Rene Victor Jimenez Pastor	32,901	17.96%	
Total	183,173	100.00%	
Valid votes	183,173	60.07%	
Blank and null votes	121,770	39.93%	
Source: OEP

=== Potosí ===
Candidate	Votes	%	Notes
Amalia Laura Villca	133,721	58.95%	Elected as titular
Julio Alberto Miranda Martinez	93,126	41.05%	Elected as alternate
Total	226,847	100.00%	
Valid votes	226,847	58.57%	
Blank and null votes	160,456	41.43%	
Source: OEP

== See also ==
- Elections in Bolivia
