= FEJUVE =

Political organization in Bolivia

Federation of Neighborhood Councils-El Alto
- Federación de Juntas Vecinales de El Alto
- The Bolivian Wiphala
- Abbreviation: FEJUVE
- Formation: 1979; 47 years ago
- Type: Federation of neighborhood councils
- Purpose: Provision of universal basic services
- Methods: Participatory democracy
- Members: c. 540 neighborhood councils encompassing about 750,000 people (2004)
- Official languages: Spanish; Aymara; Quechua

The Federation of Neighborhood Councils-El Alto (Spanish: Federación de Juntas Vecinales de El Alto, FEJUVE) is a federation of almost 600 neighborhood councils that provide public services, construction and jobs to citizens of El Alto, Bolivia. Councils of the FEJUVE organise according to the principles of participatory democracy and consensus decision-making, while implementing systems of workers' self-management in the city's economy.

Based in the traditional organisational methods of the Aymara people, neighborhood councils were first established by residents of El Alto in the wake of the Bolivian National Revolution, in order to provide services for local inhabitants where the state had little presence. In 1979, these neighborhood councils united into a single Federation, the FEJUVE. Over the subsequent decades, the FEJUVE built infrastructure, schools and parks, and provided public utilities for many of El Alto's residents. The FEJUVE went on to participate in the Bolivian gas conflict of 2003, during which they took over management of most of the city's economy and organised a blockade of the capital of La Paz.

In the 2005 Bolivian general election, the FEJUVE supported the candidacy of Evo Morales and his Movimiento al Socialismo (MAS). Many members of the FEJUVE joined the new government under a policy of "constructive but critical collaboration", with FEJUVE leader Mabel Monje becoming the country's Minister of Water. This move was criticised by some of its members, who questioned whether the FEJUVE would be able to maintain their autonomy under the new government. While many of the FEJUVE's proposals were not taken up by the MAS government, they managed to push it to support their policies of public housing, participatory planning, and workers' control in El Alto.

== History ==
=== Background ===
During the Bolivian National Revolution of 1952, the government of Víctor Paz Estenssoro redistributed land to peasants from the highlands, while providing financial support to lowland farms that were dedicated to commercial agriculture. The indigenous peoples in Bolivia, who largely practiced traditional methods of farming, eventually found themselves unable to compete with the cheap food that was imported into the country, following the economic restructuring programs of the neoliberal era. The government shutdown many of the country's mines and small farms, leading to thousands of miners being displaced and large sections of the peasantry being expelled from Altiplano, with many of them settling in the small town of El Alto.

The small town quickly became a major urban center, with over 850,000 residents, largely made up of indigenous Aymara and Quechua people. The Bolivian state had little presence in the city, leaving its residents without infrastructure like paved roads, waste management or telephone networks, and even without basic necessities such as running water and electricity. Three quarters of the city's residents had no access to healthcare and nearly half of them were not literate. 70% of the population earned a living from small family businesses, forming a city-wide informal economy that has only expanded since the implementation of neoliberalism.

=== Foundation ===
In response to the widespread poverty, corruption and violence in El Alto, during the 1950s, the city's residents started to form their first self-organized neighborhood councils (Spanish: Juntas), based on the traditional practices of the local Aymara people. In 1957, the first council was established in order to provide a program of universal basic services for the new residents. The councils increasingly coordinated with each other and, by 1979, had united together into a federation, establishing the Federation of Neighborhood Councils (FEJUVE). The first political demonstrations organized by the FEJUVE took place in 1987; they demanded the paving of the Pan-American Highway, the provision of electricity and drinking water, and the establishment of a hospital and a public university in El Alto.

=== Divisions and democratization ===
During the first years of its existence, in the 1980s, a certain amount of social stratification existed between the leadership and the grassroots membership of the FEJUVE. Members reported that the council leadership was often elitist and largely kept decision-making power to themselves, only occasionally sharing them with the assemblies, while political party activists sought to gain control over the organization to serve their electoral ambitions. Initially, the FEJUVE leadership only questioned the "opportunism" of the party activists, which were offering neighborhood activists favors in exchange for votes. But the FEJUVE and the Bolivian Workers' Center (COB) were soon coopted by a new left-wing political party, the Conscience of Fatherland (CONDEPA). The FEJUVE subsequently lost its autonomy, as its leadership was brought under the control of CONDEPA. By the early 1990s, this had resulted in a fragmentation of the FEJUVE; it initially divided into factions that supported the Patriotic Accord (AP) and the Solidarity Civic Unity (UCS), then split into two entirely separate federations.

But by this time, the FEJUVE grassroots was already pushing the organization towards more autonomy for its grassroots organs and the decentralization and democratization of decision-making. The experience of the miners' unions, which were used to organizing outside of state and political party control, provided further impulse to the democratization of the FEJUVE. In response to the factional division of the FEJUVE, the grassroots base also divided itself. The grassroots strategy was to disperse themselves within both conferences of the FEJUVE, so that they could regain influence over the organization without supporting either political tendency. They also established the El Alto Assembly, which gave control back to the local councils and trade unions. The Assembly oversaw strike actions and the construction of infrastructure projects, providing a grassroots democratic alternative to the political party domination.

By the end of the 1990s, the local councils had regained control over the FEJUVE, while the CONDEPA progressively dissolved as its clientele network evaporated. The democratization process halted the previous leadership's capacity to act as an intermediary between the councils and the state political parties. Grassroots activists became more suspicious of leadership figures, who were increasingly scrutinized for political corruption. The FEJUVE leadership was replaced and the assemblies took greater control over the organization, in order to prevent a repeat of the monopolization of power by the leadership. It became increasingly difficult for the leadership to operated unilaterally, without popular consent; on one occasion, after FEJUVE president Mauricio Cori was accused of allegedly negotiating for a position in municipal governments and a state company, he was publicly beaten and stripped of his clothes.

=== Consolidation ===
In 1994, the government of Gonzalo Sánchez de Lozada passed the Law of Popular Participation (LPP), which devolved a fifth of the national budget to local municipalities, giving local communities a participatory role in budgeting and urban planning. In return for legal recognition, the LPP imposed new organizational standards on FEJUVE, requiring it to meet certain legal requirements and to include women in its leadership structures. This new law increased the FEJUVE's influence significantly, with neighborhood councils beginning to function as the de facto local governments, subverting the influence of state governance.

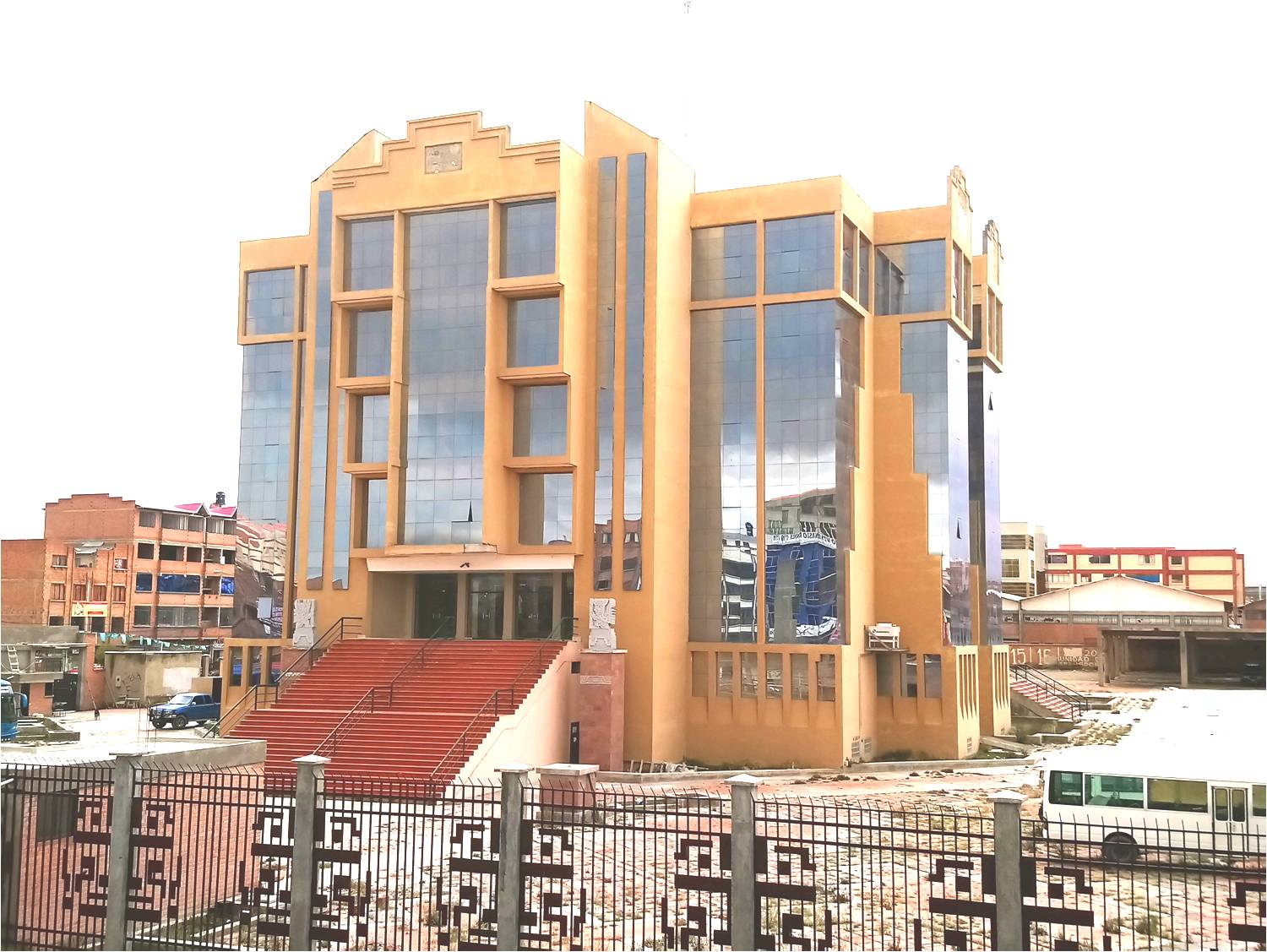
The Public University of El Alto.

The councils provided the means for residents of El Alto to develop their own communities, without state intervention. Residents pooled their resources and skills within the neighborhood councils, securing the purchase of land, the construction of schools and public parks, and the installation of utility services. The councils also acted as the de facto regulation authority in the city, overseeing property transactions, mediating disputes between neighbors and establishing a form of community justice that has resulted in El Alto's relatively low crime rate. FEJUVE has also acted to mobilize their neighborhoods in protest against the government: leading the movement for the establishment of the Public University of El Alto in 1998; preventing the implementation of a tax on home construction in 2003; and putting an end to water privatization in 2005.

=== Conflict ===
During the Bolivian gas conflict, the infrastructure that FEJUVE had already built provided a means for El Alto's citizens to resist the government.

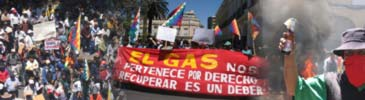
Protests during the Bolivian gas conflict.

The local culture of collective identity, tied closely to both the neighborhood councils and the residents' original communities in Altiplano, linked urban and rural communities together. Despite peasant roadblocks causing food shortages and inflation in El Alto, urban residents maintained their solidarity with the peasantry. The conflict also ignited a reconciliation of indigenous struggles with the trade union movement, as both the indigenous peasant and mining cultures of El Alto reinforced each-other, with elements of the two converging into a collective resistance. A general strike shut down El Alto, with thousands mobilizing in popular demonstrations. A sense of collective responsibility, inherited from the practices of the Ayllu, encouraged a high level of popular participation in neighborhood campaigns, through a system of both individual benefits and penalties.

The grassroots organizing of the resistance was strengthened by traditional practices of direct democracy, with horizontally-organized assemblies utilizing consensus decision-making to facilitate collective action. The neighborhood councils organized roadblocks, social kitchens and community self-defense, rotating shifts in order to keep the protest going continuously. Councils also worked together with the trade unions to facilitate access to markets and roads for the local populace. The FEJUVE itself did not lead the events, as it was guided by the indigenous principle of "leading by obeying" (Spanish: mandar obedeciendo). One FEJUVE leader noted of the protest movement:

We were no longer an executive, the people didn’t take any notice [of us]. The people rose up [...] They triumphed, not us [the leaders]. We simply obeyed orders.

Neighborhood councils seized control of resources, territory and infrastructure from the government, which provided El Alto with a high degree of autonomy from the state. The FEJUVE organized a blockade of La Paz, effectively placing the capital under siege, even shutting down the airport to cut the city off from the world. The social cohesion associated with the neighborhood councils was consolidated during this period of insurrection; sociologist Álvaro García Linera himself believes that El Alto's "community of neighbors" was formed during the uprising. Emily Achtenberg has compared the autonomy achieved during the conflict to dual power, implemented earlier by the soviets during the Russian Revolution. But the FEJUVE nevertheless refused to seize state power, instead laying the groundwork for a broader political shift that culminated in the election of Evo Morales in 2005.

=== Socialist period ===
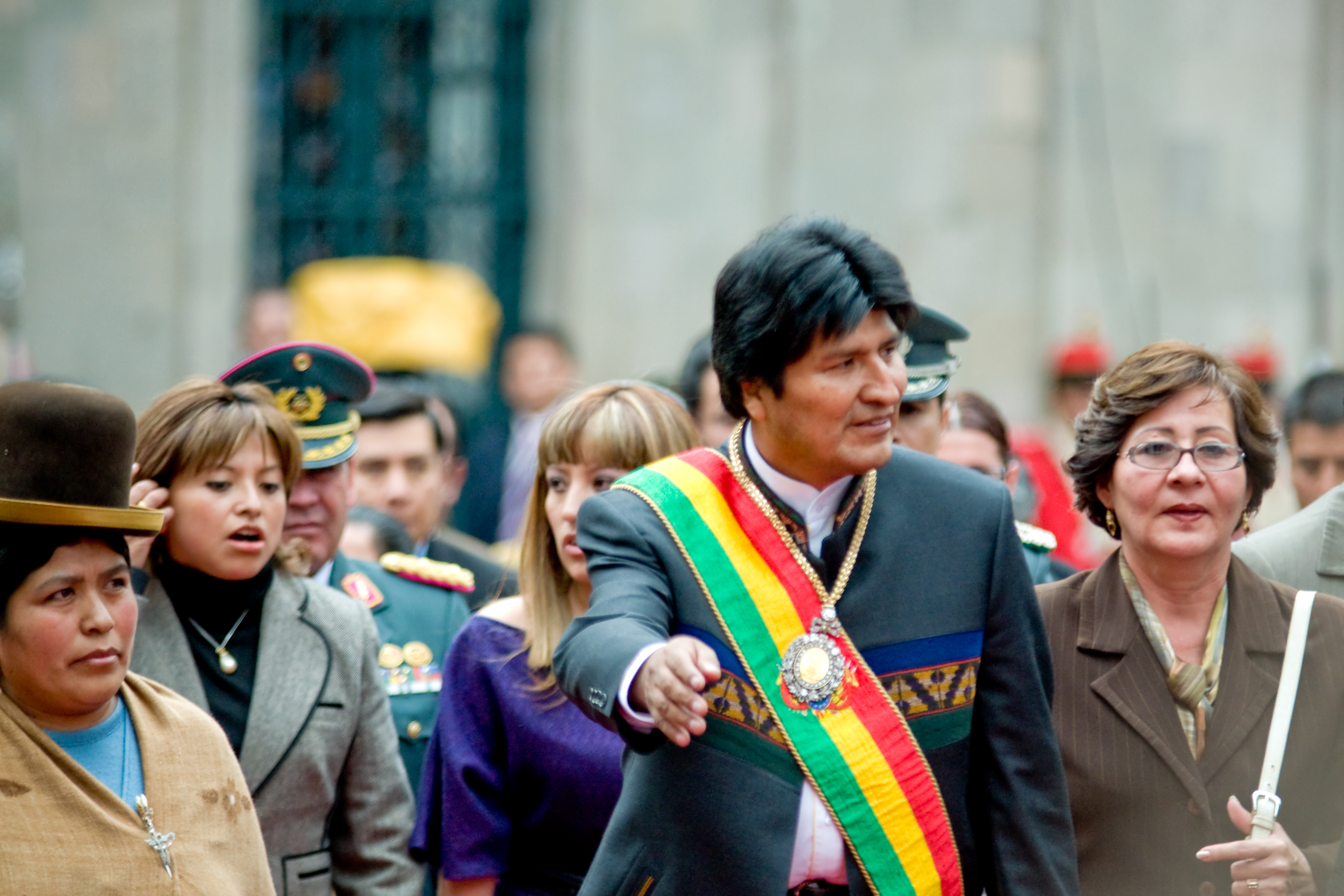
Evo Morales, the socialist President of Bolivia (2006-2019).

The government of Evo Morales and the Movement for Socialism (MAS) was brought to power by the promise to implement the "October Agenda", proposed by social movements including the FEJUVE, which would reintroduce popular sovereignty over natural resources and reconstitute the Bolivian state along the lines of plurinationalism. But the efforts of the government to implement this were frustrated by the country's integration in the globalized economy and decades of neoliberalism. The nationalization of oil supplies was met with cutbacks in private investment, agribusiness restricted agrarian reform to the redistribution of already publicly-held lands, while the new plurinational constitution was stonewalled by the right-wing representatives of the Media Luna.

FEJUVE found itself caught between its own autonomy and the new left-wing government, when a number of its leaders became members of the government, leading some to question whether the Federation remained independent or if it had been coopted by the MAS. Abel Mamani, who had led the FEJUVE's campaign against water privatisation, was appointed as Minister of Public Works and tasked with establishing a new state-owned water company. When the provisioning of water in El Alto degraded under his oversight, he was forced to resign. The former FEJUVE leader Julieta Mabel Monje received particular criticism for her role as the Minister of Environment and Water, due to her mismanagement of the return of El Alto's water supply from private to public ownership. FEJUVE had proposed the new public water company be self-managed through participatory democracy, but the local government rejected this proposition. The entry of FEJUVE leaders into the government damaged its status in public opinion.

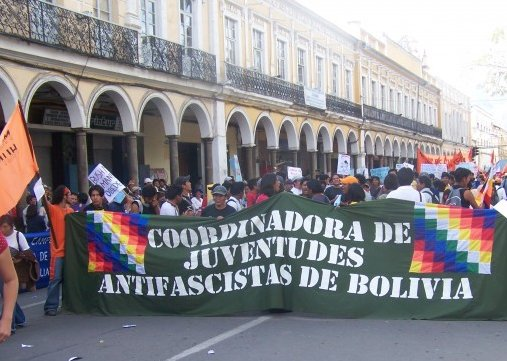
Indigenous protest during the 2008 unrest.

The government further rejected FEJUVE's proposal to elect the Constituent Assembly on a non-partisan basis, with delegates elected from ethnic, trade union and neighborhood lists, rather than from political parties. The MAS succeeded in consolidating power over the popular movements and demobilizing them, with the FEJUVE finding itself "unable to mobilize its bases effectively to advance the cause of the city’s indigenous informal proletarian masses". However, with the outbreak of the 2008 unrest, neighborhood councils in Santa Cruz formed to defend their neighborhoods from the rising right-wing paramilitary violence, inspired directly by the FEJUVE. A coalition of social movements even placed Santa Cruz under siege, with FEJUVE and Morales leading a demonstration on a march to the capital, demanding the National Congress convoke of a constitutional referendum. The new constitution was finally ratified after a number of concessions to the opposition, thus maintaining the influence of agribusiness and keeping power in the hands of political parties. Despite the anti-capitalist and directly democratic elements of the constitution being struck out, its ratification still implemented the state ownership of natural resources and the expansion of indigenous rights.

To mobilize support for the constitution, the FEJUVE came together with other social movements to found the National Coalition for Change (CONAL-CAM), working together with the COB as part of a popular front. The FEJUVE had found itself undergoing a shift from its former confrontational position to a "constructive but critical collaboration" with the MAS government. The FEJUVE's collaboration with the government has since resulted in a new public housing program for El Alto, with the FEJUVE and COB pushing for the integration of participatory planning into the process. The Ministry of Production and Microenterprise has also provided support for El Alto's social enterprises, which are organized along the traditional lines of participatory democracy. This process resulted in the extension of workers' control over the economy, with FEJUVE and COB arguing for the program's expansion to El Alto's smaller businesses. This new model of "Andean capitalism" intended to utilize surplus funds from nationalized resources to promote community self-organization and workers' self-management.

=== Contemporary activities ===
As climate change caused Bolivia's glaciers to melt and weather patterns to change, by 2010, El Alto was facing increasing water scarcity. FEJUVE, which had previously supported the creation of a state-owned water company, began calling for the creation of an autonomous municipal water company for El Alto. State officials in La Paz countered with a proposal for a centralized water company based in El Alto, but the FEJUVE remained suspicious of such plans due to past failures of La Paz to deliver services for EL Alto.

During the 2011 Bolivian Indigenous rights protests, the FEJUVE called a general strike in El Alto, demanding that the state increase funding provided to the city, which had seen a 50% population increase over the previous decade. After two days, during which roads into La Paz were blockaded, Morales presided over negotiations to end the strike, promising new infrastructure projects for the city. Of FEJUVE's 14 district councils, 2 refused to agree to the settlement and momentarily continued their blockades of La Paz.

In October 2013, on the tenth anniversary of the Bolivian gas conflict, the FEJUVE reported that conditions in the city hadn't improved substantially since the election of Evo Morales; according to the FEJUVE, 60% of the city still lacked a proper sewage system and 10% had no running water. Residents felt that the city had been neglected, despite its role as "the vanguard of [Bolivia’s] process of change." The FEJUVE called a 24-hour general strike and for a boycott of government celebrations; it called for further infrastructure projects and increased funding, including a share of the country's nationalized petroleum industry. Morales responded by announcing the construction of a dam to provide water for El Alto and committed $1 billion to infrastructure improvements for the city.

In June 2016, the FEJUVE called a general strike in El Alto, but it only received a minimal turnout.

During the 2026 Bolivian protests, on 2 June 2026, the FEJUVE declared a state of emergency in El Alto and demanded the resignation of president Rodrigo Paz.

== Governance ==
As of 2008, FEJUVE counted 570 neighborhood councils spread throughout El Alto's nine districts. Each council has at least 200 members, which elect their own leadership committees and hold monthly neighborhood assemblies, which make decisions through discussion and consensus. Each council is led by an executive committee consisting of 15 secretariats, less than a third of which are permanent. Each executive committee has a president and a secretary, usually elected by assemblies due to their experience in social networking or their public speaking skills. Political party leaders, merchants, real estate speculators, and those who collaborated with the dictatorship are prohibited from leadership and delegational positions. However, these restrictions haven't always been closely followed, as members of political parties and municipal officials have reportedly taken leadership positions within the FEJUVE.

Council meetings take place in circles, with men on one side and women on the other, which makes women more comfortable speaking. Leadership of the neighborhood councils have a relatively high proportion of women, around 20-30%. The participation of women and young people in council meetings has also reportedly increased during the 21st century. Once every two years, a congress of neighborhood councils is held; representing each council are four delegates, two from the council's leadership and two elected from its grassroots base by an assembly. These biennial congresses elect the central executive committee of the FEJUVE, which counts 29 ministries, as well as a President and Vice-President. Each district of El Alto is represented on the committee, according to proportional representation.

As an alternative to the state's policing and courts system, interpersonal conflicts between neighbors are arbitrated by the neighborhood councils, either by an assembly or by an executive decision. The neighborhood councils also manage education through school councils, which regulate curriculums and oversee teachers' behavior. Bolivian sociologist Álvaro García Linera has described the FEJUVE's governance structure as a "horizontal kind of organizational experience", as local councils largely make decisions autonomously, without mediation from the senior leadership. According to Uruguayan political theorist Raúl Zibechi, the FEJUVE fulfils the functions of the state in El Alto, but "there is no one state; there is a veritable dispersion of authority (at least with respect to territorial control) in some 500 units. The one gives way to the multiple. Therefore, no representation or control of the population is possible." The United States Agency for International Development has considered this dispersion of power and strong community cohesion in El Alto to be a "problem", as it has placed obstacles in the way of state bureaucracy and real estate speculation.

== Economy ==
The informal economy of El Alto is self-managed by the city's workers and small traders. Market vendors are represented by a street merchants' association, which regulates stall access, keeps track of the markets' upkeep and sanitation, mediates inter-vendor disputes and negotiates with the municipal government on the vendors' behalf. These trade union associations also mediate conflicts between street merchants and collect union dues for the regional branch of the Bolivian Workers' Center (COB). Taxi and bus drivers are similarly organized within a trade union, which regulates their routes and allocates their itineraries. El Alto's trade union federation, which has a powerful role in the city's economy, cooperates closely with the FEJUVE on key issues.

Construction and infrastructure projects are headed by the neighborhood councils, which bring together neighbors to gather materials and work collectively in shifts; those that refuse to work on a collective project are issued a symbolic fine of 50 pesos, although these often go uncollected. Bolivian sociologist Félix Patzi has argued that the collective ownership and self-management of the economy by the unions and neighborhood councils brought about a high level of community cohesion in El Alto, without any strict mechanisms for coercion.

== Bibliography ==
- Achtenberg, Emily (2009). "Community Organizing, Rebellion, and the Progressive State: Neighborhood Councils in El Alto, Bolivia". In Fasenfest, David (ed.). Engaging Social Justice: Critical Studies of 21st Century Social Transformation. Studies in Critical Social Sciences. Vol. 13. Leiden: Brill. pp. 275–288. ISBN 978-90-04-17654-6. ISSN 1573-4234. OCLC 7348351162.
- Achtenberg, Emily (19 August 2011). "Bolivia: A Week At the Barricades". NACLA. New York: North American Congress on Latin America. ISSN 0048-0630. OCLC 4901603.
- Achtenberg, Emily (8 November 2013). "Bolivia's Black October, Ten Years Later". NACLA. New York: North American Congress on Latin America. ISSN 0048-0630. OCLC 4901603.
- Fabricant, Nicole; Hicks, Kathryn (29 October 2011). "The Water Is Ours Damn It". ReVista: Harvard Review of Latin America. Cambridge, Massachusetts: Harvard University Press. OCLC 165888583.
- Gelderloos, Peter (2010). "How will cities work?". Anarchy Works. San Francisco: Ardent Press. pp. 123–125. OCLC 748435918.
- McNelly, Angus (2019). "The Highs and Lows of Bolivia's Rebel City: Known as the epicenter of anti-austerity rebellion during Bolivia's Gas War, El Alto remains a powerful example of the potential for local movements to leverage their cities to shape national politics". NACLA Report on the Americas. 51 (4): 333–340. doi:10.1080/10714839.2019.1692942.
- Zibechi, Raúl (2010). Dispersing Power: Social Movements as Anti-State Forces. Translated by Ryan, Ramor. Edinburgh: AK Press. ISBN 978-1-84935-011-2. OCLC 750595367.
