= 2020 Bolivian protests =

- Date: July 26, 2020 – November 14, 2020
- Location: Bolivia
- Caused by: 2019 Bolivian political crisis; Ouster of Evo Morales; Government mishandling of the COVID-19 pandemic
- Goals: Resignation of President Jeanine Áñez; Elections to be held immediately
- Methods: Demonstrations
- Result: Protests suppressed by force; Luis Arce becomes new president of Bolivia, following his victory in the 2020 Bolivian general election

Parties
(Bolivia) Government; Supported by: Brazil	Opposition; Supported by: Argentina

Lead figures
(Bolivia) Jeanine Áñez	Luis Arce

The 2020 Bolivian protests were mass anti-presidential demonstrations and pro-Morales unrest after the 2019 Bolivian political crisis ousted popular president Evo Morales and his government, and made Jeanine Áñez the interim president. Another cause was the delay of the 2020 Bolivian general election.

== Background ==
Bolivia has seen many demonstrations and uprisings since the 1952 Bolivian Revolution and has seen many abuse scandals since the killings of peaceful protesters in the 2011 Bolivian indigenous rights protests. Mass protests in 2019, the 2019 Bolivian protests, were a revolution and mass uprising against president Evo Morales, after the results of the 2019 Bolivian general election were said to be rigged and falsified. Bolivia then ousted him after 13 years in power in the 2019 Bolivian political crisis, which is considered to be a coup. Pro-Morales demonstrations took place for 10 days.

== Protests ==
Protests erupted on 9 August after the election was delayed on 6 August. Mass demonstrators set blockades and looted trees. Protesters marched throughout the indigenous eastern province and started chanting slogans against president Jeanine Áñez.

On 11–13 August, anti-government protests again took place, while no police intervened in the street protests. Strikes were organised for 14–15 August by workers and indigenous tribes but farmer strikes were already taking place, with them burning tires and starting blockades, while others threatened a nationwide strike.

Two weeks of barricades continued throughout the country, marchers chanted and clapped and set fires to branches and broken trees, demanding better treatment of tribes and forest people. On 28 August-28 September, strikes took place and the crisis escalated. On 28 August, thugs stormed the demonstrations and shot at the demonstrators, but no casualties were reported.

== Aftermath ==
General strikes and a series of wildcat strikes have since been ongoing, with chaos even ongoing into September, October and November, when election protests and strikes took place. The 2020 Bolivian general election would be the end of the movement but strikes have continued since.

== See also ==
- 2019 Bolivian protests
- 2020 Bolivian general election
