= San Julián Municipality, Santa Cruz =

Coordinates: 16.9064°S 62.6169°W

San Julián Municipality Municipalidad de San Julián
- Municipality
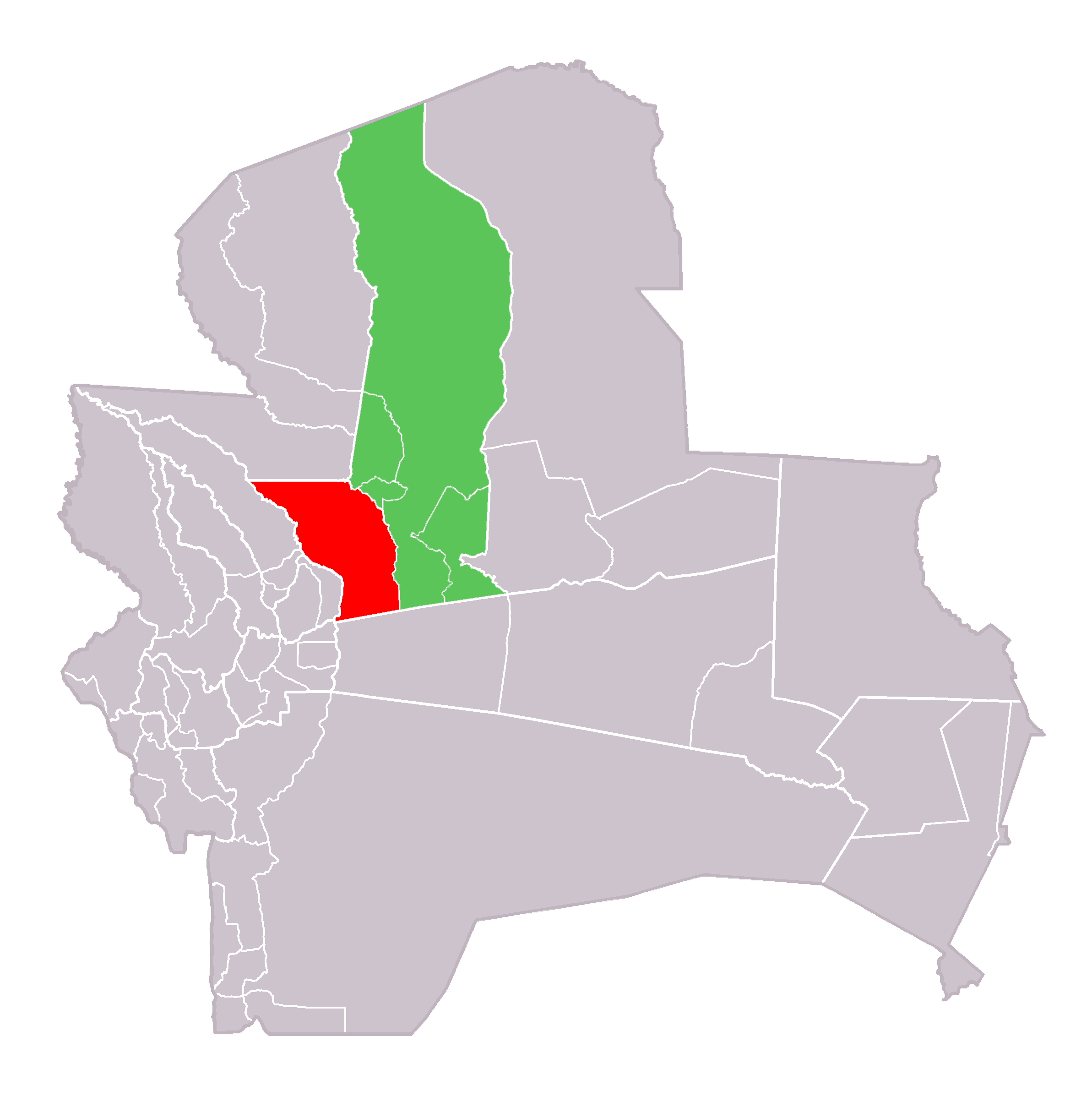
- San Julián Municipality (red) within Ñuflo de Chávez Province (green) and Santa Cruz Department of Bolivia
- Country: Bolivia
- Time zone: UTC-4 (BOT)

San Julián is a city and the fourth municipal section of Ñuflo de Chávez Province in Santa Cruz Department, Bolivia. This municipality is mostly populated by migrants from other regions of Bolivia, and in a lesser amount by local indigenous inhabitants of the Guaraní ethnicity. It's a zone with a high agricultural productivity for soy, sunflower, corn, rice, beans, and sesame based on the quality of its soils.

== General facts ==
Founding: The municipality was founded as the fourth section of Ñuflo de Chávez Province by Law 1091 of February 21, 1989. The city's anniversary is celebrated on June 24.

Political divisions: There are 14 municipal districts.

Geographic location: 170 km northwest of the city of Santa Cruz de la Sierra.

Capital: The town of San Julián with some 25,000 inhabitants as of the 2012 Census.

Other Population Centers and Communities:

- La Asunta: 1400 inhabitants,
- Villa Paraíso: 1200 inhabitants,
- Villa Victoria: 900 inhabitants,
- Illimani N29: 800 inhabitants,
- Berlín Los Troncos: 800 inhabitants,
- El Carmen: 500 inhabitants.

And more than 200 communities make up the municipality.

Climate: warm

Total population total: 47,416 inhabitants

=== Language ===
Spanish	28843	67.75%
Quechua	9523	22.37%
Aymara	407	0.96%
Guaraní	592	1.39%
Other Bolivian indigenous languages	130	0.31%
Foreign languages	1640	3.85%
Non-speakers	108	0.25%
Did not specify	1325	3.11%
Total	42571	
Census data regarding people 5 years or older. Source: Instituto Nacional de Estadística 2012.

== Local government ==
San Julián is an autonomous municipality established under the terms of the 2009 Bolivian constitution. Its Autonomous Municipal Government has two branches, the Executive branch is headed by the Municipal Mayor, elected by popular vote for a term of five years. The current mayor (for 2015–2020) is Faustino C. Flores, of the Movement Towards Socialism party (MAS-IPSP). The legislative branch is formed by a municipal council of seven members elected for the same period.

== Tourist Attractions ==
Several rivers run through San Julián municipality, including the Río Grande or Guapay River, the San Julián River, the Pailas River, the Bolsón River, and the Secacuchial River.

Among its important buildings are the City Hall (Alcaldía), which is a modern building built in the colonial style, and the San Julián Church.
