= 2021 Bolivian doctors' strike =

Labor dispute in Bolivia

The 2021 Bolivian doctors' strike were mass protests and non-violent nation-wide doctor-led protests in Bolivia that started on 29 January in La Paz and spread to the eastern provinces in protest against low oxygen, demands for stricter lockdown in Potosí and demanded better conditions for healthcare workers. They launched their campaign in La Paz, culminating into a strike wave, spreading to Santa Cruz, where police fired tear gas at protesters calling for stricter COVID-19 restrictions amid COVID-19 outbreak in the country and surge in cases despite Healthcare system ‘collapse’. Protesters rallied in large cities, in large numbers and called for the government to step up action. Police responded with tear gas and police brutality, and the government made concessions, sending more material into hospitals and schools. Some nurses took to the streets in 20 February to protest against a new health emergency law. One out of their main three demands was met with the government but the other two demands had failed to reach an agreement.

== See also ==
- 2019 Bolivian protests
