= Red Ponchos =

Bolivian militia

The Red Ponchos seen at a protest in La Paz in May 2026

The Red Ponchos (Spanish: Ponchos Rojos) are a militia mostly containing Aymara reservists of the Bolivian Army in the Andean region of Omasuyos. Their actions keep in mind their original culture, and they use Ayllu organizational forms with a communal structure, a practice that is used in Aymara and Quechua societies. They are estimated to have numbers in the thousands.

== History ==
The Red Ponchos originated from Achacachi, the capital of Omasuyos. The date of the Red Ponchos' founding is uncertain, although they did come to prominence in September 2003, when they fought against the government of Gonzalo Sánchez de Lozada. They fought him again in 2007, when he announced that he would defend the territorial integrity of Bolivia against separatism.

Red Ponchos Eugenio Rojas and Ruperto Quispe warned that the Red Ponchos would march to Sucre on November 25, saying that the Red Ponchos would attack any opposition.

The Red Ponchos were supporters of President Evo Morales when he tried to reform the Constitution of Bolivia in order to make it a multicultural state. In 2013, they protested against the banning of Morales's flight by the French government. In 2016, when Morales was inquiring about whether a renewed presidential campaign would be constitutional or not, the Red Ponchos strongly believed that Morales should have been able to run for President again.

== Bolivian protests of 2019 ==
Due to Evo Morales's Aymara heritage and his forced resignation in the 2019 Bolivian political crisis, Red Ponchos left the city of El Alto in protest on November 11. They called for a civil war that would occur. Their terms, declared on November 18, was that, if figures in the new government would not step down within 24 hours, they would march to La Paz and start a civil war.

== Uniform ==
The Red Ponchos wear red ponchos, for which the movement is named after. It is a "symbol of war" and can also be used as a blanket for sleeping in the open. At the throat is the Chalina, a scarf which holds the ponchos in place and serves as protection for the throat against weather. The Q'urawa, also known as the Honda, is a sling that is two or more meters long and made with llama or sheep wool. Dynamite and stones can be inserted inside an opening in the center. The Red Ponchos also wear the Lluch'u as headwear during training nights. They wear the Ch'uspas, a multicolored bag used for carrying food, drinks, coca leaves, and various other things, as well as the Whiska, a flexible rope of various colors in criss-crossing lines, which is used to tie and suspend weights. It can also be used as a blunt weapon.
