= 2025 in Bolivia =

- Decades: 2000s; 2010s; 2020s
- See also: Other events of 2025; History of Bolivia • Years

The following is a chronology of notable events from the year 2025 in Bolivia.

== Incumbents ==
=== National government ===
- President: Luis Arce (MAS, until 8 November); Rodrigo Paz (PDC, since 8 November)
- Vice President: David Choquehuanca (MAS, until 8 November); Edmand Lara (PDC, since 8 November)
- President of the Supreme Tribunal of Justice: Ricardo Torres
- President of the Supreme Electoral Tribunal: Oscar Hassenteufel
- President of the Plurinational Constitutional Tribunal: Paul Franco
- President of the Senate: Andrónico Rodríguez (MAS, until 6 November); Diego Ávila (since 6 November)
- President of the Chamber of Deputies: Omar Yujra (MAS, until 6 November); Roberto Castro Salazar (since 6 November)
- Assembly: 3rd (until 6 November); 4th (since 6 November)

== Events ==
=== January ===
- 17 January – A court in Tarija orders the arrest of former president Evo Morales for the statutory rape of a 16-year old girl in 2016.
- 26 January – A bus overturns in Potosi Department, killing 19 people and injuring nine others.

=== February ===
- 17 February – A bus falls into a precipice in Yocalla Municipality, killing 31 people and injuring 14 others.
- 24 February – The Mutun steel plant megaproject is inaugurated in Puerto Suarez.

=== March ===
- 1 March – Two buses collide near Uyuni, killing 37 people and injuring 39 others.
- 3 March – A bus is hit by a truck and falls off a ravine in Lenas, Potosí Department, killing 31 people and injuring 22 others.
- 12 March – A bus crashes into a rock and veers off a road in Potosí Department, killing 13 people and injuring 20 others.
- 26 March – A nationwide state of emergency is declared by President Luis Arce due to floods that have left 51 people dead since November 2024 and affected 380,000 families.

=== April ===
- 3 April – Five people are killed in an explosion that occurs between a dispute among groups of gold miners at the Yani mine near Sorata.
- 10 April – Gazprom withdraws from the Azero gas exploration project in the Chuquisaca and Santa Cruz Departments due to failure to find viable natural gas deposits.

=== May ===
- 3 May – Andrónico Rodríguez officially announces his candidacy for the Presidency of Bolivia for the Popular Alliance.
- 14 May – President Luis Arce announces his withdrawal from seeking a second presidential term in the 2025 Bolivian general election.
- 16 May – Marcos Roberto de Almeida, a leader of the Brazilian criminal group Primeiro Comando da Capital, is arrested in Santa Cruz de la Sierra.

=== June ===
- 12 June – Five people are killed nationwide during protests by supporters of Evo Morales.

=== August ===
- 6 August – Bicentennial of Bolivia
- 17 August – 2025 Bolivian general election (first round): No candidate wins a majority in the presidential election, with right-wing candidates Senator Rodrigo Paz Pereira and former president Jorge Quiroga entering into a runoff.
- 25 August – A judge orders the annulment of the trial of former president Jeanine Añez for the killing of demonstrators during the 2019 Bolivian protests, saying that she is entitled to a special judicial process for former heads of state handled by the Plurinational Legislative Assembly rather than the regular courts.
- 26 August – A judge orders the release of opposition politicians Luis Fernando Camacho and Marco Antonio Pumari, who were imprisoned since 2021 on charges of sedition against the government of Evo Morales in the 2019 Bolivian general election.

=== September ===
- 2 September – Catholic Church sexual abuse cases: A court sentences two Spanish Jesuit priests to one year imprisonment for covering up 85 cases of child sex abuse by a deceased colleague from 1972 to 2000, in Bolivia’s first successful criminal prosecution against high-ranking Jesuits implicated in concealing abuse cases.
- 3 September – The United States deports former interior minister Arturo Murillo to Bolivia, where he is wanted on multiple charges including illegally importing weapons to crimes against humanity for overseeing the crackdown on the 2019 Bolivian protests. He is placed under arrest upon arrival in Santa Cruz Department the next day and transported to La Paz.

=== October ===
- 19 October – 2025 Bolivian general election (second round): Rodrigo Paz Pereira is elected president with 54.5% of the vote.

=== November ===
- 5 November – The Supreme Tribunal of Justice overturns the conviction of former president Jeanine Añez for the ouster of his predecessor, Evo Morales, in 2019.
- 8 November – Rodrigo Paz Pereira is inaugurated as president.

=== December ===
- 1 December – Bolivia grants visa-free entry for up to 90 days for citizens of the United States, Israel, South Korea and South Africa.
- 9 December – Bolivia restores diplomatic relations with Israel for the first time since 2023.
- 10 December – Former president Luis Arce is arrested as part of a corruption investigation involving his tenure as economy minister during the presidency of Evo Morales.
- 19 December – A strike is held by public transportation workers in La Paz and Santa Cruz de la Sierra in protest against the government's order to increase fuel prices by 100%.
- 23 December – President Paz signs a decree lifting restrictions on international satellite companies imposed by the Arce administration.

== Arts and entertainment ==
- List of Bolivian submissions for the Academy Award for Best International Feature Film

== Holidays ==
- 1 January – New Year holidays
- 22 January – Plurinational State Day
- 3–4 March – Carnival
- 18 April – Good Friday
- 1 May – Labour Day
- 19 June – Corpus Christi
- 21 June – Aymara New Year
- 6 August – National Day
- 2 November – All Souls' Day
- 25 December – Christmas Day

== Deaths ==
- 26 May: Alberto Luis Aguilar, 74, politician, deputy (2002–2006).
- 26 June: Ocasional Talento, 29, rapper.
- 1 September: Percy Fernández, 86, engineer and politician, mayor of Santa Cruz de la Sierra (1990–1995, 2005–2020) and senator (1989).
