= 2027 in Bolivia =

- Decades: 2000s; 2010s; 2020s
- See also: Other events of 2027; History of Bolivia • Years

Events in the year 2027 in Bolivia.

== Incumbents ==
- President: Rodrigo Paz
- Vice President: Edmand Lara
- President of the Supreme Tribunal of Justice: Romer Saucedo
- President of the Supreme Electoral Tribunal: Gustavo Ávila
- President of the Plurinational Constitutional Tribunal: Paola Verónica Prudencio Candia
- President of the Senate: Diego Ávila
- President of the Chamber of Deputies: Roberto Castro Salazar
- Assembly: 4th Plurinational Legislative Assembly of Bolivia

== Events ==
=== Predicted and scheduled ===
- 20 November – 2027 Copa Sudamericana final in Santa Cruz de la Sierra

== Holidays ==
- 1 January – New Year's Day
- 22 January – Plurinational State Day
- 8-9 February – Carnival
- 26 March – Good Friday
- 1 May – Labour Day
- 27 May – Corpus Christi
- 21 June – Aymara New Year
- 6 August – National Day
- 2 November – All Souls' Day
- 25 December – Christmas Day
