= 2026 in Bolivia =

- Decades: 2000s; 2010s; 2020s
- See also: Other events of 2026; History of Bolivia • Years

Events in the year 2026 in Bolivia.

== Incumbents ==
- President: Rodrigo Paz
- Vice President: Edmand Lara
- President of the Supreme Tribunal of Justice: Romer Saucedo
- President of the Supreme Electoral Tribunal: Gustavo Ávila
- President of the Plurinational Constitutional Tribunal: Paola Verónica Prudencio Candia
- President of the Senate: Diego Ávila
- President of the Chamber of Deputies: Roberto Castro Salazar
- Assembly: 4th Plurinational Legislative Assembly of Bolivia

== Events ==
=== January ===
- 9 January – Mauricio Aramayo, an aide to president Paz, is shot dead in Tarija.
- 12 January – A bus crashes in Santa Cruz Department, killing 11 people and injuring three others.

=== February ===
- 2 February – A nationwide ban on the usage of cellphones in classrooms comes into effect.
- 6–22 February – Bolivia at the 2026 Winter Olympics
- 8 February – A bus falls down a 100 m (330 ft) ravine in Eliodoro Camacho Province, killing 10 people.
- 27 February – A C-130 Hercules aircraft of the Bolivian Air Force overshoots the runway while landing at El Alto International Airport near La Paz and collides with several vehicles, killing at least 22 people and injuring 29 others.

=== March ===
- 13 March – Authorities arrest suspected Uruguayan drug cartel leader Sebastián Marset during a police operation in Santa Cruz de la Sierra. Marset, who is wanted by several countries and has a US$2 million reward linked to money laundering allegations, is detained along with four other individuals.
- 22 March – 2026 Bolivian regional elections (first round)

=== April ===
- 14 April – A bus plunges into a ravine in Apolo, La Paz, killing six people and injuring 14 others.
- 19 April – 2026 Bolivian regional elections (second round)
- 29 April – A bus overturns near Oruro, killing nine people and injuring 22 others.

=== May ===
- 13 May – President Paz repeals a law allowing for the mortgaging of land amid widespread protests.
- 23 May – Public works minister Mauricio Zamora survives two separate ambushes on his vehicle by protesters in Copata.

=== June ===
- 8 June – President Paz signs a law easing the government's ability to declare a state of emergency.
- 20 June – President Paz declares a state of emergency in response to nationwide antigovernment protests and road blockades.
- 21 June – A light aircraft of the Bolivian Air Force crashes during aerial patrols over a blockaded highway between La Paz and Cochabamba, killing six officers.

=== September ===
- 4 September – Nine people are killed in a fireworks explosion at a military base in Viacha.
- 19 September – A $1.9 billion IMF loan is approved by the Plurinational Legislative Assembly.

=== October ===
- 31 October – President Paz declares a nationwide state of emergency due to damages caused by El Niño.

== Arts and entertainment ==
- List of Bolivian submissions for the Academy Award for Best International Feature Film

== Holidays ==
- 1 January – New Year's Day
- 22 January – Plurinational State Day
- 16-17 February – Carnival
- 3 April – Good Friday
- 1 May – Labour Day
- 4 June – Corpus Christi
- 21 June – Aymara New Year
- 6 Augusy – National Day
- 2 November – All Souls' Day
- 25 December – Christmas Day

== Deaths ==
- 8 March – Arturo López, 90, footballer (national team).
- 30 May – París Galán, 58, drag queen and politician.
- 24 September – Ricardo Ernesto Centellas Guzmán, 63, Roman Catholic prelate, auxiliary bishop (2005–2009) and bishop (2009–2020) of Potosí and archbishop of Sucre (since 2020).
