= 2024 in Bolivia =

- Decades: 2000s; 2010s; 2020s
- See also: Other events of 2024; History of Bolivia • Years

The following is a chronology of notable events from the year 2024 in Bolivia.

== Incumbents ==
=== National government ===
- President: Luis Arce (MAS)
- Vice President: David Choquehuanca (MAS)
- President of the Supreme Tribunal of Justice: Ricardo Torres
- President of the Supreme Electoral Tribunal: Oscar Hassenteufel
- President of the Plurinational Constitutional Tribunal: Paul Franco
- President of the Senate: Andrónico Rodríguez (MAS)
- President of the Chamber of Deputies: Jerges Mercado (PCB)
- Assembly: 3rd

== Events ==
=== March ===
- March 23 – Bolivian census of 2024

=== June ===
- June 26 – 2024 Bolivian coup attempt: President Luis Arce accuses Bolivian Army commanding general Juan José Zúñiga of plotting a coup and calls for a general strike and blocking of roads to prevent it, leading to its failure and Zúñiga’s arrest later that day.

=== July ===
- July 1 – Bolivia summons its ambassador to Argentina after the latter’s president, Javier Milei calls the recent 2024 Bolivian coup attempt "fraudulent" and implies that it was staged.
- July 15 – President Arce announces the discovery of natural gas reserves with an estimated volume of 1.7 trillion cubic meters at the Mayaya X-1 field north of La Paz.
- July 21 – A bus heading to Chile collides head-on with a truck on a highway between Patacamaya and the Chilean town of Tambo Quemado, killing at least 22 people and injuring 16 others.

=== September ===
- September 17 – The March to Save Bolivia, a weeklong nationwide anti-government protest called on by former president Evo Morales, begins. At least 34 people are subsequently injured in clashes during the event.

=== October ===
- 8 October – South Africa's genocide case against Israel: Bolivia intervenes in the genocide case on the side of South Africa.
- 27 October – Former president Evo Morales claims that he had survived an assassination attempt against him near a military garrison in Villa Tunari following a gun attack on his vehicle that injured his driver.

=== November ===
- 1 November –
  - Three military garrisons are seized by Evo Morales supporters in Chapare Province.
  - Evo Morales begins a hunger strike demanding that the Arce government engage in dialogue.
- 8 November – The Plurinational Constitutional Tribunal bars Evo Morales from running again for president in the 2025 Bolivian general election, citing his already exceeding the two-term limit.
- 27 November – The Supreme Tribunal of Justice of Bolivia allows the extradition of former anti-narcotics agency head Maximiliano Dávila-Perez to the United States, where he is indicted on cocaine smuggling and possession of machine guns. His extradition is finalized on 12 December.

=== December ===
- 15 December – 2024 Bolivian judicial election.
- 16 December – An arrest warrant is issued against Evo Morales on charges of "trafficking" a 15-year old girl when he was president.

== Arts and entertainment ==
- List of Bolivian submissions for the Academy Award for Best International Feature Film

== Holidays ==
- 1 January – New Year holidays
- 22 January – Plurinational State Day
- 12–13 February – Carnival
- 29 March – Good Friday
- 1 May – Labour Day
- 30 May – Corpus Christi
- 21 June – Aymara New Year
- 6 August – National Day
- 2 November – All Souls' Day
- 25 December – Christmas Day
