= History of Bolivia (1982–present) =

The history of Bolivia since 1982 begins with the restorations of democracy after the rule of the military junta of 1982. Evo Morales held the presidency from 2006 to 2019. A new constitution was enacted in 2009. Bolivia's population has roughly doubled over this period, from 5 million in 1980 to 10 million as of 2012.

== Hernán Siles Zuaso (1982–85) ==
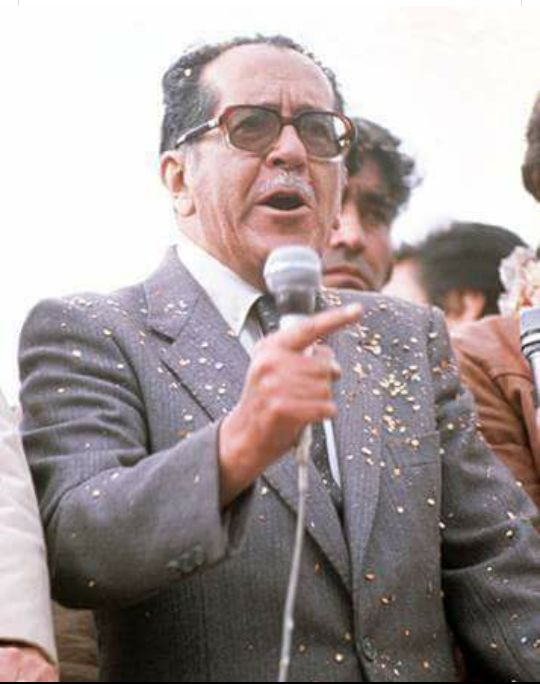
Hernán Siles Zuazo in October 1982

The former president Hernán Siles Zuazo assumed the presidency of Bolivia on 10 October 1982, following a general strike that brought the country close to civil war. Severe social tension, exacerbated by economic mismanagement and weak leadership, forced Siles Zuaso to call early elections and relinquish power a year before the end of his constitutional term.

== Víctor Paz Estenssoro (1985–1989) ==
In the 1985 elections, the Nationalist Democratic Action (ADN) of General (and former dictator) Hugo Banzer Suárez won a plurality of the popular vote, followed by former President Víctor Paz Estenssoro's Nationalist Revolutionary Movement (MNR) and former Vice President Jaime Paz Zamora's Revolutionary Left Movement (MIR). But in the second round of voting by congress, the MIR sided with the MNR, and Paz Estenssoro was chosen for a fourth term as President.

When Estenssoro took office in 1985, he faced a staggering economic crisis. Economic output and exports had been declining for several years. Hyperinflation had reached an annual rate of 24%. Social unrest, chronic strikes, and unchecked drug trafficking were widespread. In 4 years, Paz Estenssoro's administration achieved economic and social stability. The military stayed out of politics, and all major political parties publicly and institutionally committed themselves to democracy. Human rights violations, which badly tainted some governments earlier in the decade, were no longer a problem. However, Estenssoro's remarkable accomplishments were not won without sacrifice. The collapse of tin prices in October 1985, coming just as the government was moving to reassert its control of the mismanaged state mining enterprise, forced the government to lay off over 20,000 miners.

Under pressure from the United States to control coca production, Bolivia passed Law 1008 to enable eradication. Protests by coca growers in Chapare against the proposed law were met by the Villa Tunari massacre in which 12 farmers were killed.

== Jaime Paz Zamora (1989–1993) ==
In the 1989 elections, Jaime Paz Zamora agreed to Patriotic Accord coalition between his MIR party and their former enemy, Gen. Hugo Banzer's ADN. Paz Zamora assumed the presidency, and the MIR took half the ministries, while Banzer's party took control of the National Political Council (CONAPOL) and the other ministries. Banzer was promised the presidency if the alliance was successful in the following election.

Two days after taking power, the government implemented Supreme Decree 21060 (followed by DS 21660), known as the ‘New Economic Policy’, which included reforms for monetary and fiscal stabilisation, the unification of the exchange rate system, tax reform, trade liberalisation, and freezes on wages. These packages were supported with lines of credit arranged by the World Bank and International Monetary Fund.

Paz Zamora was a moderate, center-left President whose political pragmatism in office outweighed his Marxist origins. Having seen the destructive hyperinflation of the Siles Zuazo administration, he continued the neoliberal economic reforms begun by Paz Estenssoro, codifying some of them. The president took a fairly hard line against domestic terrorism, personally ordering the December 1990 attack on terrorists of the Néstor Paz Zamora Commission, named for his brother.

Paz Zamora was less decisive against narcotics trafficking. The government broke up a number of trafficking networks but issued a 1991 surrender decree giving lenient sentences to the biggest narcotics kingpins. Also, his administration was extremely reluctant to pursue coca eradication. It did not agree to an updated extradition treaty with the US, although two traffickers have been extradited to the U.S. since 1992. Beginning in early 1994, the Bolivian Congress investigated Paz Zamora's personal ties to accused major trafficker Isaac Chavarria, who subsequently died in prison while awaiting trial. MIR deputy chief Oscar Eid was jailed in connection with similar ties in 1994; he was found guilty and sentenced to 4 years in prison in November 1996. Technically still under investigation, Paz Zamora became an active presidential candidate in 1996.

== Gonzalo Sánchez de Lozada (1993–1997) ==
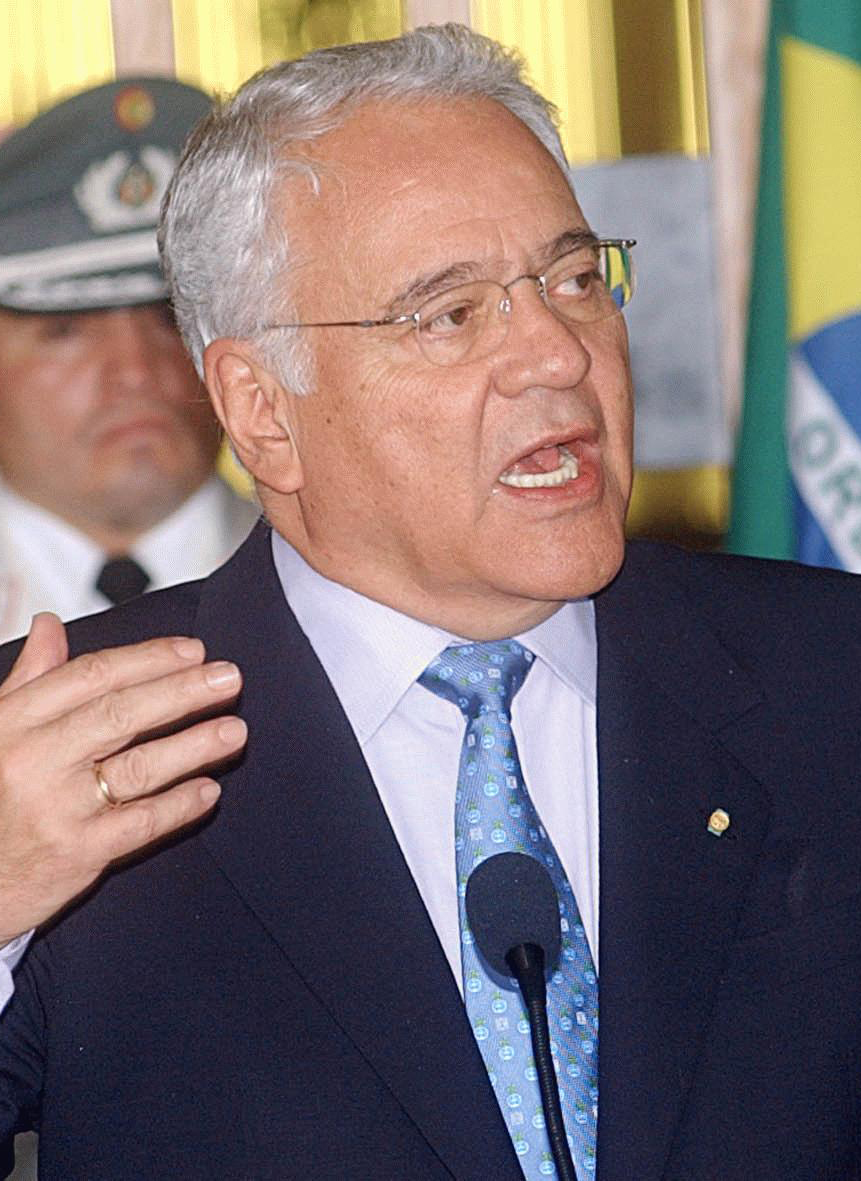
Gonzalo Sánchez de Lozada

The 1993 elections continued the tradition of open, honest elections and peaceful democratic transitions of power. An alliance between the Revolutionary Nationalist Movement (MNR) and the Revolutionary Liberation Movement Tupaq Katari (MRTKL) defeated the Patriotic Accord coalition, and the MNR's Sánchez de Lozada was selected as president. The MRTKL's Víctor Hugo Cárdenas became the first Indigenous person elected vice-president in South America.

Sánchez de Lozada pursued an aggressive economic and social reform agenda. The most dramatic change undertaken by the Sanchez de Lozada government was the capitalization program, under which investors acquired 50% ownership and management control of public enterprises, such as the Yacimientos Petrolíferos Fiscales Bolivianos (YPFB) oil corporation, telecommunications system, electric utilities, and others. The reforms and economic restructuring were strongly opposed by certain segments of society, which instigated frequent social disturbances, particularly in La Paz and the Chapare coca-growing region, from 1994 through 1996.

The Sánchez de Lozada presidency also twice amended the Bolivian Constitution of 1967, defining Bolivia as a multi-ethnic and multi-cultural nation, and some Indigenous rights were legally recognized.

== Hugo Banzer Suárez (1997–2001) and Jorge Quiroga Ramírez (2001–2002) ==
In the 1997 elections, the ADN formed a coalition of the MIR, UCS, and CONDEPA parties. As a result, the ADN's leader, former dictator Hugo Banzer, returned to power at age 71 as a democratically elected leader.

Between January and April 2000, a series of anti-privatization protests took place in Cochabamba against the privatization of the municipal water supply that was being pushed through on the recommendation of the World Bank and the International Monetary Fund. The Bolivian government declared martial law, killing several people, arresting protest leaders and shutting down radio stations. After continued disturbances and civic pressure, the government finally rolled back the privatization on April 10, 2000.

After a lung cancer diagnosis, Banzer resigned in August 2001, and was succeeded by his vice-president Jorge Quiroga.

== MNR Presidencies (2002–2005) ==
In the 2002 elections, Sánchez de Lozada ran again, and narrowly beat NFR's Manfred Reyes Villa and the indigenous leader Evo Morales of the Movement Toward Socialism (MAS) party.

Several days before Bolivians went to the voting booths, the U.S. ambassador Manuel Rocha warned the Bolivian electorate that if they voted for a candidate known to have links with drug-trafficking, referring indirectly to Morales, the US would cut off foreign aid and close its markets to the country. Because of the public outrage this statement generated, Morales received nearly 21% of the vote, putting him only a couple points behind Sánchez de Lozada.

During this period, a divisive conflict known as the Bolivian Gas War began as a dispute over the exploitation of Bolivia's large natural gas reserves in the south of the country. Strikes and blockades first erupted in September 2003, with several deaths and dozens of injuries in confrontations with the armed forces. President Sánchez de Lozada resigned under pressure from protesters, formally handing over the presidency to his vice-president, Carlos Mesa, in order to preserve the Constitutional order.

Mesa was inaugurated and promised to address the demands of the protesting majority. In the face of mounting protests, he resigned on March 7, 2005, claiming he was unable to continue governing the country. With promises of support, he withdrew his resignation.

In May–June 2005, Mesa again tendered his resignation and in a hastily convened session of the Parliament in Sucre. Eduardo Rodríguez Veltzé, the President of the Supreme Court, became president on the night of June 9, 2005. Political agreements were reached to modify the Constitution, and allow the full renewal of Parliament, simultaneously with a new presidential election in December.

== Evo Morales (2006–2019) ==
The deterioration of the Bolivian political system contributed towards the rise of a loose confederation of indigenous social movements, the MAS and other parties, with the head of the MAS Evo Morales, a former cocalero, as leader. In the elections of December 2005, Evo Morales and MAS obtained a comfortable victory, winning 54% of the electorate's votes; Morales was the first indigenous Bolivian president in history.

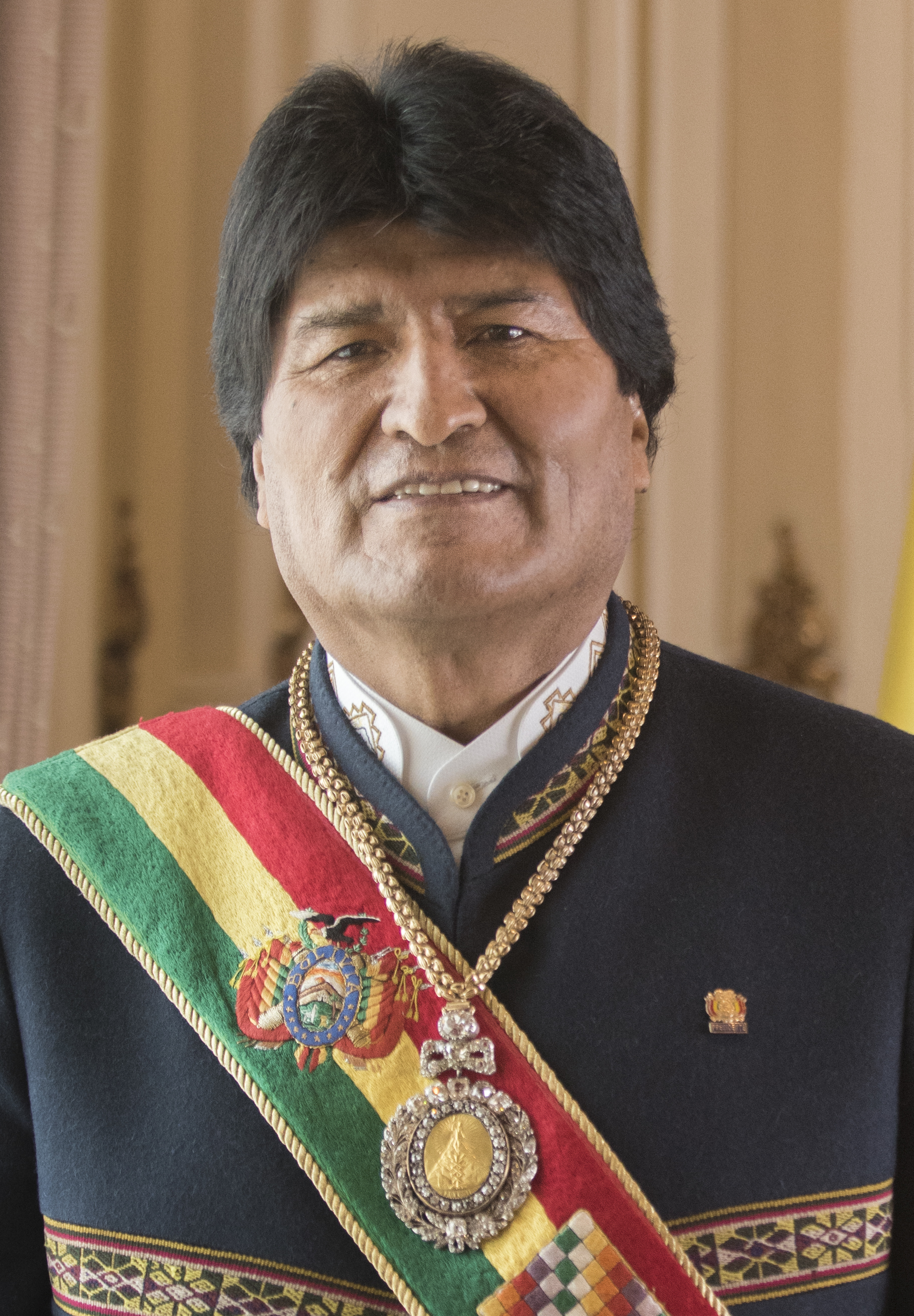
Evo Morales

In March 2006 Morales announced the increase of the minimum wage by 50%. However, 60 percent of Bolivian workers are part of the informal economy, thus limiting the extent of such a legally mandated increase in wages.

On May 1, 2006, Evo Morales nationalized most of Bolivia's natural gas fields, which many indigenous Bolivians had demanded for years. Troops were sent in to occupy the gas fields and take back control from foreign companies that day. Many fields were operated by Petrobras, Brazil's largest energy company, and this political development was expected to strain relations between Morales and leftist Brazilian president Luiz Inácio Lula da Silva. On October 29, 2006 the Morales government signed agreements with eight foreign gas firms including Petrobras, to give the Bolivian national gas company a majority stake in the gas fields, bringing the nationalization to completion.

On May 4, 2008 autonomy referendums were held in four eastern departments, in which they declared themselves autonomous from the central government. All four referendums passed. Evo Morales deemed this referendum illegal. Turnout was at 70%.

In February 2009 a new constitution was enacted by Evo Morales. This gave Bolivians of indigenous descent more economic and political rights.

Morales won a third term in 2014, becoming the longest-serving president in Bolivian history. In 2016, he proposed a constitutional amendment in order to let him run for a fourth term, but it was narrowly defeated in a referendum. However, the Constitutional Court ruled that term limits contravened the American Convention on Human Rights, thus allowing Morales to run for a fourth term. In 2019, Morales claimed victory in the first round of the presidential election, but was forced to step down after allegations of election irregularities resulted in nationwide protests. He was succeeded by Jeanine Áñez, an opposition lawmaker. New elections, which were originally scheduled to occur in May 2020, were postponed to October, due to the COVID-19 pandemic. Luis Arce, a longtime minister in Morales' government, defeated former president Carlos Mesa in a landslide, ending Morales' exile.

== Luis Arce administration (2020–2025) ==
On 8 November 2020, Luis Arce was sworn in as President of Bolivia alongside his Vice President David Choquehuanca. On 12 March 2021 the government ordered the arrest of Jeanine Áñez, the former Interim President, and five members of her government for terrorism, sedition, and conspiracy. According to the prosecutors, she and the ministers took part in a coup against Morales in 2019. According to the Bolivian Institute of Foreign Trade, Bolivia had the lowest accumulated inflation of Latin America by October 2021. There was a deep internal division within the ruling party MAS-IPSP (the Movement towards Socialism – Instrument for the Sovereignty of the People) between the supporters of president Luis Arce and former president Morales. In November 2024, Bolivia’s constitutional court prohibited Evo Morales from running for president in next year’s presidential election. In December 2024 Bolivia extradited its former anti-drugs director Maximiliano Dávila to the United States to face drug trafficking charges. In February 2025, Evo Morales presented his formal resignation from the ruling Movement Towards Socialism (MAS). He was running for president in the Aug. 17 elections with the Front for Victory (FPV). In May 2025, President Luis Arce announced that he would not seek re-election. In May 2025, Bolivia’s top electoral tribunal also disqualified Evo Morales from running in the presidential election.

In October 2025, Rodrigo Paz of the centre-right Christian Democratic Party (PDC) won the run-off race of the election against right-wing former president Jorge Quiroga, meaning the end of governance by the Movement for Socialism (MAS) party and a clear political shift to the right.

On 6 November 2025, former interim president Jeanine Áñez was freed from prison after almost five years, following supreme court ruling that overturned her 10-year prison sentence.

== Rodrigo Paz administration (2025–present) ==
On 8 November 2025, Rodrigo Paz was sworn in as Bolivia’s new president during Bolivia's worst economic crisis in 40 years.

In December 2025, Bolivia's former president Luis Arce was arrested as a part of corruption allegations.

Bolivian relations with the United States improved significantly under president Rodrigo Paz. Bolivia joined the "Shield of the Americas", the US-led security initiative in the Western Hemisphere. In March 2016, Paz participated the inaugural "Shield of the Americas" summit in Florida.

== See also ==
- Bolivian War of Independence
