= 2022 in Bolivia =

- Decades: 2000s; 2010s; 2020s
- See also: Other events of 2022; History of Bolivia • Years

Events from the year 2022 in Bolivia.

== Incumbents ==
=== National government ===
- President: Luis Arce (MAS-IPSP)
- Vice President: David Choquehuanca (MAS-IPSP)
- President of the Chamber of Senators: Andrónico Rodríguez (MAS-IPSP)
- President of the Chamber of Deputies: Freddy Mamani Laura (MAS-IPSP)
- Assembly: 3rd

Governors
- Governor of Beni: Alejandro Unzueta (Third System Movement)
- Governor of Chuquisaca: Damián Condori (We are all Chuquisaca)
- Governor of Cochabamba: Humberto Sánchez (Movement for Socialism)
- Governor of La Paz: Santos Quispe (Forward United People)
- Governor of Oruro: Johnny Vedia (Movement for Socialism)
- Governor of Pando: Regis Richter (Third System Movement)
- Governor of Potosí: Jhonny Mamani (Movement for Socialism)
- Governor of Santa Cruz: Luis Fernando Camacho (Creemos)
- Governor of Tarija: Oscar Montes (United for Change)

== Ongoing events ==
- COVID-19 pandemic in Bolivia (2020–present)

== Events ==
=== January ===
- 1 January – COVID-19 pandemic: A national requirement for either a COVID-19 vaccine card or a negative PCR test when entering public institutions, supermarkets, banks, churches, universities, and for recruitment in the Army enters into force.
- 5 January – COVID-19 pandemic: The vaccine card requirement is suspended until 26 January amid demonstrations from anti-vaccine groups.
- 6 January – The Unified Syndical Confederation of Rural Workers of Bolivia (CSUTCB) censures seven government ministers and three vice ministers and demands changes in the Cabinet of Luis Arce.
- 13 January – Former government and defense ministers Arturo Murillo and Luis Fernando López are formally charged with improper use of influence and contracts harmful to the State, among others.
- 19 January
  - After a meeting with the Pact of Unity, it is agreed that no change to the cabinet will occur on 22 or 23 January, as was the precedent in previous governments.
  - COVID-19 pandemic: The vaccine card requirement is permanently suspended for the duration of the health emergency.
- 22 January – Colonel Maximiliano Dávila, former national director of the Special Force to Fight Drug Trafficking (FELCN), is apprehended in Villazón for links to drug trafficking and legitimization of illicit profits.
- 24 January
  - Police find the buried bodies of two teenage victims of Richard Choque, the so-called "sexual psychopath" investigated for the rape of seventy-seven women.
  - The Prosecutor's Office orders the arrest of former La Paz mayor Luis Revilla in order to secure his presence to testify for the alleged irregular purchase of public transport buses.
- 28 January – The Prosecutor's Office arrests Magistrate Rafael Alcón for illegally granting an early release to Choque despite a thirty-year sentence from 2013.
- 29 January – Revilla declares himself in hiding with intelligence information indicating his presence in Brazil.

=== February ===
- 1 February
  - President Arce creates a special commission to investigate cases in which those sentenced for rape were released.
  - Chile beats Bolivia 3-2 at a football match in La Paz, disqualifying it from participating in the final tournament of the FIFA World Cup.
  - The school year begins, with distance learning imposed on all nine departmental capitals and the ability for rural sectors to opt for face-to-face or blended learning.
- 2 February – La Paz Governor Santos Quispe is arrested after being discovered consuming alcoholic beverages in his office.
- 3 February –The Prosecutor's Office charges Quispe with crimes of improper use of public property and obstruction of justice and he is released on house arrest.
- 9 February – Imprisoned former president Jeanine Áñez begins a hunger strike.
- 10 February
  - The virtual trial of Jeanine Áñez is initiated but postponed.
  - Hilarión Padilla, alternate senator for La Paz, is arrested in Oruro on charges of rape against a young woman.
- 11 February – The Pact of Unity agrees to allow Arce to keep his cabinet, subject to "permanent evaluations" on a monthly basis.
- 15 February – Diego García-Sayán, United Nations special rapporteur on the independence of judges and lawyers, arrives in Bolivia to assess the country's judicial independence.
- 22 February
  - Upon completing his review, García-Sayán highlights that the judicial system "is far from the people" and calls for urgent judicial reform.
  - The Tenth Criminal Investigation Court extends Áñez's term in preventative detention by three months.
- 24 February – Áñez lifts her hunger strike after fifteen days.

=== March ===
- 2 March – Bolivia abstains from voting on a United Nations resolution condemning Russia for its invasion of Ukraine.
- 8 March – The Confederation of Urban Education Workers of Bolivia (CTEUB) initiates a series of strikes demanding a higher education budget, among other proposals.
- 9 March – A legislative session to call for the election of a new ombudsman is suspended after disputes between parliamentarians erupts into physical fights.
- 15 March – The Legislative Assembly reconvenes and unanimously approves the amended draft regulations for the election of an ombudsman.
- 16 March
  - Alternate Deputy Rolando Cuellar is expelled from the Movement for Socialism.
  - Striking teachers clash with law enforcement as they attempt to force their way into the Ministry of Education headquarters.
- 17 March
  - The Plurinational Constitutional Court rules that former president Evo Morales was unjustly disqualified as a candidate for Senate in the 2020 general election and orders financial compensation for damages rendered.
  - The Plurinational Constitutional Court declares the crime of sedition unconstitutional, eliminating it from the Code of Criminal Procedure.
- 18 March
  - The Ministry of Education and the CTEUB announce an agreement; ongoing teachers' strikes are brought to an end.
  - The Trade Union Confederation of Intercultural Women of Bolivia (CSMCIB) expels its executive, Angélica Ponce, for "inducing confrontation" after she accused former president Morales of excluding women from the Movement for Socialism.
  - The Mixed Legislative Commission of the Constitution begins receiving applications for the position of ombudsman of Bolivia.
- 21 March
  - Through an official statement, the Arce administration ratifies its support for the "indisputable leadership" of Morales over the MAS.
  - A judge issues an arrest warrant against Rafael Quispe for the crimes of defamation, slander, and insult relating to case filed by Vice Minister of Justice César Siles.
- 22 March
  - A government delegation led by ministers Néstor Huanca and Edgar Montaño are detained near Guaqui for several hours by protesters demanding the construction of the Río Seco-Desaguadero two-lane expressway.
  - After five days without applicants, Ramiro Sanjinés becomes the first individual to register his candidacy for the position of ombudsman.
- 23 March
  - The Tenth Criminal Court declares former minister of communication Roxana Lizárraga in rebellion and a trial for her role in the delivery of "anti-riot elements" is opened in absentia.
  - The MAS caucus in the Legislative Assembly votes to commence an interpellation of Minister of Government Eduardo del Castillo due to his assertions regarding corruption among some deputies.
  - In his address commemorating Día del Mar, President Arce affirms that the reestablishment of diplomatic relations can only occur within the framework of a solution to their shared maritime dispute.
- 24 March – Bolivia abstains from voting on a United Nations resolution demanding the immediate cessation of hostilities between Russia and Ukraine.
- 25 March
  - Bolivia abstains from voting on an Organization of American States resolution calling for the cessation of acts that may constitute war crimes in the Russian invasion of Ukraine.
  - Businessman Samuel Doria Medina inaugurates the Green Tower, the tallest building in La Paz.
- 26 March – Gladis Pozo becomes the first woman to register her application as a candidate for ombudsman.
- 28 March – The virtual trial of Jeanine Áñez is reinitiated but postponed.
- 31 March – The MAS opens a process to remove Deputy Rolando Cuellar from his seat in the Chamber of Deputies.

=== April ===
- 1 April
  - Incumbent acting ombudsman Nadia Cruz registers her candidacy for a full term as ombudsman.
  - The deadline for receiving applications for the position of ombudsman closes with 198 total applicants.
  - Two supreme decrees issued during the Áñez government promoting members of the armed forces are declared unconstitutional by the Plurinational Constitutional Court due to their lack of ratification by the Senate.
- 4 April
  - The virtual trial of Jeanine Áñez is reinitiated without further postponements. The National Press Association denounces that media outlets were barred from witnessing the proceedings.
  - COVID-19 pandemic: The Bolivian Medical Association agrees to suspend its strike and begins dialogue with the government.
- 6 April – The Mixed Legislative Commission of the Constitution concludes the process of reviewing applicants for ombudsman.
- 7 April
  - Bolivia votes against removing Russia from the United Nations Human Rights Council.
  - The Prosecutor's Office issues an arrest warrant against former FELCN director José María Velasco for allegedly covering-up drug trafficking in the Cochabamba Tropics.
  - During his first foreign visit to Argentina, President Arce and his Argentine counterpart Alberto Fernández sign a bilateral agreement for the sale of natural gas.
- 10 April – The Mixed Legislative Commission of the Constitution releases its list of the seventy-two qualified candidates for ombudsman.
- 13 April – Upon appeal, Nadia Cruz's candidacy is revoked by unanimous decision of the Mixed Legislative Commission of the Constitution.
- 15 April
  - The candidate challenge phase closes. Of 133 challenges, seven previously approved candidates are disqualified while one applicant successfully appeals their disqualification.
  - Through Law N° 1424, the Andean hairy armadillo is declared a natural heritage of Bolivia.
- 18 April
  - The Fourth Criminal Chamber of La Paz rules that Jeanine Áñez be prosecuted through a trial of responsibilities and not by ordinary means, in the case of an alleged irregular appointment of an official in the Bolivian Food Company (EBA).
  - With the presence of President Luis Arce and Vice President David Choquehuanca and the absence of MAS leader Evo Morales, the Pact of Unity holds a meeting among its leadership.
- 19 April
  - Marco Aramayo, the former director of the Indigenous Fund who denounced acts of corruption, dies after suffering cardiac arrest; he had spent seven years in preventative detention faced with 256 legal and criminal proceedings.
  - Rafael Quispe retracts his statements against Vice Minister of Justice César Siles, settling the legal process against him.
- 22 April – Pope Francis appoints Monsignor René Leigue as the new archbishop of Santa Cruz de la Sierra.
- 26 April – Civic Community announces its intent to make possible a trial of responsibilities against Jeanine Áñez.
- 27 April – President Luis Arce and the Bolivian Workers' Center (COB) announce a four percent raise in the minimum wage and a three percent increase in the salaries of contractors.

=== May ===
- 1 May – In commemoration of Labor Day, President Luis Arce promulgates four decrees in favor of workers' rights.
- 9 May – Four students die in a human avalanche after a tear gas canister explodes at the Tomás Frías Autonomous University.
- 21 May – Max Mendoza, the president of the Bolivian University Confederation (CUB)–noted for spending thirty-three years studying various careers but never graduating–is arrested for benefitting from an irregularly inflated salary.
- 24 May – Walter Nakashina is elected as the representative of the CUB. In the same meeting, Max Mendoza is expelled from the organization.
- 25 May
  - Carmelo Lenz, former governor of Beni, is sentenced to five years in prison on charges of improper use of influence stemming from an act of corruption committed in the construction of the Guayaramerín Airport.
  - Diego García-Sayán publishes his official report on the judicial system in Bolivia, highlighting multiple shortfalls in need of addressing.
- 26 May – The Plurinational Constitutional Court rejects Jeanine Áñez's motion to dismiss the Coup II Case filed against her.
- 27 May
  - President Arce attends the 21st Summit of ALBA Heads of State in Havana.
  - At the closing of the XIII National Congress of Universities, the Executive Committee of the Bolivian University (CEUB) elects Freddy Mendoza as its new national executive secretary.

=== November ===
- 23 November – The trial of former minister of government Arturo Murillo began in the United States.

=== December ===
- 28 December – Bolivian police detain opposition leader Luis Fernando Camacho. A reason for his arrest was not given.
- 30 December – A judge in Bolivia sentences opposition figure Luis Fernando Camacho to four months of pre-trial detention early on Friday on terrorism charges, as the opposition call for a national strike.

== Deaths ==
=== January ===
- 24 January – Jorge "Coco Manto" Mansilla Torres, 81, diplomat, humorist, journalist, poet, and writer (b. 1940)
- 25 January – Hector Borda Leaño, 94–95, anthropologist, poet, and politician (b. 1927)
- 26 January – Iván Guzmán de Rojas, 87, artist, mathematician, and scientist (b. 1934)
- 31 January – Gustavo Cárdenas Ayad, 60, narrator and poet (b. 1961)

=== February ===
- 8 February – Eugenio Natalini, 88, educator and priest (b. 1934)
- 13 February – Eduardo Pardo, 68, ambassador of Bolivia to Cuba (since 2021) (b. 1953)
- 14 February – Jorge Villanueva, 65–66, jazz and bossa nova guitarist (b. 1956)

=== March ===
- 3 March – Edwin Tapia, 86, journalist, politician, writer, and former director of Opinión (b. 1936)
- 8 March – Omar Ríos, 44, vocalist, founder of the band Deszaire (b. 1977)
- 10 March – Mario Terán, 79, warrant officer who carried out the execution of Che Guevara (b. 1941)
- 19 March – Ernesto Araníbar Quiroga, 71–72, minister of finance (1982–1983), minister of planning and coordination (1984) (b. 1951)

=== April ===
- 7 April – Jessica Román, 25, singer and television presenter (b. 1997)
- 16 April – Enrique Rocha Monroy, 89, writer (b. 1932)
- 19 April – Marco Aramayo, 54, former director of the Indigenous Fund (b. 1968)

=== July ===
- 7 July – Waldo Rubén Barrionuevo Ramírez, 54, Roman Catholic prelate, auxiliary bishop (2014–2019) and vicar apostolic (since 2019) of Reyes. (b. 1967)

=== August ===
- 7 August – Ernesto Cavour, 82, singer (Los Jairas) (b. 1940).

=== October ===
- 8 October – Luis Sáinz Hinojosa, 86, Roman Catholic prelate, auxiliary bishop of Cochabamba (1982–1987, 2001–2012) and archbishop of La Paz (1987–1996) (b. 1936).
- 17 October – Roberto Rojas, 55, politician, deputy (2010–2015) (b. 1966).

=== November ===
- 23 November – Jorge Medina Barra, 54, activist and politician

=== December ===
- 3 December – Milton Gómez, 74, mining union leader and politician, minister of labor, employment, and social security (2019) (b. 1948)
