= 2023 in Bolivia =

- Decades: 2000s; 2010s; 2020s
- See also: Other events of 2023; History of Bolivia • Years

The following is a chronology of notable events from the year 2023 in Bolivia.

== Incumbents ==
=== National government ===
- President: Luis Arce (MAS)
- Vice President: David Choquehuanca (MAS)
- President of the Supreme Tribunal of Justice: Ricardo Torres
- President of the Supreme Electoral Tribunal: Oscar Hassenteufel
- President of the Plurinational Constitutional Tribunal: Paul Franco
- President of the Senate: Andrónico Rodríguez (MAS)
- President of the Chamber of Deputies: Jerges Mercado (PCB)
- Assembly: 3rd

== Events by month ==
=== January ===
- 1-9 January -
  - Protests continue in Santa Cruz de la Sierra over Governor Luis Fernando Camacho’s arrest; police impose movement restrictions.
- 1 January -
- Criminal justice authorities register the first two incidents of femicide in the country.
- President Luis Arce attends Luiz Inácio Lula da Silva’s inauguration in Brazil and meets Russian officials to discuss bilateral relations.

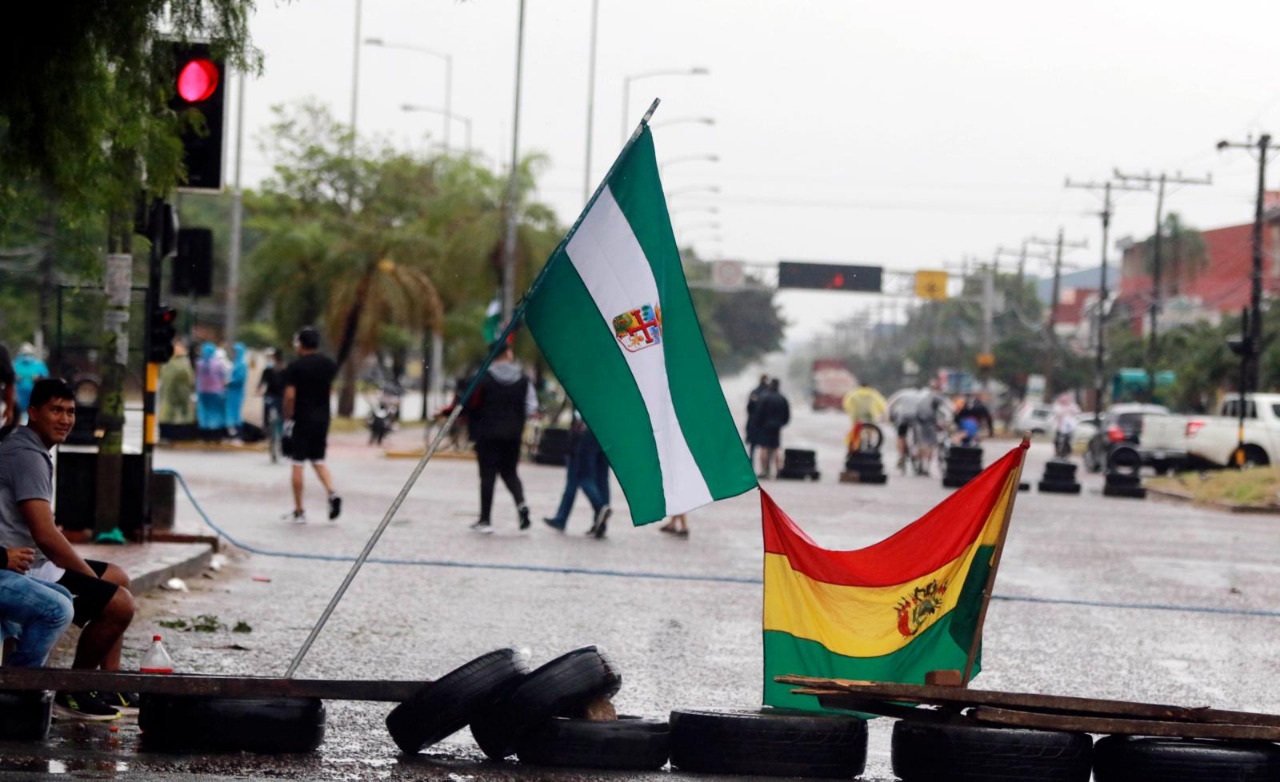
The year started with unrest in Santa Cruz Department (Bolivia) over the detention of the region's governor.

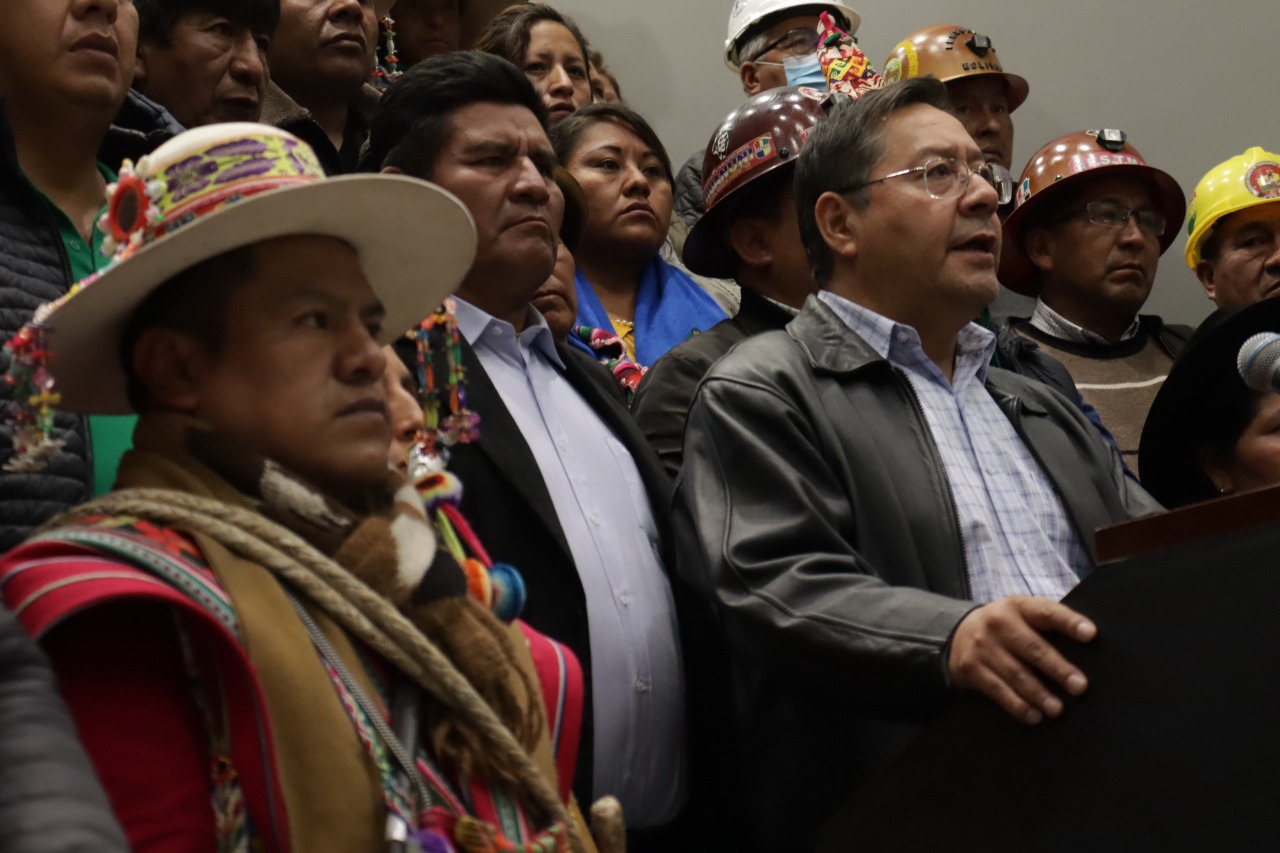
As protests spread, pro-government groups initiated their own marches.

- 2 January -
  - From prison, Camacho suffers significant health decompensation, including partial muscle and nerve paralysis. A hearing on whether the governor should be transferred to a hospital is opened at the Eighth Criminal Sentencing Court of Santa Cruz but is quickly suspended after the judge declines jurisdiction at the request of the Prosecutor's Office.
- 3 January -
  - The Supreme Tribunal of Justice and Plurinational Constitutional Court inaugurate the legal year, while at a third event in the city, magistrate Tereza Garrón is sworn in as president of the Agro-environmental Tribunal.
  - After over half a year in preventative detention, Max Mendoza, a former student leader accused of corruption, is released from San Pedro prison on house arrest and his bail is set at Bs 40,000.
- 9 January - Wilfredo Gutiérrez is sworn in as vice minister of transport, replacing Israel Ticona.

=== February ===
- 15 February - Heavy rain and hail causes flooding and landslides in Chuquisaca Department; 2,294 families are affected, 582 households are displaced, and one fatality is reported.

=== March ===
- 31 March - The World Bank approves an Inspection Panel investigation into the Santa Cruz Road Corridor Connector Project (San Ignacio - San José). Subsequent attempts at dispute resolution fail.

=== April ===
- 13 April - The government of Bolivia calls on the armed forces to tighten border controls in order to prevent the smuggling of state-subsidized fuel.

=== May ===
- 15 May -
  - Bolivia conducts a simulation exercise, using a board game format, to strengthen its National Deployment and Vaccination Plan for influenza and other respiratory viruses.
  - Demonstrators protest outside the offices of the Bolivian Episcopal Conference in La Paz with signs calling for sexual education without Church interference and denouncing priestly abuse.
- 31 May - Pope Francis sends a letter to President Luis Arce expressing sorrow and dismay over reports of sexual abuse by priests in Bolivia, pledging the Catholic Church’s cooperation with state investigations.

=== June ===
- 14 June - Bolivia’s Catholic Church announces the creation of four commissions to prevent, investigate, and address cases of sexual abuse within the institution.

=== October ===
- 31 October - Bolivia cut diplomatic relations with Israel.

=== November ===
- 17 November - Demonstrators protest forest fires and gold mining in protected areas in La Paz, calling for the protection of forests and Indigenous lands.

=== December ===
- 30 December - The Constitutional Court disqualifies former president Evo Morales from running for re-election in 2025, reversing a 2017 ruling that had allowed him to seek a fourth term.

== Deaths ==
- 9 January – Martín Alipaz, 57, photojournalist (b. 1966)
