= 2021 in Bolivia =

- Decades: 2000s; 2010s; 2020s
- See also: Other events of 2021; History of Bolivia • Years

Events in the year 2021 in Bolivia.

== Incumbents ==
=== National government ===
- President: Luis Arce (MAS-IPSP)
- Vice President: David Choquehuanca (MAS-IPSP)
- President of the Chamber of Senators: Andrónico Rodríguez (MAS-IPSP)
- President of the Chamber of Deputies: Freddy Mamani Laura (MAS-IPSP)
- Assembly: 3rd

Governors
- Governor of Beni:
  - Fanor Amapo (Movement for Socialism) (acting: until 3 May)
  - Alejandro Unzueta (Third System Movement) (since 3 May)
- Governor of Chuquisaca:
  - Efraín Balderas (Movement for Socialism) (acting: until 3 May)
  - Damián Condori (We are all Chuquisaca) (since 3 May)
- Governor of Cochabamba:
  - Esther Soria (Movement for Socialism) (acting: until 3 May)
  - Humberto Sánchez (Movement for Socialism) (since 3 May)
- Governor of La Paz:
  - Félix Patzi (Third System Movement) (until 3 May)
  - Santos Quispe (Jallalla La Paz)/(Forward United People) (since 3 May)
- Governor of Oruro:
  - Edson Oczachoque (Movement for Socialism) (acting: until 3 May)
  - Johnny Vedia (Movement for Socialism) (since 3 May)
- Governor of Pando:
  - Paola Terrazas (Movement for Socialism) (acting: until 3 May)
  - Regis Richter (Third System Movement) (since 3 May)
- Governor of Potosí:
  - Eloy Calizaya (Movement for Socialism) (acting: until 3 May)
  - Jhonny Mamani (Movement for Socialism) (since 3 May)
- Governor of Santa Cruz:
  - Rubén Costas (Social Democratic Movement) (until 3 May)
  - Luis Fernando Camacho (Creemos) (since 3 May)
- Governor of Tarija:
  - Adrián Oliva (Community of Everyone) (until 3 May)
  - Oscar Montes Barzón (United for Change) (since 3 May)

== Events ==
Ongoing — COVID-19 pandemic in Bolivia

- 28 January – María Teresa Mercado, Mexican ambassador who was declared persona non grata during the 2019–2020 Mexico–Bolivia diplomatic crisis, is reappointed ambassador at the request of the government of President Luis Arce.
- 31 January – The doctors′ union pushes for new lockdown as hospitals approach saturation. An average of one health worker dies every day. The total number of COVID-19 cases approaches 210,000 as the first 20,000 doses of Sputnik V COVID-19 vaccine arrive.
- 7 February – Environmental authorities investigate the deaths of 35 Andean condors, which is an endangered species.
- 18 February – Health workers announce a general strike from 18 to 28 February against the Ley de Emergencia Sanitaria (Emergency Health Law).
- 2 March – Twenty people are killed and 25 others injured in a bus accident in Colomi, Cochabamba Department.
- 3 March – Six people are killed when a railing collapses and they fall four floors 16.7 m (55 ft) during a student protest at the Universidad Pública de El Alto (UPEA). Three of the organizers of the event are arrested and charged with homicide, and eight others are sought by the police.
- 7 March – Regional elections are held in all nine Departments of Bolivia for governors, mayors, councillors, and departmental assemblies.
- 12 March – The government orders the arrest of former president Jeanine Áñez (2019–2020) and members of her government for terrorism, sedition, and conspiracy.
- April (date unknown) – Members of Evo Morales′s personal bodyguard attended a rally in Plaza San Francisco dressed in uniforms belonging to the army of former Venezuelan president Hugo Chávez.
- 12 June – COVID-19: Marcel Ebrad Mexican Foreign Minister, announced on May 12 that Mexico will donate 400,000 doses of Oxford–AstraZeneca COVID-19 vaccine to Belize, Bolivia, and Paraguay.
- 19 November – Edgar Pary is appointed Minister for Education.

== Deaths ==
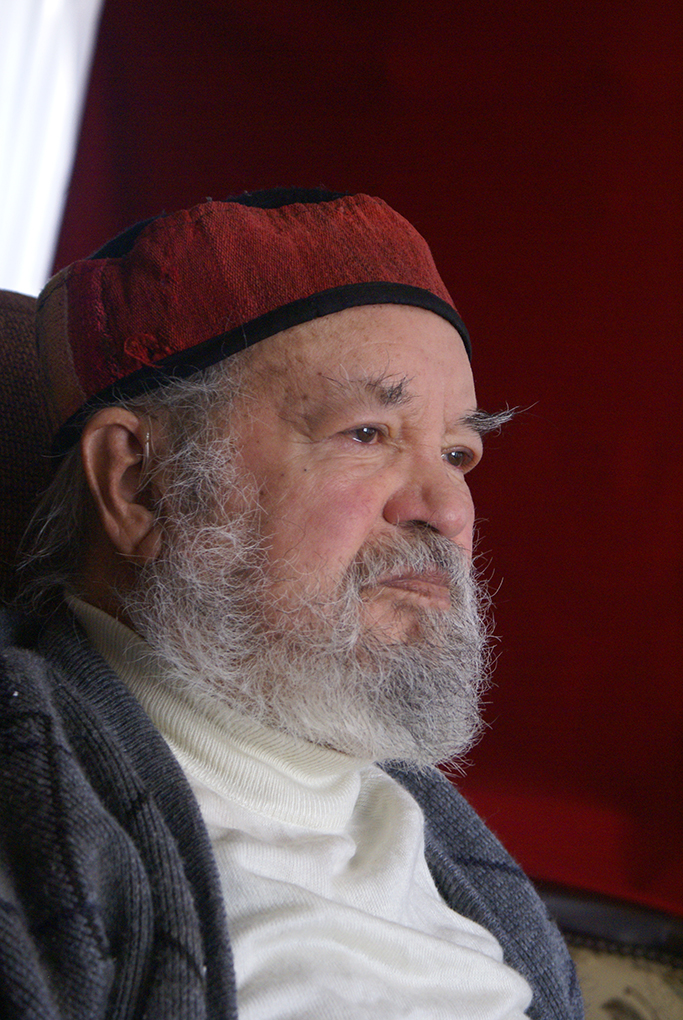
Gil Imaná

=== January ===
- 12 January – Osvaldo Peredo, revolutionary leader (b. 1941)
- 19 January – Felipe "El Mallku" Quispe, Quechua leader and politician (b. 1942)
- 28 January – Gil Imaná, muralist and painter (b. 1933)

=== May ===
- 30 May – Luisa Molina, folk singer (b. 1955)

=== June ===
- 7 June – Jaime Junaro, singer (b. 1949)

=== August ===
- 4 August – Moisés Torres, journalist, professor and politician, deputy (1997–2002) (COVID-19; b. 1949)

=== September ===
- 24 September – Pablo Ramos, economist (b. 1937)

=== December ===
- 26 December – Agustín Saavedra Weise, diplomat and writer, president of the Central Bank and Foreign Minister of Bolivia (1982) (b. 1943)

== See also ==
- Organization of American States
- Amazon Cooperation Treaty Organization
- Bolivarian Alliance for the Peoples of Our America
