= Óscar Hassenteufel =

Bolivian judge (born 1945)

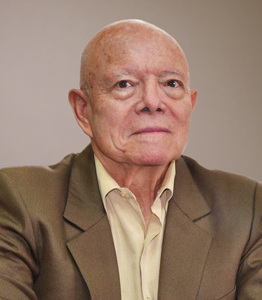
- Official portrait, 2020

6th President of the Supreme Electoral Tribunal of Bolivia
- Incumbent
- Assumed office 30 April 2021
- Preceded by: Salvador Romero

President of the National Electoral Court of Bolivia
- In office 5 November 2002 – 30 March 2006
- Preceded by: Luis Ramiro Beltrán
- Succeeded by: Salvador Romero

President of the Supreme Court of Justice of Bolivia
- In office 1 June 1999 – 30 April 2001
- Preceded by: Edgar Rosales
- Succeeded by: Guillermo Arancibia (acting)
Other judicial offices
Magistrate of the Supreme
Electoral Tribunal of Bolivia
Incumbent
Assumed office
19 December 2019
Magistrate of the National
Electoral Court of Bolivia
In office
1 August 2001 – 30 March 2006
Magistrate of the Supreme
Court of Justice of Bolivia
In office
18 February 1993 – 30 April 2001

Personal details
- Born: Óscar Abel Hassenteufel Salazar; 14 April 1945 (age 81) Ticucha, Chuquisaca, Bolivia
- Education: University of San Francisco Xavier
- Occupation: Jurist; lawyer

Óscar Abel Hassenteufel Salazar (/ˈhɑːsəntɔɪfəl/; born 14 April 1945) is a Bolivian lawyer and jurist serving as president of the Supreme Electoral Tribunal since 2021. A perennial figure in the Bolivian judiciary, Hassenteufel previously held seats on the now-defunct Supreme Court of Justice from 1993 to 2001 and National Electoral Court from 2001 to 2006, presiding over both bodies from 1999 to 2001 and 2002 to 2006, respectively.

Raised in a political family from eastern Chuquisaca, Hassenteufel attended the University of San Francisco Xavier, where he earned a doctorate of law in 1969. Having clerked for the High Court of Chuquisaca while in university, he entered the legal field as an examining magistrate for the Vaca Díez and Azurduy provinces. In addition to his own private practice, Hassenteufel also held public positions in the Prosecutor's Office and Comptroller General's Office prior to his appointment to the Supreme Court. Elected by the National Congress in 1993, he assumed the presidency of the high court in 1999, a position he exercised until his resignation in 2001. Less than half a year after vacating his seat on the Supreme Court, Hassenteufel was appointed to the National Electoral Court, serving as its vice president from 2001 to 2002 and president from 2002 to 2006.

Following his retirement, Hassenteufel returned to private practice, during which time he headed the Professional Football League's Tribunal of Sports Justice. In 2019, he emerged from retirement to seek a seat on the Supreme Electoral Tribunal, whose previous members had been deposed and arrested amid an ongoing electoral and political crisis. Appointed alongside five other new members, Hassenteufel assisted in holding the snap 2020 general election and the 2021 regional elections that followed and assumed the presidency of the electoral court upon the resignation of his predecessor, Salvador Romero.

== Early life and career ==
Óscar Hassenteufel was born on 14 April 1945 on a guayabilla farm in Ticucha, a small town situated in Chuquisaca's Luis Calvo Province. His father, Dardo Hassenteufel, was a regionally influential member of the Revolutionary Nationalist Movement, a party with a historically strong partisan base in the Chaco Boreal, the lowland region encompassing Chuquisaca's easternmost provinces; he served as sub-prefect of Luis Calvo from 1956 to 1960, was mayor of Muyupampa from 1967 to 1969, and represented the department as a substitute senator from 1985 to 1989. While Hassenteufel's brother, Antonio, followed their father into politics—representing the Revolutionary Nationalist Movement in the Chamber of Deputies from 1989 to 1993—Óscar took a different path, and though briefly affiliated with the Social Democratic Party's youth wing, he remained politically independent for most of his life.

Hassenteufel began his education in the neighboring town of Monteagudo before being sent to live with relatives in Tartagal, Salta, where he completed his primary schooling. While in Argentina, Hassenteufel quickly assimilated into Argentine culture, even nearly renouncing his Bolivian nationality in order to serve in the Argentine Navy, only to be denied permission and forced home by his father. He then completed his secondary education at the Sacred Hearth School in Sucre.

At his father's urging, Hassenteufel studied medicine at the University of San Francisco Xavier; however, he quickly switched his major to law just two days after enrolling. He finally graduated as a lawyer in 1969, receiving degrees in political and social science as well as a doctorate of law. While in university, he worked as a law clerk for the High Court of Chuquisaca between 1967 and 1968 and was an actuary for the First Criminal Court from 1968 to 1969.

Shortly after graduating, Hassenteufel was hired as an examining magistrate, overseeing cases in the Vaca Díez and later Azurduy provinces between 1969 and 1970. After briefly serving as superintendent of mines in Potosí, Hassenteufel moved to La Paz in 1971, where he was brought on as a public official in the Prosecutor's Office, working for a short time as a civil prosecutor before shifting focus to criminal procedure from 1971 to 1973. In his final public functions outside the judiciary, Hassenteufel served as a legal advisor for the Central Bank from 1989 to 1991 before moving on to the Comptroller General's Office, where he managed the body's legal analysis and responsibility promotion departments from 1991 to 1993.

In education, Hassenteufel worked as a docent at various universities. He gave lectures on mining law at the University of San Francisco Xavier and taught courses on civil and constitutional law at the Higher University of San Andrés. Between 1979 and 1980, he worked as a legal advisor for the Executive Committee of Bolivian Universities, later serving as the institute's secretary general from 1983 to 1986. That year, he was hired to head the legal department at Gabriel René Moreno University, where he worked until 1987.

== Judicial career ==
=== Supreme Court of Justice: 1993–2001 ===
The early 1990s brought significant reforms to the Bolivian judicial system, including new regulations surrounding the designation of magistrates to the Supreme Court of Justice. With the imposition of a two-thirds threshold for the election of magistrates, lawmakers in Congress were now required to seek bipartisan consensus to appoint new members. In 1993, Hassenteufel was among the first group of impartial jurists elected under this system, representing the Chuquisaca Department on the high court. In 1999, he assumed the presidency of the Supreme Court, overseeing the body until 2001, when he resigned his seat, ostensibly for health reasons.

Despite his stated reasoning, the true motives for Hassenteufel's unexpected decision to step down were questioned by outside observers. For Aurelio Vásquez, president of the Potosí Bar Association, Hassenteufel's abdication responded to political pressures, a natural evolution of the increased politicization the court had experienced since the mid-1990s, stemming from the distortion of the two-thirds rule from its intended purpose of guaranteeing judicial independence in favor of a system in which the largest congressional parties negotiated their own "quota" of partisan magistrates. This was reflected by the internal crisis the Supreme Court experienced following Hassenteufel's departure. Faced with the need for a new president, the court found itself unable to reach the necessary consensus to elect one from among its members. The prolonged debate took nearly a year to resolve, with Armando Villafuerte finally assuming the presidency in early 2002 after two other magistrates had held it in an acting capacity.

=== National Electoral Court: 2001–2006 ===
Health concerns notwithstanding, within half a year of his departure from the Supreme Court, Hassenteufel returned to the judiciary, this time as a magistrate on the National Electoral Court. Sworn in at the beginning of August 2001, Hassenteufel exercised the vice presidency of the court for just over a year, during which time he assisted in organizing the 2002 general election. In November of that year, following the surprise resignation of Luis Ramiro Beltrán, he assumed the presidency of the court. Hassenteufel's tenure saw major developments in the Bolivian electoral system, as internal unrest and popular demonstrations pushed the government to incorporate new forms of direct democracy into the Constitution. Aside from the 2004 municipal and 2005 general elections, the Electoral Court was also tasked with organizing the country's first-ever popular referendum as well as the first direct election of prefects in all nine departments. Reelected to a second term in 2005, Hassenteufel oversaw the first stages of the 2006 Constituent Assembly referendum and autonomy plebiscites in the nine departments, although personal family matters ultimately led him to resign his seat before fully seeing them through.

=== Tribunal of Sports Justice: 2006–2019 ===
Following his retirement from the Electoral Court, Hassenteufel returned to private practice. In 2006, together with his sons, he established the law firm Hassenteufel & Associates. Four years later, in 2010, the firm was contracted by the Professional Football League to hold jurisdiction over its Tribunal of Sports Justice, a five-member panel of jurists charged with arbitrating and issuing sanctions or expulsions against rules-breaking players, coaches, and other league members. The tribunal was the first of its kind in Bolivia to be entirely impartial, replacing the previous system, in which league clubs directly appointed their own delegates to arbitrate disputes and violations. With the exception of 2021 and until 2023, Hassenteufel & Associates' contract with the league was renewed every year successively from 2010 on, with Hassenteufel himself presiding over the tribunal until late 2019.

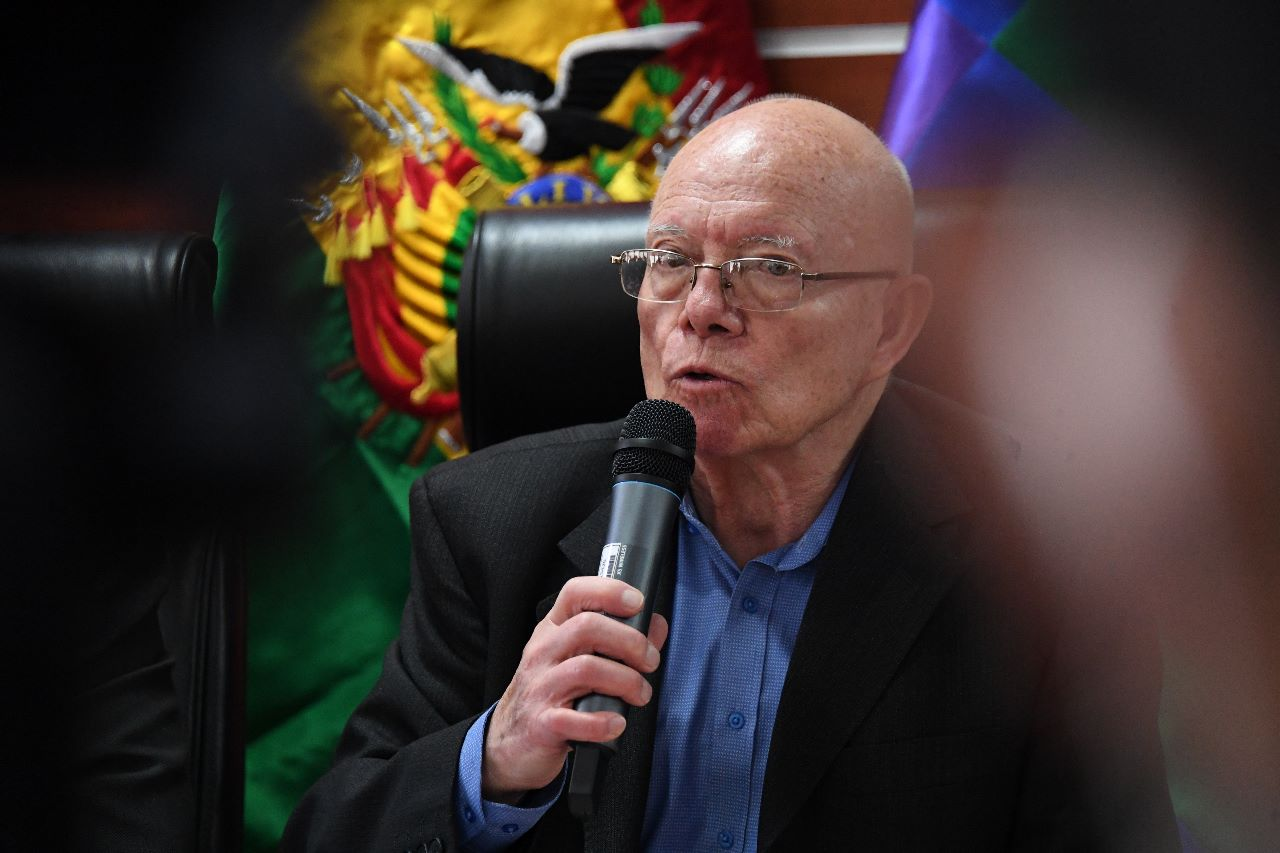
In 2019, Hassenteufel returned to the judiciary after a thirteen-year absence.

=== Supreme Electoral Tribunal: 2019–present ===
As Hassenteufel's tenure at the Tribunal of Sports Justice drew to a close, the opportunity to once again return to the judiciary arose. In November 2019, Hassenteufel submitted his application for a seat on the Supreme Electoral Tribunal—the successor body to the National Electoral Court—seeking to fill one of the vacancies left by the court's seven previous members, all of whom had been ousted and arrested on suspicion of fraud in that year's general election. He was among six applicants selected by the Legislative Assembly to compose the reconstituted court, alongside Salvador Romero, whom the president designated.

With Romero at its head, Hassenteufel and the other five magistrates undertook the challenge of organizing snap general elections for 2020, in addition to subnational elections the following year. The tribunal handled both processes successfully, even as it faced the added hurdle of holding two nationwide votes amid a public health crisis brought about by the COVID-19 pandemic. Shortly after the final 2021 results were tabulated, Romero resigned his seat and position as president of the tribunal, with the five remaining magistrates electing Hassenteufel to succeed him.

Legal offices
Preceded by Edgar Rosales	President of the Supreme Court of Justice of Bolivia; 1999–2001	Succeeded by Guillermo Arancibia; Acting
Preceded by Alfredo Bocángel	Vice President of the National Electoral Court of Bolivia; 2001–2002	Succeeded by Gonzalo Lema
Preceded by Luis Ramiro Beltrán	President of the National Electoral Court of Bolivia; 2002–2006	Succeeded by Salvador Romero
Preceded by Salvador Romero	President of the Supreme Electoral Tribunal of Bolivia; 2021–present	Incumbent
