= Percy Fernández =

Bolivian politician (1939–2025)

Percy Fernández Añez (14 February 1939 – 1 September 2025) was a Bolivian civil engineer and politician.

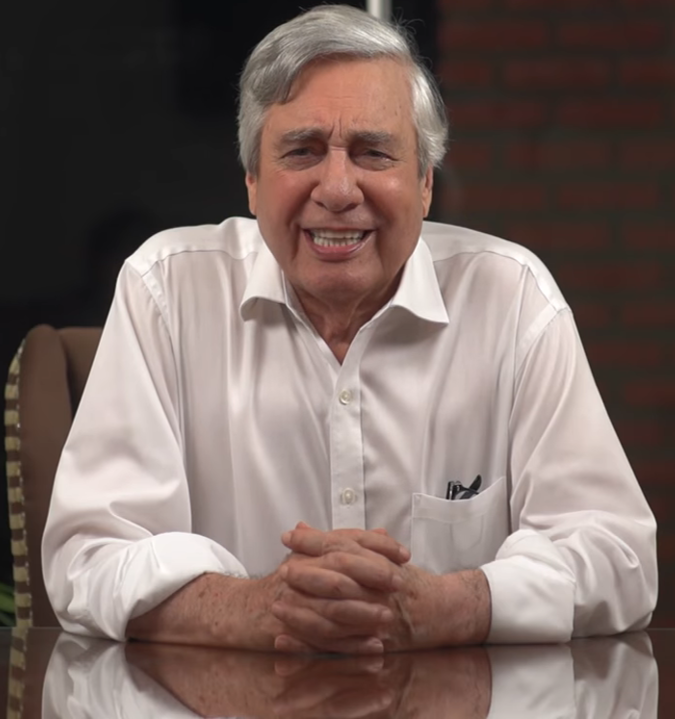
Fernández in 2015

== Life and career ==
Fernández was born in Santa Cruz de la Sierra on 14 February 1939. He was elected vice-president of the Public Works Committee of Santa Cruz, of which he was later its president. And a couple of years later, he was the first President of the Regional Development Corporation of Santa Cruz.

He was Elected President of the Pro Santa Cruz Committee in 1983, and re-elected the following year, he led the preparation of the first Departmental Governments and Decentralization Bill.

Fernández was elected Senator of the Republic in 1989. And then elected by popular vote Mayor of Santa Cruz de la Sierra, a position he would hold for three consecutive terms, between 1990 and 1995 (January 1990 – October 1991; January 1992 – October 1993; January 1994 – October 1995). He was elected City Councilor from 1996 to 2004. Again Mayor, for five years from January 2005 to January 2010 and re-elected on 4 April 2010, until 2015.

As a candidate of the Revolutionary Nationalist Movement (MNR), he was the winner of the elections in 1989, 1991 and 1993, while in 2005 he was a candidate of the Broad Front Together for All (FAJPT) and in 2010 he formed his second citizen group, called Santa Cruz Para Todos (SPT), being elected on 4 April as mayor with 52% of the votes.

In 2015 he was reelected for what would be, constitutionally, his last term from 2015 to 2020, a term that was extended by law after the political crisis of 2019 and that he could not finish for health reasons (being in risk groups for COVID-19).

Fernández died on 1 September 2025, at the age of 86.
