= Bicentennial of Bolivia =

200th anniversary of Peru

- Date: 6 August 2025
- Location: Bolivia
- Major events: 200th anniversary of the adoption of the Declaration of Independence

The Bicentennial of Bolivia (Spanish: Bicentenario de Bolivia) occurred on 6 August 2025 and is considered in Bolivia to be the beginning of independence due to the Chuquisaca Revolution of 1809. In 2025, the bicentennial of the Bolivian Declaration of Independence was celebrated in the same way. As part of the events for the bicentennial, on 31 August 2022, the Bolivian Bicentennial campaign was officially launched in the nine departmental capitals of the country.

== Background ==
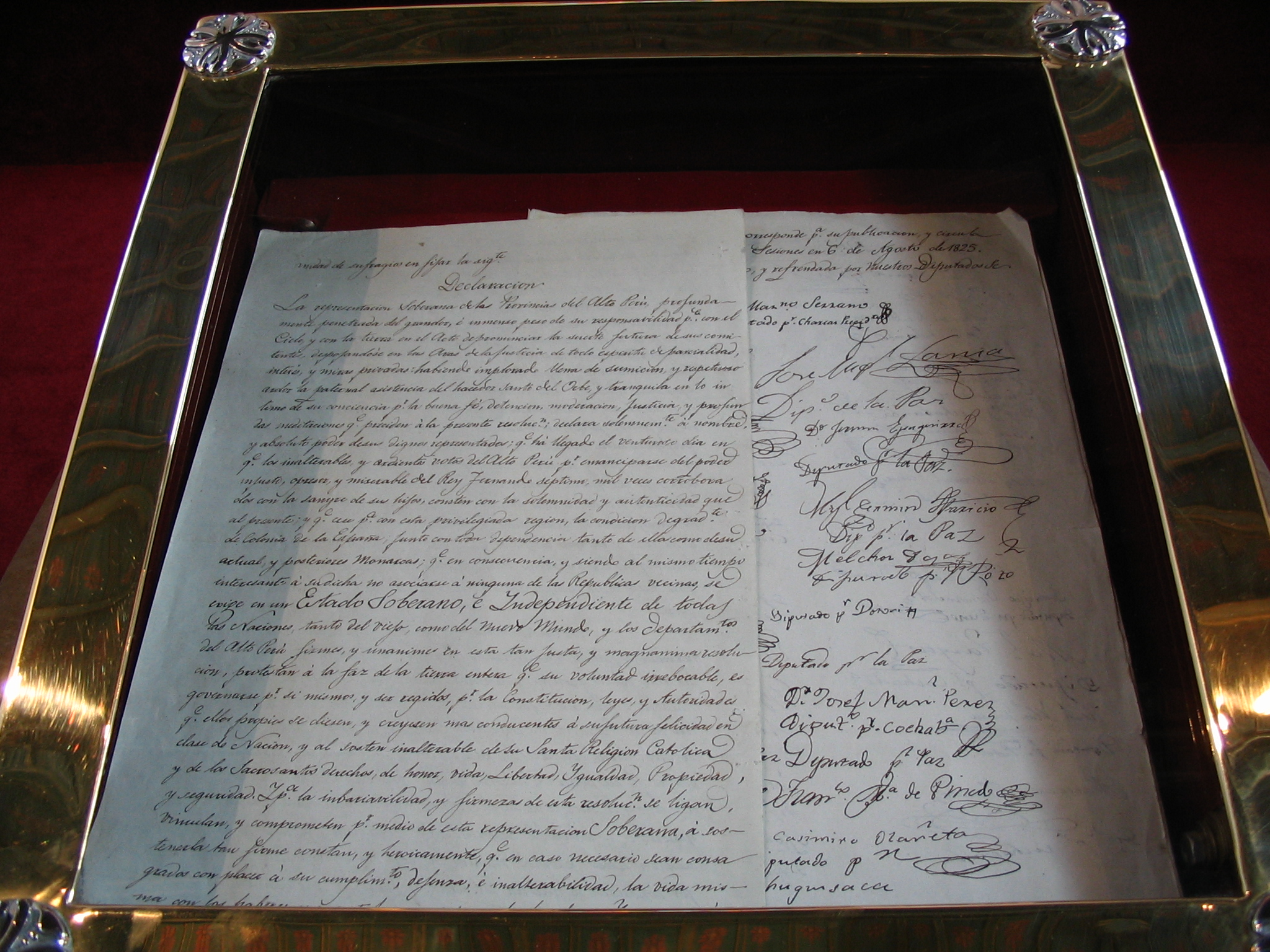
Act of independence of the Republic of Bolivia.

The Chuquisaca Revolution was the popular uprising against the governor-intendant of the city of Chuquisaca, currently known as Sucre, which occurred on 25 May 1809. The Real Audiencia of Charcas, with the support of the university faculty and pro-independence sectors, dismissed the governor. and they formed a governing board. The movement, loyal in principle to King Ferdinand VII, was justified by suspicions that the government planned to hand over the country to Infanta Carlota Joaquina de Borbón, but from the beginning it served as a framework for the actions of the pro-independence sectors that propagated the rebellion to La Paz, where the Tuitiva Junta would be established. This last and most radical uprising was violently repressed, and the Chuquisaca movement was finally dissolved.

The independence of Bolivia was officially proclaimed on 6 August 1825 at a Congress held in the city of Chuquisaca (present-day Sucre).

== Preparation ==
During 2009, the city of La Paz was declared Ibero-American Capital of Culture. La Paz celebrated the second most important festival of the Bolivian bicentennial. On 17 November 2020, President Luis Arce promulgated Law No. 1347, also known as the Bolivian Bicentennial Law. In this law, the years 2020 to 2025 were declared as the five-year period of preparations for the bicentennial of the founding of Bolivia.

== Bicentennial legacy ==
Notable government works, projects and programs projected for 2025 included:

- Five Houses of Memory in the departments of La Paz, Chuquisaca, Santa Cruz, Cochabamba and Oruro

== See also ==
- Bicentennial of Argentina
- Bicentennial of Chile
- Celebration of Mexican political anniversaries in 2010
- United States Bicentennial
