= Bicentennial of Chile =

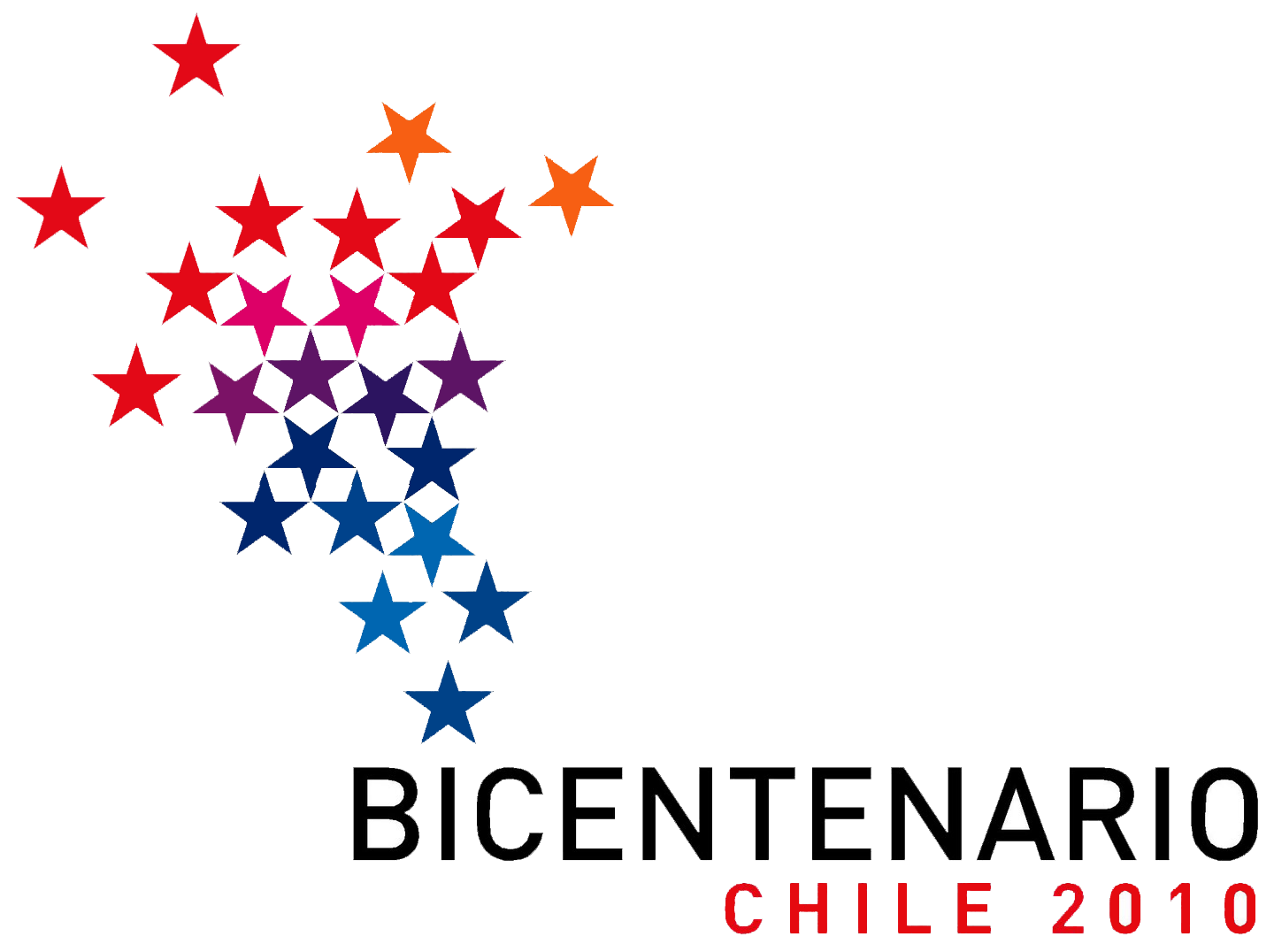
Logo of the Bicentennial of Chile.

The Bicentennial of Chile (Spanish: Bicentenario de Chile) took place on September 18, 2010. The celebration commemorates the beginning of the Independence process in Chile, with the first Government Junta of Chile on September 18, 1810, and Chile's becoming a free and independent country eight years later. Several activities were prepared for this occasion by the Chilean Government.

The logotype Logo Bicentenario was created in 2007 by the advertising agency Lowe Porta. The stars on it are an abstract representation of Latin American countries, and "happiness, celebrations and optimism."

== Background ==
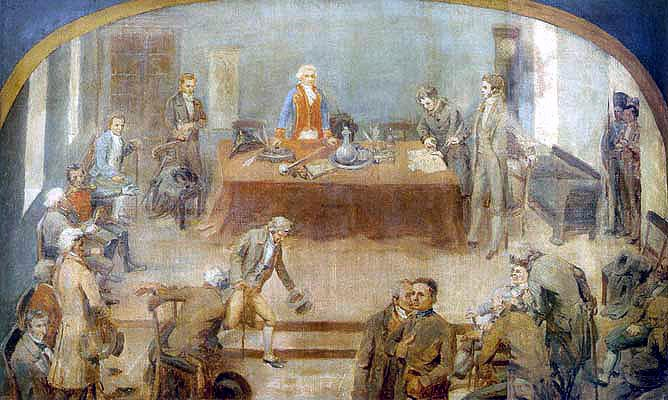
First Government Junta of Chile, in 1810. It was presided over by Mateo de Toro y Zambrano.

The Government Junta of 1810 marked the beginning of the political independence of Chile. It was a government body created by the open council (cabildo) of Santiago de Chile on September 18, 1810, in order to organize Chile governmentally and to take actions regarding the government's defense, after Ferdinand VII was taken prisoner by Napoleon Bonaparte in 1808. The Junta was the first autonomous form of government originated in central Chile since its conquest, and was presided over by the Governor of Chile, Mateo de Toro y Zambrano. It allowed the participation of the creole aristocracy, and it marked the beginning of the Chilean War of Independence. The Junta assembled a National Congress, which José Miguel Carrera overturned with a coup d'état.

Bernardo O'Higgins was granted dictatorial powers as Supreme Director of Chile on February 16, 1817, and Chile officially declared its independence on February 12, 1818.

== Plan Bicentenario ==
The Plan Bicentenario (English: Bicentennial Plan) was started during the government of Ricardo Lagos and was scheduled to be completed on September 18, 2010. A committee called the Comisión Bicentenario was established on October 16, 2002, through Supreme Decree N° 176.

Several plans were made for the event, amongst them: the construction of major roadworks and infrastructure, such as the Plaza de la Ciudadanía, and cultural works, such as the La Moneda Palace Cultural Centre (Centro Cultural Palacio de la Moneda), the Library of Santiago (Biblioteca de Santiago) and the Matucana 100 Cultural Centre (Centro Cultural Matucana 100).

However, the Puente Bicentenario (Bicentennial Bridge), which was to connect Chiloé Island with Continental Chile, was canceled after the estimated cost exceeded the budgeted funds, yet the project was revived in 2012.

=== Postage stamps ===
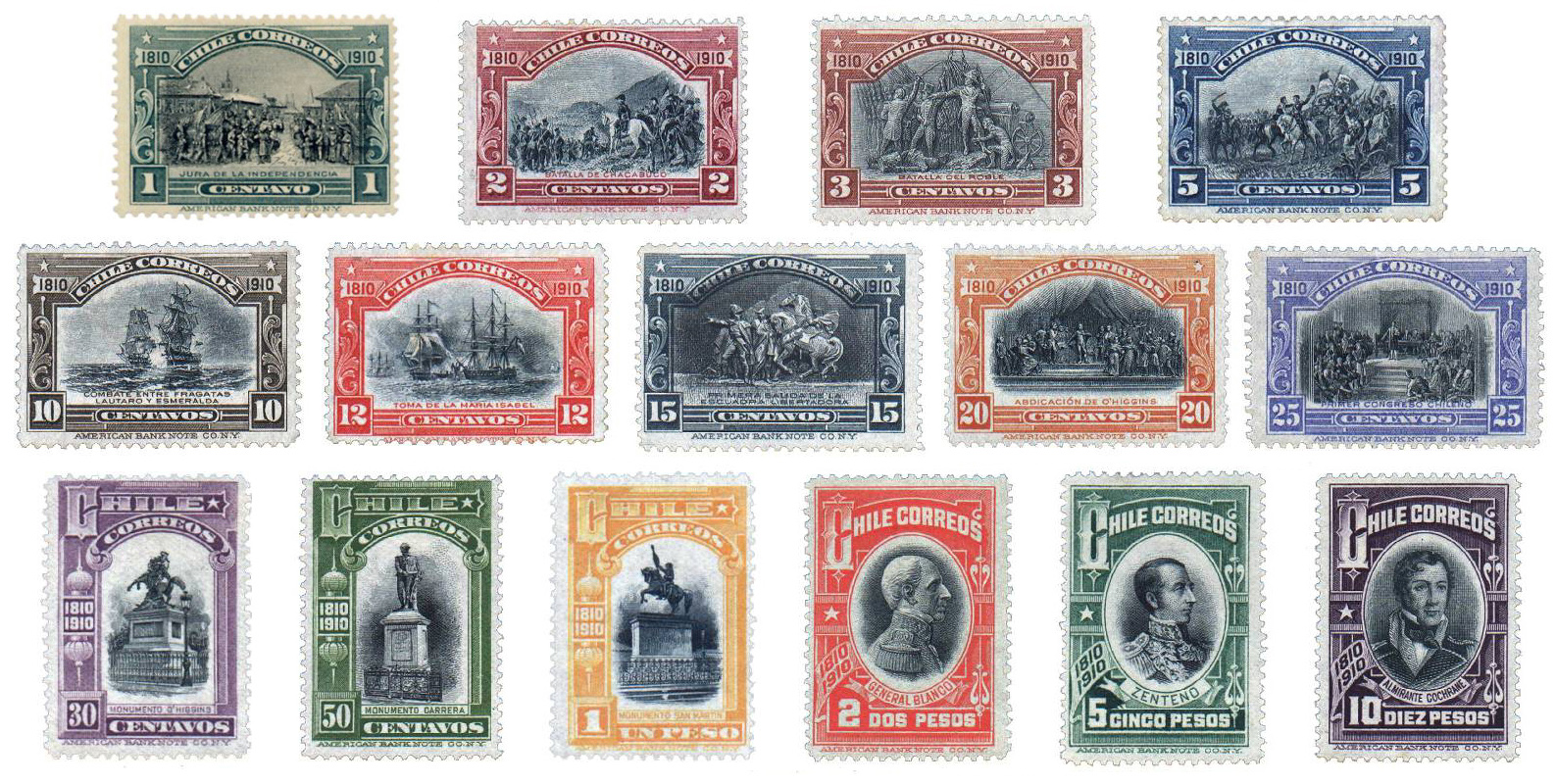
Commemorative stamps of the Centennial of Chile, which were re-designed and re-printed in 2009.

In 2008 Correos de Chile started a public competition to design postage stamps to commemorate the Bicentennial. The contestants were divided into four categories: Basic Education (Enseñanza Básica), Secondary Education (Enseñanza Media), Higher Education (Enseñanza Superior) and Visual Artist (Artista Visual). The winning designs were submitted in 2009, and were created by Andrea Barreda (Basic Education), Javiera Monreal (High School), Joshua Arevalo (Higher Education), and Patricio Díaz (Visual Artist). The Bicentennial stamp series was officially launched on October 15, 2009.

On April 20, 2009, Correos de Chile launched a special issue of 15 stamps that were used for the centenary celebrations of Chile. The stamps, dating from 1910, bore the official logo of the Bicentennial, and were sold for 310 Chilean pesos (US$0.62). 30,000 copies were printed. A stamp with the official logo of the Bicentennial was also released.

=== Medal ===
The Chilean Mint (Casa de Moneda de Chile) created an oval medal designed by Verónica Astaburuaga. The Bicentennial logo is on the obverse side, and on the reverse a map of Chile, showing the Pacific Ocean, the Andes Mountains and the Andean Cross. Two versions of the medal exist, one made of silver, and another of bronze.

== Non-governmental initiatives ==
Several non-governmental initiatives also sought to highlight the celebration of the Bicentennial. These included:

- Edificio Titanium La Portada in Las Condes, inaugurated on May 3, 2010. It is the first building 200 metres (660 ft) high built in Chile by a private company (Inmobiliaria Titanium). It did not suffer any structural damage in the February 27, 2010 earthquake.
- A replica of Corbeta Esmeralda in Iquique, by Minera Collahuasi. Its cost is estimated at US$3 million.
- The construction of the tallest skyscraper in Chile, Torre Gran Costanera by Cencosud in Providencia, Santiago.
- "Lágrimas de Luna" Exposition in New York City, 2009, underwritten by Empresas CMPC and El Mercurio. The exposition included several Mapuche jewels.

=== Television ===
The Chilean television channels created several shows to commemorate the Bicentennial. Canal 13 produced shows such as Flor de País (Flower of Country), Héroes (Heroes), Los 80 (The Eighties), Recomiendo Chile ([I] Recommend Chile), Santiago no es Chile (Santiago is not Chile) and Voy y Vuelvo ([I'll] go and come back [later]). Televisión Nacional de Chile has broadcast shows such as Chile Elige (Chile Chooses), Hora 25 (25th Hour), Grandes Chilenos de Nuestra Historia (Great Chileans of Our History, based on the BBC's 100 Greatest Britons), Epopeya (Epic), and Algo habrán hecho por la historia de Chile (They must have done something for the history of Chile). Chilevisión created the miniseries Postales, that lasts about a minute and a half. Chilevisión also dramatized guerrilla Manuel Rodríguez Erdoíza's biography on the homonymic TV series. Starting in 2008, La Red exhibited Agenda Bicentenario (Bicentennial Schedule), showing important places of Chile during its history. Finally, Megavisión launched the TV series Adiós al Séptimo de Línea (Goodbye to the Seventh Line) in 2010, based on Jorge Inostroza's homonymic book.

== Controversies ==
There was criticism of celebrating the Bicentennial of Chile in 2010, because Chile gained its independence on February 12, 1818, when Bernardo O'Higgins approved the Independence Act of Chile. However, the Centennial of Chile was celebrated in 1910, under the presidencies of Pedro Montt (who died on August 16, 1910), Elías Fernández Albano (temporary), Emiliano Figueroa Larraín (temporary) and Ramón Barros Luco. The other countries celebrating their bicentennials in 2010 also celebrate the beginning of their independence process through the creation of their First Government Junta, including Venezuela on April 19, Argentina on May 25, Colombia on July 20, Mexico on September 16, and Bolivia on May 25, 1809.

The regions of Arica and Parinacota and Tarapacá faced a historical paradox. These regions celebrated the Bicentennial, but they have belonged to Chile only for 130 years, because they were formerly part of Peru, which gained its independence in 1821.

== See also ==
- Bicentennial of Argentina
- Bicentennial of Bolivia
- Celebration of Mexican political anniversaries in 2010
- United States Bicentennial
