= Sacred Heart College, Sucre =

Sacred Heart College
- Spanish: Colegio del Sagrado Corazón
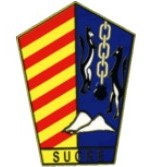

Location
- Junín #651; Inner City of Sucre, Chuquisaca; Bolivia
- Coordinates: 19°2′47″S 65°15′41″W

Information
- Type: Private primary and secondary school
- Motto: Be more to Serve better
- Religious affiliation: Catholicism
- Denomination: Jesuit
- Established: 1912; 114 years ago
- Status: Private Co-educationalMixed school
- Director: Arturo M.P. Pacheco
- Staff: 10
- Teaching staff: 75
- Enrollment: 1,380 (2012)
- Colors: Blue and white
- Athletics: Stormers Sporting Club
- Mascot: Two wolves
- Nickname: El Sagrado
- Pastorals: Bernardo G. Gantier Ávila
- UPC: Claudia Jadue Serrano
- Website: sagradocorazon.edu.bo

Sacred Heart College (Spanish: Colegio del Sagrado Corazón), is a private Catholic primary and secondary school, located in Sucre, in the Chuquisaca Department of Bolivia. The co-educational school was founded by the Society of Jesus in 1912.

== Notable alumni ==
- Alejandro Pereyra Doria Medina – poet and filmmaker
- Jaime Paz Zamora – sixtieth President of Bolivia
- Nicolás Tudor – retired professional football player
- Sebastian "Pony" Ortuño – professional football player
- Bernardo Gantier Ávila – Jesuit priest, historian and philosopher
- Guillermo Francovich – playwright, essayist, humorist, and philosopher

== See also ==
- Catholic Church in Bolivia
- Education in Bolivia
- List of Jesuit schools
