= Supreme Court of Justice of Bolivia =

Highest court in Bolivia 1825 to 2012

The Supreme Court of Bolivia (Spanish: Corte Suprema de Justicia de Bolivia) was Bolivia's highest court from 1825 to 2012. It was located in Sucre, 410 kilometres to the south-east of La Paz, Bolivia's capital. The Court was created by the Supreme Decree (Decreto Supremo) of April 27, 1825, which transformed the Royal Audience of Charcas (Audiencia y Cancillería Real de La Plata de los Charcas) of imperial Spain into the Supreme Court of the newly independent country. The Supreme Court of Bolivia was officially inaugurated on July 16, 1827.

== Composition ==
The Supreme Court of Bolivia was composed of 12 ministers (judges) who served 10-year terms after election by the National Congress.

In 1827, Manuel María Urcullo became the first President of the Supreme Court of Bolivia. He was joined by Ministers (Judges) Mariano Guzmán, Juan de la Cruz Monje y Ortega, and Casimiro Olañeta. The following individuals were among the 56 ministers that served as the court's president:

- José María Serrano
- Casimiro Olañeta
- José María Dalence
- Manuel Sánchez de Velasco
- Pantaleón Dalence
- Belisario Boeto
- Luis Paz
- Ángel Sandóval
- Mario C. Araoz
- José Torrico Sierra
- Manuel Durán Padilla
- Raúl Romero Linares
- Remberto Prado Montaño
- Édgar Oblitas Fernández
- Óscar Hassenteufel Salazar
- Eduardo Rodríguez Veltzé
- Héctor Sandóval Parada

== Abolition ==
The court was superseded in January 2012 by the Supreme Court of Justice under the 2009 constitution.

== See also ==
- Supreme Court of Justice (Bolivia)
