= Maximiliano Dávila =

Bolivian anti-drug officer and drug trafficker (born 1964)

Maximiliano Dávila (b. October 20, 1964) also known as "Macho" is a former anti-drugs chief in Bolivia under Evo Morales. He was extradited to the United States to face drug trafficking charges. His extradition was finalized on 12 December 2024. Colonel Dávila was formerly national director of the Special Force to Fight Drug Trafficking (FELCN). He was arrested in Villazón on 22 January 2022 for links to drug trafficking and legitimization of illicit profits.

== See also ==
- Illegal drug trade in Latin America
