= Diego Ávila =

Bolivian politician (born 1961)

Diego Ávila Navajas
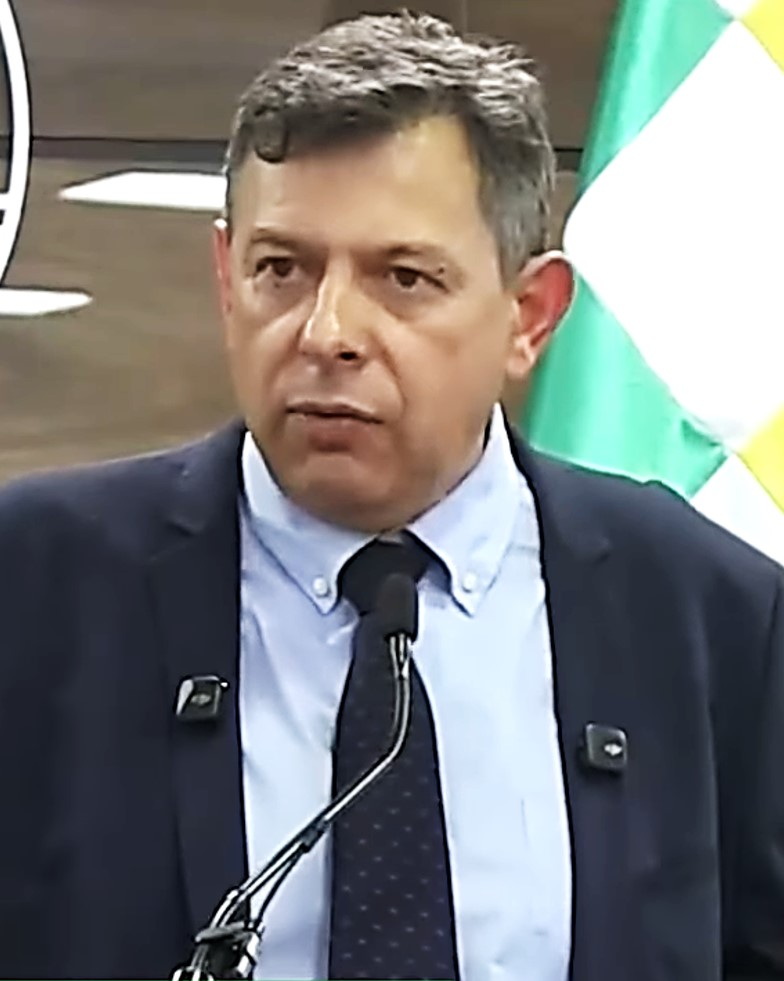

President of the Chamber of Senators
- Incumbent
- Assumed office 6 November 2025
- Preceded by: Andrónico Rodríguez

Member of the Chamber of Senators for Tarija Department
- Incumbent
- Assumed office 6 November 2025

Personal details
- Born: Diego Esteban Mateo Ávila Navajas; 1961 (age 64–65) Tarija, Tarija Department, Bolivia
- Party: Christian Democratic Party
- Spouse: Cecilia Zales
- Children: 3
- Education: Juan Misael Saracho Autonomous University
- Occupation: Politician, economist

Diego Ávila (born 1961 in Tarija) is a Bolivian economist and politician who has been serving as President of the Senate of Bolivia since November 6, 2025.
