= Andrónico Rodríguez =

Bolivian politician (born 1988)

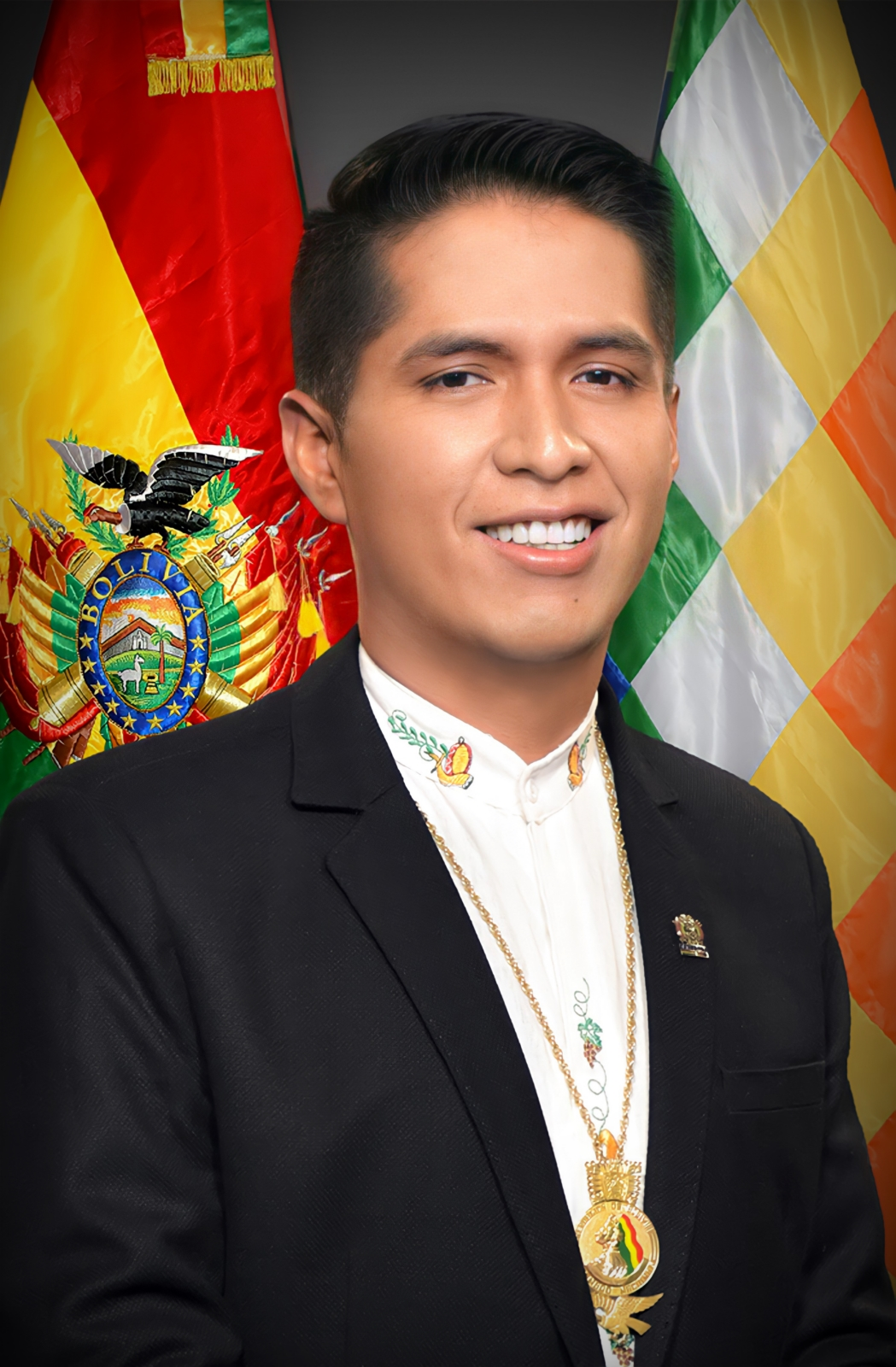
- Official portrait, 2020

President of the Senate
- In office 4 November 2020 – 6 November 2025
- Preceded by: Eva Copa
- Succeeded by: Diego Ávila

Senator for Cochabamba
- In office 3 November 2020 – 6 November 2025
- Substitute: Dilma Cabrera
- Preceded by: Efraín Chambi

Vice President of the Six Federations of the Tropic of Cochabamba
- Incumbent
- Assumed office 28 September 2018
- President: Evo Morales
- Preceded by: Luis Veizaga

Personal details
- Born: Andrónico Rodríguez Ledezma; 11 November 1988 (age 37) Sacaba, Cochabamba, Bolivia
- Party: Independent (since 2025)
- Other political affiliations: Movement for Socialism (2006–2025); Popular Alliance (since 2025)
- Education: Higher University of San Simón
- Occupation: Political scientist; politician; trade unionist

Andrónico Rodríguez Ledezma (born 11 November 1988) is a Bolivian cocalero activist, political scientist, politician, and trade unionist who served as president of the Senate from 2020 to 2025. He served as senator for Cochabamba. Rodríguez's lengthy career in the cocalero union hierarchy saw him serve as general secretary of the 21 September Workers' Center from 2015 to 2016 and as executive of the Mamoré Bulo Bulo Federation from 2016 to 2018, in addition to a multitude of other minor positions. He has served as vice president of the Coordination Committee of the Six Federations of the Tropic of Cochabamba since 2018.

He ran for President of Bolivia in the 2025 Bolivian general election for the Popular Alliance, placing fourth.

== Early life and career ==
Of Quechua descent, Andrónico Rodríguez was born on 11 November 1988 in Sacaba, Cochabamba, the second-youngest of four children born to Carlos Rodríguez and Sinforosa Ledezma. From first to third grade, Rodríguez attended the Don Bosco de Melga School in Sacaba, later emigrating with his family to Entre Ríos in the coca-growing tropics of Cochabamba. He completed secondary education in the city, graduating from the José Carrasco School in 2006 and fulfilling mandatory military service in the "Colonel Ladislao Cabrera" 33rd Infantry Regiment. Rodríguez's upbringing was heavily influenced by the political activities of his parents; his father was a prominent peasant leader among the cocalero growers, while his mother worked as a minute secretary for the Manco Cápac Union at a time when it was uncommon for women to participate in organized labor.

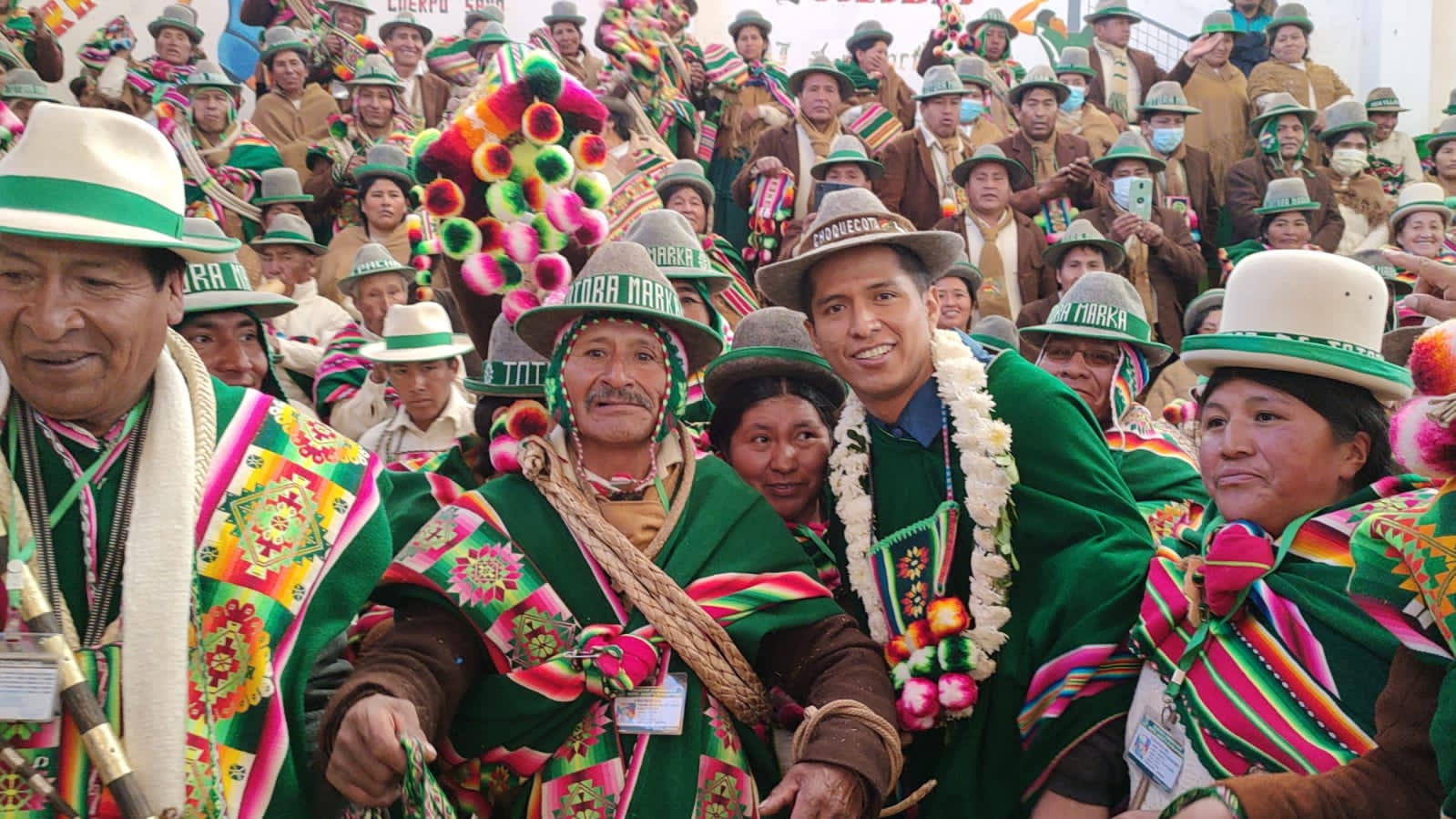
Rodríguez's meteoric rise through trade union hierarchy represented a push toward renewal of leadership among the Chapare coca growers.

As a child, Rodríguez accompanied his father to trade union meetings, becoming proficient in the leadership style of the Chapare coca growers, even participating in cocalero-led strikes and blockades against US-sponsored coca eradication efforts in the region. Rodríguez's experience in these circles motivated him to seek higher education; he attended the Higher University of San Simón (UMSS) in Cochabamba, graduating with a degree in political science in 2012. While still in university, Rodríguez continued his trajectory in the organized labor movement, becoming president of the UMSS's student youth union. Shortly after graduating, he joined the Six Federations of the Tropic of Cochabamba—the largest coca growers' syndicate in the country—where he served as president of the organization's university governing board.

In the ensuing years, Rodríguez rapidly rose through the ranks of cocalero union leadership. In 2013, he replaced his mother as the Manco Cápac Union's minute taker and in 2014, he assumed office as secretary of relations of the 21 September Workers' Center, rising to become the organization's general secretary the following year. In 2016, Rodríguez was elected as executive of the Mamoré Bulo Bulo Federation, where he served for two terms. As a representative of this organization, Rodríguez was presented twice as a candidate for the vice presidency of the Six Federations' Coordination Committee during the body's XIII and XIV congresses. On the first occasion in 2016, he attained 184 votes, placing third, but in 2018, he was elected, attaining the support of 1,020 of the organization's delegates. As vice president, Rodríguez served as second in command under Evo Morales, who had directed the Six Federations as its top leader for over two decades by that point.

With his accession to the vice presidency of the Six Federations, Rodríguez's public profile rose exponentially. Reporting for Infobae, journalist Tuffí Aré noted that "since his election in September 2018, [Rodríguez] almost always [appears] on the right or left side of Evo Morales ... the young character is already the president's most trusted man in his greatest stronghold (the Chapare)". Even as Rodríguez hosted the launch of Morales's third reelection bid, media outlets had already begun to point to him as a possible successor to the country's longest-serving president, with Red UNO even labeling him "the heir" of Morales. Rodríguez, for his part, rejected that label as "monarchical", considering himself "part of the renewal of the [Bolivian socialist movement]" but assuring that "leaderships are built; they are not designated or assumed by decree".

== Chamber of Senators ==
=== Election ===
Rodríguez took his first steps into national politics in 2019, running to represent Cochabamba in the Senate on behalf of Morales's party, the Movement for Socialism (MAS-IPSP). The MAS handily won in the department, attaining nearly sixty percent of the popular vote. Despite the victory, broader allegations of electoral fraud put the national results into question, sparking mass opposition protests that culminated in Morales's resignation and flight from the country just over a month later. In Morales's absence, Rodríguez found himself at the head of the Six Federations, a position he used to direct cocalero-led protests opposing the former president's ouster, though he rejected more radical calls by some compatriots to "raise arms" in a Che-style insurgency.

With new elections scheduled for 2020 and Morales barred from participating, Rodríguez quickly emerged as a viable contender to receive the MAS's nomination for the presidency. Just over a month after Morales's removal, representatives of the MAS's youth wing in Cochabamba put forward Rodríguez as their presidential candidate, with an ensuing opinion poll published by Página Siete demonstrating him leading amid a field of other opposition candidates. In January, the Pact of Unity—a coalition of MAS-aligned trade syndicates—proclaimed former foreign minister David Choquehuanca, "an Aymara comrade", as their preferred presidential candidate, with Rodríguez, "[a] Quechua comrade", presented as his running mate. However, that proposition was rejected by Morales, who considered Rodríguez "too young" to hold the position. The former president instead selected Luis Arce as the MAS's presidential pick, accompanied by Choquehuanca as his running mate, with Morales describing Rodríguez's sidelining as a "sacrifice" the MAS youth would have to make.

Though unable to contest the presidency, Rodríguez remained in the race as a candidate for senator, placing third on the party's electoral list. Following the disqualification of Morales's own senatorial candidacy, Rodríguez was profiled as a possible replacement, better positioning him to win the seat in the event of a close election. Ultimately, cocalero unionist Leonardo Loza was tapped to top the party's list in place of the former president. Nonetheless, the MAS's landslide victory in Cochabamba, even surpassing the previous year's results, ensured that the party won three of the department's four available Senate seats.

=== Tenure ===
With the return to power of the MAS, Rodríguez re-ceded control of the Six Federations to Morales. Though the organization's XV Congress ratified both Morales and Rodríguez, respectively, as president and vice president of the Six Federations, as a senator, Rodríguez's focus shifted to his work in the legislature. Shortly after assuming office, the MAS majority in the Legislative Assembly elected Rodríguez to preside as president of the Senate, a position he was reelected to with minimal resistance in 2021 and with only marginal pushback in 2022. As president, Rodríguez sought to convey a more conciliatory attitude compared to his time as a cocalero activist, pledging to "[generate] spaces for dialogue and consultation [with the opposition], trying at all times to avoid making decisions based on majorities and minorities". "We want [the opposition] to feel that their voice and vote are also very important; they have our respect because they are democratically elected authorities and public servants", he stated.

Given their historic relationship, Rodríguez remained a stalwart Evista—the faction of parliamentarians most closely aligned with Morales—throughout his early senatorial tenure. Though Rodríguez continues to be recognized as one of Morales's most trusted figures within both the legislature and cocalero movement, more recently, he has also been highlighted as an emerging leader of his own Androniquista bloc, a quaternary faction within a MAS internally divided by Arcista, Choquehuanquista, and Evista currents all vying for leadership of the party.

==== Commission assignments ====
- Chamber of Senators Directorate (President: 2020–2025)

== Presidential candidate ==
Rodríguez ran for president of Bolivia in the 2025 elections but failed to advance to a runoff, placing fourth. Running separately from the MAS, he was called a "traitor" by MAS leader and former president Evo Morales, and was pelted with stones by a mob as he cast his vote in the election.

== Electoral history ==
Electoral history of Andrónico Rodríguez
Year	Office	Party	Votes			Result	Ref.
Year	Office	Party	Total	%	P.	Result	Ref.
2019	Senator	Movement for Socialism	659,188	57.52%	1st	Annulled	(Note: Presented on an electoral list. The data shown represents the share of the vote the entire party/alliance received in that constituency.)
2020	Senator	Movement for Socialism	773,386	65.90%	1st	Won	
Source: Plurinational Electoral Organ | Electoral Atlas

Trade union offices
Preceded by Luis Veizaga	Vice President of the Six Federations of the Tropic of Cochabamba; 2018–present	Incumbent
Preceded by Evo Morales	President of the Six Federations of the Tropic of Cochabamba; 2019–2020	Succeeded by Evo Morales
Senate of Bolivia
Preceded by Efraín Chambi	Senator for Cochabamba; 2020–present Served alongside: Leonardo Loza, Patricia Arce, Andrea Barrientos	Incumbent
Preceded by Eva Copa	President of the Senate; 2020–present	Incumbent
