= Chamber of Senators (Bolivia) =

Upper house of the Plurinational Legislative Assembly

Coordinates: 16°29′46″S 68°07′59″W

Chamber of Senators Cámara de Senadores

Type
- Type: Upper house of the Plurinational Legislative Assembly

History
- Founded: 1831

Leadership
- President of the Senate: Diego Ávila, PDC since 6 November 2025

Structure
- Seats: 36
- Political groups: Government (23): PDC (16) (Note: First The People (1); Independent (15)); Unity (7) (Note: National Unity Front (3); Creemos (1); Revolutionary Nationalist Movement (1); Independent (2)); Supported by (13): Libre (12) (Note: Social Democratic Movement (2); Integration Column (1); Independent (9)); APB Súmate (1)

Elections
- Voting system: Party-list proportional representation
- Last election: 17 August 2025
- Next election: By 2030

Meeting place
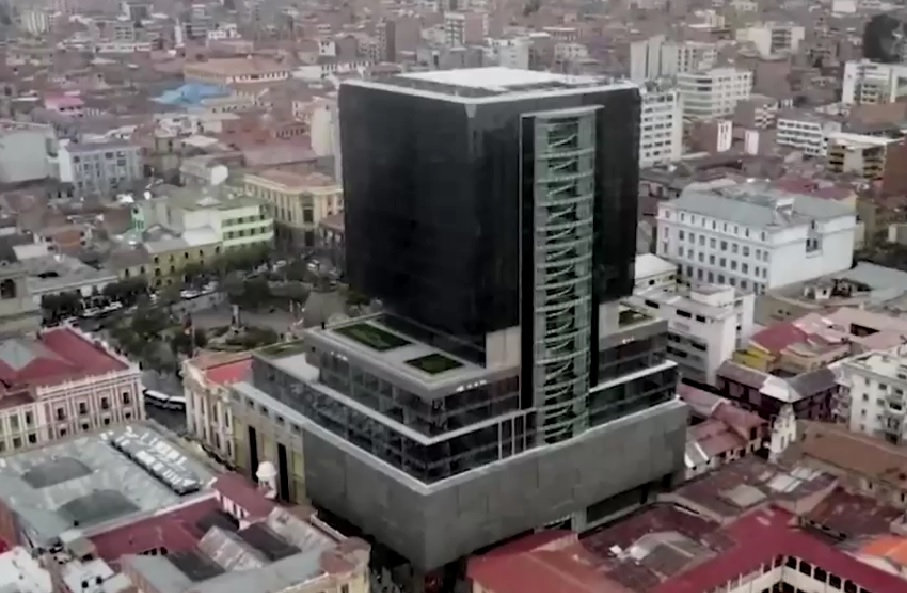
- New Plurinational Assembly Building, La Paz

Website
- https://senado.gob.bo/

The Chamber of Senators (Spanish: Cámara de Senadores), formerly known as the National Senate (Spanish: Senado Nacional), is the upper chamber of the Plurinational Legislative Assembly, the bicameral legislature of Bolivia. Like the lower chamber, the Chamber of Deputies, it meets in La Paz, the seat of government. It is an elected body consisting of 36 members and their substitutes.

The composition and powers of the Senate are established in the Political Constitution of the State and others determined by Bolivian laws. Each of the country's nine departments returns four senators elected by proportional representation (using the D'Hondt method). (From 1985 to 2009, the Senate had 27 seats: three seats per department: two from the party or formula that receives the most votes, with the third senator representing the second-placed party.) Senators are elected from party lists to serve five-year terms, and the minimum age to hold a Senate seat is 35 years.

The Senate was established in the 1831, disestablished later, and re-established in 1878.
