= Plurinationalism =

Coexistence of two or more sealed or preserved national groups within a polity

Plurinationality, plurinational, or plurinationalism is defined as the coexistence of two or more sealed or preserved national groups within a polity (an organized community or body of peoples) in Latin America. In plurinationalism, the idea of nationality is plural, meaning there are many nationals within an organized community or body of peoples. Derived from this concept, a plurinational state is the existence of multiple political communities and constitutional asymmetry. The usage of plurinationality assists in avoiding the division of societies within a state or country. Furthermore, a plurinational democracy recognizes the multiple demoi (common people or populace) within a polity. Reportedly the term has its origin in the Indigenous political movement in Bolivia where it was first heard of in the early 1980s. As of 2025, Bolivia and Ecuador are constitutionally defined as plurinational states. Proposals for plurinationalism have also been heard in Argentina, Chile, Costa Rica, and Guatemala.

Plurinational states are similar to multinational states, but are particularly often advocated for by indigenous peoples.

== Current ==
=== Bolivia ===
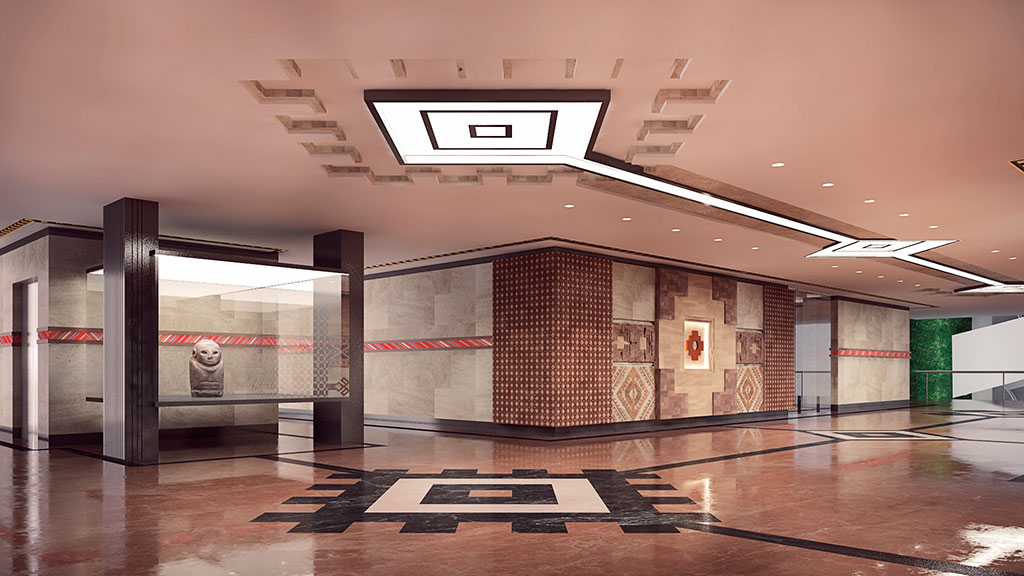
Artwork in the Plurinational Legislative Assembly building, as seen in 2022

In 2009, Bolivia adopted a constitution that renamed the country to the "Plurinational State of Bolivia", as spearheaded by Evo Morales. Formerly, it was called the "Republic of Bolivia". Later, in 2010, Morales proclaimed January 22nd to be "Plurinational State Day", an annual holiday; it coincides with the day Morales took power in 2006.

=== Ecuador ===
In September 2008, Rafael Correa introduced a new constitution that described Ecuador as a "Plurinational and Intercultural State". The new constitution also recognized 11 indigenous groups within the country. The concept of Ecuador becoming a plurinational state was previously proposed in 1988.

== Proposed ==
=== Argentina ===
Since 1986, Argentina has been home to an annual meeting for activists to discuss gender-based inequality. In 2022, the name was changed from the "National Women's Meeting" to the "Plurinational Meeting" (though two events, one under each name, were held that year). In 2023, only the "Plurinational Meeting" was held, which was in the city of Bariloche.

=== Chile ===
Map of indigenous groups in Chile

In Chile constitutional plurinationalism has been a topic of debate. Plurinationalism was not a concept in the constitutional reforms proposed by Michelle Bachelet's second government (2014–2018), yet the proposed reforms included recognition of Chile's indigenous peoples. The 2022 proposed Political Constitution of the Republic of Chile defined Chile as "plurinational", however this proposal was rejected by a large margin in September 2022. Prior to the dismissal of the proposed constitution the issue of pluranationalism was noted by polls and El País as particularly divisive in Chile. The creation of a "plurinational region" in southern Chile has been proposed by some scholars and activists as a solution to the Mapuche conflict.

Plurinationalism has been criticized by José Rodríguez Elizondo as being used to advance Bolivian claims against Chile for sovereign access to the Pacific Ocean.

=== Costa Rica ===
In August 2014, lawmakers in Costa Rica approved a first round vote for a bill that would describe the country as "multiethnic and plurinational" within the constitution of Costa Rica.

=== Guatemala ===
In Guatemala, plurinationalism has been championed by Comité de Desarrollo Campesino and the Maya Waqib’ Kej National Convergence. In the Agreement on Identity and Rights of Indigenous Peoples, the government of Guatemala committed to reforms to recognize the Maya peoples, the Garifuna, and the Xinca people and also reframe the country in the constitution of Guatemala as being "of national unity, multi-ethnic, multicultural and multilingual". No such reforms have ever happened to date.

== See also ==
- Biculturalism
- Composite nationalism
- Consociationalism
- Ethnic federalism
- Multiculturalism
- Multilateralism
- Multinational state
- National personal autonomy
- Pan-nationalism
- Pillarisation
- Plurinational State of Bolivia
- Transnationalism
- Unitary state
