= Supreme Tribunal of Justice of Bolivia =

Highest court of ordinary jurisdiction in Bolivia

The Supreme Court of Justice (Spanish: Tribunal Supremo de Justicia) is the highest court of ordinary jurisdiction in Bolivia, based in Sucre. Its powers are set out in Articles 181–185 of the 2009 Constitution and the Law of the Judicial Organ (Law 025, promulgated on 24 June 2010). It was first seated on 2 January 2012.

== History ==
The Court was created to supersede the Supreme Court of Bolivia, which operated from 1825 to 2011. It was first seated on 2 January 2012. Due to vacancies on the Court and other problems in its final years, the Supreme Court of Justice inherited a backlog of some 8,800 cases in January 2012, which it was charged with resolving within 36 to 48 months.

== List of presidents ==
- Gonzalo Miguel Hurtado Zamorano (2012–2014)
- Jorge Isaac Von Borries Méndez (2014–2015)
- Pastor Segundo Mamani Villca (2015–2017)
- Jorge Isaac Von Borries Méndez (2017–2018)
- José Antonio Revilla Martínez (2018–present)

== Court ==
The Court is made up of nine members and nine alternates, representing the nine departments of Bolivia, elected in popular, nonpartisan elections to terms of six years. The Plurinational Legislative Assembly preselects up to 36 candidates before the election. Reelection is forbidden.

=== Elected members have included ===
- Maritza Suntura (La Paz)
- Jorge Isaac Von Borries Méndez (Santa Cruz)
- Rómulo Calle Mamani (Oruro)
- Pastor Segundo Mamani Villca (Potosí)
- Antonio Guido Campero Segovia (Tarija)
- Gonzalo Miguel Hurtado Zamorano (Beni)
- Fidel Marcos Tordoya Rivas (Cochabamba)
- Rita Susana Nava Durán (Chuquisaca)
- Norka Natalia Mercado Guzmán (Pando)

=== Elected alternates have included ===
- William Alave (La Paz)
- María Arminda Ríos García (Santa Cruz)
- Ana Adela Quispe Cuba (Oruro)
- Elisa Sánchez Mamani (Potosí)
- Carmen Núñez Villegas (Tarija)
- Silvana Rojas Panoso (Beni)
- María Lourdes Bustamante (Cochabamba)
- Javier Medardo Serrano Llanos (Chuquisaca)
- Delfín Humberto Betancour Chinchilla (Pando)
