= Plurinational Constitutional Tribunal =

Bolivian constitutional court

The Plurinational Constitutional Tribunal (Spanish: Tribunal Constitucional Plurinacional) is a national court in Bolivia charged with adjudicating the constitutionality of laws, government power, and treaties in accordance with the country's 2009 Constitution, which created it. The tribunal is headquartered in Sucre and consists of seven members. It was first seated on 2 January 2012. Its powers are set out in Articles 196–204 of the 2009 Constitution, the Law of the Judicial Organ (Law 025, promulgated on 24 June 2010), and Law of the Plurinational Constitutional Tribunal (Law 027, promulgated 6 July 2010). The Plurinational Constitutional Tribunal replaces the Constitutional Court of Bolivia, which operated from 1999 to 2011.

== President and Members ==
The president of the tribunal is Ruddy Jose Flores Monterrey. members of the tribunal are chosen by national nonpartisan election; the first election was held on 16 October 2011. The elected members of the Plurinational Constitutional Tribunal are (in order of total votes received): Gualberto Cusi, Efren Choque, Ligia Velásquez, Mirtha Camacho, Ruddy José Flores Monterrey, Neldy Andrade, Soraida Chávez. The elected alternate members are: Macario Lahor Cortez, Milton Mendoza, Juan Valencia, Blanca Alarcón, Carmen Sandoval, Edith Oroz Carrasco, and Zenón Bacarreza.

== History ==
Prior to the creation of the Constitutional Court in 1999, the Supreme Court of Bolivia was the sole body at the highest level of the country's judiciary.

=== Constitutional Court, 1999–2011 ===
The 1994 reform of Bolivia's Constitution authorized a Constitutional Court. However, the body did not begin to function until 1999. Its procedures were established by Law 1836, the Law of the Constitutional Court passed on 1 April 1998.
