= 2010s in South American history =

The history of South America during the 2010s covers political events which happened in the countries of the region between 2010 and 2019.

== History by country ==
=== Argentina ===
Cristina Fernández de Kirchner won the 2011 general election with 54.11% of the votes, the highest percentage obtained by any presidential candidate since 1983. The 37.3% difference between votes for hers and the runner-up ticket Binner-Morandini was the second largest in the history of Argentine general elections. he established currency controls during her second term, and the country fell into sovereign default in 2014. During her two terms as president, several corruption scandals took place and subsequently her government faced several demonstrations against her rule. She was charged for fraudulent low price sales of dollar futures, and later acquitted.

In 2015, she was indicted for obstructing the investigation into the 1994 AMIA Bombing, after Alberto Nisman's controversial accusation of a purported "pact" (a memorandum) signed between her government and Iran which was supposedly seeking impunity for Iranians involved in the terrorist attack. In 2017, an arrest warrant issued by Claudio Bonadio for Fernández de Kirchner charged her with "treason", but due to her parliamentary immunity, she did not go to prison, and the treason accusation was later dropped, while others charges related to Nisman's accusation remained. In 2018, she was also indicted for corruption on charges alleging that her administration had accepted bribes in exchange for public works contracts.

General elections were held in Argentina on 25 October 2015 to elect the President and National Congress, and followed primary elections which were held on 9 August 2015. A second round of voting between the two leading candidates took place on 22 November, after surprisingly close results forced a runoff. On the first runoff voting ever held for an Argentine Presidential Election, Buenos Aires Mayor Mauricio Macri narrowly defeated Front for Victory candidate and Buenos Aires Province Governor Daniel Scioli with 51.34% of votes. As of 2021, his vote count of nearly 13 million votes makes it the highest number of votes any candidate has ever received in Argentinian history. He took office on 10 December, making him the first freely elected president in almost a century who was not either a Radical or a Peronist.

One of Macri's first economic policies was the removal of currency controls, allowing Argentinians to freely buy and sell foreign currencies on the market. Another early policy was the removal of export quotas and tariffs on corn and wheat. Tariffs on soybeans, Argentina's most lucrative export, were reduced from 35 to 30 percent. And he also ended the national default. Though these measures where applauded by the experts and foreign trade organisations, it failed to produce the economic boom that president Marci had promised during his campaign. Inflation remained high and the overall economic growth was weak.

The 2018 Argentine monetary crisis was a severe devaluation of the Argentine peso, caused by high inflation and steep fall in the perceived value of the currency at the local level as it continually lost purchasing power, along with other domestic and international factors. As a result of it, the presidency of Mauricio Macri requested a loan from the International Monetary Fund.

In the 2019 election Alberto Fernández, Cristina Kirchner's former chief of the cabinet, was elected president. The new Kirchnerist administration immediately refused to take the remaining $11 billion of the loan and argued that that meant that it was no longer obliged to adhere to the IMF conditions. The value of the peso continued to plummet as foreign investors pulled out and the COVID-19 pandemic hit the country in early 2020. Fernández soon brought back some of Cristina Kirchner's more criticised economic policies often expanding on them. This included an extremely tight control on all currency exchange operations with a maximum of exchange of $200 US dollars per month for all citizen and a new 35% tax on all foreign currency exchange operations and froze the official exchange rate. By September 2020 the government had banned most exchange operations.

=== Bolivia ===
The 2011 Bolivian protests were a series of demonstrations by indigenous peoples who opposed the construction of the Villa Tunari – San Ignacio de Moxos Highway through the Isiboro Sécure National Park and Indigenous Territory, the ancestral lands of over 12,000 indigenous residents, from the Chimane, Yuracaré, and Mojeño-Trinitario peoples. The highway project was supported by domestic migrants, highland indigenous groups affiliated with peasant organizations, and the government. During the protests the lowland tribes peoples briefly held Foreign Minister David Choquehuanca in their protests so as to pass through a police roadblock. Defense Minister María Chacón Rendón later resigned as a result of the violent crackdown on protests on 24 September that caused four deaths; due to the adverse reaction to the government crackdown Interior Minister Sacha Llorenty also resigned.

In April 2013, the Supreme Court ruled that the first term of President Evo Morales did not count towards constitutional term limits as the constitution of Bolivia had since been amended. On 20 May, Vice President Alvaro Garcia Linera signed a bill into law in the presence of MPs, members of the armed forces and Movement for Socialism representatives. He said: "President Evo Morales is constitutionally permitted to run for re-election in 2015." This was despite Morales not having made an announcement to run. Unnamed opposition leaders said they would appeal the ruling in trying to overturn it. He was re-elected in the 2014 Bolivian general election. A constitutional referendum was held on Sunday, 21 February 2016. The proposed constitutional amendments would have allowed the president and vice president to run for a third consecutive term under the 2009 Constitution (which would be a fourth consecutive term, including his pre-2009 term). The referendum was voted down by a 51.3% majority.

In September 2017, the Movement for Socialism applied to the Plurinational Constitutional Court to abolish term limits. In November the court ruled in favour of their abolition, citing the American Convention on Human Rights. The ruling allowed Morales to run for re-election in the 2019 elections. Disputes over the transparency and legitimacy of the elections prompted weeks of widespread protests in Bolivia after incumbent President Evo Morales was declared the winner with 47.08% of the vote; because this was greater than ten-point margin over his nearest competitor, Carlos Mesa, this was enough for Morales to be announced as a winner without a run-off second-round vote.

Following protests, as well as calls for a second-round election from several foreign countries, Morales agreed on 10 November to hold new elections, at a date to be determined. On the same day, Morales and his vice president, Álvaro García Linera, were forced to resign from office after losing support from the police and military. Furthermore, the President of the Senate and the President of the Chamber of Deputies – both party allies of Morales, also resigned on the same day, thus exhausting the constitutional line of succession. As a result, the second vice president of the Senate, Jeanine Áñez of the opposition Democrat Social Movement, assumed the interim presidency of Bolivia on 12 November 2019. Due to the annulment of the 2019 elections, MAS retained their supermajority of more than two-thirds in both chambers in opposition to the government, although they would lose this in the 2020 elections.

=== Brazil ===
The 2013 protests in Brazil were public demonstrations in several Brazilian cities. The demonstrations were initially organized to protest against increases in bus, train, and metro ticket prices in some Brazilian cities, but grew to include other issues such as the high corruption in the government and police brutality used against some demonstrators. By mid-June, the movement had grown to become Brazil's largest since the 1992 protests against former President Fernando Collor de Mello.

In February 2014, an investigation by Brazilian Federal Police called "Operation Car Wash" implicated the state-owned energy company Petrobras at the center of what became the largest corruption scandal in Brazil's history. In 2015 and 2016, a series of protests in Brazil denounced corruption and the government of President Dilma Rousseff, triggered by revelations that numerous politicians allegedly accepted bribes connected to contracts at Petrobras between 2003 and 2010 and connected to the Workers' Party, while Rousseff chaired the company's board of directors.

On 3 December 2015, impeachment proceedings against Rousseff were officially accepted by the Chamber of Deputies. On 12 May 2016, the Federal Senate temporarily suspended Rousseff's powers and duties for up to six months or until the Senate reached a verdict: to remove her from office if found guilty or to acquit her from the crimes charged. Vice President Michel Temer, of the Brazilian Democratic Movement Party, assumed her powers and duties as Acting President of Brazil during the suspension. On 31 August 2016, the Senate voted 61–20 in favor of impeachment, finding Rousseff guilty of breaking budgetary laws and removing her from office. Accordingly, Temer was sworn in as the 37th president of Brazil. Temer was himself accused by an Odebrecht executive of soliciting campaign donations in 2014 for his party.

Temer, whose age of 75 at inauguration made him the oldest to ever take office, broke sharply with his predecessor's policies and amended the constitution to freeze public spending. He was extraordinarily unpopular, reaching an approval rating of 7% versus 76% in favor of his resignation. Despite mass demonstrations against his rule, including a 2017 general strike and a 2018 truck drivers' strike, Temer refused to step down and served the duration of his term in office. Due to being convicted of breaking campaign finance laws, Temer was ineligible to run in 2018.

The candidacy of Jair Bolsonaro, a controversial federal deputy from Rio de Janeiro known for his far-right politics and defense of the former Brazilian military dictatorship, overshadowed other conservative candidates. The campaign was marked by political violence, with Bolsonaro being a victim of a stabbing attack at a campaign rally in Minas Gerais In the first round of the election, Bolsonaro received approximately 46% of the vote to Haddad's 29%, with Ciro coming in third place with over 12% of the vote. In the second round, Bolsonaro defeated Haddad by approximately ten percentage points, with the deputy receiving over 55% of the vote to less than 45% for Haddad. Bolsonaro took office on 1 January 2019 as President of Brazil.

The presidency of Dilma Rousseff began on 1 January 2011 with Dilma Vana Rousseff's inauguration as president after defeating PSDB candidate José Serra in the 2010 elections, and ended with her impeachment on 31 August 2016, already in her second term.

The period was historic because it was the first time a woman had held the Presidency of the Republic in Brazil. Initially, the government had 37 ministries in the first term and 39 in the second term, the largest number of ministries since redemocratization in 1985.

In her first months in office, Dilma contradicted the desire of sectors of her own party to regulate the press and declared that "a free media is essential for democracy". Dilma's second term was marked by a serious economic and political crisis in the country, with GDP per capita shrinking by more than 9% between 2014 and 2016. In the year of her impeachment, the unemployment rate stood at 12%, while in 2010 it was 6.7%. Even after her departure, the unemployment rate remained in the double digits for more than five years, falling only in March 2022, during Jair Bolsonaro's presidency.

The Democracy Index, drawn up annually by the British magazine The Economist, ranked Brazil as the 47th most democratic country in the world in 2010, the beginning of the presidency of Dilma; in the 2013 ranking, it appeared in 44th place. According to the survey, 11% of the world's population lived in "complete democracies", which was not the case in Brazil, still considered an "imperfect democracy".

Michel Temer's tenure as the 37th president of Brazil began on 12 May 2016 and ended on 1 January 2019.

It began when Temer as vice-president, temporarily assumed the powers and duties of the presidency after the temporary removal of president Dilma Rousseff's powers and duties, as a result of the acceptance of the impeachment process by the Federal Senate. Once the process was concluded, on 31 August 2016, Temer assumed the presidency (upon Rousseff's removal from office). He was succeeded by Jair Bolosonaro.

Temer became president in the midst of a serious economic crisis in the country. At his inauguration, he stated that his government would be a reformist one. During his administration, several economic measures were approved, such as the control of public spending, through Constitutional Amendment No. 95, which imposed limits on future federal government spending, the 2017 labour reform and the Outsourcing Law. There was also a proposed social security reform, which the government failed to push through. Changes were made in the social field, such as the completion and inauguration of part of the São Francisco River transposition project, the reform of high school education and the establishment of the National Common Curriculum Base.

While Temer was in office, the involvement of allies, ministers and the president himself in corruption scandals caused controversy. Despite this, the government managed to maintain a solid base in Congress, which made it possible to approve reforms "necessary to stimulate economic growth", according to him. However, the administration was accused of backtracking by organizations and experts, particularly in the social and environmental areas and in the indigenous issues. According to opinion polls by different institutes, the government had the lowest popular approval rating in the country's history.

According to data from the Central Bank, the IBGE, Caged and the São Paulo Stock Exchange, during his two years in office, the government reduced the interest rate from 14.25% to 6.50% a year; inflation fell from 9.32% to 2.76%; the unemployment rate from 11.2% to 13.1%; the dollar rose from 3.47 to 3.60 reais and the Bovespa index rose from 48,471 points to 85,190 points. Temer benefited from the improvement in his government's economic indices to record a video talking about good news in the economy and comparing it to the economic data from the Dilma government. "With these resources, the government will close the accounts for 2018 and guarantee compliance with the so-called golden rule," said Temer, adding that "Petrobras reached the highest market value in its history, 312.5 billion reais" and that Brazil "was considered by 2,500 top executives from around the world to be the second main destination for foreign investment in the main industrial sectors". Temer also said that in 2017, the Correios made a profit of 667 million reais. "This, by the way, is the first profit since 2013, when the company began to record consecutive losses until 2016," said the president.

=== Chile ===
The 2011–2013 Chilean protests were a series of student-led protests across Chile, demanding a new framework for education in the country, including more direct state participation in secondary education and an end to the existence of profit in higher education. Beyond the specific demands regarding education, there is a feeling that the protests reflect a "deep discontent" among some parts of society with Chile's high level of inequality. Protests have included massive non-violent marches, but also a considerable amount of violence on the part of a side of protestors as well as riot police.

In the 2013 Chilean general election, former president Michelle Bachelet fell short of the absolute majority needed for an outright win. In the runoff election, held on 15 December, she beat former senator and Minister of Labor Evelyn Matthei with over 62% of the vote, with turnout significantly lower than in the first round. In the parliamentary elections, the New Majority coalition (backing Bachelet's candidacy) won back control of both chambers of Congress, winning 12 of the 20 contested seats in the Senate, for a total of 21 out of 38 total seats, and 67 of the 120 seats in the Chamber of Deputies. Though Bachelet's New Majority gained a majority of seats in the legislature, it failed to gain a four-sevenths majority required to pass legislation for her cornerstone education reform, which was the reason for mass mobilisation amidst the ongoing 2011–13 Chilean student protests. They also failed to get a two-thirds majority to restructure the 1981 constitution of Chile enacted during the Augusto Pinochet regime.

The 2019 Chilean protests were a series of massive demonstrations and severe riots that began in Chile's capital, Santiago, as a coordinated fare evasion campaign by secondary school students which led to spontaneous takeovers of the city's main train stations and open confrontations with the Carabineros de Chile (the national police force). On 18 October, the situation escalated as a group of people began vandalizing city's infrastructure; seizing, vandalizing, and burning down many stations of the Santiago Metro network and disabling them with extensive infrastructure damage, and for a time causing the cessation of the network in its entirety. 81 stations have sustained major damage, including 17 burned down. On the same day, President of Chile Sebastián Piñera announced a state of emergency, authorizing the deployment of Chilean Army forces across the main regions to enforce order and prevent the destruction of public property, and invoked before the courts the Ley de Seguridad del Estado ("State Security Law") against dozens of detainees. A curfew was declared on 19 October in the Greater Santiago area.

In the following days, protests and riots expanded to other Chilean cities, including Concepción, San Antonio and Valparaíso. The state of emergency was extended to the Concepción Province, all Valparaíso Region (except Easter Island and Juan Fernández Archipelago) and the cities of Antofagasta, Coquimbo, Iquique, La Serena, Rancagua, Valdivia, Osorno, and Puerto Montt. The protests have been considered the "worst civil unrest" having occurred in Chile since the end of Augusto Pinochet's military dictatorship due to the scale of damage to public infrastructure, the number of protesters, and the measures taken by the government. Widespread looting has occurred at shops and businesses. On 15 November 2019, Chile's National Congress signed an agreement to hold a national referendum that would rewrite the constitution if it were to be approved.

=== Colombia ===
In 2010, Juan Manuel Santos won the presidential election as the protégé of his predecessor Álvaro Uribe Vélez. However, some months after Santos' possession, Uribe became his strongest opponent, who also founded, three years later, the opposition party Democratic Center. This rivalry determined both Santos' unpopularity and his near-missed defeat during the presidential election in 2014 before Uribe's protégé Oscar Iván Zuluaga.

On 7 October 2016, Santos was announced as recipient of the Nobel Peace Prize, for his efforts negotiating a peace treaty with the FARC-guerrilla in the country, despite his defeat in the referendum held over the deal, where the "no" campaign led by Uribe's party Democratic Center won. The Colombian government and the FARC signed a revised peace deal on 24 November and sent it to Congress for ratification instead of conducting a second referendum. Both houses of Congress ratified the revised peace accord on 29–30 November 2016, thus marking an end to the conflict.

=== Ecuador ===
Using its own form of 21st century socialism, Rafael Correa's administration increased government spending, reducing poverty, raising the minimum wage and increasing the standard of living in Ecuador. By the end of Correa's tenure, reliance on oil, public expenditures, 2016 earthquakes (more than 650 deaths and damage estimated at the equivalent of about 3% of GDP), and international pressure caused Ecuador's economy to enter a recession, resulting in government spending being slashed.

Lenín Moreno was nominated as the candidate for Correa's PAIS Alliance, a democratic socialist political party, in the 2017 presidential election and won a narrow victory in Ecuador's second round of voting on 2 April 2017. However, after his election Moreno drastically shifted his political stance, distancing himself from Correa's leftist legacy in both domestic and foreign policy.

=== Peru ===
In the general elections held on 10 April 2011 former army officer Ollanta Humala narrowly defeated Keiko Fujimori, daughter of imprisoned former President Alberto Fujimori. Originally and a socialist and left-wing nationalist affiliated with the ethnocacerist movement, he was considered to have shifted towards neoliberal policies and the political centre during his presidency. Humala's unpopular presidency was dominated by corruption scandals surrounding him and his politically influential wife Nadine Heredia. Environmentalists were highly critical of Humala's mining policies, and argued that he reneged on his campaign promise to rein in mining companies. In 2017, Humala was arrested by Peruvian authorities on corruption charges.

On 15 December 2017, the Congress of Peru, which was controlled by the opposition Popular Force, initiated impeachment proceedings against President Pedro Pablo Kuczynski, after he was accused of lying about receiving payments from a scandal-hit Brazilian construction firm Odebrecht in the mid-2000s. However, on 21 December 2017, the Peruvian congress lacked the majority of votes needed to impeach Kuczynski. After further scandals and facing a second impeachment vote, Kuczynski resigned the presidency on 21 March 2018 following the release of videos showing alleged acts of vote buying, presenting his resignation to the Council of Ministers. He was succeeded as president by his First Vice President Martín Vizcarra. On 28 April 2019, Kuczynski was sentenced to three years of house arrest due to poor health while under investigation for allegedly taking bribes from Odebrecht.

=== Paraguay ===
Fernando Lugo, elected President of Paraguay in 2008, was impeached and removed from office by the Congress of Paraguay in June 2012. On 21 June the Chamber of Deputies voted 76 to 1 to impeach Lugo, and the Senate removed him from office the following day, by 39 votes to 4, resulting in Vice President Federico Franco, who had broken with Lugo, becoming president. A number of Latin American governments declared the proceeding was effectively a coup d'état. Lugo himself formally accepted the impeachment, but called it a "parliamentary coup".

On 31 March 2017, a series of protests began in Paraguay, during which demonstrators set fire to the Congress building. The demonstrations occurred in response to a constitutional amendment that would permit President Horacio Cartes to run for re-election, a move described by the opposition as "a coup". One protester was killed and several protesters, politicians and journalists, as well as police, were reported injured, including one lower-house deputy who had to undergo surgery after being injured by rubber bullets. On 17 April, President Cartes announced that he was resigning from any possible candidacy for a second presidential term. On 26 April, the Chamber of Deputies of Paraguay rejected the proposed constitutional amendment for presidential re-election.

=== Uruguay ===
José Mujica took office as president on 1 March 2010. He was described as "the world's humblest head of state" due to his austere lifestyle and his donation of around 90 percent of his $12,000 monthly salary to charities that benefit poor people and small entrepreneurs.

In June 2012, Mujica's government made a controversial move to legalize state-controlled sales of marijuana in Uruguay in order to fight drug-related crimes and health issues, and stated that they would ask global leaders to do the same. Mujica said that by regulating Uruguay's estimated $40 million-a-year marijuana business, the state would take it away from drug traffickers, and weaken the drug cartels. The state would also be able to keep track of all marijuana consumers in the country and provide treatment to the most serious abusers, much like that which is done with alcoholics. Mujica also passed a same-sex marriage law and legalized abortion for women.

Tabaré Vázquez took office on 1 March 2015, succeeding Mujica. On 9 September 2017, his running mate and Vice President Raúl Fernando Sendic resigned after he was accused allegedly of misusing public funds while heading state oil company Ancap. Sendic's bad image began with a scandal over his non-existent degree in Human Genetics in 2016, and deeply damaged the image of Vázquez and his government which already suffered from historically low approval.

=== Venezuela ===
After Chávez's death was announced on 5 March 2013, Maduro assumed the presidency. A special presidential election was held in 2013, which Maduro won with 50.62% of the vote as the United Socialist Party of Venezuela candidate. Shortages in Venezuela and decreased living standards led to protests beginning in 2014 that escalated into daily marches nationwide, repression of dissent and a decline in Maduro's popularity. According to The New York Times, Maduro's administration was held "responsible for grossly mismanaging the economy and plunging the country into a deep humanitarian crisis" and attempting to "crush the opposition by jailing or exiling critics, and using lethal force against antigovernment protesters".

An opposition-led National Assembly was elected in 2015 and a movement toward recalling Maduro began in 2016, which was ultimately cancelled by Maduro's government; Maduro maintained power through the Supreme Tribunal, the National Electoral Council and the military. The Supreme Tribunal removed power from the elected National Assembly, resulting in a constitutional crisis and protests in 2017. On 1 April 2017, the Supreme Tribunal partially reversed its decision. As a response to the protests, Maduro called for a rewrite of the constitution, and the Constituent Assembly of Venezuela was elected in 2017, under what many—including Venezuela's chief prosecutor Luisa Ortega and Smartmatic, the company that ran the voting machines—considered irregular voting conditions; all of its members were pro-Maduro.

On 20 May 2018, presidential elections were called prematurely; (Note: The original electoral date was December 2018 but was pulled ahead to 22 April and then pushed back to 20 May.) opposition leaders had been jailed, exiled or forbidden to run, there was no international observation, and tactics to suggest voters could lose their jobs or social welfare if they did not vote for Maduro were used. Multiple nations did not recognize the Constituent Assembly election or the validity of Maduro's 2018 reelection; the Canadian, Panamanian, and the United States governments sanctioned Maduro. Amid widespread condemnation, President Maduro was sworn in on 10 January 2019, and the president of the National Assembly, Guaidó, was declared interim president on 23 January 2019 by the National Assembly. Following a failed military uprising on 30 April 2019, representatives of Guaidó and Maduro began mediation, with the assistance of the Norwegian Centre for Conflict Resolution.

== See also ==
- 2010s in history
- 2020s in history
