= Pact of Unity =

The Pact of Unity (Spanish: Pacto de Unidad) is an evolving national alliance of Bolivian grassroots organizations in support of indigenous and agrarian rights, land reform, the rewriting of the 1967 constitution through a Constituent Assembly, and a left-indigenous transformation of the Bolivian state. Since 2005, the Pact has been a close ally of Bolivian President Evo Morales, and it forms the nucleus of the National Coordination for Change, a pro-government alliance.

The composition of the Pact of Unity has varied over time, but since 2006 it has generally consisted of five nationwide organizations:

- Unique Confederation of Rural Laborers of Bolivia (CSUTCB)
- National Confederation of Peasant Indigenous Native Women of Bolivia - Bartolina Sisa
- Syndicalist Confederation of Intercultural Communities of Bolivia (CSCIB)
- Confederation of Indigenous Peoples of Bolivia (CIDOB)
- National Council of Ayllus and Markas of Qullasuyu (CONAMAQ)

In 2011, CONAMAQ and CIDOB withdrew from the Pact. Both organizations underwent internal disputes in the years that followed. One faction of each split, aligned with the Morales government, re-joined the Pact in 2013.

== History ==
Coordination among indigenous, campesino, and agrarian movements in Bolivia increased in the 1990s, particularly through collaboration in joint mobilizations and increased cooperation between department-wide organization in Santa Cruz. During the third national indigenous march, five Santa Cruz organizations fused to form the Bloque Oriente (literally, "Eastern Bloc"): Coordinadora de Pueblos Étnicos de Santa Cruz (CPESC), Federación Sindical de Única de Trabajadores Campesinos Santa Cruz Apiagüayki Tumpa (FSUTC-SC), the Movimiento Sin Tierra (MST), the Federación Departamental de Mujeres Campesinas Bartolina Sisa (FDMC-BS), and the Federación Departamental de Colonizadores de Santa Cruz (FDC-SC).

In La Paz, a coalition of grassroots organizations signed the Pact of Unity and Commitment (Spanish: Pacto de Unidad y Compromiso) among campesino, indigenous, and native peoples organizations of Bolivia (Spanish: Pacto de unidad y compromiso entre las organizaciones campesinas, indígenas y pueblos originarios de Bolivia) on March 15, 2002. This document was drafted and issued at the end of a movement summit on the question of constitutional reform. It put forward a demand for a new Constituent Assembly, organized independent of parliament and political parties. Its signers included the Bloque Oriente, CONAMAQ, MST-B, the Departmental Workers Central of Beni, CAOP, and the Bartolina Sisa federations of Santa Cruz, Pando, and Vaca Diez.

In March 2005, an enlarged coalition joined together in advance of the 2005 phase of the Bolivian Gas War. As of that time, the Pact of Unity included earlier pact members—CONAMAQ, MST-B, CPESC, Bloque Oriente; national confederations of prior allies: the Unified Syndical Confederation of Rural Laborers of Bolivia (CSUTCB), Confederación Sindical de Colonizadores de Bolivia (CSCB), Federación Nacional de Mujeres Campesinas de Bolivia Bartolina Sisa (FNMCB-BS); and new social movement allies: Asamblea del Pueblo Guarani (APG), Central de Pueblos Étnicos Mojeños del Beni (CPEMB), Central Departamental de Trabajadores Asalariados del Campo (CDTAC), Bloque de Organizaciones Campesinas e Indígenas del Norte Amazónico de Bolivia (BOCINAB), Comité de Defensa del Río Pilcomayo (CODERIP), Coordinadora de Integración de Organizaciones Campesinas (CIOEC). The Pact of Unity joined in a broader alliance called the Pact for National Sovereignty and Dignity. Its demands included the expulsion of private water company Aguas de Illimani from El Alto, fifty percent royalties on gas exports, indigenous rights, the convening of a Constituent Assembly, rejecting the Free Trade Area of the Americas, and rejecting immunity agreements for United States officials. Besides Unity Pact organizations, the Pact for National Dignity and Sovereignty included the Federation of Neighborhood Councils-El Alto (FEJUVE-El Alto), the Bolivian Workers Center (COB), the Coordinadora for Gas and Life, the Confederation of Rural Teachers of Bolivia, and two political parties: the Movement Towards Socialism and the Pachakuti Indigenous Movement.

In 2011, the divisive controversy over the Villa Tunari – San Ignacio de Moxos Highway through Isiboro Sécure National Park and Indigenous Territory caused a severe dispute within the Pact. CIDOB and CONAMAQ led a national march in defense of Isiboro Sécure, which was temporarily disrupted by national police. When the next meeting of the Pact of Unity was held November 17–19 in Sucre, CONAMAQ and CIDOB were notable by their absence. In December 2011, both CIDOB and CONAMAQ formally withdrew from the Pact of Unity. Senior members of CIDOB critiqued the Pact for deviating from its prior purpose of pressing indigenous rights in the constitution and uniting "only to say yes and submit to the decisions of the government" (in the words of CIDOB President Adolfo Chávez). Representatives of the remaining organizations (sometimes called the "triplets") maintain that CIDOB and CONAMAQ's withdrawal is a temporary decision made by their leadership.
