= Bartolina Sisa Confederation =

Primary union organization of peasant women in Bolivia

- Bartolina Sisa National Confederation of Peasant, Indigenous, and Native Women of Bolivia
- Confederación Nacional de Mujeres Campesinas Indígenas Originarias de Bolivia “Bartolina Sisa”
- Founded: January 1980; 46 years ago
- Headquarters: La Paz, Bolivia
- Location: Bolivia
- Members: over 100,000
- Affiliations: CSUTCB, COB
- Website: http://www.bartolinasisa.org/

The Bartolina Sisa National Confederation of Peasant, Indigenous, and Native Women of Bolivia (Spanish: Confederación Nacional de Mujeres Campesinas Indígenas Originarias de Bolivia "Bartolina Sisa"; CNMCIOB-BS), known informally as the Bartolinas, is the largest women's social movement organization in Bolivia.

The organization was founded as the Bartolina Sisa National Federation of Peasant Women of Bolivia (Spanish: Federación Nacional de Mujeres Campesinas de Bolivia "Bartolina Sisa"; FNMCB-BS) on 10 January 1980. Lead founding members included Irma García, Isabel Juaniquina, Isabel Ortega, and Lucila Mejía, the organization's first executive secretary. Its name refers to Bartolina Sisa, an 18th-century Aymara peasant leader and wife of Túpac Katari, and reflects the strong influence of Katarism in peasant politics. Its current name was adopted during the organization's Organic Congress of 29–30 November 2008, which redefined it as a confederation and adopted the terms "peasant, indigenous, and native" from the text of the new Bolivian constitution.

Their main aims are to organize and facilitate women's participation in national terrain. They achieve these aims by giving indigenous women political, economic, cultural, and social decision making power; unifying peasant women's political, cultural, and social rights under a single framework; and promoting economic development on the basis of traditional peasant Indigenous peoples’ knowledge. Through this work their ultimate mission is the decolonization of women and encouragement of their equal and meaningful participation in protest. The Bartolina Sisa Confederation is a member of the Pact of Unity and the National Coordinator for Change, and is a constituent organization of the Movement Toward Socialism.

The president of the Constituent Assembly in Bolivia, Silvia Lazarte, was elected Executive Secretary at the National level at the 8th national congress in April 1999. In 2020 the confederations executive was Segundina Flores, a former Deputy.
