= 2011 Bolivian Indigenous rights protests =

Protests against Evo Morale's Administration in Bolivia

2011 Bolivian protests
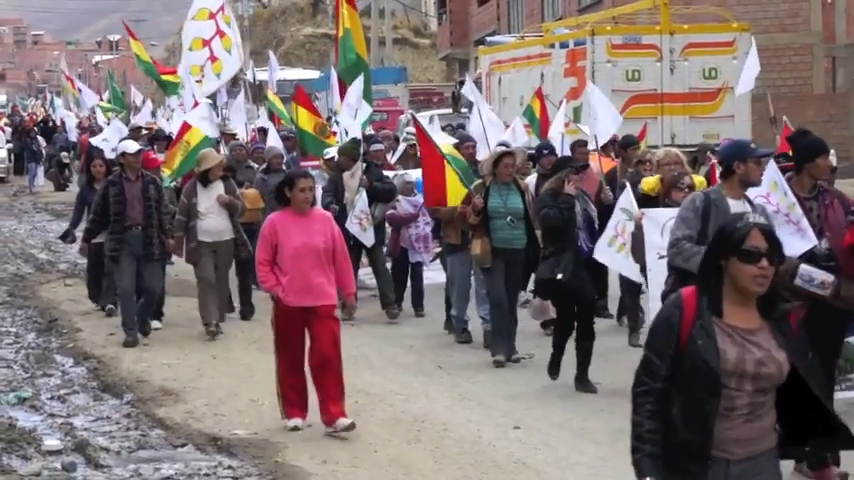
- Date: Mid-August – October 2011 - April – June 2012
- Location: Bolivia
- Caused by: Encroachment of indigenous territory; Fear of internal migration
- Goals: Change of route for proposed highway; resignation of president (after 24 September crackdown)
- Methods: Demonstrations, protest march, hostage taking (alleged)
- Result: Resignation of Defense, Interior and Deputy Interior Ministers; suspension of project

Parties
Government of Bolivia; Highland indigenous migrants	CIDOB; CONAMAQ; Environmentalists

Lead figures
Evo Morales	Adolfo Chávez; Antonio Soto

Number
	~2,000

Casualties and losses
One hostage (released)	Four dead, scores wounded and at least 300 detained or missing

The 2011 Bolivian protests were a series of demonstrations by indigenous peoples who opposed the construction of the Villa Tunari – San Ignacio de Moxos Highway through the Isiboro Sécure National Park and Indigenous Territory, the ancestral lands of over 12,000 indigenous residents, from the Chimane, Yuracaré, and Mojeño-Trinitario peoples. The subcentral TIPNIS, the Confederation of Indigenous Peoples of Bolivia (CIDOB), and the highland indigenous confederation CONAMAQ—supported by other indigenous and environmental groups—organised a march from Trinidad, Beni to the national capital La Paz in opposition to the project, beginning on 15 August 2011.

The highway project was supported by domestic migrants, highland indigenous groups affiliated with peasant organizations, and the government. During the protests the lowland tribes peoples briefly held Foreign Minister David Choquehuanca in their protests so as to pass through a police roadblock. Defense Minister María Chacón Rendón later resigned as a result of the violent crackdown on protests on 24 September that caused four deaths; due to the adverse reaction to the government crackdown Interior Minister Sacha Llorenty also resigned. On 19 October the protest march reached the capital city of La Paz amid welcomes from the local population and the Information Minister, as security services were withdrawn from their posts guarding the presidential palace. Protests were held in the national capital La Paz, Cochabamba, Santa Cruz, Yucumo, Rurrenabaque, Trinidad, San Antonio, El Alto and Beni.

In April 2012, a new round of protest marches commences in protest against Morales' continued support for the project.

== Background ==
Despite the election of the first ever indigenous president, Evo Morales, indigenous groups have intermittently continued social protests. In 2008, the predominantly European-origin residents of Bolivia's eastern lowland provinces were successfully resisted by the indigenous groups with the solidarity of highland indigenous groups, though it was after violent protests and deaths.

In 2009, the European-Bolivians also tried to protest Morales' attempts at a new constitution that would increase his term limit. However, a compromise that Morales would not run again led to the creation of a new constitution and the establishment of the Plurinational State of Bolivia. Another provision in the new constitution explicitly referred to the defence of the communal rights of the indigenous communities over their traditional tribal lands. However, a regional election that was won by right-wing party was widely celebrated in that part of Bolivia.

In 1990, Morales, as a union leader in the March for Territory and Dignity, had helped create the indigenous autonomy territories. Morales' primary support base is from the coca-growing Aymara and Quechua tribes in the Chapare region. However, in the part of the Amazon Basin where the highway was scheduled to be built, they are known as "colonists" for having migrated to the region. He came to power on the promise of ending discrimination and marginalisation.

Morales said that the US$420 million, 300-kilometre (190 mi) highway project, funded by Brazil in the quest to access the Pacific Ocean, would be a principal part of his infrastructure plan. The highway would connect the agricultural region of Beni with the commercial crossroad of Cochabamba; it would also reduce travel time by half as it short-circuits Santa Cruz, a region that had opposed Morales' presidency. In June, he said that the highway would go ahead "whether they (indigenous groups) like it or not". In response, indigenous leaders, who had in the past been supportive of Morales, reacted adversely; this caused a rift within the ruling Movement Toward Socialism party. Some MPs of the party expressed their support for the protesters, as well as the demands of the roughly 12,000 residents of the Isiboro Secure Indigenous Territory and National Park (which is both a national park and an autonomous territory that is under the auspices of the Yuracare, Moxeno and Chiman indigenous peoples) in the Amazon Basin, which is home to 64 indigenous tribes and where the highway was proposed to be built.

A study conducted prior to the protests estimated that 64 percent of the national park would be deforested in less than 18 years. Furthermore, the highway could lead to land grabs by loggers and cocaleros. The protesters also feared an "invasion" of migrants following the construction of the highway.

=== Parallels ===
Similarly, prior to the victory of left-wing candidate Ollanta Humala in Peru's election, several thousand indigenous Quechua tribes people blocked the border with Bolivia (whose post-colonial boundaries divide the Quechua tribes into at least two states) in protest against mining contracts given to a Canadian company that they said would poison Lake Titicaca, their principal source of water. They too vowed to continue their protests after Humala's election.

Similarly, in March 2012, protesters in Ecuador began a cross-country march against fellow pink tide President Rafael Correa's policies for mining in the Amazon.

== Goals ==
In addition to the cancellation of the highway project, protesters also demanded the resignation of President Evo Morales following a bloody crackdown on protesters. Other demands by the protesters also included a cessation of oil and gas extraction projects in the Aguaragüe National Park and Integrated Management Natural Area, as well as compensation for the effects of global warming.

== Protest marches ==
The initial protest started in mid-August as activists from the Amazon Basin left Trinidad in the hope of reaching the national capital of La Paz to protest Morales' initiative. More than 1,700 protesters, including pregnant women and children, joined the 375-mile trek. Following a march of over a month, the protest group reached the outskirts of Yucumo, a predominantly pro-government town, where pro- and anti-government groups clashed.

Following more than a week of protests, the marchers staged a larger demonstration in which they sought to circumvent a police crackdown by forcefully holding Foreign Minister David Choquehuanca to march with them. A group of female marchers grabbed Choquehuanca and insisted that he lead them through the police cordon that separated them from pro-government marchers so they could continue their journey to La Paz. Several government officials, including Minister of Interior Sacha Llorenty and Minister of Transparency Nardi Suxo, said that this was a "kidnapping" (secuestro), but Choquehuanca steadfastly refused to label it as such, saying that "the sisters and [female] comrades grabbed me, surely they had thought that they would pass that police encirclement with the Chancellor; I was not insulted, nor mistreated, but yes, they obliged me to walk." Prosecutor Patrica Santos, who was charged with investigating the events, received Choquehuanca's testimony to this effect on 21 November.

On 25 September, the protesters' arrival in the Yucumo region led to police firing tear gas and detaining some protesters; it also led to several injuries and four deaths. Maria Carvajal, a rights activist, said that the police attacked the protest camp with "extreme violence" and that she "could not believe what was happening". The next day, protesters returned and set barricades on fire at the airport runway in Rurrenabaque in order to secure the release of 300 protesters who had been arrested, according to Mayor Yerko Nunez. Protests also occurred in the capital city of La Paz as riot police organized a security cordon around the Quemada government building, where thousands of protesters denounced the crackdown. Solidarity protests were also held in Cochabamba (the scene of similar anti-government riots prior to Morales taking office, which some said were instrumental in leading the social movements that brought Morales to power), with student protests and members of the Aymara and Quechua indigenous peoples beginning a hunger strike. Other protests were also held in the Beni province and in Santa Cruz.

On 28 September, several thousands again gathered to protest against the government crackdown and to defend the national park. The Central Obrera Boliviana called for a 24-hour general strike; though some businesses stayed open, schools and medical services were affected. The strikers marched outside the capital of La Paz to El Alto chanting "Evo is a fascist!" and "Evo is a lackey of Brazilian companies," miners burnt sticks of dynamite and the marches caused traffic delays. The protesters were said to be encouraged by the solidarity protests in the urban areas and the general strike; they then said that the protest march would continue. One protest leader, Mariana Guasania, told a group of about 200 protesters in Rurrenabaque: "Long live this historic march...the march goes on" in the quest to see a law that would guarantee the highway would bypass the national park. On 30 September, over 10,000 protesters in La Paz carried banners that criticized Morales on the grounds that his government was "the worst and it should go because it attacked human beings, the indigenous compatriots who had given it their support, and now it's turned its back on them;" they also questioned his commitment to the rights of the indigenous peoples and the protection of "Mother Earth", that he had advocated during his election campaign. As of 30 September, protesters said they would further their protests even though Morales said that "the roads construction is suspended until the national debate is over."

Protests resumed over the weekend of 1 October, with about 1,000 demonstrators continuing the unfinished stretch of 250 km to La Paz. Adolfo Chávez, an indigenous leader, said that "We have resumed the march and our intention is not to clash with anybody. Instead of accusing the indigenous people, what the government should do is resolve the problem of the road once and for all."

On 19 October, almost 2,000 protesters reached the capital city of La Paz. Despite the suspension of the project the protest march continued in order to see the project canceled. Fifteen hundred protesters started the march to be joined by up to tens of thousands of protesters, according to the Al Jazeera English. As the protesters entered the city, people in La Paz cheered them by waving Bolivian flags and white handkerchiefs. As a gesture of goodwill both police and riot control vehicles were withdrawn from their positions outside the presidential palace, while the information minister offered an official welcome to the protesters.

=== 2012 ===
Several hundred indigenous protesters began a 580-kilometer march from the eastern Amazon lowlands region to the legislative capital of La Paz in opposition to Morales' continued support for the highway project. The organizers said that if the government's support for the project continued there would be more violence. Simultaneously there were indigenous protests in Peru.

== Response ==
Morales' immediate reaction to the protests was to call the marchers "enemies of the nation." He also sought to discredit them by saying they had been brainwashed by NGOs and saying the march was yet another attempt by the U.S.A. at expanding their imperialism.

Morales had said that a referendum would be held over the project in the Cochabamba and Beni departments following protests by farmers from the 16 tribes of the national park in San Antonio. He has also previously said that he would work to ensure illegal settlers in the national park were evicted. On 28 September, following the march to El Alto, he said that "we ask for forgiveness – forgive me. [The crackdown] was not an instruction by the president. No one in the government would have thought such an attack could happen to our indigenous brothers." He also called the protests a "wake-up call." However, Rosario Barradas, a leader of the Conference of Indigenous People, responded to the statement saying that "we don't believe what he says anymore. We are reorganising to continue this. We are not going to stop until this is solved." Despite the concessions, Jhonny an Osomomo chief said that: "If they build it correctly, so that it skirts the reserve, a road could be a good thing. For example, we have very few health supplies and doctors here and it could help keep our children healthy."

In response to the crackdown on 25 September, government officials, including Defense Minister María Chacón Rendón and the ombudsman, as well as opposition figures criticised the government's reaction. Chacon said that "This is not the way! We agreed to do things differently." She also announced her resignation. However, Communications Minister Ivan Canelas said that the police had no choice but to respond as they did. "The march [in the Yucumo region] was defused because it had become a source of violence." Morales' Interior Minister Sacha Llorenty, who had come under pressure for his handling of the crisis, also resigned, along with his deputy Marcos Farfan.

On 11 October, the Chamber of Deputies of Bolivia had approved the President's decision to consult with local indigenous tribes regarding the project.

Cancellation

On 21 October 2011, Morales announced a possible postponement or cancellation of the proposed Amazon highway. Morales passed a law through the Bolivian Congress that would prohibit construction of a highway through the national park.

=== International ===
United Nations – Following the clash in Yucumo, the United Nations' delegate in the country, Yoriko Yasukawa, said that "the most important thing for us is that they stop the violence as soon as possible. And to remind the authorities that it is their responsibility to stop violence and protect the people."

Ecuador – The Confederation of Indigenous Nationalities of Ecuador sent Morales a letter of concern.

Media

The Guardian wrote that:

Having nationalised gas and oil and introduced some immediate measures of social welfare, it seemed that the government of Morales would indeed, as he movingly declared at the Copenhagen Climate Conference, give priority to the protection of "Pachamama" and the long neglected rights of Bolivia's first nations. The march from the national park – or to give it its full name the Indigenous Territory of the Isiboro Sécure National Park (Tipnis) – was intended to insist on those constitutional rights...The attack on the Tipnis marchers will serve only to fuel a growing disillusionment. The guarantee of prior consultation in the constitution was ignored over petrol price rises (in 2010), and again over road-building projects like this one. And the defence of Mother Earth rings hollow when it is clear that the economic strategy the Morales government has adopted seems to rely on new contracts with a range of multinational companies to develop oil, gas, lithium and uranium reserves – in other words, the very extractive industries that had gutted Bolivia's subsoil at the expense of a population 69% of whom were living in poverty when Morales came to power.

The BBC echoed the sentiment saying that Morales is accused of "authorising excessive police force" and "putting economic development ahead of the conservation of the Amazon rainforest." It also added that the social movements that supported him initially have now turned against him. It concluded that:

With opinion polls suggesting Mr Morales' popularity is falling, some commentators are wondering if he will see out his second term in office, due to end in early 2015. Or will he leave power like the two previous presidents, fleeing to escape mass protests by social movements who have learned that, in Bolivia, politics is made on the streets.

== Analysis ==
Following the 2011 Bolivian judicial election, which resulted in a poor valid vote count after a campaign by the opposition to either boycott the election or cast blank ballots, Morales' standing was read as having been set back.

== See also ==
- List of protests in the 21st century
