= Flag of the patujú flower =

Flag representing native people in Bolivia

Patujú flower
- Use: Civil flag and ensign normal
- Proportion: 8:11
- Adopted: 2013 (Santa Cruz Department); 2014 (Beni Department); 2018 (La Paz Department); 2019 (officially adopted by national government)
- Design: Patujú Flower in 45° degrees
- Designed by: Remberto Justiniano Cujuy; Aldemir Saldaña Mole; Julio Ribera Paniagua; Félix Melgar Gualujna; Wálter Zabala Escóbar
- Use: popular version in Beni, Santa Cruz and La Paz lowlands

The flag of the patujú flower (Spanish: Bandera de la flor de patujú, Aymara: Patujú wiphala) is a flag used at official events of the Bolivia government, which shows Bolivia's national flower. The latter represents the indigenous peoples of Eastern Bolivia and has been used as a symbol of protest against the construction of a highway in TIPNIS by the opponents of Evo Morales in that area of the country.

== History ==
The Patujú flag was created in 2009 by indigenous leaders and an indigenous pastoral director to represent the indigenous peoples of the lowlands of Bolivia as an alternative to the Wiphala flag of the Andes, which represents the Andean-Vallunian peoples of Bolivia. The white background represents Amazonian wisdom (in the Mojeño worldview) and the Patujú flower is a noble symbol of the region. The actual design of the flower with leaf was an artistic creation based on nature.

Remberto Justiniano Cujuy, Aldemir Saldaña Mole, leaders of the Central de Pueblos Indígenas del Beni (CPIB) and Julio Ribera Paniagua, Director of the Pastoral Indígena del Vicariato del Beni, created the Patujú Flag, as a national symbol of the native peoples of the lowlands, as an alternative to the Wiphala. It was created on August 10 and premiered on August 15, 2009, in commemoration of the March for Territory and Dignity of 1990.

=== 2011 TIPNIS protests massive use ===
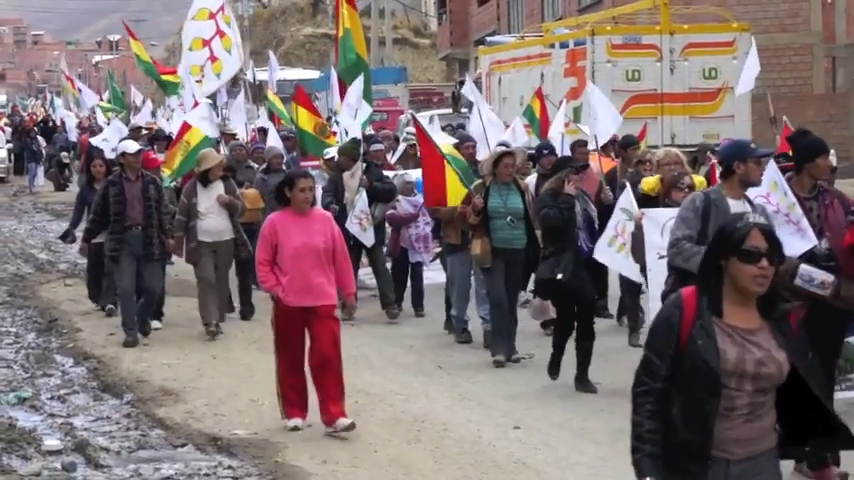
Use of the flag during the TIPNIS protests in 2011.

With the demonstrations against the construction of a road in Isiboro Sécure National Park and Indigenous Territory (TIPNIS) in 2011 and 2012 came the idea of representing eastern Bolivia with the flower of patujú, and the flag was present in these demonstrations. However, it did not have official representation in public events at national level, not even an exclusive design. However, in 2013, it started to be used in the Santa Cruz Department, in 2014 in the Beni Department and in 2018 in the La Paz Department.

Thus, the president of the Confederation of Indigenous Peoples of Bolivia, Adolfo Chávez Beyuma, popularized this flag together with Antonio Soto Guatara as a national symbol of the native peoples of the lowlands, alleging that they do not feel identified by the Wiphala.

=== Use in the National Government of Bolivia ===
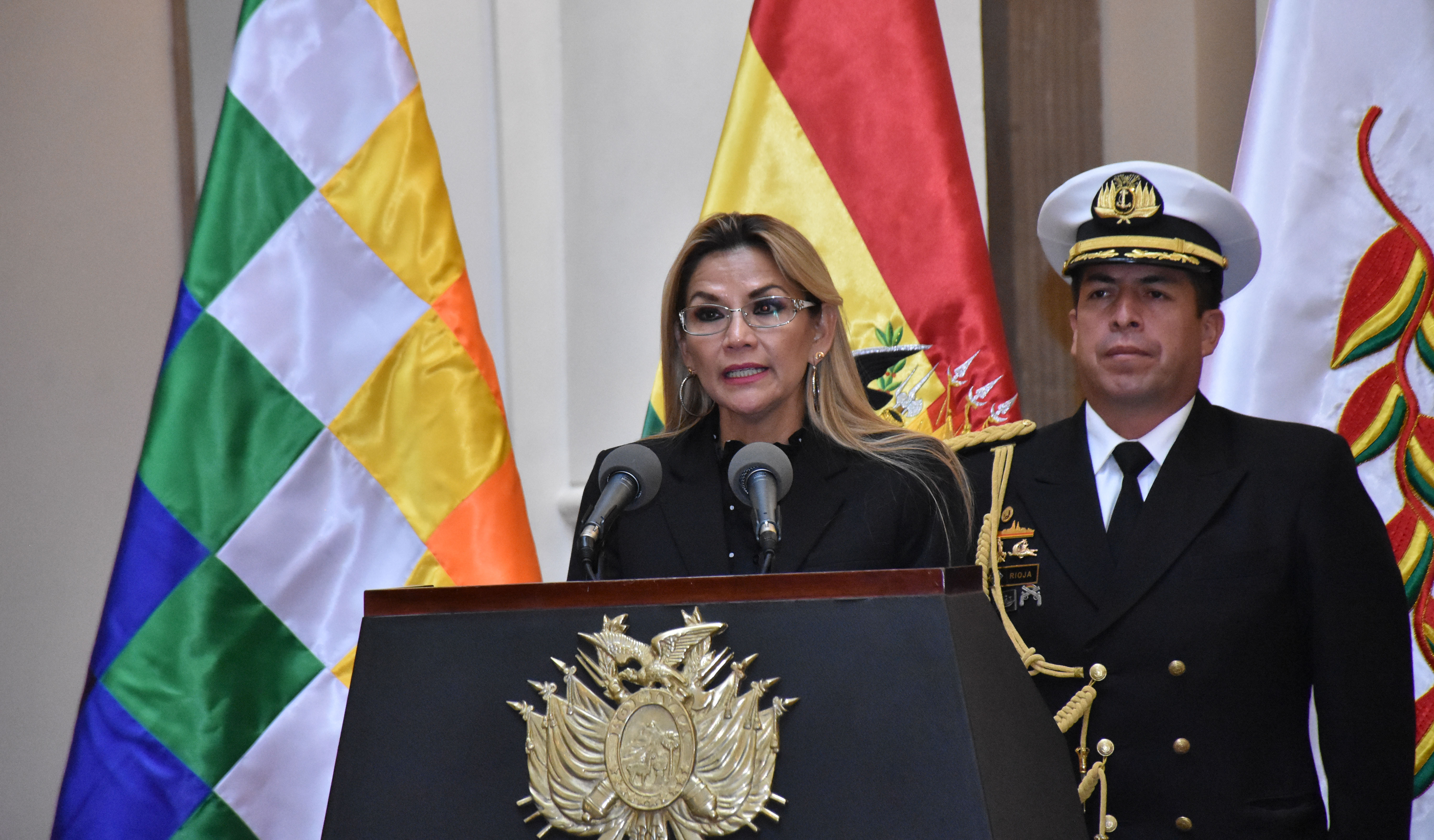
During the government of Jeanine Áñez, the Patujú flag was included to the right side of the Wiphala and the flag of Bolivia.

During the government of Jeanine Áñez the flag was used next to the two flags of state institutions in Palacio Quemado and those in official acts with a new and exclusive design.

=== Proposal of recognition as national symbol of Bolivia ===
Rafael López Mercado proposed to present a bill for the flag to be recognized as a national symbol, before that he wanted to send it to the CIDOB for its socialization and consent by the indigenous people of the east.

On October 6, 2021, a group of MAS-IPSP deputies presented a bill for the flag of the patujú flower to be recognized as a national flag like the wiphala and the tricolor.

We as national deputies are presenting a bill that aims to honor and respect our national symbols and recognize as national flags, along with our highest national symbol, such as the national tricolor, the wiphala and the flower of the patujú.

— Deisy Choque, Congresswoman of the Movement Towards Socialism (MAS-IPSP)

In May 2023, a bill was introduced that contemplates the official recognition of the flag, already officially recognized by Bolivian eastern provinces. The bill was rejected.

== See also ==
- 2019 Bolivian political crisis
- 2011 Bolivian Indigenous rights protests
- Wiphala
