= Politics of Bolivia =

The politics of Bolivia takes place in a framework of a presidential representative democratic republic, whereby the president is head of state, head of government and head of a diverse multi-party system. Executive power is exercised by the government. Legislative power is vested in both the government and the two chambers of parliament. Both the Judiciary and the electoral branch are independent of the executive and the legislature. After the 2014 Bolivian general election, 53.1% of the seats in national parliament were held by women, a higher proportion of women than that of the population.

== History ==
The Bolivian Civil War between the Conservatives and the Liberals ended in 1899 with the latter's victory; a liberal era began that lasted until 1920. A system of public education developed, accompanied by moderate anticlericalism: Catholicism lost its status as the only religion recognized by the State in 1906 and civil marriage was adopted in 1911. Bolivian liberalism, however, clearly lost its progressive character to coexist with the interests of the new tin fortunes (the liberal era is sometimes also considered to be the tin era, with tin production having increased considerably), landowners and the army. Inspired by the example of the Ecuadorian Liberal Revolution of 1895 led by Eloy Alfaro, a new liberalism organized itself into a republican party and expressed some social concerns against the domination of the liberal oligarchy.

== Constitution ==
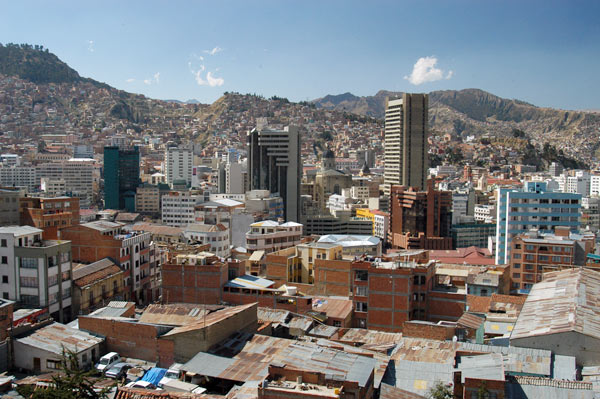
La Paz is Bolivia's Seat of Government.

Bolivia's current constitution was adopted via referendum in 2009, providing for a unitary secular state.

== Executive branch ==
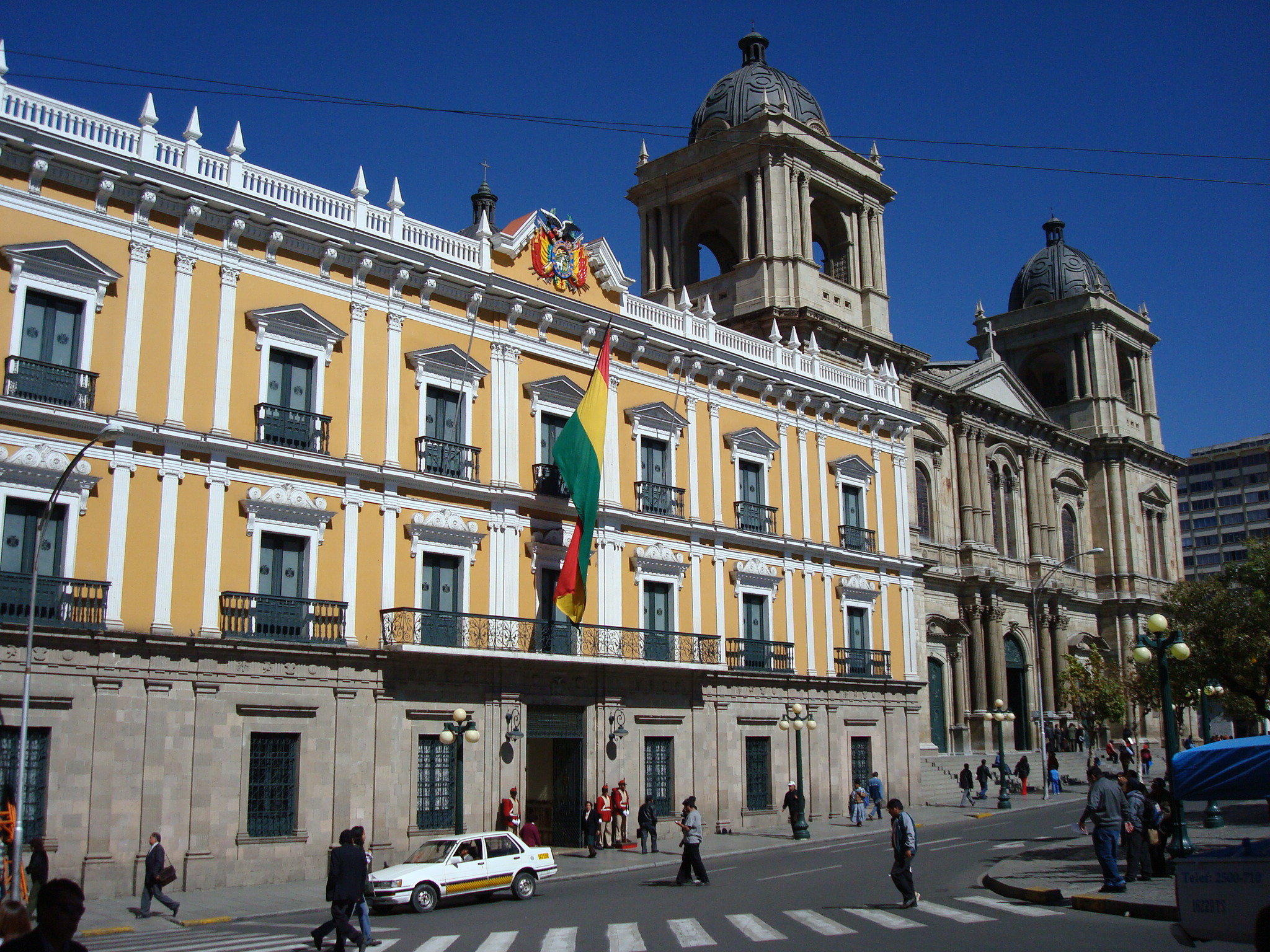
Palacio Quemado, seats the executive power.

The president is directly elected to a five-year term by popular vote. A candidate needs either an absolute majority or 40% and a 10-point lead to win the election. In the case that no candidate is elected in the first vote, a run-off vote elects the president from among the two candidates most voted in the first vote.

Hugo Banzer was elected president in 1997. Although no candidate had received more than 50% of the popular vote in the national election, Banzer won a congressional runoff election on 5 August 1997 after forming the so-called "megacoalition" with other parties. He resigned in August 2001 and was substituted by his vice president Jorge Quiroga. In August 2002, the winner of the national election Gonzalo Sánchez de Lozada was chosen president by Congress, winning an 84–43 vote against popular vote runner-up Evo Morales. Elected president Gonzalo Sánchez de Lozada resigned in October 2003, and was substituted by vice-president Carlos Mesa who governed the nation until his resignation in June 2005. He was replaced by chief justice of the Supreme Court Eduardo Rodríguez, acting as caretaker president. Six months later, on December 18, 2005, cocalero leader Evo Morales was elected president.

A group of MEPs acting as election observers oversaw a constitutional referendum in Bolivia that gave more power to indigenous peoples 25 January 2009. The titly fought referendum laid out a number of key reforms such as allowing President Evo Morales to stand for re-election, state control over natural gas and limits on the size of land people can own.

=== Ministries ===
Bolivia currently has twenty-one ministries in the executive branch. The heads of these ministries form the cabinet.

- Ministry of Foreign Affairs
- Ministry of the Presidency
- Ministry of Government
- Ministry of Defense
- Ministry of Development Planning
- Ministry of Economy and Public Finance
- Ministry of Hydrocarbons and Energy
- Ministry of Productive Development and Plural Economy
- Ministry of Public Works, Services, and Housing
- Ministry of Mining and Metallurgy
- Ministry of Justice and Institutional Transparency
- Ministry of Labor and Social Security
- Ministry of Health and Sports
- Ministry of Environment and Water
- Ministry of Education
- Ministry of Rural Development and Land
- Ministry of Culture, Decolonization and Depatriarchalization

== Legislative branch ==
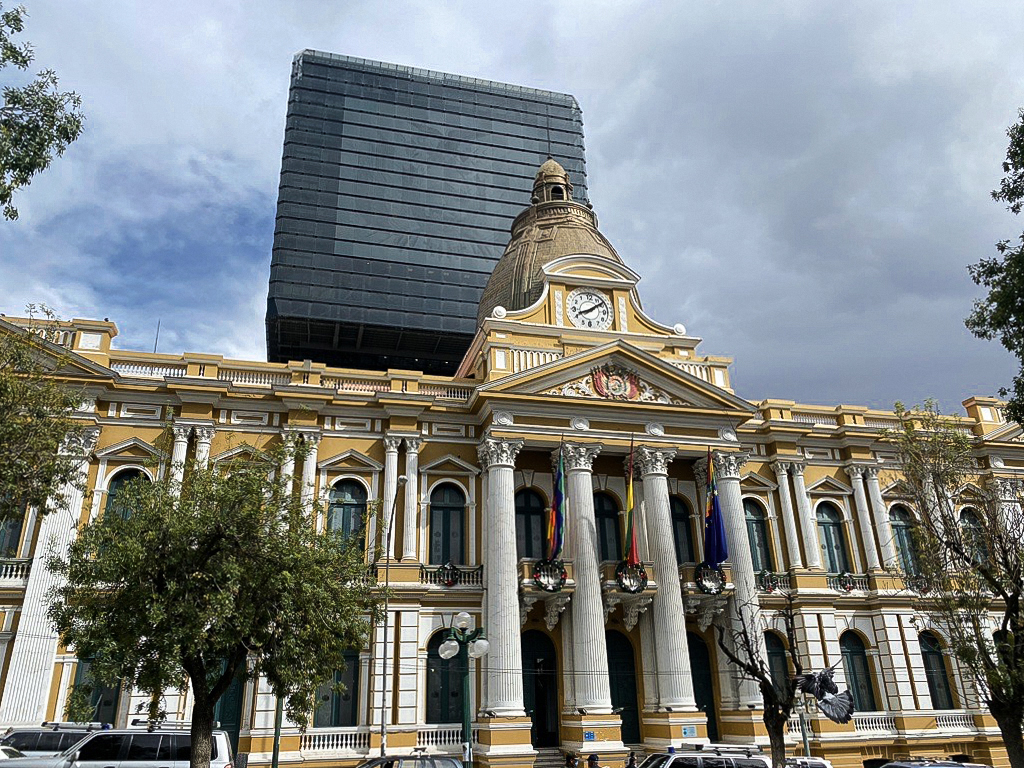
The Plurinational Legislative Assembly.

The bicameral Plurinational Legislative Assembly consists of the Chamber of Senators (36 seats; members are elected by proportional representation from party lists to serve five-year terms) and the Chamber of Deputies (130 seats; 70 are directly elected from their districts, 63 are elected by proportional representation from party lists, and 7 are elected by indigenous peoples of most departments, to serve five-year terms).

== Judicial branch ==
The judiciary consists of the Supreme Court of Justice, the Plurinational Constitutional Court, the Judiciary Council, Agrarian and Environmental Court, and District (departmental) and lower courts.

- Plurinational Constitutional Court — rules on the constitutionality of government or court actions
- Supreme Court of Justice
- Agrarian and Environmental Court (Spanish: Tribunal Agroambiental) — highest court authority in matters of agriculture and the environment
- Judiciary Council (Spanish: Consejo de la Magistratura) — oversees the conduct of courts and judges, including misconduct and ethical violations
- District Courts (one in each department)
- Provincial and local courts

In October 2011, Bolivia held its first judicial elections to choose members of the national courts by popular vote. Twenty-eight elected members and twenty-eight alternates were sworn in on 3 January 2011 in Sucre.

=== Plurinational Constitutional Court ===
The members of the Plurinational Constitutional Court, elected in October 2011, are: Ligia Velásquez, Mirtha Camacho, Melvy Andrade, Zoraida Chanes, Gualberto Cusi, Efraín Choque, and Ruddy Flores. The elected alternate members are: Isabel Ortuño, Lidia Chipana, Mario Pacosillo, Katia López, Javier Aramayo, Miriam Pacheco, and Rommy Colque.

=== Supreme Court of Justice ===
The members of the Supreme Court of Justice, elected in October 2011, are: Maritza Suntura (La Paz Department), Jorge Isaac Von Borries Méndez (Santa Cruz), Rómulo Calle Mamani (Oruro), Pastor Segundo Mamani Villca (Potosí), Antonio Guido Campero Segovia (Tarija), Gonzalo Miguel Hurtado Zamorano (Beni), Fidel Marcos Tordoya Rivas (Cochabamba), Rita Susana Nava (Tarija), and Norka Natalia Mercado Guzmán (Pando). The elected alternate members are: William Alave (La Paz), María Arminda Ríos García (Santa Cruz), Ana Adela Quispe Cuba (Oruro), Elisa Sánchez Mamani (Potosí), Carmen Núñez Villegas (Tarija), Silvana Rojas Panoso (Beni), María Lourdes Bustamante (Cochabamba), Javier Medardo Serrano (Tarija), and Delfín Humberto Betancour Chinchilla (Pando). Gonzalo Miguel Hurtado Zamorano was elected President of the Court on 3 January 2012.

The Supreme Court of Justice replaces the Supreme Court, active since Bolivia's founding in 1825.

=== Judiciary Council ===
The members of the Judiciary Council, elected in October 2011, are (in order of total votes received): Cristina Mamani, Freddy Sanabria, Wilma Mamani, Roger Triveño, and Ernesto Araníbar. Cristina Mamani was elected by her peers as the first president of the Judiciary Council on 4 January 2012.

=== Agro-environmental Court ===
The members of the Agro-environmental Court, elected in October 2011, are (in order of total votes received): Bernardo Huarachi, Deysi Villagómez, Gabriela Armijo Paz, Javier Peñafiel, Juan Ricardo Soto, Lucio Fuentes, and Yola Paucara. The elected alternate members are: Isabel Ortuño, Lidia Chipana, Mario Pacosillo, Katia López, Javier Aramayo, Miriam Pacheco, and Rommy Colque.

== Electoral branch ==
The electoral branch of Bolivia's government, formally the Plurinational Electoral Organ, is an independent branch of government which replaced the National Electoral Court in 2010. The branch consists of the Supreme Electoral Tribunal, the nine Departmental Electoral Tribunals, Electoral Judges, the anonymously selected Juries at Election Tables, and Electoral Notaries. Wilfredo Ovando presides over the seven-member Supreme Electoral Tribunal. Its operations are mandated by the Constitution and regulated by the Electoral Regime Law (Law 026, passed 2010). The Organ's first elections will be the country's first judicial election in October 2011 and five municipal special elections expected to be held in 2011.

== Local government ==
Bolivia is divided into nine departments (departamentos, singular – departamento); Chuquisaca, Cochabamba, Beni, La Paz, Oruro, Pando, Potosi, Santa Cruz, Tarija. Bolivia's nine departments received greater autonomy under the Administrative Decentralization law of 1995. Departmental autonomy further increased with the first popular elections for departmental governors, known as prefects, on 18 December 2005. Departments are governed by the elected governors (until 2010, prefects; and until 2005, appointed by the President) and by independently elected Departmental Legislative Assemblies (until 2010; Departmental Councils).

Bolivian cities and towns are governed by directly elected mayors and councils. Municipal elections were last held on 4 April 2010, with both mayors councils elected to five-year terms. The Popular Participation Law of April 1994, which distributes a significant portion of national revenues to municipalities for discretionary use, has enabled previously neglected communities to make striking improvements in their facilities and services.

== Political parties and elections ==
The governing Movement for Socialism (Movimiento al Socialismo, MAS) is a Left-wing, Socialist political party led by Evo Morales, founded in 1997. It has governed the country since 2006, following the first ever majority victory by a single party in the December 2005 elections. MAS evolved out of the movement to defend the interests of coca growers. Currently, the MAS stands as a party committed to equality, indigenous rights, agrarian land reform, Constitutional reform as well as nationalization of key industries with an aim to redistribute the returns through increased social spending. Among the poor, rural and indigenous population the MAS enjoys nearly unanimous support.

The right-of-center opposition includes a variety of political parties. During the 2005–09 political cycle the largest of these was PODEMOS, a successor to Nationalist Democratic Action. In the 2009 elections, several parties and politicians united to form Plan Progreso para Bolivia – Convergencia Nacional, whose presidential candidate, Manfred Reyes Villa and parliamentary slate came in second in the 2009 elections.

Three political parties were dominant from 1982 to 2005: The Revolutionary Nationalist Movement which had carried out the 1952 Revolution; Revolutionary Left Movement; and Nationalist Democratic Action founded in 1982 by former dictator and later elected President Hugo Banzer. Despite the revolutionary names of the first two, they generally pursued centrist economic policies.

In October 2025, Rodrigo Paz of the centre-right Christian Democratic Party (PDC) won the run-off race of the election against right-wing former president Jorge Quiroga, meaning the end of governance by the Movement for Socialism (MAS) party and a clear political shift to the right.

Other parties include:

- Bolivian Socialist Falange or FSB – Romel Pantoja
- Civic Solidarity Union or UCS – Jhonny Fernández
- Free Bolivia Movement or MBL – Franz Barrios
- Marshal of Ayacucho Institutional Vanguard or VIMA – Freddy Zabala
- Movement of the Revolutionary Left or MIR – Jaime Paz Zamora
- Movement Without Fear or MSM – Juan Del Granado
- Nationalist Democratic Action or ADN –
- Socialist Party or PS – Jerjes Justiniano

== Social movements ==
Some of Bolivia's social movements are:

- Cocalero Groups – Evo Morales
- "El Alto" Social Movements Roberto De La Cruz
- indigenous organization: Aymara Indigenous Confederate Movements Felipe Quispe
- "El Alto" FEJUVE Abel Mamani
- labor unions
- Sole Confederation of Campesino Workers of Bolivia or CSUTCB – Roman Loayza
- Autonomic Oriental Party

== International affairs ==
International organization participation:

ALBA, CAN, CELAC, FAO, G-77, IADB, IAEA, IBRD, ICAO, ICCt, ICRM, IDA, IFAD, IFC, IFRCS, ILO, IMF, IMO, Interpol, IOC, IOM, ISO (correspondent), ITU, LAES, LAIA, Mercosur (associate), MIGA, MINUSTAH, MONUC, NAM, OAS, ONUB, OPANAL, OPCW, PCA, RG, UN, UNAMSIL, UNASUR, UNCTAD, UNESCO, UNIDO, UNMIK, UNMIL, UNMISET, UNOCI, UPU, WCL, WCO, WFTU, WHO, WIPO, WMO, WToO, WTO

== See also ==
- Censorship in Bolivia
- History of Bolivia
- List of presidents of Bolivia
