= Mass media in Bolivia =

In the mass media in Bolivia there are nearly 200 privately owned television stations, but because rural regions of the country have few televisions and television reception is poor in many areas of the country, radio remains an important news disseminator. As of 2006, Bolivia had more than 480 radio stations, most of which were regional in scope. Bolivia also has eight national newspapers, in addition to many local ones. Of the national papers, four are based in La Paz, three in Santa Cruz, and one in Cochabamba. As of 2006, most Bolivians continued to get their news from newspapers and radio broadcasts.

The Bolivian constitution protects freedom of the press and speech. Most newspapers take antigovernment positions. Both state-owned and privately owned radio stations operate without government censorship. Some restrictions do exist, however. The Penal Code demands jail time for those persons found guilty of slandering, insulting, or defaming public officials. In particular, the president, vice president, and ministers are protected by the Penal Code. Those charged with violating press standards are brought before the independent La Paz Press Tribunal.

== History of the Bolivian media ==
Radio service began in Bolivia in 1927. Two years later, the country's official broadcaster National Radio of Bolivia (NRB) was formed. Television service began in 1963, with the formation of the government-owned Channel 7 network.

Bolivian governments historically recognized the political significance of the media and attempted to censor communication channels employed by the opposition. In the 1940s, the Revolutionary Nationalist Movement (MNR) utilized the daily La Calle to mobilize support for its cause. During the revolution, the MNR purged unfavorable news media and established La Nación as the official news organization. Military governments, in particular, subjected journalists to harassment, jail terms, and exile. The Banzer government, for example, expelled many journalists from the country. In the early part of the 1980s, General García Meza closed down several radio stations and ordered the creation of a state-run network binding all private stations. Many Bolivian and foreign journalists were imprisoned and their reports censored.

After 1982 freedom of the press developed as an important byproduct of the democratization of Bolivian politics. Siles Zuazo's government was perhaps the first to honor its pledge to respect freedom of expression. Radio and newspapers were guaranteed freedoms that Bolivians had never enjoyed previously.

In the early years of democratic rule, the monopoly enjoyed by Channel 7, the state-run television station, represented the greatest obstacle to freedom of the press. Until 1984 Channel 7 was part of the patronage distributed to partisan supporters. Although the Siles Zuazo administration respected freedom of the press in other media, it used the station to further its political agenda and barred the establishment of privately owned stations. The Ministry of Information argued that television was a strategic industry that had to be kept under state control. After several rounds with the opposition in Congress, the minister of information refused to issue permits for the opening of private television stations.

Despite government restrictions, the media experienced a tremendous boom in the mid-1980s. The growth and proliferation of party politics generated a concomitant expansion in the communications industry. Newspapers, television, and radio stations mushroomed during the 1984-85 electoral season. Some forty-seven public and private television stations were in operation by 1989. One of the great surprises was the presence of six channels in the city of Trinidad, Beni Department, which had a population of fewer than 50,000. In short, democracy had magnified the importance of the media in Bolivian politics.

In 1989 daily newspapers reflected the general pattern of ties between party politics and the media. Five daily newspapers enjoyed national circulation: Presencia, Última Hora, Hoy, El Diario (La Paz), and El Mundo (Santa Cruz). Of these, Presencia was the only publication that did not reflect partisan interests. Founded in 1962 under Roman Catholic auspices, Presencia was the largest and most widely read newspaper, with a circulation of 90,000. In large measure, Presencia reflected the opinions of socially conscious Roman Catholic clergy, who often used its pages to advocate reform.

The oldest newspaper in Bolivia was El Diario, with a circulation of 45,000. Founded in 1904, this daily belonged to the Carrasco family, one of the most prominent in La Paz. Historically, El Diario reflected the very conservative philosophy of the founding family. In 1971, during the populist fervor of the Torres period, its offices were taken over by workers and converted into a cooperative. The Banzer government returned the newspaper to the Carrasco family. Hence, El Diario was generally perceived as partisan to the views of Banzer and his ADN party. The death of Jorge Carrasco, the paper's director, however, apparently changed the philosophy of the daily. Jorge Escobari Cusicanqui, the new director, was linked to Condepa.

El Mundo, with a circulation of 20,000, emerged as one of the most influential daily newspapers in Bolivia. It was owned by Osvaldo Monasterios, a prominent Santa Cruz businessman. This newspaper was commonly identified as the voice of the ADN. A similar observation could be made about Última Hora, formerly an afternoon paper that had been circulating in the mornings since 1986. Mario Mercado Vaca Guzmán, one of Bolivia's wealthiest entrepreneurs and a well-known ADN militant, owned Última Hora. This newspaper had hired outstanding academics to write its editorials.

Perhaps the most politicized of all newspapers in Bolivia was Hoy, owned by Carlos Serrate, an eccentric politician who also owned Radio Méndez. Serrate demonstrated how the media could be utilized to achieve electoral advantage. Through Hoy, which had a circulation of 25,000, and Radio Méndez, Serrate made huge inroads into the rural areas of La Paz Department for the VR-9 de Abril, his political party. The only other newspaper of significance in Bolivia was Los Tiempos, a Cochabamba daily with a circulation of 18,000. In the 1970s, Los Tiempos had been the leading newspaper in the interior, but it was bypassed by El Mundo in the 1980s.

Like the printed media, private television stations reflected the positions of the major political parties in Bolivia. By the same token, the political line of the owners was often reflected in the news broadcasts of each channel. This situation was particularly true in La Paz, where the city's eight channels, including Channel 7 and Channel 13 (the university station), were tied directly to political parties.

== See also ==
- Censorship in Bolivia
