= Coordination of the Indigenous Organizations of the Brazilian Amazon =

Brazilian indigenous organization

COIAB logo

Coordination of the Indigenous Organizations of the Brazilian Amazon (Portuguese: Coordenação das Organizações Indígenas da Amazônia Brasileira) or COIAB is a Brazilian indigenous organization composed by several indigenous rights organizations of the Brazilian Amazon Basin. It was created at a meeting of indigenous leaders in April 1989 and is now composed of 75 member organizations from all 9 states of Brazilian Amazon. Its headquarters is in Manaus. The organization represents around 160 different indigenous peoples, on approximately 110 million hectares of amazon territory. They struggle for basic rights of land, health, education and interculturality. COIAB is a member of the Amazon Basin indigenous organization, COICA.
