= Adolfo Chávez =

Bolivian indigenous leader

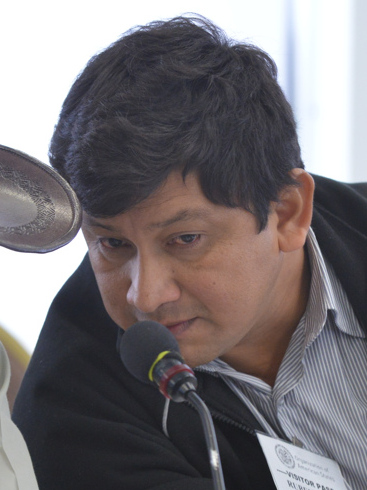
- Adolfo Chávez in 2013
- Born: 2 March 1971 (age 55); Tumupasa Community, Bolivia
- Education: Universidad Mayor de San Andrés
- Occupation: Indigenist political activism
- Organization(s): CIDOB; COICA
- Known for: Creating the Flag of the Patujú flower in part; Leading the TIPNIS 2011 protests against the Morales Administration

Adolfo Chávez Beyuma (born 2 March 1971), a Bolivian indigenous leader, has been the president of the Confederation of Indigenous Peoples of Bolivia (CIDOB) since 2006. Chávez is a member of the Takana people, born in Tumusa, Mecapaca Municipality, Murillo Province of the La Paz Department of Bolivia. He has twice been elected as Secretary of Land and Territory of the La Paz departmental indigenous organization, Center of Indigenous Peoples of La Paz (CPILAP). Between 2018 and 2022 he administered the Coordinator of Indigenous Organizations of the Amazon River Basin (COICA).

The Flag of the Patujú flower, previously created in 2009, was popularized by Adolfo Chávez Beyuma in 2011.

He helped to popularize the Flag of the Patujú flower which was a prominent symbol in the 2011 TIPNIS protests.
