= Marcial Fabricano =

Bolivian politician

Marcial Fabricano Noe is a Bolivian indigenous leader from the Mojeño-Trinitario ethnic group. He has previously served as president of the Confederation of Indigenous Peoples of the Bolivian East and was a vice-presidential candidate of the Free Bolivia Movement.

== Biography ==
Fabricano was born on 10 July 1953 in San Lorenzo de Moxos. He completed secondary education in Guayaramerín. He served in community leadership roles beginning in 1983 and emerged as a principal voice in the 1990 March for Territory and Dignity, organized by the Confederation of Indigenous Peoples of the Bolivian East. At the time of the march, Fabricano was the head of the Center of Indigenous Peoples of Beni.

== Party politics ==
In 1997, Fabricano offered to participate in national elections to represent the lowland indigenous movement; he also sought eight parliamentary seats for lowland indigenous groups. This move caused controversy in the movement, which has generally remained aloof from party politics. Fabricano was nominated as the vice-presidential candidate for the Movimiento Bolivia Libre (Free Bolivia Movement), running alongside presidential candidate Miguel Urioste Fernández de Córdova. The party won 3.0% of the vote in the general election held on 1 June.
