= Confederation of Indigenous Peoples of Bolivia =

Bolivian organization of indigenous people

- Confederación de Pueblos Indígenas de Bolivia
- Founded: October 1982
- Purpose: Indigenous rights and representation
- Headquarters: Santa Cruz de la Sierra, Bolivia
- Region served: Bolivia

The Confederation of Indigenous Peoples of Bolivia (Spanish: Confederación de Pueblos Indígenas de Bolivia; formerly, Spanish: Confederación de Pueblos Indígenas del Oriente Boliviano or CIDOB) is a national representative organization of the Bolivian indigenous movement. It was founded in October 1982 in Santa Cruz de la Sierra as the Confederation of Indigenous Peoples of the Bolivian East, with the participation of representatives of four indigenous peoples of the Bolivian East: Guarani-Izoceños, Chiquitanos, Ayoreos and Guarayos.

Currently, CIDOB gathers 34 peoples living in the Lowlands of Bolivia, in seven of the nine departments of Bolivia: Santa Cruz, Beni, Pando, Tarija, Chuquisaca, Cochabamba and La Paz. Since 2006, CIDOB's president is Adolfo Chávez Beyuma, of the Takana people. CIDOB is a member of the National Coordination for Change, and of the Amazon Basin indigenous organization, COICA. CIDOB was a member of the Pact of Unity from its founding until December 2011, when it left in protest of the Evo Morales government's response to its eighth march concerning the Isiboro Sécure National Park and Indigenous Territory.

== Member organizations ==
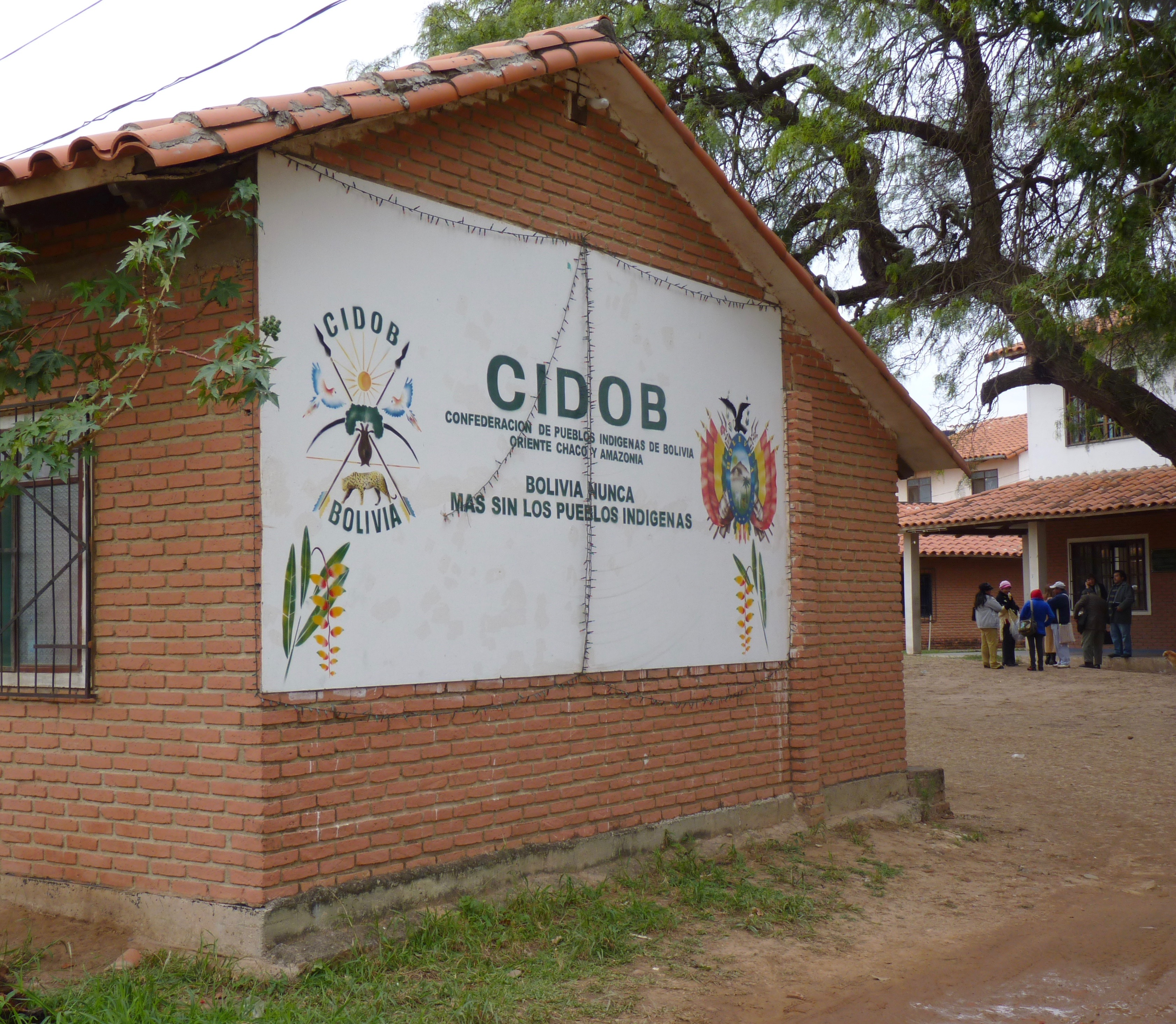
Headquarters of the Confederation of Indigenous Peoples of Bolivia, in Santa Cruz. Beside the organization's coat of arms, it reads: "Never again a Bolivia without indigenous peoples."

The following organizations make up the confederation:

- Assembly of the Guarani People (Asamblea del Pueblo Guaraní; APG)
- Center of Guarayo Native Peoples' Organizations (Central de Organizaciones de los Pueblos Nativos Guarayos; COPNAG)
- Center of Indigenous Peoples of Beni (Central de los Pueblos Indígenas de Beni; CPIB)
- Indigenous Center of the Bolivian Amazon Region (Central Indígena de la Región Amazónica de Bolivia; CIRABO), including the following peoples: Cavineño, Chácobo, Esse Ejja, Takana, Pacahuara, and Araonas.
- Indigenous Center of the Original Amazon Peoples of Pando (Central Indígena de la Pueblos Originarios Amazónicos de Pando; CIPOAP)
- Center of Indigenous Peoples of La Paz (Central de Pueblos Indígenas de La Paz; CPILAP)
- Coordination of Indigenous Peoples of the Tropic of Cochabamba (Coordinadora de Pueblos Indígenas del Trópico de Cochabamba; CPITCO)
- Organization of Weehnayek and Tapiete Captaincies (Organización de Capitanías Weehnayek y Tapiete; ORCAWETA)

== History ==
Initial contacts between the four founding peoples of CIDOB began at the initiative of Guaraní leader Mburuvichaguau Bonifacio Barrientos Iyambae (also known by the moniker Sombra Grande) in 1979. The Guarani-Izoceño, Chiquitano, Ayoreo and Guarayo peoples co-founded the Confederation of Indigenous Peoples of the Bolivian East in 1982 in Santa Cruz de la Sierra.

Leaders of CIDOB have included:

Dates	Name	Ethnic group	Home community	Notes
	Mburuvichaguau Bonifacio Barrientos Iyambae	Guaraní	Tamachindi	"Sombra Grande" (Great Shadow). Founder of CIDOB
1982-1983	Víctor Vaca	Guaraní	Tamachindi	
1983-1984	Cecilio Gómez	Guaraní	Aguaraygua	
1984-1986	José Urañavi Yeroqui	Guarayu	Urubichá	
1986-1989	Miguel García Chure	Chiquitano	Lomerío	
1989-1991	Susano Padilla	Guaraní	Iyobi	
1991-1994	Vicente Pessoa	Chiquitano	Altamira	
1994-1996	Marcial Fabricano Noe	Moxeño Trinitario	San Lorenzo	
1996-1998	Amalio Siye Ramos	Chiquitano	San Matías	
Nov 1998 – Mar 2002	Nicolás Montero	Guaraní	Poja Colorada	
Mar – Aug 2002	Marcial Fabricano Noe	Moxeño Trinitario	San Lorenzo	
Sep – Oct 2002	Roberto Cartagena	Tacana	Tumupasa	
2002–2006	Egberto Tavo			
2006–2018	Adolfo Chávez Beyuma	Tacana	Tumusa	One of the creators of the Flag of the patujú flower
2021-	Tomas Candia			

== Mobilizations ==
CIDOB has been the principal organizer of a series of national marches. The first was the March for Territory and Dignity, from Trinidad, Beni to La Paz in August and September 1990. The march was coordinated by Marcial Fabricano and began with around 300 participants, but swelled to some 800 indigenous people by the time of its arrival in La Paz on September 19. This march led to the recognition of four indigenous territories (Siriono Indigenous Territory, Isiboro Sécure National Park and Indigenous Territory, the Multiethnic Indigenous Territory I, and Chimán Indigenous Territory) and the government's 1991 ratification of the ILO Indigenous and Tribal Peoples Convention.

A second March for Territory, Land, Political Participation and Development was held in 1996. It began with 2000 CIDOB marchers in Santa Cruz de la Sierra on August 27, 1996, and was joined by members of the Unique Confederation of Rural Laborers of Bolivia (CSUTCB) and the Confederation of Indigenous Peoples of Bolivia (CSCB) on the following day. CIDOB won its demand that indigenous land rights be protected as indigenous territories, with elements of sovereignty and local jurisdiction and ended its participation in the march in Samaipata, Santa Cruz. CSUTCB and CSCB continued the march to La Paz, where some 13,000 marchers grew to twenty to forty thousand protesters, but were unsuccessful in winning the campesino federations' demands. The mobilization coincided with the passage of the 1996 National Institute of Agrarian Reform (INRA) Law (Law 1715), which changed land reform policy in ways that encouraged absentee land ownership and speculation.

In 2000, CPESC (the regional federation for Santa Cruz), the Mojeño people of Beni, and several Amazonian peoples carried out the March for the Earth, Territory, and Natural Resources (Spanish: Marcha por la Tierra, el Territorio y los Recursos Naturales) from Riberalta, Beni to Montero, Santa Cruz. This march won changes to the agrarian reform law and a decree officially recognizing lowland indigenous languages.

A 2002 March for Popular Sovereignty, Territory, and National Resources (Spanish: Marcha por la Soberanía Popular, el Territorio y los Recursos Naturales) marched from Santa Cruz to La Paz.

In October and November 2006, CIDOB, the Bolivian Landless Workers Movement (MST-Bolivia), highland indigenous groups, and others joined in a National March for Land and Territory. This 28-day march was designed to propel the passage of a new land reform law, then mired in Bolivia's National Congress. After 2,000 marchers arrived in El Alto on November 27, they were joined by tens of thousands of other demonstrators in marching to La Paz's Plaza San Francisco, and on to the Plaza Murillo before the National Congress building where they set up a tent city. The encampment continued until the passage of a new land reform law.

On 7 July 2007, CIDOB began a Sixth Indigenous March from Santa Cruz to the Constituent Assembly then meeting in Sucre. The march demanded indigenous autonomy, territorial protection, a plurinational state, and indigenous control over natural resources in their territories. On 10 July, CIDOB president Adolfo Chávez was assaulted by right-wing protesters in Sucre's airport during a visit to present the organization's demands. The 470 marchers included 170 women and 68 children under 12. After ten days of marching under difficult weather conditions, CIDOB suspended the march in the locality of El Torno, announcing that 75% of its demands had been acceded to by the Assembly's commissions. Eleven member organizations announced they would each send 10 representatives to Sucre to watch over the progress of their proposals.

In July 2010, CIDOB led its seventh national march—Seventh Great Indigenous March for Territory, Autonomies, and the Rights of Indigenous Peoples (Spanish: VII Gran Marcha Indígena por el Territorio, las autonomías y los derechos de los Pueblos Indígenas)—demanding greater indigenous autonomy. This march made a 13-point set of demands (full translated text on WikiSource):

1. Titling and respect for Indigenous Communal Territories (TCOs)
2. (same subject as 1)
3. Return of lands
4. Annulling of mining and forest concessions that affect indigenous territories
5. Territorial integrity of TCOs
6. Autonomy with resources
7. Autonomy without a minimum number of inhabitants required
8. The right to consultation
9. Development projects
10. Economic resources
11. Consultation on projects
12. Additional seats in the Plurinational Legislative Assembly
13. The presence of indigenous authorities within the Government

The March ended after traveling from Trinidad, Beni to San Ramón, Santa Cruz, following incomplete negotiations and government pledges of action.

On July 26, 2011, CIDOB put forward a platform of demands for the Eighth March of the Indigenous Peoples of the East, Chaco, and Bolivian Amazon (Spanish: VIII Marcha Indígena de los Pueblos Indígenas del Oriente, Chaco y Amazonía Boliviana), which began in defense of the Isiboro Sécure National Park and Indigenous Territory against the planned construction of the Villa Tunari-San Ignacio de Moxos highway. The march from Trinidad, Beni, is scheduled to begin on August 15. The highland indigenous organization CONAMAQ, the Chiquitano Indigenous Organization, and the Assembly of the Guaraní People have all pledged to participate.

In September 2019, members of CIDOB along with the Indigenous Organization of the Chiquitanía (OICH) marched in the Tenth March of Indigenous Peoples. CIDOB's main demand was to roll back decrees that enabled land claims, deforestation, and burning, and it was conducted amidst the 2019 Amazon rainforest wildfires. The march revealed internal disputes within the group, as the CIDOB Orgánica (Grassroots CIDOB) faction participated in the march, while the CIDOB Paralela (Parallel CIDOB) faction leader Pedro Vare dismissed the fires as a seasonal phenomenon.
