= María Cecilia Chacón =

Bolivian politician

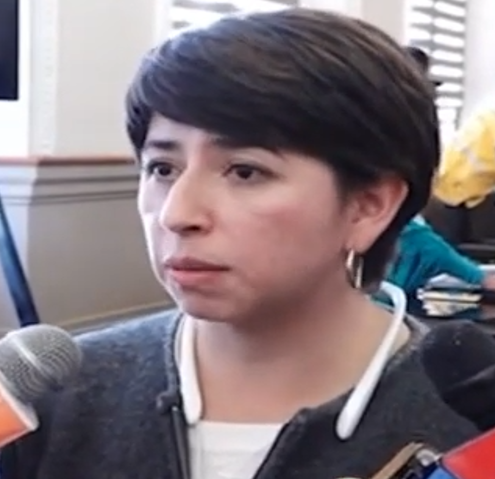
- Chacón in August 2019

Minister of Defense
- In office 2011
- President: Evo Morales

María Cecilia Chacón Rendón is a Bolivian lawyer and political scientist who served as the minister of defense in 2011. She became the first woman to occupy that office. She served as General Director of Multilateral Relations (Spanish: Directora General de Relaciones Multilaterales) and Chief of Cabinet for the Vice Ministry of Foreign Economic and Commercial Relations (Spanish: Jefa de Gabinete del Viceministerio Relaciones Económicas y Comercio Exterior) in the foreign ministry under President Evo Morales. She also worked in the Water Ministry.

She resigned from the post of minister of defense during the 2011 Bolivian protests in reaction to the government's violent crackdown on demonstrators opposed to a highway project in a national park.
