= Coordinator of Indigenous Organizations of the Amazon River Basin =

Coordinates national Amazonian indigenous organizations

COICA logo

Coordinator of Indigenous Organizations of the Amazon River Basin (COICA) (Spanish: Coordinadora de las Organizaciones Indígenas de la Cuenca Amazónica) was founded in 1984 in Lima, Peru. This organization coordinates the following nine national Amazonian indigenous organizations:

- Asociación Interétnica de Desarrollo de la Selva Peruana (AIDESEP)
- Amerindian People's Association of Guyana (APA)
- Confederación de Pueblos Indígenas de Bolivia (CIDOB)
- Coordenação das Organizações Indígenas da Amazônia Brasileira (COIAB)
- Confederation of Indigenous Nationalities of the Ecuadorian Amazonia (CONFENIAE)
- Regional Organization of Indigenous Towns of the Amazon (ORPIA)
- Federation des Organisations Amerindiennes de Guyane (FOAG)
- Organisatie van Inheemsen in Suriname (OIS)
- Organization of the Indigenous Towns of the Colombian Amazonia

The objectives of the COICA organization are to promote and develop mechanisms that encourage the interaction of Indigenous peoples with the member organizations of COICA, to defend the self-determination of Indigenous peoples, to respect the human rights of its members, to coordinate the actions of its members on an international level, to fortify and cultivate mutual collaboration between all Indigenous peoples of the region, and to promote the cultural vindication of its members. Some of the initiatives that COICA has been able to accomplish include allowing indigenous peoples to be educated in their native languages and the foundation of an Amazon Indigenous University. Accomplishments such as these have encouraged the revitalization of traditional cultures. In 1993, COICA's headquarters was permanently relocated to Quito, Ecuador. Here the organization has received legal recognition by the Ecuadorian state.

== See also ==
- Amazon Conservation Team (ACT)
- Amazon Watch
