= Isabel Ortega =

Bolivian politician (born 1953)

Isabel Ortega Ventura (born 20 December 1954) is a Bolivian Aymara-Quechua politician. She was born in 1954 in Ventilla Pongo, Cercado Province, Oruro Department. She worked as a farmer and was involved in union activities. Ortega Ventura has also held leadership positions in Federación Sindical Originaria Regional de Caracollo. In 2010, she became the Vice Minister of Justice for Indigenous People.
