= 2011 Bolivian judicial election =

The first Bolivian judicial election was held on 16 October 2011. The national vote was held to elect magistrates to serve on the Supreme Court of Justice, the Plurinational Constitutional Court, the Agro-environmental Court and members of the Judiciary Council. It was originally scheduled to be held on 5 December 2010, but officials of the National Electoral Court and of the MAS majority in the Plurinational Legislative Assembly delayed it. The vote will be the first time that a Latin American country directly elects its highest judicial officials.

== Background ==
The governing MAS party said the vote would make judges more accountable ad improve the efficacy of the judicial process. However, the opposition parties urged voters to either abstain or leave the ballots blank on the grounds that the election could "erode the independence of the judiciary" and strengthen President Evo Morales as 114 of the candidates were chosen by a Congress dominated by MAS. Previously judges had been directly elected by the Congress.

== Candidates ==
Proposed Supreme Court magistrates must be approved as qualified by a two-thirds vote of the Plurinational Legislative Assembly. Candidates are forbidden from campaigning and from affiliating with political parties.

== Election ==
Over 5,000,000 people registered to vote.

Ipsos Apoyo said that with 76.2% of votes counted, between 46% and 48% of votes cast were invalid, while valid votes accounted for about 38%, with the remaining ballots left blank. Absenteeism was roughly 20%. It was read as a setback for Morales, particularly in light of the 2011 Bolivian protests.

=== Plurinational Constitutional Court ===
The elected members of the Plurinational Constitutional Court are (in order of total votes received): Gualberto Cusi, Efren Choque, Ligia Velásquez, Mirta Camacho, Ruddy José Flores, Neldy Andrade, Soraida Chávez. The elected alternate members are: Macario Lahor Cortez, Milton Mendoza, Juan Valencia, Blanca Alarcón, Carmen Sandoval, Edith Oroz Carrasco, and Zenón Bacarreza.

=== Supreme Court of Justice ===
The Supreme Court of Justice is made up of nine members and nine alternates, representing the nine departments of Bolivia. The elected members are: Maritza Suntura (La Paz), Jorge Isaac Von Borries Méndez (Santa Cruz), Rómulo Calle Mamani (Oruro), Pastor Segundo Mamani Villca (Potosí), Antonio Guido Campero Segovia (Tarija), Gonzalo Miguel Hurtado Zamorano (Beni); Fidel Marcos Tordoya Rivas (Cochabamba), Rita Susana Nava Durán (Chuquisaca), and Norka Natalia Mercado Guzmán (Pando).

The elected alternates are: William Alave (La Paz), María Arminda Ríos García (Santa Cruz), Ana Adela Quispe Cuba (Oruro), Elisa Sánchez Mamani (Potosí), Carmen Núñez Villegas (Tarija), Silvana Rojas Panoso (Beni); María Lourdes Bustamante (Cochabamba), Javier Medardo Serrano Llanos (Chuquisaca), and Delfín Humberto Betancour Chinchilla (Pando).

=== Agro-Environmental Court ===
The elected members of the Agro-environmental Court are (in order of total votes received): Bernardo Huarachi, Deysi Villagómez, Gabriela Armijo Paz, Javier Peñafiel, Juan Ricardo Soto, Lucio Fuentes, and Yola Paucara. The elected alternate members are: Isabel Ortuño, Lidia Chipana, Mario Pacosillo, Katia López, Javier Aramayo, Miriam Pacheco, and Rommy Colque.

=== Judiciary Council ===
The elected members of the Judiciary Council are (in order of total votes received): Cristina Mamani, Freddy Sanabria, Wilma Mamani, Roger Triveño, and Ernesto Araníbar.
