= Censorship in Bolivia =

Censorship in Bolivia can be traced back through years of conflict between Bolivia's indigenous population and the wealthier population of European descent. Until Bolivia democratized in 1982, the media was strictly controlled.

== Media ==
=== Film ===
Film and documentary makers in Bolivia and other Latin American countries struggle to make a living creating film, find a large enough audience for their movies, and make their movies impactful yet non-offensive. In Bolivia and Argentina filmmakers have been forced to flee the country as a result of film and censorship laws. In the extreme, documentary film makers in Bolivia have been arrested for defamation in their films.

=== Radio ===
Within Bolivia, powerful, wealthy families with connections to the country's traditional political groups control the majority, around 80 percent, of radio stations although there are still a handful of stations run by local organizations, government, or other groups. Independent community stations are about four percent of the total number of radio stations. These stations have gained popularity with Morales as an indigenous president, and these stations are overall more popular within indigenous communities. They have a history of serving as a way for marginalized communities to express their identity and dislike of authoriarianism.

=== Newspapers ===
Historically, newspapers in Bolivia have been the root and voice of political opposition with the goal of challenging the current and past political leadership. Yet there are many difficulties related to running a newspaper in Bolivia as challenging the political leadership does not lead to high levels of job security and a secure income. Journalists want better working conditions, job training, for media to be free an unrestrained by the government and financial considerations. There is little advertising for newspapers partly due to low literacy levels. While there have been fewer attacks on journalists, there are still many cases that are waiting to work their way through the court system. Gradual improvements in internet access will lead to new environments and opportunities for newspapers and media in Bolivia.

=== Internet ===
In June 2017, Bolivia joined 16 other countries in rejecting a UN Human Rights Commission resolution affirming the right to a free, uncensored internet". However, the Bolivian state practices little internet censorship.

== Legal ==
=== Anti-racism law ===
As a result of historically racist communication between Bolivians of European descent and indigenous Bolivians, Morales created an anti-racism law that prevents against publishing racist media with the goal of protecting indigenous communities. The bill was signed into law on October 8, 2010. Upon its adoption, critics claimed that the law defined "racism" too loosely. The bill was passed during protests by media outlets, who expressed concern over the possibility that the bill could be abused in order to censor or close media outlets that criticize the government. Despite the protests, the bill was passed without amendments.

As of February 2014, no convictions under the anti-racism had been recorded. Due to this lack of convictions, the legislation has been widely criticized by the Bolivian media as being a dead letter.

=== Social media monitoring ===
In the past couple of years, Morales has tweeted and talked about the possibility of regulating social media, but he was faced with strong opposition and proceeded to abandon the plan. The idea of this stemmed from tweets that Morales saw as bullying or threatening to his reputation. The opposition's case was that there were many more possible opportunities for the government to utilize and embrace social media rather than censor it and be afraid of it. They were also afraid that the proposed social media regulation law would resemble the anti-racism bill's vague and broad language.
