= National Coordinator for Change =

The National Coordinator for Change (Spanish: Coordinadora Nacional por el Cambio; CONALCAM) is a Bolivian political coordination of social movements aligned with the governing Movement for Socialism-Political Instrument for the Sovereignty of the Peoples (MAS-IPSP). It was founded on 22 January 2007, during the Constituent Assembly of 2006-2007. CONALCAM mobilizes its member organizations in support of the "process of change" which includes the drafting and implementing of a new Constitution as well as a variety of social reforms.

== Structure ==
According to the organization's statute in September 2010, CONALCAM is made up of the following parts: the President and Vice President of the Plurinational State of Bolivia, social movement organizations, the national leadership of MAS-IPSP, and the parliamentary brigade of MAS-IPSP members in the Plurinational Legislative Assembly.

CONALCAM is governed by a National Leadership (Spanish: Dirección Nacional), elected once every two years with the following seven offices: President; General Secretary; Secretaries of Political Affairs, Organic (i.e., Internal) Affairs, International Affairs, and of Resolutions; and a Spokesperson.

In 2010, the organization moved to increase its local and regional activities and incorporated into its statute Departmental and Regional organizations: CODECAMs and CORECAMs.

=== Member organizations ===
As of September 2010, there are twenty national social movement organizations affiliated with CONALCAM, including the Constituent Assembly. Among these organizations are:

- Unique Confederation of Rural Laborers of Bolivia (CSUTCB)
- National Confederation of Peasant Indigenous Originary Women of Bolivia - Bartolina Sisa
- Syndicalist Confederation of Intercultural Communities of Bolivia (CSCIB)
- Confederation of Indigenous Peoples of Bolivia (CIDOB)
- National Council of Ayllus and Markas of Qullasuyu (CONAMAQ)
- General Confederation of Factory Workers of Bolivia

Conalcam also includes mining cooperatives, leftwing parties, vendors' guilds, neighbourhood associations, associations of small business enterprises, youth organizations and popular civic committees.

== Mobilizations ==
CONALCAM was the key mobilizing organization for supporters of the MAS and the draft constitution during the 2008 unrest in Bolivia. In October 2008, it organized a march from Caracollo to La Paz to pressure the National Congress to authorize a referendum on the new constitution, which the Congress did on October 21, as tens of thousands of protesters flooded central La Paz.
