= National Council of Ayllus and Markas of Qullasuyu =

Council of indigenous governing bodies in Bolivia

CONAMAQ
- National Council of Ayllus and Markas of Qullasuyu
- Consejo Nacional de Ayllus y Markas del Qullasuyu
- Banner of the Qulla Suyu
- Founded: 22 March 1997
- Headquarters: La Paz, Bolivia
- Location: Bolivia
- Key people: Sergio Hinojosa Singuri, Jiliri Apu Mallku; Herminia Colque, Jiliri Mama T’alla
- Affiliations: Andean Coordination of Indigenous Organizations (COAI)
- Website: http://www.conamaq.org

The National Council of Ayllus and Markas of Qullasuyu (Quechua: Qullasuyu Ayllukunap Markakunap Mamallaqta Kunaqnin; Spanish: Consejo Nacional de Ayllus y Markas del Qullasuyu; CONAMAQ) is a confederation of traditional governing bodies of Quechua-, Aymara- and Uru-speaking highland indigenous communities in the Bolivian departments of La Paz, Oruro, Potosí, Cochabamba, Chuquisaca and Tarija. Specifically, it represents the following 16 suyus: Jacha Carangas, Jatun Quillacas, Asamajaquis, Charcas Qara Qara, Council of Ayllus of Potosí, Qara Qara Suyu, Sora, Kallawaya, Leco, Larecaja, Colla, Chui, Paca Jake, Ayllus of Cochabamba, Kapaj Omasuyus and Yapacaní. CONAMAQ was founded on March 22, 1997, with the purpose of restoring the self-governance of "original nations" including "collective rights to land and natural resources, re-definition of administrative units and self-determination exercised through indigenous autonomies and direct representation in state institutions." CONAMAQ is a member of the National Coordination for Change, and of the Andean Coordination of Indigenous Organizations. It was a member of the Pact of Unity in Bolivia from its founding until December 2011.

== Structure and Leadership ==
The organization's maximum governing body is its Jach'a Tantachawi, or Congress, six of which have been held so far, most recently in August 2009 in Oruro. These gatherings elect a leadership which includes two pairs of men and women: the Jiliri Apu Mallku and Jiliri Mama T’alla (first male and female leaders) and Arquiri Apu Mallku and Arquiri Mama T’alla (second male and female leaders). While theoretically equal, the male leaders represent the organization more often.

Term	Chosen by	Jiliri Apu Mallku	Jiliri Mama T’alla	Representing	Arquiri Apu Mallku	Arquiri Mama T’alla	Representing
1997–2000	First Jacha T'antachawi, March 1997	Vicente Choqueticlla	Segundina Quispe	FASOR (now Jatun Killakas)	Simon Cusi Cusi		Pakajaqi
2001–2003		Faustino Zegarra	Juana Calle Apata	Jach’a Karanga			
2003–2005		Vicente Flores Romero	Lorenza Mostacedo	Qhara Qhara	Antonio Machaka Ajhuachu	Daria Chambi Cotaña	Sura
2005–2007		Martin Condori Flores	Erminia Sandoval Mamani	FAOI-NP	Mauricio Arias Alave	Maria Delgado Cunurana	Ayllus of Cochabamba
2007–2009		Elías Quelca Mamani	Ana Nieves Tarqui de Quelca	Pakajaqi	Domingo Cuentas Huayllani	Natalia Pizarro Morales	Killaka Asanajaqi (JAKISA)
2009–2011		Sergio Hinojosa Singuri	Herminia Colque	Council of Ayllus of Potosí	Gavino Apata	Uvaldina Quispe	Carangas Suyu of Oruro
2011–2013	VII Jacha T'antachawi	Félix Becerra	Gabina Coro de Becerra	Sura Aransaya	Froilán Puma Carmona	Elva Colque Puma	Qhara Qhara Suyu

=== Internal conflict ===
Long a close ally of the government of Evo Morales, CONAMAQ became increasingly critical of it from 2011 onwards. The organization co-sponsored the Eight Grand National Indigenous March with the Confederation of Indigenous Peoples of Bolivia (CIDOB), backing the right of indigenous communities in the Isiboro Sécure National Park and Indigenous Territory to refuse a highway project through their land. Following the government's failed attempt to stop the march on September 25, 2011, CONAMAQ's leadership took an overtly critical tone toward the government, and left the pro-government Pact of Unity by a decision taken at its Seventh Jach'a T'antachawi. Under the leadership of Felix Becerra, CONAMAQ continued to coordinate closely with CIDOB and to jointly advance a draft law on indigenous consultation authorizing local indigenous communities to exercise free, prior, and informed consent over projects on their lands.

In 2013, several pro-government indigenous leaders, among them Hilarion Mamani Navarro (cacique mayor of Chichas, in Potosí Department) and Gregorio Choque Quispe (apu mallku of Kapaomasuyu, in La Paz department) campaigned to realign the movement with the government, demanding early elections to replace its national leaders. They are joined by Félix Lira of Charcas Qhara Qhara, Potosí; Jhonny Huanca of Larecaja, La Paz; Plácido Suntura of Jach’a Pakajaqi, La Paz; and Afro-Bolivian Renán Paco. These leaders and their supporters briefly took over CONAMAQ's office in September, one of six attempts they made to do so. In December, the pro-government faction and the existing organization each held an Eighth Jach'a T'antachawi in La Paz, the former on December 9 and 10, and the latter on December 12 and 13. The pro-government gathering designated Mamani and Choque as senior male leaders of the organization. The organization's Jach'a T'antachawi, organized by the incumbent leadership, designated Freddy Bernabé as its leader, with Cancio Rojas as the second male leader. On January 14, 2014, the pro-government faction, helped by the police, took the office of the organic CONAMAQ over by force. The National Assembly of Human Rights of La Paz granted the organic leaders a temporary office space, but days later the pro-governmental faction, again helped by the police, invaded this office too, and the organic CONAMAQ leaders had to vacate the office space that the Assembly of Human Rights of La Paz had given to them.

The Bernabé-led organization is recognized by the Andean Coordination of Indigenous Organizations and the Coordination of Indigenous Organizations of the Amazon Basin. The Pact of Unity recognizes Hilarion Mamani's leadership of CONAMAQ.

== See also ==
- Ayllu
- Apu Mallku
- Qollasuyu
