= 1933 in Bolivia =

- Decades: 1910s; 1920s; 1930s; 1940s; 1950s
- See also: Other events of 1933; History of Bolivia • Years

Events in the year 1933 in Bolivia.

== Incumbents ==
- President: Daniel Salamanca Urey
- Vice President: José Luis Tejada Sorzano

== Events ==
- January 20–26 - First Battle of Nanawa
- February - Battle of Campo Jordán
- May - Bolivian legislative election, 1933
- July 4–9 - Second Battle of Nanawa
- August 30-September 15 - Battle of Campo Grande
- November–December - Campo Vía pocket

== See also ==
- Chaco War
