= 1934 in Bolivia =

- Decades: 1910s; 1920s; 1930s; 1940s; 1950s
- See also: Other events of 1934; History of Bolivia • Years

== Incumbents ==
- President: Daniel Salamanca Urey until November 27, José Luis Tejada Sorzano from December 1
- Vice President: José Luis Tejada Sorzano until November 27

== Events ==
- May 10–25 - Battle of Cañada Strongest
- November 27 - President Salamanca deposed by generals in coup d'état

== Births ==
- January 20 - Óscar Zamora Medinaceli, Bolivian politician, lawyer (d. 2017)

== See also ==
- Chaco War
