= 2007 in Bolivia =

- Decades: 1980s; 1990s; 2000s; 2010s; 2020s
- See also: Other events of 2007; History of Bolivia • Years

Events from the year 2007 in Bolivia

== Incumbents ==
- President: Evo Morales
- Vice President: Álvaro García Linera

== Events ==
=== January ===
- January 9: Amauris Samartino Flores, a Cuban refugee is expelled.

=== February ===
- February 3: A State of Emergency is declared in Bolivia after 'El Niño'-like flooding.
- February 20: At least 35 people have died and up to 340,000 are affected by flooding after months of heavy rain in Bolivia. The eastern departments of Santa Cruz and Beni are the worst affected.
- February 28: The President of Bolivia Evo Morales declares the Bolivian floods as a national disaster with 35 deaths and 72,000 people becoming homeless.

=== March ===
- March 16: The Inter-American Development Bank forgives US$4.4 billion in debt owed by Bolivia, Honduras, Nicaragua, Haiti and Guyana, five of the poorest countries in the Americas.

=== June ===
- June 26: Bolivia reclaims two oil refineries from Brazilian state-owned energy company Petrobras.

=== July ===
- July 20: Hundreds of thousands of Bolivians protest proposals to shift the capital from La Paz to Sucre.

=== August ===
- August 10: The President of Venezuela Hugo Chávez meets with the President of Bolivia Evo Morales and the President of Argentina Néstor Kirchner in Tarija, Bolivia.

=== November ===
- November 26: At least three people die in clashes over a new draft constitution in Sucre, Bolivia.

=== December ===
- December 17: The leaders of Brazil, Bolivia, and Chile agree to build a highway by 2009 that will link the Atlantic (in Santos, Brazil) and the Pacific (in Iquique, Chile) coasts of South America.
- December 17: The Bolivian departments of Beni, Pando, Santa Cruz, and Tarija declare autonomy from Evo Morales' central government.

== Deaths ==
- November 23: Óscar Carmelo Sánchez, 36, footballer, cancer.
