= 1828 in Bolivia =

- Decades: 1800s; 1810s; 1820s; 1830s; 1840s
- See also: Other events of 1828; History of Bolivia • Years

Events in the year 1828 in Bolivia.

== Incumbents ==
- President:
  - Antonio José de Sucre (until 18 April)
  - José María Pérez de Urdininea (acting: 18 April–2 August)
  - José Miguel de Velasco (acting: 2 August–18 December) (Note: As vice president; exerts command pending the arrival of the president-designate Andrés de Santa Cruz, who did not arrive (Gaceta Oficial 12 Aug 1828a).)
  - José Ramón de Loayza (acting: 18–26 December) (Note: As vice president; exerts command pending the arrival of the president-designate (Mesa 2003, p. 247).)
  - Pedro Blanco Soto (provisional: starting 26 December)
- Vice President:
  - Vacant (until 26 December)
    - José Miguel de Velasco (designate: 12 August–18 December)
    - José Ramón de Loayza (designate: 18–26 December)
  - José Ramón de Loayza (provisional: starting 26 December)

== Ongoing events ==
- Peruvian–Bolivian War (1828)

== Events ==
=== April ===
- 18 April – Military mutiny in Chuquisaca. President Antonio José de Sucre is wounded and delegates command to President of the Council of Ministers José María Pérez de Urdininea.
- 30 April – The revolt in Chuquisaca is quelled.

=== May ===
- 1 May – Peruvian–Bolivian War: Peruvian forces under Agustín Gamarra cross the Desaguadero River into Bolivia, seeking to expel Gran Colombian influence in the country.

=== July ===
- 6 July – Peruvian–Bolivian War: The Treaty of Piquiza is signed between Sucre and Gamarra. Gran Colombian troops are required to withdraw while Peruvian troops will remain for some time.

=== August ===
- 2 August – President Sucre presents his definitive resignation to Congress. Simultaneously, a new cabinet is appointed by decree, presided by José Miguel de Velasco.
- 12 August – Andrés de Santa Cruz and José Miguel de Velasco are elected provisional president and vice president by the General Constituent Congress. Velasco assumes command pending the arrival of Santa Cruz.

=== December ===
- 18 December – Given the continued absence of Santa Cruz, the Congress reconvenes and elects Pedro Blanco Soto and José Ramón de Loayza provisional president and vice president, in the framework of an assembly dominated by the interests of Agustín Gamarra and the Peruvian Army.
- 31 December – President Blanco is arrested by anti-Peruvian rebels.

== Deaths ==
- 30 April – José Miguel García Lanza, guerilla. (b. 1791)

== Bibliography ==
- "Decreto Supremo de 18 March 1828". Gaceta Oficial del Estado Plurinacional de Bolivia (in Spanish). 18 April 1828.
- "Ley de 12 July 1828". Gaceta Oficial del Estado Plurinacional de Bolivia (in Spanish). 12 August 1828a.
- "Ley de 12 July 1828". Gaceta Oficial del Estado Plurinacional de Bolivia (in Spanish). 12 August 1828b.
- "Ley de 12 July 1828". Gaceta Oficial del Estado Plurinacional de Bolivia (in Spanish). 12 August 1828c.
- Mesa Gisbert, Carlos D. (2003). Presidentes de Bolivia: entre urnas y fusiles | El poder ejecutivo: los ministros de estado (in Spanish) (Third ed.). La Paz: Editorial Gisbert.
- Representacion al Soberano Congreso del Perú, en la presente lejislatura por la H. Cámara de senadores (in Spanish). 1832. pp. 23–24.
