= 2016 in Bolivia =

- Decades: 1990s; 2000s; 2010s; 2020s
- See also: Other events of 2016; History of Bolivia • Years

Events in the year 2016 in Bolivia.

== Incumbents ==
- President: Evo Morales
- Vice President: Álvaro García Linera

== Events ==
- 21 February – A constitutional referendum results in a majority against allowing president Evo Morales to run for a fourth term.

=== Sport ===
- Continuing from 2015 – the 2015–16 Liga de Fútbol Profesional Boliviano season
- 6–14 June – the Bolivia national football team took part in the Copa América Centenario Group D
- 5–21 August – Bolivia at the 2016 Summer Olympics: 12 competitors in 5 sports
- Continuing into 2017 – the 2016–17 Liga de Fútbol Profesional Boliviano season

== Deaths ==
- 18 January – Armando Loaiza, diplomat and politician (b. 1943).
- 13 March – Beatriz Canedo Patiño, fashion designer (b. 1950).
- 17 June – Angel Gelmi Bertocchi, Roman Catholic bishop (b. 1938).
- 25 August – Rodolfo Illanes, lawyer and politician (b. 1958; murdered)
- 25 September – David Padilla, military officer and politician (b. 1927)
- 27 September – Luis Ossio, politician (b. 1930)
- 5 December – Julia Elena Fortún, historian, anthropologist, folklorist, and ethnomusicologist (b. 1929)
