= 2019 in Bolivia =

- Decades: 1990s; 2000s; 2010s; 2020s
- See also: Other events of 2019; History of Bolivia • Years

Events in the year 2019 in Bolivia.

== Incumbents ==
- President: Evo Morales (until 10 November), Jeanine Áñez (Interim president) (starting 10 November)
- Vice President: Álvaro García Linera (until 10 November), vacant thereafter

== Events ==
- October – Scheduled date for the 2019 Bolivian general election

== Deaths ==
- 14 January – Gonzalo Ramiro del Castillo Crespo, Roman Catholic prelate, Bishop of Military (b. 1936).
- 15 January – Mario Monje, politician (b. 1929 or 1930).
- 18 May – Mario Baudoin, biologist (b. 1942)
- 25 August – Jenaro Flores Santos, trade unionist and politician, founder of Unified Syndical Confederation of Rural Workers of Bolivia (b. 1942)

== See also ==
- 2019 Pan American Games
