= 1959 in Bolivia =

- Decades: 1930s; 1940s; 1950s; 1960s; 1970s
- See also: Other events of 1959; History of Bolivia • Years

Events in the year 1959 in Bolivia.

== Incumbents ==
- President: Hernán Siles Zuazo (MNR)
- Vice President: Vacant

== Ongoing events ==
- Bolivian National Revolution (1952–1964)

== Events ==
- 19 April – An attempted coup d'état led by the Bolivian Socialist Falange (FSB) fails to depose President Siles Zuazo and ends in the suicide of the FSB's leader.

== Births ==
- 5 June – Betty Tejada, president of the Chamber of Deputies from 2013 to 2014.

== Deaths ==
- 19 April – Óscar Únzaga, 43, leader of the Bolivian Socialist Falange (b. 1916)
