= 1869 in Bolivia =

- Decades: 1840s; 1850s; 1860s; 1870s; 1880s
- See also: Other events of 1869; History of Bolivia • Years

Events in the year 1869 in Bolivia.

== Incumbents ==
- President: Mariano Melgarejo

== Births ==
- July 8 - Daniel Salamanca Urey, President 1931-1934

== Deaths ==
Dámaso Bilbao la Vieja
