= 1982 in Bolivia =

- Decades: 1960s; 1970s; 1980s; 1990s; 2000s
- See also: Other events of 1982; History of Bolivia • Years

The following is a list of events in the year 1982 in Bolivia.

== Incumbents ==
- President:
  - Celso Torrelio (until 19 July 1982)
  - Junta of Commanders of the Armed Forces of the Nation (19 July 1982 – 21 July 1982)
    - Ángel Mariscal
    - Natalio Morales
    - Óscar Pammo Rodríguez
  - Guido Vildoso (21 July 1982 – 10 October 1982)
  - Hernán Siles Zuazo (starting 10 October 1982)
- Vice President:
  - Vacant (until 10 October 1982)
  - Jaime Paz Zamora (starting 10 October 1982)

== Events ==
- 19 July – President Celso Torrelio resigns from office; the presidency is entrusted to a Junta of Commanders of the Armed Forces while a new executive is selected.
- 21 July – Brigadier General Guido Vildoso is appointed president by the military junta.
- 10 October – Hernán Siles Zuazo and Jaime Paz Zamora are sworn in as the constitutional president and vice president of the republic, completing Bolivia's transition back to democracy.

== Births ==
- 10 December – Nadia Cruz, lawyer, acting ombudsman of Bolivia.

== Deaths ==
- 24 January – Alfredo Ovando Candía, 63, 48th president of Bolivia (b. 1918)
