= 1838 in Bolivia =

- Decades: 1810s; 1820s; 1830s; 1840s; 1850s
- See also: Other events of 1838; History of Bolivia • Years

Events in the year 1838 in Bolivia.

== Incumbents ==
- President: Andrés de Santa Cruz (also Supreme Protector of the Peru-Bolivian Confederation)

== Events ==
- January 12–13 - War of the Confederation: Battle of Islay
- June 24 - War of the Confederation: Battle of Montenegro

== Births ==
- October 13 - Eduardo Abaroa
