= 1953 in Bolivia =

- Decades: 1930s; 1940s; 1950s; 1960s; 1970s
- See also: Other events of 1953; History of Bolivia • Years

Events in the year 1953 in Bolivia.

== Incumbents ==
- President: Víctor Paz Estenssoro (MNR)
- Vice President: Hernán Siles Zuazo (MNR)

== Ongoing events ==
- Bolivian National Revolution (1952–1964)

== Events ==
- 2 August – President Víctor Paz Estenssoro signs Supreme Decree N° 3464 into law, passing sweeping agrarian reform and declaring peasants the owners of their own lands.

== Births ==
- 12 August – Carlos Mesa, 63rd president of Bolivia, 37th vice president of Bolivia.
