= 1826 in Bolivia =

- Decades: 1800s; 1810s; 1820s; 1830s; 1840s
- See also: Other events of 1826; History of Bolivia • Years

Events in the year 1826 in Bolivia. The 1826 Constitution, the first constitution of Bolivia, was promulgated in November of this year.

== Incumbents ==
- Head of State (through 19 June): (Note: The title of "President of the Republic" was not formally established until 19 June 1826. Bolívar and Sucre are generally regarded as the first and second presidents of Bolivia, respectively.) Antonio José de Sucre
- President (beginning from 19 June): Antonio José de Sucre
- Vice President (beginning from 19 November): Vacant
- Congress: General Constituent Congress

== Events ==
=== January ===
- 13 January – The Army Secretariat is divided into two: one of the government and finance sections and the other military.

=== May ===
9 December: Antonio José de Sucre becomes the first Constitutional President of the Republic.

- 25 May
  - The General Constituent Congress convenes in Chuquisaca.
  - The State of Upper Peru, or Republic of Bolívar becomes the Bolivian Republic.
- 26 May – The General Constituent Congress formally entrusts the powers of the executive branch to Antonio José de Sucre.
- 28 May – Sucre is sworn in as head of the republic in a formal ceremony.

=== June ===
- 19 June – The limits of executive power, which since 26 May have been entrusted to Sucre, are established by the General Constituent Congress. "President of the Republic" is established as the title of the head of state.

=== July ===
- 1 July – Chuquisaca (Sucre) is established as the capital of Bolivia.

=== November ===
- 6 November – The General Constituent Congress sanctions the 1826 Constitution.
- 19 November – President Sucre promulgates the 1826 Political Constitution of the State, declaring it to be in effect.

=== December ===
- 9 December – President Sucre is sworn in as the Constitutional President of the Republic.

== Bibliography ==
- "Constitución Política del Estado 1826". Gaceta Oficial del Estado Plurinacional de Bolivia (in Spanish). 6 November 1826.
- "Decreto Supremo de 13 de enero de 1826". Gaceta Oficial del Estado Plurinacional de Bolivia (in Spanish). 13 January 1826.
- "Decreto Supremo de 9 March 1826". Gaceta Oficial del Estado Plurinacional de Bolivia (in Spanish). 9 April 1826.
- "Ley de 1 June 1826". Gaceta Oficial del Estado Plurinacional de Bolivia (in Spanish). 1 July 1826.
- "Ley de 19 May 1826". Gaceta Oficial del Estado Plurinacional de Bolivia (in Spanish). 19 June 1826.
- "Ley de 19 October 1826". Gaceta Oficial del Estado Plurinacional de Bolivia (in Spanish). 19 November 1826.
- "Ley de 26 April 1826". Gaceta Oficial del Estado Plurinacional de Bolivia (in Spanish). 26 May 1826.
- "Ley de 27 April 1826". Gaceta Oficial del Estado Plurinacional de Bolivia (in Spanish). 27 May 1826.
- Mesa Gisbert, Carlos D. (2003). Presidentes de Bolivia: entre urnas y fusiles | El poder ejecutivo: los ministros de estado (in Spanish) (Third ed.). La Paz: Editorial Gisbert.
