= 1872 in Bolivia =

- Decades: 1850s; 1860s; 1870s; 1880s; 1890s
- See also: Other events of 1872; History of Bolivia • Years

== Incumbents ==
- President: Agustín Morales until November 27, Tomás Frías

== Deaths ==
- November 27 – Agustín Morales (shot and killed by nephew Frederico Lafaye)
