= 1939 in Bolivia =

- Decades: 1910s; 1920s; 1930s; 1940s; 1950s
- See also: Other events of 1939; History of Bolivia • Years

Events in the year 1939 in Bolivia.

== Incumbents ==
- President: Germán Busch (until 23 August), Carlos Quintanilla (Interim president) (starting 23 August)
- Vice President: Enrique Baldivieso (PSU) (until 24 April), vacant (until 4 December), none (starting 4 December)

== Events ==
- 24 April – President Germán Busch dismisses the assembly and declares dictatorial rule.
- 23 August – President Germán Busch commits suicide by gunshot. The armed forces appoints the commander-in-chief of the army General Carlos Quintanilla interim president.
- 6 October – General elections are called for 10 March 1940.
- 4 December – The office of vice president is abolished by decree in order to circumvent claims of constitutional succession by former vice president Enrique Baldivieso.

== Births ==
- 15 April – Jaime Paz Zamora, 32nd Vice President of Bolivia, 60th President of Bolivia

== Deaths ==
- 1 May – Bautista Saavedra, 29th President of Bolivia (b. 1870)
- 23 August – Germán Busch, 36th President of Bolivia (b. 1904)
- 12 September – Eliodoro Villazón, 27th President of Bolivia, oldest living state leader to that point (b.1848)
