= 1896 in Bolivia =

- Decades: 1870s; 1880s; 1890s; 1900s; 1910s
- See also: Other events of 1896; History of Bolivia • Years

Events in the year 1896 in Bolivia.

== Incumbents ==
- President: Mariano Baptista until August 19, Severo Fernández

== Events ==
- May 26 - founding of Oruro Royal

== Deaths ==
- August 12 - Narciso Campero
