= 1894 in Bolivia =

- Decades: 1870s; 1880s; 1890s; 1900s; 1910s
- See also: Other events of 1894; History of Bolivia • Years

Events from the year 1894 in Bolivia.

== Incumbents ==
- President: Mariano Baptista

== Deaths ==
- February 27 - Hilarión Daza
