= 1882 in Bolivia =

- Decades: 1860s; 1870s; 1880s; 1890s; 1900s
- See also: Other events of 1882; History of Bolivia • Years

Events in the year 1882 in Bolivia.

== Incumbents ==
- President: Narciso Campero

== Births ==
- January 12 - José Luis Tejada Sorzano, President 1934-1936
