= 1936 in Bolivia =

- Decades: 1910s; 1920s; 1930s; 1940s; 1950s
- See also: Other events of 1936; History of Bolivia • Years

Events in the year 1936 in Bolivia.

== Incumbents ==
- President:
  - until 17 May: José Luis Tejada Sorzano (PL)
  - 17–22 May: Germán Busch
  - starting 22 May: David Toro

== Events ==
- 15 March: United Socialist Party (PSU) is founded as a result of a split in the Nationalist Party.
- 17 May: Following a series of general strikes, the military under Germán Busch, supported by the United Socialist Party and trade unions, overthrows the government of José Luis Tejada Sorzano and installs David Toro and president.
- 1–16 August: Bolivia competes in the Summer Olympic Games for the first time at the 1936 Summer Olympics in Berlin, Germany.
