= Pocket (military) =

Military forces isolated from their logistical base

A map of the Eastern Front during the Battle of Moscow in World War II, showing pockets of Soviet resistance to the Nazi advance

A pocket is a group of combat forces that have been isolated by opposing forces from their logistical base and other friendly forces. In mobile warfare, such as blitzkrieg, salients were more likely to be cut off into pockets, which became the focus of battles of annihilation.

The term pocket carries connotations that the encirclement was not intentionally allowed by the encircled forces, as it may have been when defending a fortified position, which is usually called a siege. That is a similar distinction to that made between a skirmish and pitched battle.

== Implementation ==
=== Soviet military doctrine ===
Soviet military doctrine distinguishes several sizes of encirclement:

- Cauldron or kettle (Russian: котёл, romanized: kotyol; Ukrainian: котел, romanized: kotel): a very large, strategic-level concentration of trapped enemy forces
- Sack (Russian: мешок, romanized: meshok; Ukrainian: мішок, romanized: mishok): an operational-level trapped enemy force
- Nest (Russian: гнездо, romanized: gnezdo; Ukrainian: гніздо, romanized: hnizdo): a tactical-level trapped enemy force

The significance of these terms are reflected by the conception of what can be expected in combat in encirclement operations. A cauldron is expected to be "boiling" with combat activity, the large enemy forces still quite able to offer "hot" resistance in the initial stages of encirclement, and so are to be contained, but not engaged directly. A sack in Soviet experience was often created as a result of operational breakthroughs, and was sometimes as unexpected for the Soviet command as for the enemy. This encirclement, sometimes of an entity of unknown size, tended to move for some time after the initial encirclement due to inherently dynamic nature of operational warfare. By contrast a nest was a reference to a tactical, well-defined and contained encirclement of enemy troops that was seen as a fragile construct of enemy troops unsupported by its parent formation (the use of the word nest is similar to the more familiar English expression machine gun nest).

=== Kessel ===
In German the word Kessel (cognate with kettle) is commonly used to refer to an encircled military force, and a Kesselschlacht ("cauldron battle") refers to a pincer movement. The common tactic which would leave a Kessel is referred to as Keil und Kessel (Keil meaning "wedge"). Kessel is a loanword in English texts about World War II. Another use of Kessel is Kessel fever, the panic and hopelessness felt by any troops who were surrounded with little or no chance of escape.

'Kettling' is also used to refer to a police tactic in which police surround groups of protesters to contain their activities.

=== Cerco ===
In Spanish the word Cerco (literally a fence or siege) is commonly used to refer to an encircling military force. Cercos were particularly common in the Chaco War between Bolivia and Paraguay (1932–1935) and encirclement battles were decisive for the outcome of the war. In the Campo Vía pocket 7,500 Bolivians were taken prisoner out of an initial combat force of 10,000. Other cercos of the war include the battle of Campo Grande and the battle of Cañada Strongest.

=== Motti ===
Motti is Finnish military slang for a totally encircled enemy unit. The tactic of encircling is called motitus, literally meaning the formation of an isolated block or "motti", but in effect meaning an entrapment or envelopment.

The word means "mug" in many Finnish dialects; an alternate translation refers to a cubic meter of firewood, a relatively small area in which an encircled enemy could be "cut down" like trees. motti is thus related to kessel. A motti in military tactics therefore means the formation of "bite sized" enemy units which are easier to contain and deal with.

This tactic of envelopment was used extensively by the Finnish forces in the Winter War and the Continuation War to good effect. It was especially effective against some of the mechanized units of the Soviet Army, which were effectively restricted to the long and narrow forest roads with virtually no way other than forwards or backwards. Once committed to a road, the Soviet troops effectively were trapped. Unlike the mechanized units of the Soviets, the Finnish troops could move quickly through the forests on skis and break columns of armoured Soviet units into smaller chunks (e.g., by felling trees along the road). Once the large column was split up into smaller armoured units, the Finnish forces attacking from within the forest could strike the weakened column. The smaller pockets of enemy troops could then be dealt with individually by concentrating forces on all sides against the entrapped unit.

A motitus is therefore a double envelopment manoeuvre, using the ability of light troops to travel over rough ground to encircle enemy troops on a road. Heavily outnumbered but mobile forces could easily immobilize an enemy many times more numerous.

By cutting the enemy columns or units into smaller groups and then encircling them with light and mobile forces, such as ski-troops during winter, a smaller force can overwhelm a much larger force. If the encircled enemy unit was too strong, or if attacking it would have entailed an unacceptably high cost, e.g., because of a lack of heavy equipment, the motti was usually left to "stew" until it ran out of food, fuel, supplies, and ammunition and was weakened enough to be eliminated. Some of the larger mottis held out until the end of the war because they were resupplied by air. Being trapped, however, these units were not available for battle operations.

The largest motti battles in the Winter War occurred at the Battle of Suomussalmi. Three Finnish regiments enveloped and destroyed two Soviet divisions as well as a tank brigade trapped on a road.

== Notable pockets ==
=== In World War II ===
- In the winter of 1939–1940, Finnish troops encircled in a series of coordinated assaults approx. 50,000 Red army soldiers in the Battle of Suomussalmi with Soviet casualties exceeding over 30,000, while Finnish casualties stayed relatively low, approx. 1,000 soldiers (estimates vary). Escaping Red army soldiers abandoned hundreds of weapons and vehicles which were later used by the Finnish forces.
- From June to December 1941, during Operation Barbarossa,
  - Almost the entire Soviet Western Front of over 420,000 was encircled and destroyed by the German Army Group Centre in the Battle of Bialystok-Minsk.
  - Later, 310,000 Soviet troops were captured in a pocket at Smolensk when isolated by the Panzer forces of Generals Heinz Guderian and Hermann Hoth on August 5, 1941.
  - During the Siege of Odessa, German and Romanian forces encircled and captured tens of thousands of Soviet troops.
  - At the end, most of the Soviet Southwestern Front (about 700,000 soldiers) was encircled in the First Battle of Kiev.
- During the Battle of Moscow, over one million Soviet troops were encircled and destroyed in the opening phase, with 600,000–700,000 of them becoming prisoners, and the rest being killed.
- In the winter of 1942, 100,000 German Wehrmacht troops were encircled in the Demyansk Pocket in northwestern Russia, but were relieved the following spring.
- In the winter of 1942, 5,500 German troops were encircled by the Soviets in the Kholm Pocket.
- In the spring of 1942, 277,000 Soviet troops engaged in an offensive thrust were encircled during the German counterattack in the Second Battle of Kharkov.
- In November 1942, during the Battle of Stalingrad, nearly all of the German Sixth Army of over 250,000 men was encircled and destroyed in Operation Uranus. The Italian Army in Russia and the Hungarian Second Army were similarly eliminated during Operation Little Saturn.
- In late 1942 and early 1943, some 50,000 German 3rd Panzer Army troops were, under much higher losses, encircled and annihilated by the Soviets in the Velikiye Luki Pocket.
- In early 1944 the German 8th Army was encircled in the Korsun Pocket; though could eventually break out with both sides suffering heavy losses.
- In March 1944 the 1st Panzer Army was trapped by the Soviets in the Kamenets-Podolsky pocket (or Hube's Pocket), but was able to inflict high losses and broke out.
- In May 1944, nearly half the German and Romanian garrison in the Crimean Peninsula were captured during the Crimean Offensive, primarily in Sevastopol.
- In June and July 1944, over 350,000–500,000 German troops were killed, wounded, or captured during Operation Bagration in modern Belarus.
- In August 1944, over 300,000 German and Romanian troops were overrun in the second Jassy–Kishinev Offensive in modern Romania.
- In August 1944, following the D-Day landings, the German 7th Army was trapped in the Falaise pocket.
- Also in September 1944, during the Battle of Arnhem, a reinforced British Airborne division was trapped in a pocket the Germans called the Hexenkessel (lit. 'witches' cauldron'), suffering over 8,000 casualties.
- In 1944, thousands of German troops were encircled by a Canadian Army force in the Breskens Pocket during the Battle of the Scheldt.
- In winter of 1944–1945, a large number of German Army Group Courland troops was isolated in the Courland Pocket in northwestern Latvia until the end of the war.
- In the same winter German troops were encircled in the Memel pocket; however, they eventually were evacuated by sea.
- Also during the winter of 1944–1945, nearly 300,000 German troops were overrun in the Vistula–Oder Offensive in modern Poland.
- In 1944–1945, 180,000 German and Hungarian troops were isolated by Soviet troops in the Siege of Budapest.
- In 1945 the German 9th Army was destroyed in the Battle of Halbe.
- In 1945, 325,000 German Army Group B troops were isolated and captured by advancing Twelfth United States Army Group in the Ruhr Pocket.
- In April and May 1945, over 85,000 German troops were encircled and destroyed in the Battle of Berlin and collapse of Nazi Germany.
- Finally in August 1945, over 700,000 Japanese and Manchurian troops were encircled over a broad area during the Soviet invasion of Manchuria.

=== Other pockets ===
- The Hornet's Nest during the Battle of Shiloh in the American Civil War, where two Union divisions were surrounded, cut off from the rest of the army, and held out against ferocious Confederate attacks for six hours before surrendering.
- Campo Vía in the Chaco War.
- In the Yugoslav Wars the Medak Pocket was a Serb-populated area in Croatia that was invaded by Croatians in September 1993.
- In the war in Donbas, Ukrainian troops were encircled at Ilovaisk in August 2014, suffering heavy material and human losses. Eight years later, following the escalated invasion by Russia in eastern and southern Ukraine starting February 24, in September 2022 the Armed Forces of Ukraine mounted a surprise counteroffensive, followed by the retaking of Lyman (Rus.: Liman), an established base and railway hub for the invading Russian forces, in a "cauldron/kettle"-scale encirclement operation.
- During the 2022 Russian invasion of Ukraine, Russian and DPR forces surrounded the city of Mariupol, trapping thousands of Ukrainian troops. Rather than surrender, the encircled troops continued fighting for over two months in what became the Siege of Mariupol, with heavy casualties inflicted on both sides.

== See also ==
- Blitzkrieg
- Deep Battle

== Sources ==
- Hayward, Joel (Spring 1997). "Stalingrad: An Examination of Hitler's Decision to Airlift" (PDF). Airpower Journal. 11 (1): 21–37.
