= 1871 in Bolivia =

- Decades: 1850s; 1860s; 1870s; 1880s; 1890s
- See also: Other events of 1871; History of Bolivia • Years

== Incumbents ==
- President: Mariano Melgarejo until January 15, Agustín Morales

== Deaths ==
- November 23 - Mariano Melgarejo (assassinated in Lima, Peru)
