= 1841 in Bolivia =

- Decades: 1820s; 1830s; 1840s; 1850s; 1860s
- See also: Other events of 1841; History of Bolivia • Years

Events in the year 1841 in Bolivia.

== Incumbents ==
- President:
  - José Miguel de Velasco (until 10 June)
  - Sebastián Ágreda (provisional: 10 June 1841 – 9 July) (Note: Acting for Andrés de Santa Cruz (in exile) who never took office (Mesa 2003, pp. 102–103).)
  - Mariano Enrique Calvo (acting: 9 July – 22 September)
  - Vacant (22–27 September)
  - José Ballivián (starting 27 September)

== Ongoing events ==
- Peruvian-Bolivian War (1841–1842)

== Events ==
=== June ===
- 10 June – President José Miguel de Velasco is ousted in a coup d'état by Sebastián Ágreda.

=== July ===
- 9 July – Ágreda delegates command to Mariano Enrique Calvo, pending the return of Andrés de Santa Cruz.

=== September ===
- 22 September – Calvo is ousted in a coup d'état by José Ballivián.
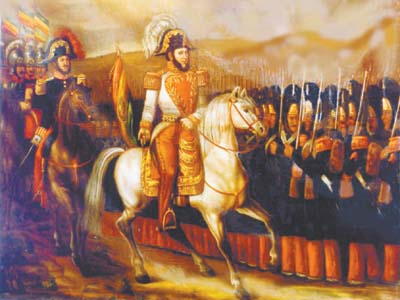
  18 November: Battle of Ingavi
- 27 September – José Ballivián is sworn-in to the presidency after five days of uncertainty.

=== October ===
- 1 October – Peruvian-Bolivian War: Peruvian President Agustín Gamarra begin the march to Bolivia.
- 2 October – Peruvian-Bolivian War: The Peruvian Army crosses the border onto Bolivian soil.
- 15 October – Peruvian-Bolivian War: Peruvian forces occupy La Paz without a fight.
- 29 October – Peruvian-Bolivian War – Battle of Mecapaca: Bolivian forces under Basilio Herrera attack those of Peru under Miguel de San Román but are repelled.

=== November ===
- 18 November – Peruvian-Bolivian War – Battle of Ingavi: The three competing Bolivian governments unite under Ballivián to defeat Gamarra.

== Deaths ==
- 18 November – Agustín Gamarra, President of Peru (b. 1785)

== Bibliography ==
- "Decreto Supremo de 27 August 1841". Gaceta Oficial del Estado Plurinacional de Bolivia (in Spanish). 27 September 1841.
- Mesa Gisbert, Carlos D. (2003). Presidentes de Bolivia: entre urnas y fusiles | El poder ejecutivo: los ministros de estado (in Spanish) (Third ed.). La Paz: Editorial Gisbert.
