= 1937 in Bolivia =

- Decades: 1910s; 1920s; 1930s; 1940s; 1950s
- See also: Other events of 1937; History of Bolivia • Years

Events in the year 1937 in Bolivia.

== Incumbents ==
- President: David Toro (until July 13), Germán Busch (starting July 13)

== Events ==
- August – founding of Bolivian Socialist Falange in Santiago, Chile by Bolivian exiles
- November 23 - founding of Workers' Party (Bolivia)
