= 1825 in Bolivia =

- Decades: 1800s; 1810s; 1820s; 1830s; 1840s
- See also: Other events of 1825; History of Bolivia • Years

Events in the year 1825 in Bolivia. This year is celebrated in Bolivia as the official beginning of the nation, with the Declaration of Independence issued on 6 August.

== Incumbents ==
- Head of State: (Note: The title of "President of the Republic" was not formally established until 19 June 1826. Bolívar and Sucre are generally regarded as the first and second presidents of Bolivia, respectively.)
  - Simón Bolívar (12 August–29 December)
  - Antonio José de Sucre (starting 29 December)

== Ongoing events ==
- Bolivian War of Independence (1809–1825)
- Invasion of Chiquitos (1825)

== Events ==
=== March ===
- 12 August: Simón Bolívar becomes the 1st President of Bolivia.
  Invasion of Chiquitos: The Empire of Brazil attempts to annex Chiquitos, now part of the Santa Cruz Department

=== April ===
- 1 April – War of Independence – Battle of Tumusla: Carlos Medinaceli Lizarazu defeats Pedro Antonio Olañeta in the last confrontation of the Bolivian War of Independence.

=== May ===
- 30 May – Invasion of Chiquitos: Brazil evacuates Chiquitos.

=== August ===
- 6 August – War of Independence: The Bolivian Declaration of Independence, in which Bolivia officially declares independence from the Spanish Empire, is approved by the General Assembly of Deputies of the Province of Upper Peru.
- 12 August – Simón Bolívar enters Bolivian territory. From that day, by virtue of the decree that proclaimed independence, he became the 1st President of Bolivia.
- 17 August
  - A green-red-green tricolor is adopted by the General Assembly as the flag of Bolivia.
  - A design is adopted by the General Assembly as the coat of arms of Bolivia.

=== December ===
- 29 December – Bolívar renounces his position and delegates command to Antonio José de Sucre.

== Deaths ==
- 2 April – Pedro Antonio Olañeta, Spanish Royalist general (b. 1774)

== Bibliography ==
- "Decreto Supremo de 17 July 1825". Gaceta Oficial del Estado Plurinacional de Bolivia (in Spanish). 17 August 1825a.
- "Decreto Supremo de 17 July 1825". Gaceta Oficial del Estado Plurinacional de Bolivia (in Spanish). 17 August 1825b.
- "Decreto Supremo de 29 November 1825". Gaceta Oficial del Estado Plurinacional de Bolivia (in Spanish). 29 December 1825c.
- "Ley de 19 May 1826". Gaceta Oficial del Estado Plurinacional de Bolivia (in Spanish). 19 June 1826.
- Mesa Gisbert, Carlos D. (2003). Presidentes de Bolivia: entre urnas y fusiles | El poder ejecutivo: los ministros de estado (in Spanish) (Third ed.). La Paz: Editorial Gisbert.
