= 1839 in Bolivia =

- Decades: 1810s; 1820s; 1830s; 1840s; 1850s
- See also: Other events of 1839; History of Bolivia • Years

Events in the year 1839 in Bolivia.

== Incumbents ==
- President: Andrés de Santa Cruz until February 20, José Miguel de Velasco Franco
- Supreme Protector of the Peru-Bolivian Confederation: Andrés de Santa Cruz until February 20

== Events ==
- January 6 - War of the Confederation: Battle of Buin
- January 12 - War of the Confederation: Battle of Casma
- January 20 - War of the Confederation: Battle of Yungay
- August 25 - dissolution of the Peru-Bolivian Confederation
