= 1976 in Bolivia =

- Decades: 1950s; 1960s; 1970s; 1980s; 1990s
- See also: Other events of 1976; History of Bolivia • Years

Events in the year 1976 in Bolivia.

== Incumbents ==
- President: Hugo Banzer

== Events ==
- 1976 Bolivian census
- July 17-August 1 - Bolivia participates in the 1976 Summer Olympics in Montreal, Quebec, Canada
- dissolution of Mariscal Santa Cruz

== Deaths ==
- June 2 - Juan José Torres, former President, in Argentina

== See also ==
- Bolivia at the 1976 Summer Olympics
