= 1903 in Bolivia =

- Decades: 1880s; 1890s; 1900s; 1910s; 1920s
- See also: Other events of 1903; History of Bolivia • Years

Events in the year 1903 in Bolivia.

== Incumbents ==
- President: José Manuel Pando (PL)
- First Vice President:
  - Lucio Pérez Velasco (PL) (until 23 January)
  - Vacant (starting 23 January)
- Second Vice President: Aníbal Capriles Cabrera (PL)

== Events ==
- 11 November - Treaty of Petrópolis with Brazil

== Births ==
- 6 February – Augusto Céspedes, journalist and diplomat (d. 1997)
- 23 March – Germán Busch, 36th president of Bolivia (d. 1939)
- 26 December – Carlos Montenegro, lawyer, politician, and writer (d. 1953)
