= 1840 in Bolivia =

- Decades: 1820s; 1830s; 1840s; 1850s; 1860s
- See also: Other events of 1840; History of Bolivia • Years

Events in the year 1840 in Bolivia.

== Incumbents ==
- President: José Miguel de Velasco Franco

== Births ==
- January 14 - Hilarión Daza, President 1876-1879
