= 1879 in Bolivia =

- Decades: 1850s; 1860s; 1870s; 1880s; 1890s
- See also: Other events of 1879; History of Bolivia • Years

Events from the year 1879 in Bolivia.

== Incumbents ==
- President: Hilarión Daza

== Events ==
- February 14 - The War of the Pacific begins when 500 Chilean soldiers arrive by ship and occupied the port city of Antofagasta without a fight, in response to the National Congress of Bolivia's attempt to seize and auction the assets of the Antofagasta Nitrate & Railway Company.
- March 23 - Battle of Topáter
- November 2 - Battle of Pisagua
- November 19 - Battle of San Francisco

== Births ==
- July 15 - Alcides Arguedas, historian (died 1946)

== Deaths ==
- March 23 - Eduardo Abaroa
