= 1967 in Bolivia =

- Decades: 1940s; 1950s; 1960s; 1970s; 1980s
- See also: Other events of 1967; History of Bolivia • Years

Events in the year 1967 in Bolivia.

== Incumbents ==
- President: René Barrientos
- Vice President: Luis Adolfo Siles Salinas

== Events ==
- August 31 - 9 members of Che Guevara's guerrillas are killed in government ambush
- October - Ñancahuazú Guerrilla defeated by Government of Bolivia with CIA assistance. Che Guevara captured and executed

== Deaths ==
- August 31 - Tamara Bunke, Argentine-born East German revolutionary, killed in ambush by Bolivian Army
- October 9
  - Che Guevara, Argentine-born Marxist revolutionary involved in Cuban Revolution and Simba Rebellion in Republic of the Congo (Léopoldville) (now Democratic Republic of the Congo)
  - Simeon Cuba Sarabia, Bolivian trade unionist and revolutionary, associate of Che Guevara
