= 1940 in Bolivia =

- Decades: 1920s; 1930s; 1940s; 1950s; 1960s
- See also: Other events of 1940; History of Bolivia • Years

Events in the year 1940 in Bolivia.

== Incumbents ==
- President: Carlos Quintanilla (Interim president) (until 15 April), Enrique Peñaranda (starting 15 April)

== Events ==
- 10 March – General elections are held. Enrique Peñaranda (I-CONC) wins by 85.99%
- 15 April – Enrique Peñaranda is sworn in as the 38th President of Bolivia.
- 26 July – Revolutionary Left Party (PIR) is founded in Oruro.
