= 1964 in Bolivia =

- Decades: 1940s; 1950s; 1960s; 1970s; 1980s
- See also: Other events of 1964; History of Bolivia • Years

The following is a list of events in the year 1964 in Bolivia.

== Incumbents ==
- President:
  - Víctor Paz Estenssoro (until 4 November)
- President of the Military Government Junta:
  - Alfredo Ovando Candía (5 November)
  - René Barrientos (starting 5 November)
- Vice President:
  - Juan Lechín (until 6 August)
  - René Barrientos (6 August – 4 November)
  - Vacant (starting 4 November)

== Ongoing events ==
- Bolivian National Revolution (1952–1964)

== Events ==
- 31 May – General elections are held. President Paz Estenssoro is reelected two a second consecutive and third overall term.
- 6 August – Paz Estenssoro and Barrientos are sworn in as president and vice president, respectively.
- 4 November – President Paz Estenssoro is ousted in a coup d'état led by Vice President Barrientos and General Ovando Candía.
- 5 November – Both Barrientos and Ovando Candía are sworn in as co-chairmen of junta, but the latter is forced to resign an hour later.

== Births ==
- 12 December – Elizabeth Salguero, diplomat, journalist, politician, and women's rights activist.

== Deaths ==
- 8 June – Carlos Quintanilla, 76, 37th president of Bolivia (b. 1888)
