= 1935 in Bolivia =

- Decades: 1910s; 1920s; 1930s; 1940s; 1950s
- See also: Other events of 1935; History of Bolivia • Years

Events in the year 1935 in Bolivia.

== Incumbents ==
- President: José Luis Tejada Sorzano

== Events ==
- January 11 - Paraguayan Army encircle and force the retreat of two Bolivian Army regiments
- February 7 - 5,000 Paraguayans attacked the heavily fortified Bolivian lines near Villa Montes, with the aim of capturing the oilfields at Nancarainza, but were beaten back by the Bolivian First Cavalry Division.
- March 6 - Paraguayan general Jose Felix Estigarribia again focused all his efforts on the Bolivian oilfields, this time at Camiri, 130 km north of Villa Montes. The commander of the Paraguayan 3rd Corps, Gen. Franco, found a gap between the Bolivian 1st and 18th Infantry regiments and ordered his troops to attack through it, but they became stuck in a salient with no hope of further progress. The Bolivian Sixth Cavalry forced the hasty retreat of Franco's troops in order to avoid being cut off
- April 15 - small scale offensive lets Paraguayans punch through the Bolivian lines on the Parapetí River, taking over the city of Charagua. The Bolivian command launched a counter-offensive that forced the Paraguayans back.
- May 27 - founding of Club Aurora
- June 4 - a Bolivian division was defeated, and parts of it forced to surrender, at Ingavi, in the northern front, after a last attempt at reaching the Paraguay River
- June 12 - ceasefire with Paraguay ending the Chaco War

== Deaths ==
- July 17 - Daniel Salamanca Urey, former President
