= 1829 in Bolivia =

- Decades: 1800s; 1810s; 1820s; 1830s; 1840s
- See also: Other events of 1829; History of Bolivia • Years

Events in the year 1829 in Bolivia.

== Incumbents ==
- President:
  - Pedro Blanco Soto (provisional: until 1 January)
  - José Miguel de Velasco (acting: 1 January – 24 May)
  - Andrés de Santa Cruz (starting 24 May)
- Vice President:
  - José Ramón de Loayza (provisional: until 1 January)
  - Vacant (1 January – 24 May)
    - José Miguel de Velasco (designate: 1 January – 24 May)
  - José Miguel de Velasco (starting 24 May)

== Events ==
=== January ===
- 1 January – President Pedro Blanco Soto is assassinated in the La Recoletta convent; at six days in office, he becomes the president with the shortest term served. He is succeeded by José Miguel de Velasco, who serves as president pending the arrival of Andrés de Santa Cruz.

=== May ===
- 24 May – Andrés de Santa Cruz takes office as the 6th president of Bolivia. Velasco becomes the 2nd vice president.

== Deaths ==
- 1 January – Pedro Blanco Soto, 5th president of Bolivia (b. 1795)

== Bibliography ==
- Mesa Gisbert, Carlos D. (2003). Presidentes de Bolivia: entre urnas y fusiles | El poder ejecutivo: los ministros de estado (in Spanish) (Third ed.). La Paz: Editorial Gisbert.
