= 1932 in Bolivia =

- Decades: 1910s; 1920s; 1930s; 1940s; 1950s
- See also: Other events of 1932; History of Bolivia • Years

The following lists events that happened during 1932 in the Republic of Bolivia.

== Incumbents ==
- President: Daniel Salamanca Urey
- Vice President: José Luis Tejada Sorzano

== Events ==
- September 7–29 - Battle of Boquerón

== See also ==
- Chaco War
