= 1877 in Bolivia =

- Decades: 1850s; 1860s; 1870s; 1880s; 1890s
- See also: Other events of 1877; History of Bolivia • Years

Events from the year 1877 in Bolivia.

== Incumbents ==
- President: Hilarión Daza

== Events ==
- May 9 - 1877 Iquique earthquake (magnitude 8.5)
