= 1907 in Bolivia =

- Decades: 1880s; 1890s; 1900s; 1910s; 1920s
- See also: Other events of 1907; History of Bolivia • Years

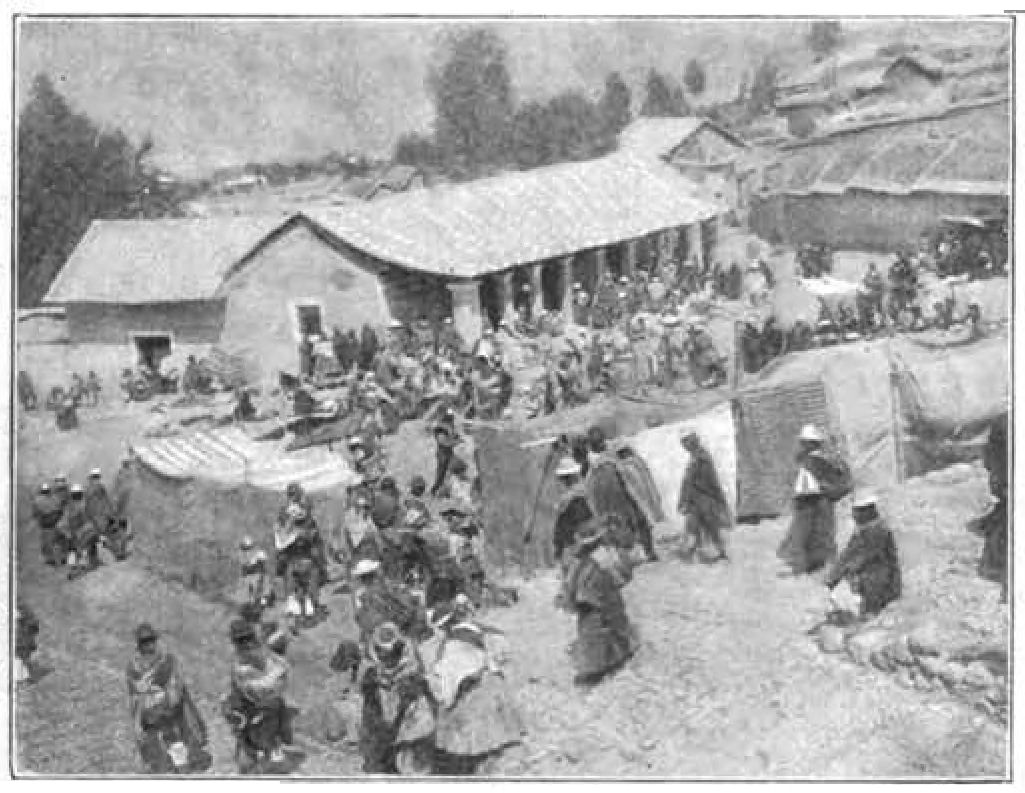
Indigenous Bolivians in 1907

Events in the year 1907 in Bolivia.

== Incumbents ==
- President: Ismael Montes

== Deaths ==
- March 19 - Mariano Baptista, president of Bolivia (b. 1832)
