= 1880 in Bolivia =

- Decades: 1860s; 1870s; 1880s; 1890s; 1900s
- See also: Other events of 1880; History of Bolivia • Years

Events from the year 1880 in Bolivia.

== Incumbents ==
- President: Narciso Campero

== Events ==
- March 22 - Battle of Los Ángeles
- May 26 - Battle of Tacna
