= 1971 in Bolivia =

- Decades: 1950s; 1960s; 1970s; 1980s; 1990s
- See also: Other events of 1971; History of Bolivia • Years

Events in the year 1971 in Bolivia.

== Incumbents ==
- President: Juan José Torres (until August 21), Hugo Banzer (starting August 22)

== Events ==
- August 21 - coup d'etat removes President Torres from office and Junta of Commanders of the Armed Forces 1971 (Bolivia) rules the country

== Births ==
- July 16 - Óscar Sánchez
