= 2020 in Bolivia =

- Decades: 2000s; 2010s; 2020s
- See also: Other events of 2020; History of Bolivia • Years

Events in the year 2020 in Bolivia.

== Incumbents ==
- President: Jeanine Áñez (Interim president) (until 8 November), Luis Arce (from 8 November)
- Vice President: (Vacant, See 2019 Bolivian political crisis), David Choquehuanca (from 8 November)

== Events ==
- 10 March – Bolivia reports its first COVID-19 cases, of two individuals in the departments of Oruro and Santa Cruz.
- 12 March – All public school sessions are suspended in Bolivia until 31 March, as well as all commercial flights to and from Europe indefinitely. Large-scale public gatherings of more than 1,000 people are also prohibited by the government.
- 18 October – General elections are held. Luis Arce (MAS-IPSP) wins an outright majority of 55.1%, eliminating the necessity of a runoff vote.
- 8 November – Luis Arce is inaugurated as the 67th President of Bolivia.

== Deaths ==
- 26 January – Alfredo Da Silva, 89, Bolivian-American artist (road accident)
- 2 September – Abdúl Aramayo, 86, international footballer
