= 2018 in Bolivia =

- Decades: 1990s; 2000s; 2010s; 2020s
- See also: Other events of 2018; History of Bolivia • Years

== Incumbents ==
- President: Evo Morales

== Events ==
- 9–25 February: 2 athletes from Bolivia compete at the 2018 Winter Olympics
- 13 February: A terrorist attack occurs in the city of Oruro.
- 6–18 October: Bolivia competes at the 2018 Summer Youth Olympics

== Deaths ==
- 19 February: Teresa Gisbert, 91, architect and art historian.
- 19 March: Julio Garrett Ayllón, 92, politician, lawyer and ambassador, Foreign Minister (1979–1980) and Vice President (1985–1989).
- 1 April: Julia Vargas-Weise, 76, Bolivian photographer, screenwriter, and film director (Sealed Cargo)
- 29 April: Luis García Meza, 88, Bolivian general and politician, President (1980–1981)
