= 1835 in Bolivia =

- Decades: 1810s; 1820s; 1830s; 1840s; 1850s
- See also: Other events of 1835; History of Bolivia • Years

Events in the year 1835 in Bolivia.

== Incumbents ==
- President: Andrés de Santa Cruz
- Vice President:
  - José Miguel de Velasco (until 23 July)
  - Mariano Enrique Calvo (starting 23 July)

== Ongoing events ==
- Salaverry-Santa Cruz War (1835–1836)

== Events ==
=== June ===
- 15 June – Salaverry-Santa Cruz War: President Santa Cruz and Anselmo Quiroz, representing Peruvian President Luis José de Orbegoso, sign a treaty in La Paz authorizing Bolivia to intervene in Peru.

=== July ===
- 23 July – Mariano Enrique Calvo is appointed as the 3rd vice president of Bolivia, succeeding José Miguel de Velasco.

=== August ===
- 13 August – Salaverry-Santa Cruz War – Battle of Yanacocha: A united Peru-Bolivian army commanded by Andrés de Santa Cruz defeats Agustín Gamarra at Yanacocha.
- 16 August – Santa Cruz is elected Constitutional President of the Republic by the parish electoral boards.

== Bibliography ==
- "Ley de 23 June 1835". Gaceta Oficial del Estado Plurinacional de Bolivia (in Spanish). 23 July 1835.
- Mesa Gisbert, Carlos D. (2003). Presidentes de Bolivia: entre urnas y fusiles | El poder ejecutivo: los ministros de estado (in Spanish) (Third ed.). La Paz: Editorial Gisbert.
