= 2017 in Bolivia =

- Decades: 1990s; 2000s; 2010s; 2020s
- See also: Other events of 2017; History of Bolivia • Years

Events in the year 2017 in Bolivia.

== Incumbents ==
- President: Evo Morales
- Vice President: Álvaro García Linera

== Events ==
- 4 November – Katherine Añazgo of Bolivia finishes as 4th runner-up in the Reina Hispanoamericana 2017 pageant.

=== Sport ===
- Bolivia at the 2017 World Championships in Athletics
- Continuing from 2016 – the 2016–17 Liga de Fútbol Profesional Boliviano season

== Deaths ==
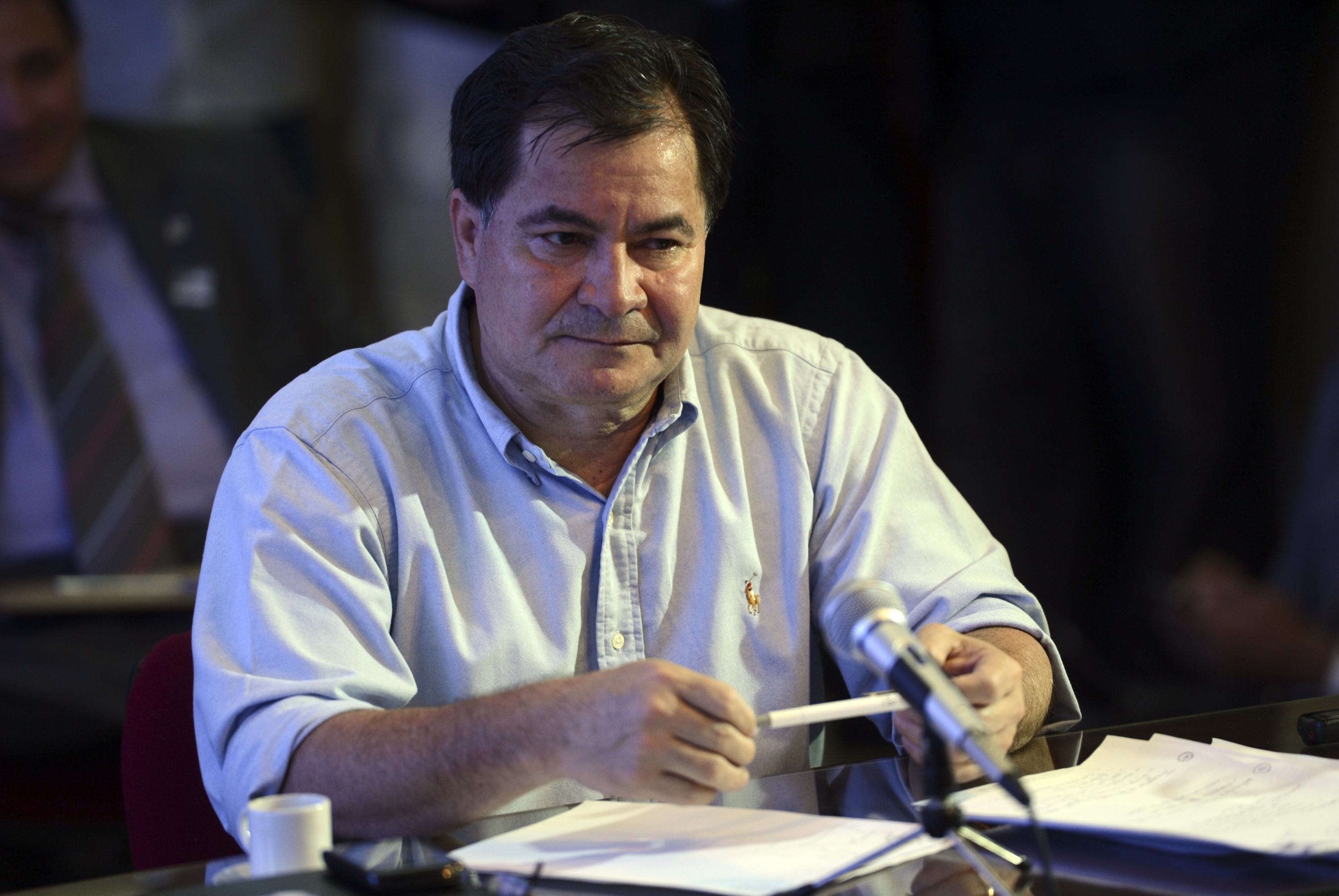
Roger Pinto Molina

- 23 February – Óscar Salas Moya, politician and trade unionist (b. 1936).
- 27 July – Ovidio Messa, footballer (b. 1952).
- 16 August – Roger Pinto Molina, politician (b. 1960).
- 17 November – Óscar Zamora Medinaceli, politician (b. 1934).
