= Mario Baudoin =

Bolivian biologist and conservationist (1942–2019)

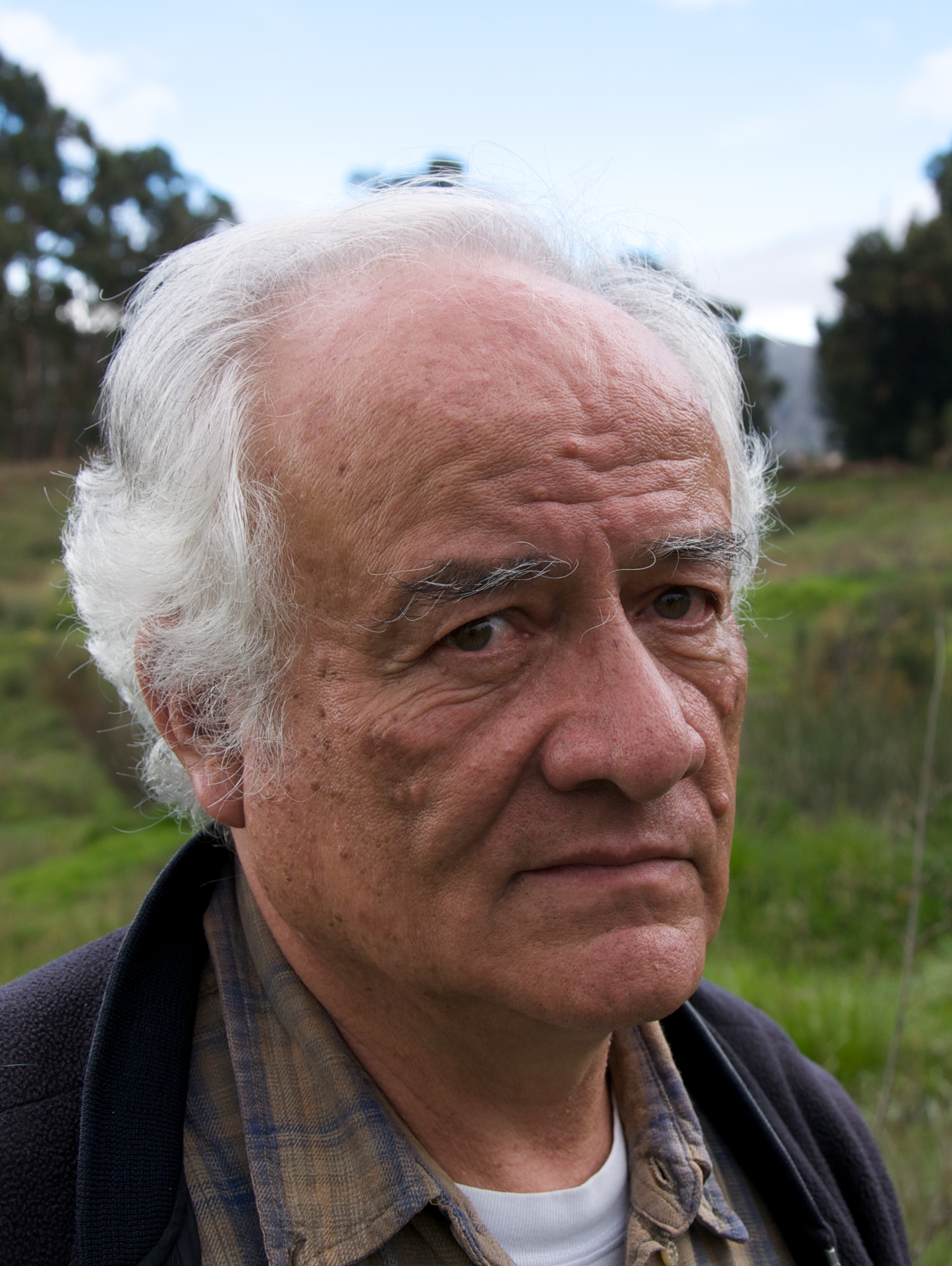
Baudoin in 2009

Mario Jorge Baudoin Weeks (September 4, 1942 – May 18, 2019) was a Bolivian biologist and conservationist known for his research in Bolivia and Costa Rica. He was the first director of Bolivia's national park system, and served as director of several academic and government institutes, including the Museo Nacional de Historia Natural de Bolivia, the Institute of Ecology at Higher University of San Andrés, Dirección Nacional Conservación de Biodiversidad (DNCB) and the La Selva Biological Station in Costa Rica. In the early 1990s he was involved in the creation of the Servicio Nacional de Áreas Protegidas (SERNAP), which led to the 1995 establishment of Madidi National Park. He received the 2008 Distinguished Services Award from the Society for Conservation Biology.

Born in Sucre, Baudoin received his education in the United States, earning a B.Sc. at the City College of New York in 1967 followed by a master's (1969) and Ph.D. (1976) from the University of Michigan. He joined the faculty of the Higher University of San Andrés in 1985. From 1991 to 1995 he was National Director of Biodiversity Conservation, where he secured several million dollars from the World Bank to support Bolivia's national park system. From 1998 to 2002 he served as General Director of Biodiversity under the Vice Ministry of Environment, Natural Resources and Forestry Development, serving several times as Acting Deputy Minister. Baudoin died in La Paz on May 18, 2019, at the age of 76. He is commemorated in the scientific name of the bromeliad species Greigia marioi.
