= José Miguel García Lanza =

Hero of the Bolivian wars of independence

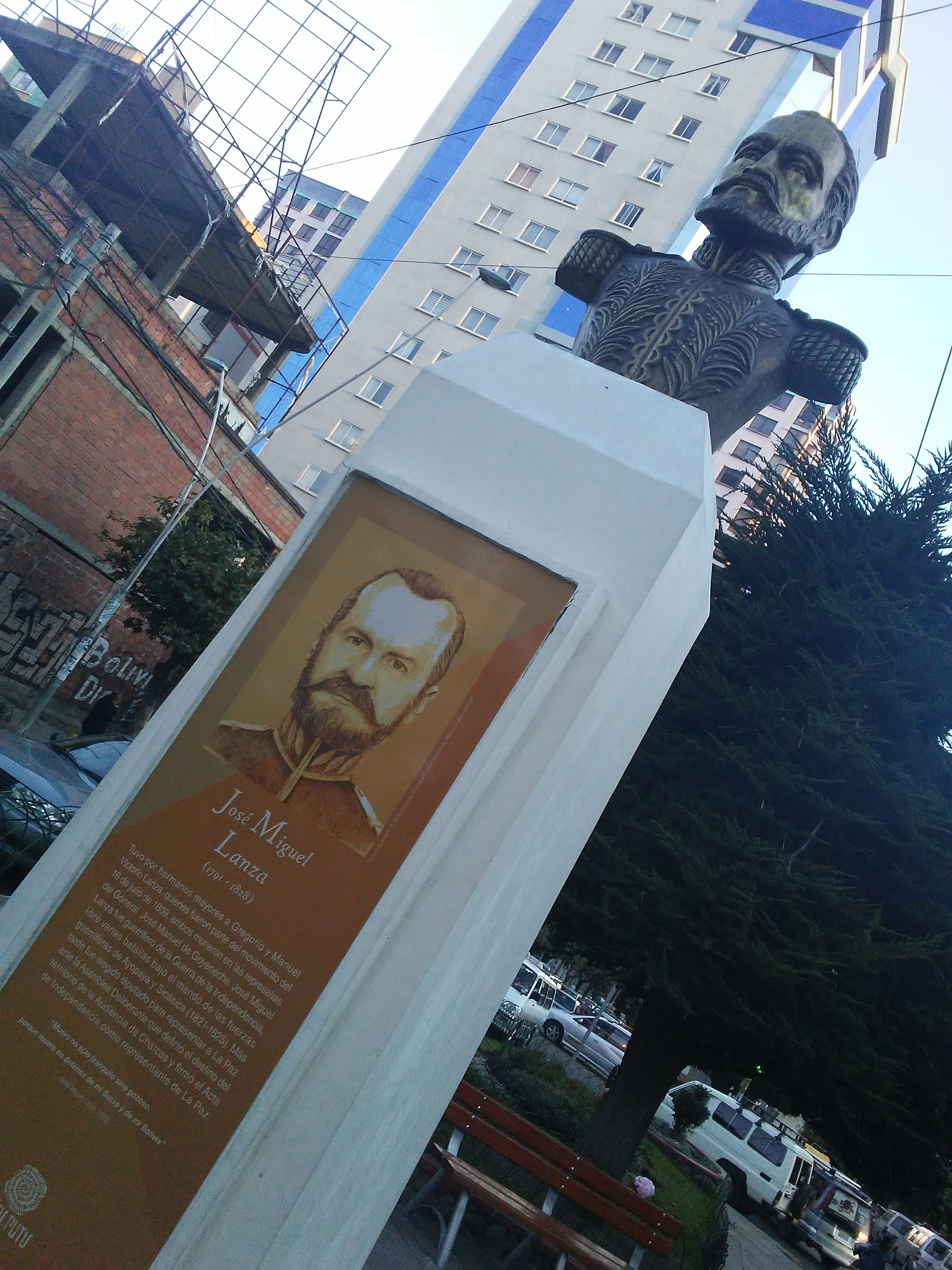
Bust of José Miguel García Lanza.

José Miguel García Lanza (17??–1828; also, José Miguel Lanza) was a hero of the Bolivian wars of independence. Historian William Lofstron describes him as a "guerrilla chieftain" who, after many years of warfare against Spanish forces, finally "occupied his native La Paz in late January 1825," before the arrival of the liberating general Marshall Sucre.

In power, Lanza was less successful. Sucre "complain[ed] bitterly" to his fellow liberator Simón Bolívar that "Lanza's administration would result in the utter ruin of departmental finances" because of "Lanza's apparent inability to control the greed and corruption that surrounded him."

Elected to the national Assembly in 1825, Lanza left La Paz for Potosí. He died in 1828, whilst attempting to suppress a mutiny against president Antonio José Sucre by Colombian soldiers of the Presidential Guard.
