= History of Bolivian nationality =

Historically, a major issue for the Bolivian nationality movement has been citizenship for indigenous peoples. Over time, the rights for the indigenous peoples in Bolivia have increased, including giving political voice and property rights. Presently, the indigenous peoples are denied full citizenship.

== Indigenous movements ==
An integral facet of the nationality movement in Bolivia concerns itself with the question of indigenous peoples. In part, the desire for independence from Spain stemmed from the growing mass of Indians and other indigenous groups within Bolivia who were in the process of reacquiring an identity that was not linked to Europe. While their subjugation and ostracization from the political arena is well catalogued, the fact remains that for a significant portion of Bolivia's modern history natives were excluded from citizenship rights as well. The Spanish colony had shaped sociocultural diversity in its inception by establishing a dual-republic model: that of the Spaniards, which was dominant, and that of the Indians, "which paid the first its tribute and its labor."

Furthermore, the establishment of "regimes of social order" created categories of belonging and "otherness" that continue into the modern era. According to Deborah Yashar, author of "Contesting Citizenship in Latin America: The Rise of Indigenous Movements and the Postliberal Challenge", although indigenous peoples constitute a majority of the population in Bolivia, politicians are prone to use them as tools in the political process, essentially furthering their subjugated status. Conversely, however, the inclusion of native imagery is often utilized to create a sense of national identity, even though the indigenous peoples are excluded from participating in it. For example, urban elites tend to identify with indigenous imagery in order to distinguish themselves as Bolivian, although this serves as a contradiction, as they will vigorously attempt to draw distinctions between themselves and 'real' indigenous peoples. In fact, it is "through the interplay of racial discrimination and gender hierarchy that the national ideal is constructed and … that racialized class inequality is reproduced and reinforced."

However, this course is shifting, as regional movements in both Andean and Amazonian Bolivia emerge to defend the local autonomy of separate native groups. An example of the need to protect the local autonomy is witnessed in the rise of state intervention in the Amazon, where previously this autonomy had fared well without state presence. The result of these movements was the forging and introduction of ethnic politics into the political debate. While these did not reshape the entire political process, issues that began to dominate the national discourse included territorial autonomy, legal pluralism, and land reform, among other indigenous concerns.

This in turn led to demanding equal positions in the nascent democracy created in the late twentieth century. However, there were three developments that impeded the rise of true indigenous autonomy in the political sphere. First of all, the success of "indigenous reforms" depended largely on the political will of the sitting Bolivian president. Second, political party competition was a significant obstacle, in that the various political parties already entrenched in the system would attempt to ensnare the indigenous movements, which had the effect of weakening the individual interest groups. By participating in electoral politics, the indigenous movement could be torn asunder, where factions and disagreements could be fomented over which party to support.

== Early identification among indigenous groups ==
For most of the nineteenth century, when the question of citizenship began to rise to the fore, there existed in Bolivia two distinct entities, namely those with power and the indigenous groups. The desire of the native groups to be more than simply hard laborers began to cause a rift in Bolivian society; as early as 1826, a British vice-consular secretary noted that there were strong disintegrative forces at work within the republic, related to physical, cultural and regional diversity. There were many reasons for the discontent among the native Bolivians, as well as for the fear among the ruling elite. One example is that the major urban centers were situated in the midst of the Aymara and Quechua communities, which were two of the more influential indigenous groups.

However, of the more incendiary problems, the territorial issue was the more prominent, as it was an area of contention for many Bolivians. In the early nineteenth century, the indigenous population of Bolivia was divided between a servile tenantry who lived on landed estates and those communal members who inhabited independent communities, called ayllus. According to the first national census in 1846, over half the population lived on these communal landholdings; the significance in this is that peasant communities still held approximately half the land as well as half the population, whereas the servile tenantry was steadily declining. Seeing as how the indigenous population paid significant tributary taxes on all revenues, it became advantageous for the Bolivian republic to continue the system of official tributary and territorial identification as a basis of "Indianness," rather than abolish the arrangement. The tributary system had been instituted as a result of economic collapse, Bolivia being an especially weakened and economically depressed country as the independence era drew to a close. Furthermore, there existed a serious social stratification among indigenous communities, reinforced by the early republic: at the top were situated those living in ayllus, followed by the servile tenantry, with peasant freeholders situated on the bottom.

While all enjoyed a relatively institutionalized relationship with regards to the law and the governing bureaucracy, the main separation lay in the fact that the first two social castes held a vested interest in the tributary system, while the landless peasant did not. This led to a rapid decline in tributary populations, as these individuals would evade tax collectors and the official tax rolls. Therefore, to be perceived as Indian, or as truly indigenous, was not simply a legal and administrative tool, but rather a facet of everyday practices. In fact, indigenous tribes began to advocate for a "hybrid tributary-citizenship status," which was firmly entrenched with land holdings; in other words, to hold land meant obtaining some variant of official citizenship.

== Attempting land reform ==
Eventually, however, this limited ideal for inclusive citizenship coupled with various failed attempts at land reform was insufficient to satisfy the native groups who wished to partake more fully in a growing economy. The government attempted at various moments during the 1860s to introduce Indian land reforms, which were met with stiff opposition. The 1863 decree by President Jose Maria de Acha dealt with revisiting idealized forms of Indian land tenure. Acha advocated the subdivision of communal plots leading to a participation in a free market economy, where natives would buy and sell households at will, a practice that many believed would increase agricultural production and lead many Indians to becoming prosperous yeomen. However, the government also stipulated that the Indian must "civilize," by which it was understood that new households must conform to certain accepted norms, such that they be "comfortable, spacious and ventilated houses," or the construction of state approved educational facilities would need to be undertaken. The government faced stiff opposition from indigenous groups and the venture was dropped until the land reforms were forced upon the population by subsequent governments in 1866 and 1868. In adopting these land reforms, the government demonstrated its ignorance of Indian culture within its own borders: by hoping that the indigenous peoples would adapt easily and sell off vast tracts of land to the highest bidder, thereby putting wastelands into production and easily increasing state revenues, they failed to consider traditional practices of land rotation. More important to the Indians claims to citizenship, however, was the land reformers' plan to strengthen the image of the Indian as peasant, whereby any claims to citizenship would be dictated and controlled by the state: socializing them to perform manual labor, to stay in the countryside, in all an attempt to civilize the Indians on the government's terms.

This was not accepted quietly. The most active group in pursuing greater participation in acquiring citizenship rights was the Aymara, who would challenge the tributary system by day via official legal means, whereas at night they would embark upon guerrilla tactics to oppose the changes in land tenure being enforced by the government.

== 1874 Ley de Ex-vinculacion ==
This law saw the culmination of a decade of struggle between the various native groups and the government. It set the basic terms for Indian landholding that would continue up to the mid-twentieth century. While the law conceded the right of individual landownership to Indians, it also abolished the community as a juridical entity. Rather, this radical law dismantled the tributary system that had existed for decades, replaced instead by a universal property tax. Unfortunately, Indians lost the modicum of power that they had held as ethnic mediators; henceforth, they would be juridical subjects of civil law, "directly subject to the authority of white and mestizo agents and to the siege of the land market."

== Twentieth century ==
As South American states strengthened up to the mid-twentieth century, so too did the ideals attached to the notion of citizenship and belonging. Throughout, the hardness or flexibility of "ethnic hierarchies continued to be influenced through specific local power, socioeconomic, and demographic structures." In regions where a dominant white had exercised excessive authority for many decades over a broad majority of subordinated ethnic groups, as in the case of Bolivia, ethnic hierarchies tended to remain more closed. However, the mid-twentieth century saw the emergence of indigenous intellectuals who desired to design, in the words of Jacobsen and de Losada, a "racial order for the nation capable of overcoming what they saw as the degenerate, corrupt, and chaotic Bolivian republic of the nineteenth century."

The change in attitudes and the desire to obtain an improved version of citizenship for indigenous groups began in the early stages of the twentieth century. At this point in time, Bolivian intellectuals began to distance themselves from racial theories that had long been imported from old Europe, and began to examine their own multicultural heritage. One of the proposed methods to accomplish this was to propose new reforms that would genuinely benefit the Indian races within Bolivia, in the hopes that the entire state could benefit. One theory that emerged was the cultural nationalism of Franz Tamayo. Although taking a superior stance, he advocated the introduction of "educator-civilizers," who would help uplift the indigenous peoples from their lack of citizenship rights; however, the Indian would have to earn his place within the nation-state through "productive labor, patriotic service, and civic virtues." In other words, Tamayo envisioned a social compact between the state and indigenous tribes, wherein citizenship was provided in exchange for the conversion of the Indian into something resembling the ruling classes.

However, although the clean-cut version of creating a common citizenship and nationality seemed easy to accomplish, the reality remained that nation building is a complex undertaking. This is especially true when the object of nationalization is located the margins or even outside the boundaries of national belonging, owing to cultural practices and issues of race, class and gender. By the end of the first decade of the twentieth century, it became obvious that the indigenous populations were not becoming consumed by the assimilationist attempt. The problem, as in the nineteenth century, was a question of Indian land ownership. Intensifying agrarian battles led to a growing amount of litigation and political campaigning by indigenous authorities, which had the effect of generating a type of official acknowledgement of their status and citizenship within Bolivia. In a sense, the native groups used the weapons of the state to fashion a sense of belonging that rendered official their claims to citizenship rights. This led in turn to the growing movement of local and ethnic authorities mounting their own political discourses from below the mainstream political ideologies, from which they began to contest the political discourses and practices currently in place. This emerging national network began to demand rights to land, to education, and to full citizenship. However, it would take several decades before any real headway could be made, but the groundwork had been laid.

=== Political movements post-1950s ===
For a brief moment, there seemed to be hope for the indigenous political movement. In 1953, a party known as the Movimiento Nacionalist Revolucionaria (MNR, Nationalist Revolutionary Movement) had led a national revolution coupled with an agrarian reform; this in turn was succeeded by over three decades of military rule, where a Peasant-Military treaty was signed. The Aymara population collaborated closely with these regimes, in large part by stifling subversive attitudes. Their reward for their loyalty was universal suffrage, as well as the ability to impose their own style of local government in extensive agricultural areas.

However, indigenous tribes still emerged in the 1980s with the desire to eradicate the exploitation and oppression of the Aymara and other indigenous peoples that had not been addressed by any government since the early twentieth century. By and large, the Aymara were elected by popular acclaim to lead indigenous groups to larger citizenship; the Aymara, for their part, renewed their support for the MNR. By the 1990s, the MNR saw resurgence in popularity, their candidate winning the presidential election in 1993. Upon his victory, he stated that "marginalization, inequality, and discrimination will be diminished in Bolivia, so as to yield to the building of a multicultural, multiethnic and plurinational country." The future for indigenous peoples seemed bright indeed. Unfortunately, although the native movement was allied with the winning party, their inherent political weakness prevented them from enjoying full advantage of its access to the government.

== Future ==
With enthusiasm and expectations concerning their acceptance into full citizenship running so high, there was bound to be disappointment. With the first consecutive elected governments for decades, the first governments in Bolivia were more occupied with facing the challenge of mounting debts and weak economies than rectify the citizenship status of indigenous peoples, even if these same peoples had lent the party enough clout to ascend to governance. In fact, for most of the nineties, each successive government faced a different national crisis that required full attention. For the most part, although the future is brighter than it was in the nineteenth century, as indigenous peoples now have political voice as well as property rights, native peoples in Bolivia continue to be frustrated and exempt from full citizenship status.
