= 1933 Bolivian legislative election =

Parliamentary elections were held in Bolivia in May 1933 to elect half the seats in the Chamber of Deputies and one-third of the Senate.

== Results ==
Party	Votes	%	Seats					
Party	Votes	%	Chamber			Senate		
Party	Votes	%	Elected	Total	+/–	Elected	Total	+/–
Genuine Republican Party				39	+11	0	1	–4
Liberal Party				22	–4	0	8	–2
Republican Party				7	–2	0	1	0
Independents				5	+3	5	5	+5
Vacant							1	–
Total			37	73	+5	5	16	0
Source: Political Handbook of the World
