= Beatriz Canedo Patiño =

- Born: 1950; La Paz, Bolivia
- Died: 13 March 2016 (aged 66); La Paz, Bolivia
- Occupation: Fashion designer
- Label: Royal Alpaca Inc.
- Website: http://www.beatrizcanedopatino.com/

Beatriz Canedo Patiño (1950–2016) was a Bolivian fashion designer described as the "Queen of Alpaca" due to her use of textiles from camelids such as the vicuña, alpaca, and llama. The New York Times described her in 2006 as "Bolivia's best known fashion designer."

== Biography ==
Canedo Patiño was born in La Paz, one of five children to David Canedo and Aida Patiño del Valle. She and her family moved to California and later Paris when she was 13 years old.

Canedo Patiño studied in Paris, and launched her design house, Royal Alpaca Inc., in New York in 1987. She actively promoted the use and development of the export of camelid fibres. Due to her success, and her traditional surname, Canedo Patiño was described as representing "Successful Bolivia."

Among her clients was the President of Bolivia, Evo Morales, for whom she created custom designs including the suit for his inauguration. While attempts had been made during Morales's campaign to get Canedo Patiño involved, she had declined the invitations despite expressing her "moral adherence" to him. However, after his success, a few days before the inauguration, Canedo presented Morales with a custom-designed alpaca outfit that helped establish the President's distinctive look of dark Mao collared suits with designs taken from indigenous Andean art. She also made outfits for Hillary Clinton's visit to Bolivia in her capacity as First Lady of the United States.

Canedo Patiño died on 13 March 2016.
