= Amauris Samartino Flores =

Cuban physician

Amauris Samartino Flores is a Cuban physician who escaped from his native country in 1999 in a makeshift raft. He was given asylum in Bolivia, but after becoming politically active in that country, protesting the governments of both Fidel Castro and Evo Morales, was deported. He now lives in Norway.

On January 9, 2007, Samartino, a Cuban refugee who had been a resident of Bolivia since 2000, was expelled from that country after having been held for seventeen days for criticizing the Bolivian and Cuban governments. According to a report by the Human Rights Foundation (HFR), "Samartino was subjected to numerous human rights violations, including wrongful imprisonment, arbitrary detainment, forced exile, due process abuse, and undue restriction of free speech." He arrived in Colombia on the night of January 8. Thor Halvorssen, president of HRF, said: "Amauris Samartino’s case is a scandal and it reveals that the government of Bolivia will stop at nothing to silence dissent."

== History ==
Samartino left Cuba in 1999 in a homemade raft along with eleven other dissidents. A U.S. Coast Guard patrol boat picked him up and took him to the Guantanamo military base. He remained there for some months until the International Organization for Migration arranged asylum for him in Bolivia. He arrived in Bolivia on October 24, 2000. According to a Catholic priest, Fernando Rojas Silva, Samartino and the other dissidents were “brought to Santa Cruz by the U.S. Embassy, given a few dollars for their survival and a paper certifying that the Bolivian government would provide the paperwork necessary to remain in the country. Months passed and nothing happened. They ran out of dollars and moved to the capital,” where they began “knocking on doors of official institutions and the Embassy.” Finally, in desperation, they held “a hunger strike...outside the U.S. Embassy,” whereupon “the representative of UNHCR requested the intervention of mediators.”

Eventually Samartino was certified as a political refugee in Bolivia, and later he became a permanent legal resident. It was in Santa Cruz that he met his wife, Normina Chávez, and, according to the British medical journal The Lancet, “worked as a supervisor in natural gas operations.”

Samartino became politically active “after Evo Morales, a socialist and a close ideological ally of both Venezuela's President Hugo Chavez and Cuba's President Fidel Castro, was elected Bolivia's president in 2005 and Cuban doctors began arriving. Samartino said he feared Bolivia was going to be turned into a second Cuba so he began speaking out in the media about the Communist island's human rights violations and helping Cuban medics who wanted to defect.”

The Lancet paraphrased Samartino as saying that “Cuba's overseas medical programme is more political than humanitarian,” and as noting that “Cuba has sent many more medical personnel to oil-rich Venezuela, ruled by a close ally, than to Haiti, the hemisphere's poorest nation, and which is wracked by an AIDS epidemic.”

In 2006, Samartino spoke out in the Bolivian media against violations of human rights by the Cuban regime and lamented Castro's influence on Morales. In July of that year, according to HRF, Samartino “announced that he had assisted thirty dissident Cuban doctors, who were visiting Bolivia in a cooperative exchange program, in defecting to Brazil and to the United States.”

=== Arrest ===
On December 23, 2006, Samartino, while walking with his wife on a street in Santa Cruz, was stopped by five armed men who, although dressed in civilian clothes, said that they were police, though they did not produce identification. They handcuffed Samartino, put him in a car, and drove him away without explanation. Samartino's wife and family friends then sought to find out where he was and why he had been arrested. It turned out that he had been placed in a cell at the La Paz headquarters of the Special Crime Fighting Forces, where he was told that he was about to be sent back to Cuba for having criticized both the Cuban and Bolivian governments. On December 26 of that year, the Partido Republicano de Cuba declared its solidarity with Samartino.

Samartino's arrest was ordered by Bolivian cabinet member Alicia Muñoz on the grounds that he had violated a 1996 immigration law prohibiting the involvement of foreigners in Bolivia's internal political affairs – a law that had been declared unconstitutional in 2001 on the grounds that it violated free-speech rights. On December 27, the Bolivian office of the Defender of the People maintained that there were no legal grounds on which Bolivia could return Samartino to Cuba. Samartino stated that deportation to Cuba would mean execution for him. His lawyer, Rodolfo Téllez, expressed the same concern.

During this time, Cuba's ambassador to Bolivia, Rafael Dausa, who wanted Samartino returned to Cuba, met with Bolivian officials; on December 27, Dauza called Samartino a criminal, accused him of fraud, and described him as “anti-Castro, an alcoholic, a fraudster, and thief.” A Bolivian senator accused Samartino of planning violent protests, while a spokesman for Evo Morales said Samartino had “denigrated” Castro.

On December 28, it was reported that Judge Rene Delgado had ordered Samartino's return to the place from which he had arrived in Bolivia – namely, the U.S. base at Guantánamo Bay.

On February 2, 2007, the Bolivian Constitutional Court ruled that the detention and expulsion of Samartino was arbitrary and illegal. HRF had filed an amicus curiae brief explaining delineating that Samartino's arrest and detention violated Bolivian law as well as four international treaties of which Bolivia was a signatory. Bolivian Vice President Álvaro García Linera refused, however, to obey the court's ruling.

After Samartino's case drew the attention of the Bolivian media, the Bolivian government apparently changed its plan, announcing that it would attempt to deport Samartino to some country other than Cuba. Although the Constitutional Court had clearly found the laws unconstitutional under which Bolivia was attempting to expel Samartino, Judge René Delgado said that those laws remained in effect.

=== Aftermath ===
On January 9, 2007, after being held illegally for 17 days, Samartino was expelled from Bolivia without due process of law. He was taken into custody by UN refugee officials, who flew him to Bogotá, Colombia. He was later granted asylum in Norway. “Although my home is Bolivia,” said Samartino, “I am overjoyed that Norway is willing to be a safe harbor for those with the temerity to express themselves freely. Bolivia is no longer a safe place for those who disagree, no matter how peacefully, with the government of Evo Morales.”

On November 24, 2009, Samartino sent an open letter to then U.S. Congressman Lincoln Diaz-Balart, asking him to help Cuban doctors in Bolivia who were being denied asylum and travel visas.

In January 2011, the website of the Norwegian state media organization, NRK, featured a major article about the Cuban medical system based largely on Samartino's testimony. Entitled “Behind the facade, there is only misery,” the article quoted Samartino as saying that Cuba's “low infant-mortality rate is a lie,” that patients in many Cuban hospitals have to supply their own food and bedsheets, and that it health personnel routinely falsify statistics.
