= History of Bolivia =

The history of Bolivia involves thousands of years of human habitation. Lake Titicaca had been an important center of culture and development for thousands of years. The Tiwanaku people reached an advanced level of civilization before being conquered by a rapidly expanding Inca Empire in the 15th and 16th centuries. The Inca themselves were shortly afterward conquered by the Spanish led by Francisco Pizarro in the early 16th century. The region that now makes up Bolivia fell under the Viceroyalty of Peru. It was specifically known as Upper Peru, and in 1776 was transferred to the newly established Viceroyalty of Rio de la Plata with its capital in Buenos Aires.

A notable but ill-fated indigenous revolt against the Spanish authorities occurred in the late 18th century being led by Túpac Amaru II. Upper Peru joined the Spanish American wars of independence in the early 19th century and the Bolivian Republic was established in 1825, being named after Simon Bolivar. In the course of the 19th century, Bolivia fell repeatedly into wars against its neighbors, culminating in a devastating loss in the War of the Pacific, which resulted in Bolivia losing its access to the sea, along with rich nitrate fields.

Bolivia faced a further losses in the Chaco War against Paraguay of the 1930s. The Bolivian National Revolution broke out in the 1950s and attempted a program of nationalization of resources and expansion of suffrage. The country fell into military rule and experienced a series of coups until a transition to democratic government in the 1980s which still struggled with a rapidly deteriorating economy. 21st century Bolivian politics would be dominated by Evo Morales until he resigned in the wake of the 2019 Bolivian political crisis.

== Pre-Columbian period ==
Tiwanaku at its largest territorial extent, 950 CE

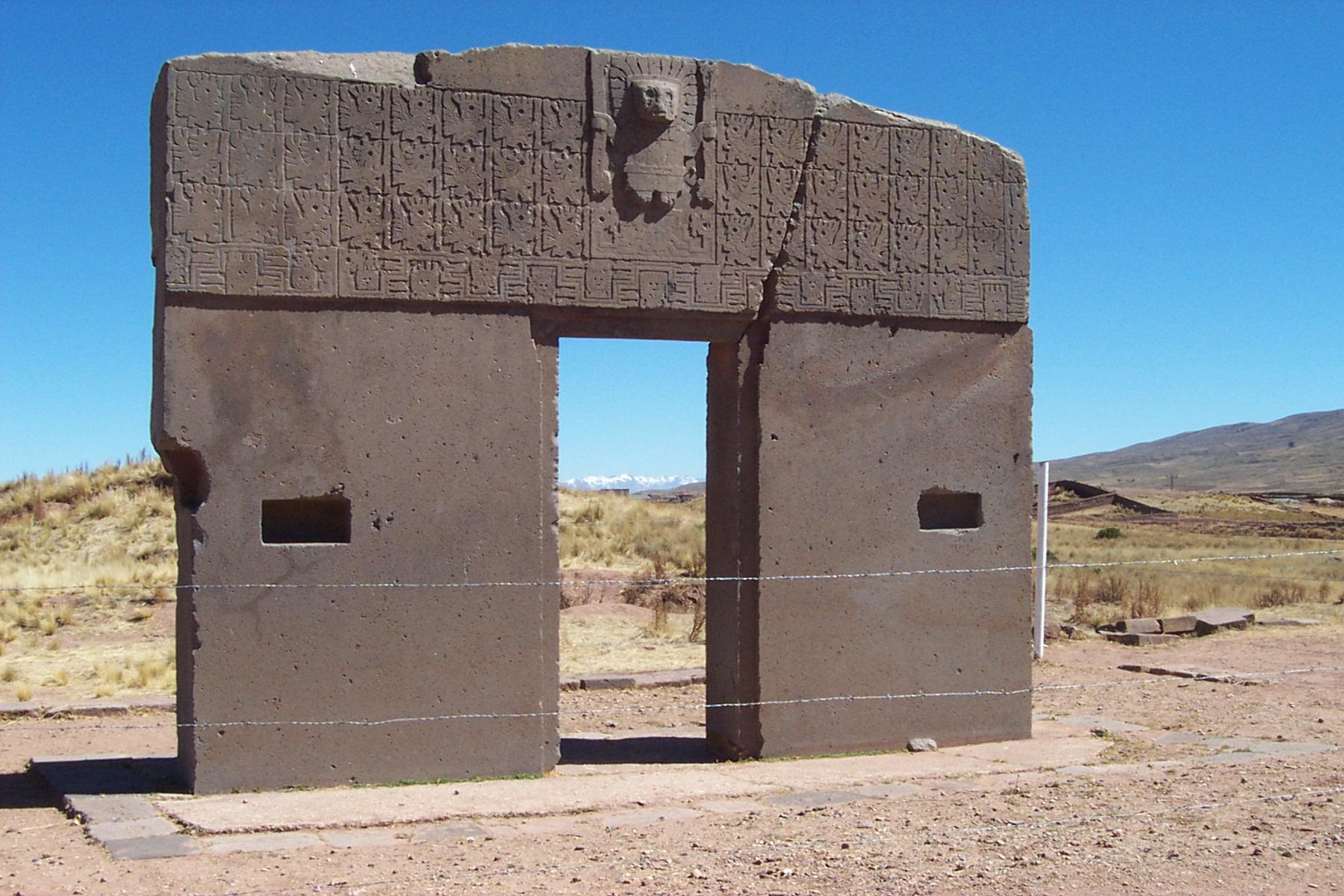
Gateway of the Sun at Tiwanaku

Cultures of indigenous peoples in Bolivia developed in the high altitude settings of altiplano with low oxygen levels, poor soils and extreme weather patterns. The better-suited lowlands were sparsely inhabited by hunter-gatherer societies while much of the pre-Columbian population was concentrated in altiplano valleys of Cochabamba and Chuquisaca. The potato was domesticated near lake Titicaca between 8000 and 5000 BC, quinoa some 3,000–4,000 years ago and production of copper began in 2000 BC. Llama, alpaca and vicuña were domesticated and used for transport, food and clothing.

Aymara people arrived in the region some 2000 years ago, eventually settling in Western Bolivia, Southern Peru and Northern Chile. Present-day Aymaras associate themselves with the advanced culture of Tiwanaku, which after 600 became an important regional power. According to early estimates, at its maximum extent, the city covered approximately 6.5 square kilometers and had between 15,000 and 30,000 inhabitants. However, satellite imaging was used recently to map the extent of "flooded-raised fields" (suka qullu) across the three primary valleys of Tiwanaku, arriving at population-carrying capacity estimates of anywhere between 285,000 and 1,482,000 people.

William H. Isbell states that "Tiahuanaco underwent a dramatic transformation between AD 600 and 700 that established new monumental standards for civic architecture and greatly increased the resident population." Tiwanaku gained its power through the trade it implemented between all of the cities within its empire. The empire continued to grow with no end in sight. Tiwanaku continued to absorb cultures rather than eradicate them. Archaeologists note a dramatic adoption of Tiwanaku ceramics into the cultures which became part of the Tiwanaku empire. Tiwanaku's power was further solidified through the trade it implemented among the cities within its empire.

Tiwanaku's elites gained their status through the surplus food they controlled, collected from outlying regions, and then redistributed to the general populace. Further, this elite's control of llama herds became a powerful control mechanism, as llamas were essential for carrying goods between the civic center and the periphery. These herds also came to symbolize class distinctions between the commoners and the elites. Through this control and manipulation of surplus resources, the elite's power continued to grow until about AD 950. After 950 a dramatic shift in climate occurred and there was a significant drop in precipitation for the Titicaca Basin. Tiwanaku disappeared around AD 1150 because food production collapses and could no longer sustain the large population. The land was not inhabited for many years after that. Between 1438 and 1527 the Inca empire embarked on a mass expansion, acquiring much of what is now western Bolivia under their 9th emperor, Pachacuti Inca Yupanqui, whose reign lasted from 1438 to 1471. Pachacuti Yupanqui was succeeded by his son, Topa Inca Yupanqui whose reign also increased the Incan territory and lasted from 1471 to 1493. During the 15th century, the Incas conquered the region of Lake Titicaca and western Bolivia became a part of the Inca territory as province of Qullasuyu.

== Spanish colonial period ==
=== Conquest by Spain ===
Inca expansion (1438–1533 CE)

Francisco Pizarro, Diego de Almagro, and Hernando de Luque led the Spanish discovery and conquest of the Inca empire. They first sailed south in 1524 along the Pacific coast from Panama to confirm the existence of a legendary land of gold called "Biru" (later altered to Peru). Because the rapidly expanding Inca Empire was internally weak, conquest was remarkably easy. After the Inca Emperor Huayna Capac died in 1527, his sons Huascar and Atahualpa fought over the succession. Although Atahualpa defeated his brother, he had not yet consolidated his power when the conquistadors arrived. Atahualpa did not attempt to defeat Pizarro when he arrived on the coast in 1532 because the Incan ruler was convinced that those who commanded the mountains also controlled the coast. Atahualpa's refusal to accept the permanent Spanish presence and to convert to Christianity led to the bloody Battle of Cajamarca on 16 November 1532. Pizarro in a masterful strike killed Atahualpa's 12-man honor guard and took the Inca captive at the so-called ransom room. One year later, the Inca capital of Cuzco fell and was refounded as a new Spanish settlement.

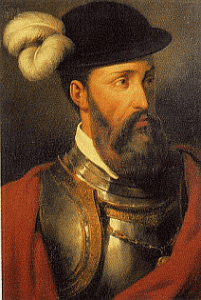
Francisco Pizarro

Despite Pizarro's quick victory, Inca rebellions soon began and continued periodically throughout the colonial period. In 1537 Manco Inca, whom the Spanish had established as a puppet emperor, rebelled against the new rulers and restored a "neo-Inca" state. This state continued to challenge Spanish authority even after the Spanish suppressed the revolt and beheaded Túpac Amaru in the public square of Cuzco in 1572. Later revolts in the Bolivian highlands were usually organized by the elders of the community and remained local in nature, except for the great rebellion of Túpac Amaru II.

During the first two decades of Spanish rule, the settlement of the Bolivian highlands – now known as Upper Peru (Alto Perú) or Real Audiencia of Charcas – was delayed by a civil war between the forces of Pizarro and Diego de Almagro. The two conquistadors had divided the Incan territory, with the north under the control of Pizarro and the south under that of Almagro. Fighting broke out in 1537 when Almagro seized Cuzco after suppressing the Manco Inca rebellion. Pizarro defeated and executed Almagro in 1538, but was himself assassinated three years later by former supporters of Almagro. Pizarro's brother Gonzalo assumed control of Upper Peru but soon became embroiled in a rebellion against the Spanish crown. Only with the execution of Gonzalo Pizarro in 1548 did the Spanish crown succeed in reasserting its authority; later that year colonial authorities established the city of La Paz, which soon became an important commercial center.

The conquest and colonial rule were traumatic experiences for the indigenous peoples in Bolivia. Easily susceptible to European diseases, the native population decreased rapidly. However, the resistance of indigenous people of the Bolivian lowlands managed to delay the conquest and settlement of their lands. The Spanish established Santa Cruz de la Sierra in 1561, but the Gran Chaco (the colonial name for the arid Chaco region) remained a wild frontier throughout colonial rule. In the Chaco, the Native Americans, mostly Chiriguano, carried out unrelenting attacks against colonial settlements and remained independent of direct Spanish control.

=== Spanish administration ===
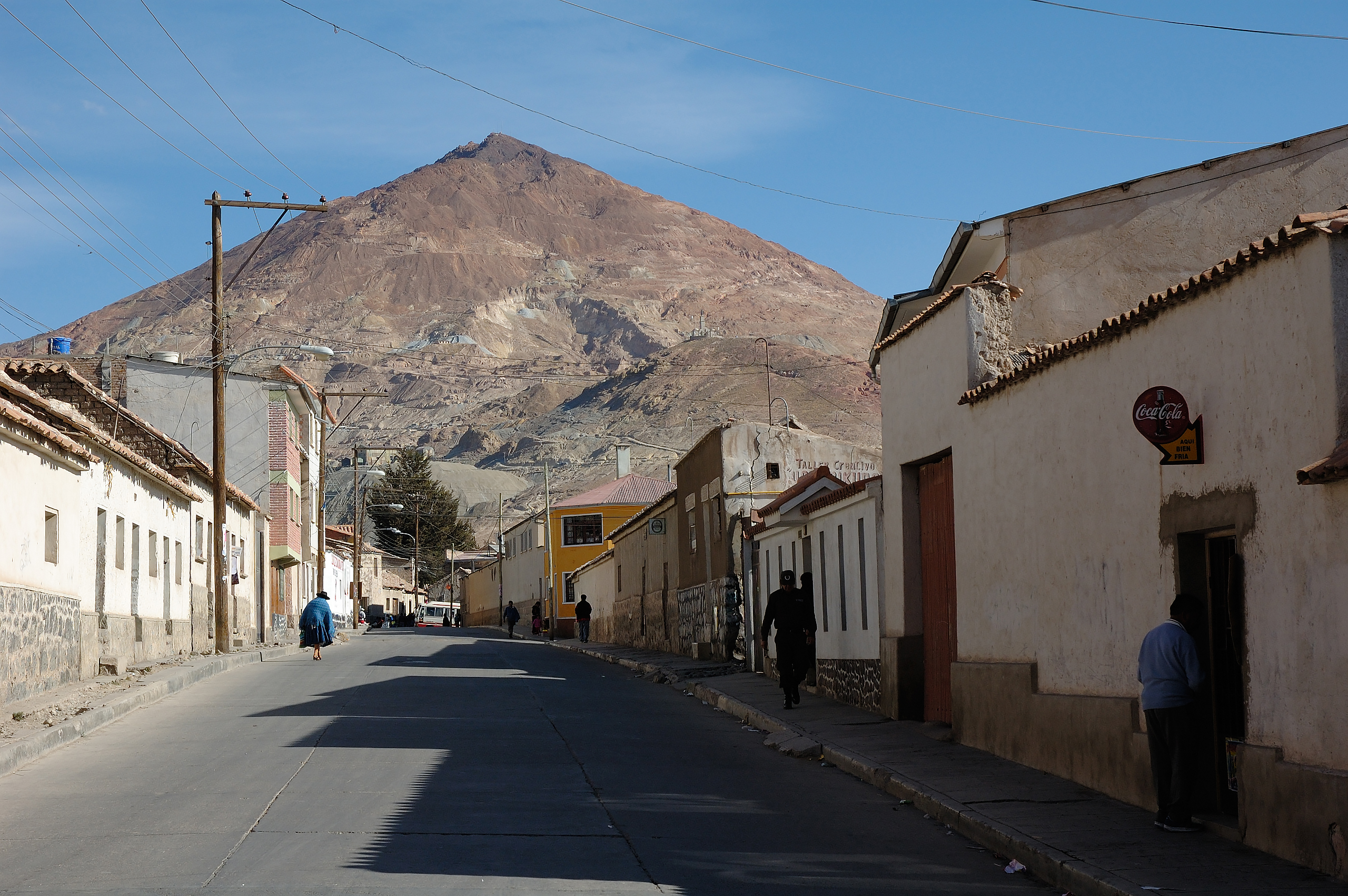
The Cerro Rico, from which the Spanish drew most of their silver

During most of the Spanish colonial period, this territory was under the authority of the Viceroyalty of Peru. Local government was implemented by the Real Audiencia of Charcas, located in Chuquisaca or La Plata (modern Sucre). Bolivian silver mines produced much of the Spanish Empires wealth, and Potosí, site of the famed Cerro Rico ("Rich Mountain") was for a couple of centuries the largest city in the Western Hemisphere.

The wealth of Upper Peru and its remoteness from Lima convinced the authorities to create a new audiencia in the city of Chuquisaca (present-day Sucre) in 1558. Chuquisaca had become particularly important as Potosí's administrative and agricultural supply center. The jurisdiction of the audiencia, known as Charcas, initially covered a radius of 100 leagues (1,796 km^{2}) around Chuquisaca, but it soon included Santa Cruz and territory belonging to present-day Paraguay and, until 1568, also the entire district of Cuzco. The president of the audiencia had judicial authority as well as administrative and executive powers in the region, but only in routine matters; more important decisions were made in Lima. This situation led to a competitive attitude and the reputation of Upper Peru for assertiveness, a condition reinforced by the economic importance of the region.

The longevity of Spain's empire in South America can be explained partly by the successful administration of the colonies and the integration of the people conquered. Spain was at first primarily interested in controlling the independent-minded conquerors, but its main goal soon became maintaining the flow of revenue to the crown and collecting the tribute of goods and labor from the Native American population. To this end, Spain soon created an elaborate bureaucracy in the New World, in which various institutions served as watchdogs over each other and local officials had considerable autonomy. Spain exercised its control of smaller administrative units in the colonies through royal officials, such as the corregidor, who represented the king in the municipal governments that were elected by their citizens. By the early 17th century, there were four corregidores in Upper Peru.

In the late 18th century, Spain undertook an administrative reform to increase revenues of the crown and eliminate a number of abuses. It created an intendancy system, giving extensive powers to highly qualified officials who were directly responsible to the king. In 1784, Spain established four intendancy districts in Upper Peru, covering the present-day departments of La Paz, Cochabamba, Potosí, and Chuquisaca. Upper Peru was joined to the new Viceroyalty of the Río de la Plata with capital in Buenos Aires) upon its creation in 1776. The viceroy was aided by the audiencia (council), which was simultaneously the highest court of appeal in the jurisdiction and, in the absence of the viceroy, also had administrative and executive powers.

=== Christianity ===
Along with the conquistadors came the Catholic clergy which began the conversion of native peoples to Christianity. In 1552 the first bishopric in Upper Peru was established in La Plata; in 1605 La Paz and Santa Cruz also became bishoprics. In 1623, the Jesuits established the Royal and Pontifical Higher University of San Francisco Xavier of Chuquisaca, Upper Peru's first university. The official Inca religion disappeared rapidly and Native Americans continued their local worship under the protection of local Native American rulers. As Christianity's influence grew, a new folk Catholicism developed, incorporating symbols of the indigenous religion. Whereas early Native American rebellions were anti-Christian, the revolts at the end of the 16th century were based in messianic Christian symbolism that was Roman Catholic and anti-Spanish. The church was tolerant of local Native American religions. In 1582 the bishop of La Plata permitted the building of a sanctuary for the dark statue of Our Lady of Copacabana on the shores of Lake Titicaca.

== Rebellions of native peoples ==
While many Native Americans adapted to Spanish ways by breaking with their traditions and actively attempting to enter the market economy, they also used the courts to protect their interests, especially against tribute assessments. Others clung to their customs as much as possible, and some rebelled against the white rulers. Local, mostly uncoordinated, rebellions occurred throughout colonial rule. More than 100 revolts occurred in the 18th century in Bolivia and Peru.

Native American resentment to colonial rule increased in the 18th century when Spain demanded higher tribute payments and increased mita obligations in an attempt to improve the mining output. It sparked the great rebellion of Túpac Amaru II. Born José Gabriel Condorcanqui, this educated, Spanish-speaking Native American took the name of his ancestor, Túpac Amaru. Although Túpac Amaru II insisted that his movement was reformist and did not seek to overthrow Spanish rule, his demands included an autonomous region. The uprising quickly became a full-scale revolt. Approximately 60,000 Native American in the Peruvian and Bolivian Andes rallied to the cause. After scoring some initial victories, including defeating a Spanish army of 1,200 men, Túpac Amaru II was captured and executed in May 1781; nonetheless, the revolt continued, primarily in Upper Peru. There, a supporter of Túpac Amaru II, the Native American chief Tomás Catari, had led an uprising in Potosí during the early months of 1780. Catari was killed by the Spaniards a month before Túpac Amaru II. Another major revolt was led by Julián Apaza, a sexton who took the names of the two rebel martyrs by calling himself Túpac Catari (also spelled Katari). He besieged La Paz for more than 100 days in 1781. During the siege, 20,000 people died. In 1782 an Aymara woman, Bartolina Sisa, was executed for raising yet another revolt. Spain did not succeed in putting down all of the revolts until 1783 and then proceeded to execute thousands of Native Americans.

== Struggle for independence ==
In the late 18th century, a growing discontent with Spanish rule developed among the criollos who began to assume active roles in the economy, especially in mining and agricultural production, and thus resented the trade barriers established by the mercantalist policies of the Spanish crown. In addition, criollos were incensed that Spain reserved all higher administrative positions for peninsulares (Spanish-born persons). The Enlightenment, with its emphasis on reason, questioning of authority and tradition, and individualistic tendencies, also contributed to criollo discontent. The Inquisition had not kept the writings of Niccolò Machiavelli, Benjamin Franklin, Thomas Paine, Jean-Jacques Rousseau, John Locke, and others out of Spanish America; their ideas were often discussed by criollos, especially those educated at the university in Chuquisaca. Although Upper Peru was fundamentally loyal to Spain, the ideas of the Enlightenment and independence from Spain continued to be discussed by scattered groups of radicals.

As Spanish royal authority weakened during the Napoleonic Wars, sentiment against colonial rule grew. Independence was proclaimed in 1809, but 16 years of struggle followed before the establishment of a republic named for Simón Bolívar. The invasion of the Iberian Peninsula in 1807–1808 by Napoleon's forces proved critical to the independence struggle in South America. The overthrow of the Bourbon Dynasty and the placement of Joseph Bonaparte on the Spanish throne tested the loyalty of the local elites in Upper Peru, who were suddenly confronted with several conflicting authorities. Most remained loyal to the Spanish Bourbons. Taking a wait-and-see attitude, they supported the Supreme Central Junta in Spain, a government which claimed to rule in the name of the abdicated Ferdinand VII. Some liberals eagerly welcomed the possible reforms to colonial rule promised by Joseph Bonaparte. A few officials supported the claims to a type of regency of the Spanish realms by Ferdinand's sister, Carlota, who at the moment governed from Brazil with her husband, Prince Regent John of Portugal. Finally, a small number of radical Criollos wanted independence for Upper Peru.

This conflict of authority resulted in a local power struggle in Upper Peru between 1808 and 1810, which constituted the first phase of the efforts to achieve independence. In 1808, the president of the Audiencia, Ramón García León de Pizarro, leaned towards affiliation with Carlotta. But the oidores of the Audiencia favored the Supreme Central Junta. On 25 May 1809, the oidores deposed President García León and established a junta to govern in the name of Ferdinand VII. On 16 July 1809, Pedro Domingo Murillo led another revolt by Criollos and Mestizos in La Paz and proclaimed an independent junta of Upper Peru, which would govern in the name of Ferdinand VII. By November 1809, Cochabamba, Oruro, and Potosí had joined the La Paz junta. Both revolts were put down by forces sent to La Paz by the viceroys of Peru and the Río de La Plata.

During the following seven years, Upper Peru became the battleground for forces of the United Provinces of the River Plate and royalist troops from Peru. Although the royalists repulsed three Argentine invasions, guerrillas controlled parts of the countryside, where they formed six major republiquetas, or zones of insurrection. In these zones, local patriotism eventually developed into a full fight for independence. By 1817, Upper Peru was relatively quiet and under the control of the Viceroyalty of Peru.

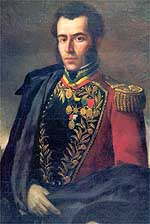
Antonio José de Sucre, hero of Ayacucho

After 1820, conservative Criollos supported General Pedro Antonio de Olañeta, a Charcas native, who refused to accept the restoration of the liberal Spanish Constitution of 1812. Olañeta, convinced that these measures threatened royal authority, refused to join either the liberal royalist forces or the rebel armies under the command of Bolívar and Antonio José de Sucre. Olañeta did not relinquish his command even after the Peruvian royalists included him and his forces in their capitulation agreement following their defeat in the Battle of Ayacucho in 1824. Olañeta was killed by his own men on 1 April 1825. A constitutional congress declared Bolivia an independent republic on 6 August and named the new republic in honor of Bolívar, because it wanted to gain his support for Bolivian independence from Peru.

== 19th century ==
Bolivia during the Peru-Bolivian Confederation

During the presidency of Marshal Andrés de Santa Cruz, Bolivia enjoyed the most successful period of their history with great social and economic advancement. Santa Cruz got involved in internal Peruvian political problems and succeeded in unifying Peru and Bolivia into a confederation, the Peru–Bolivian Confederation. As Santa Cruz openly declared the Inca Empire as a predecessor of his state, this move was perceived as a threat to regional power balance and a menace to countries on former Inca territory. The War of the Confederation broke out and different wars against almost all its neighbors were fought during this period with many sound victories against its enemies. Arguably, the turning point took place on the fields of Paucarpata, where the Confederation Peru-Bolivia, led by Santa Cruz, forced the Chilean and Peruvian rebel armies to sign the peace treaty known as the Paucarpata Treaty, which included their unconditional surrender; later this treaty was discarded by the Chilean parliament. The rebel Peruvians and the Chilean army set off to a new war against Santa Cruz, defeating the Confederation at the Battle of Yungay. This was the turning point in Bolivian history; after this moment, coups and short-lived constitutions dominated Bolivian politics for nearly 40 years.

The Atacama Desert and the Puna in 1830

Bolivia's military weakness was demonstrated during the War of the Pacific (1879–83), when it lost its Pacific seacoast and the adjoining nitrate rich fields to Chile. An increase in the world price of silver brought Bolivia a measure of relative prosperity and political stability in the late 1800s. During the early part of the 20th century, tin replaced silver as the country's most important source of wealth. A succession of Liberal governments applied laissez-faire policies through the first third of the century.

== 20th century ==
=== Early 20th century ===
Bolivia's territorial losses between the second half of the 19th century and first half of the 20th century

Living conditions of the indigenous peoples, who constituted most of the population, remained deplorable. Forced to work under primitive conditions in the mines and in nearly feudal status on large estates, they were denied access to education, economic opportunity, or political participation. Bolivia's defeat by Paraguay in the Chaco War (1932–1935) marked a turning point. Great loss of life and territory discredited the traditional ruling classes, while service in the army produced stirrings of political awareness among the indigenous people. In 1936, the Standard Oil was nationalized and the state-owned firm Yacimientos Petroliferos Fiscales Bolivianos (YPFB) was created. From the end of the Chaco War until the 1952 revolution, the emergence of contending ideologies and the demands of new groups convulsed Bolivian politics.

=== Bolivian National Revolution ===
Standing alongside the Mexican Revolution, the Bolivian National Revolution is one of the most significant sociopolitical events to occur in Latin America during the 20th century. The Revolutionary Nationalist Movement (MNR) emerged from the ashes of the Chaco War in 1941 as a middle-class political coalition eschewing Marxism for nationalism. The MNR participated in the military-civilian regime of Gualberto Villarroel (1943–46), and were elected to the 1944–1946 Bolivian National Convention but members were forced to resign in 1946 following the 1946 La Paz riots. The party initiated a brief but bloody civil war in October 1949, but was defeated and many key MNR leaders fled to Argentina. Despite being in exile, the MNR emerged victorious in the 1951 elections, but president Mamerto Urriolagoitía (1949–1951) refused to recognize the results and instead turned political power over to a military junta.

On 9 April 1952, the MNR led a successful revolt and set into motion the Bolivian National Revolution. Under President Víctor Paz Estenssoro, the MNR introduced universal adult suffrage, nationalized the country's largest tin mines, carried out a sweeping land reform, and promoted rural education. Notably, the state attempted to incorporate Aymara and Quechua peasants (that together constituted no less than 65 percent of the total population) into national life for the first time in Republican history. Although the policies pursued by the MNR were largely corporatist and assimilationist, it marked a significant turning point in Bolivia's contested history of indigenous-state relations. Following the 1952 revolution, the Bolivian state sought to strengthen its role in rural areas, implementing an extensive public health campaign that specifically included indigenous Bolivians.

=== Military rule ===
Twelve more tumultuous years of national reform left the MNR divided, and in a November 1964 coup d'état, a military junta led by vice-president René Barrientos overthrew President Paz Estenssoro at the outset of his third term. Many assert this change brought an end to the National Revolution and marked the beginning of nearly 20 years of military rule in Bolivia. Many scholars have looked to the CIA in explaining the November 1964 coup, but an increasing number of declassified US documents refute the claim. Towards the end of Paz's second term, Barrientos—a popular, Quechua-speaking general—had succeeded in co-opting the peasant unions formed in the wake of the 1953 agrarian reform, establishing the so-called Military-Peasant Pact (Pacto Militar-Campesino). Throughout the 1960s Barrientos leveled the peasant unions against labor unrest in the mines.

The 1969 death of Barrientos led to a succession of weak governments. A coup was led by the military, only to see a countercoup led by leftist Juan José Torres in October 1970. His government was quickly subjected to external pressure. US Ambassador Ernest Siracusa (who participated in the coup d'état against Jacobo Arbenz in Guatemala in 1954, then was expelled from Peru in 1968, accused of being a CIA man) ordered Torres to change his policies, threatening him with financial blockage. The World Bank and the Inter-American Development Bank refuse to grant the Torres government the loans necessary to pursue industrial development work. Torres' power was also unstable because he was supported only by a minority of the army and the country's middle class. The wealthy classes, part of the army, the right wing of the MNR and the Phalangist party plotted against him. After less than a year in power, Torres was overthrown in August 1971 in a bloody coup d'état led by the colonel Hugo Banzer, supported by the Brazilian military regime and the United States. Despite massive resistance – both civilian and military – the conservative forces had learned the lessons of the failed October, 1970 uprising, and applied brutality without compunction.

Banzer ruled with MNR support from 1971 to 1974, when, impatient with schisms in the coalition, he replaced civilians with members of the armed forces and suspended political activities. In the basement of the Ministry of the Interior or "the horror chambers" around 2,000 political prisoners were held and tortured during the 1971–1974 military rule. The economy grew impressively during Banzer's presidency, but demands for greater political freedom undercut his support. He called for elections in 1978 but voting irregularities plunged Bolivia into turmoil once again. Elections in 1978, 1979, and 1980 were inconclusive and marked by fraud. There were coups, counter-coups, and caretaker governments. In 1980, General Luis García Meza carried out a ruthless and violent coup. His government was notorious for human rights abuses, narcotics trafficking, and economic mismanagement. This led to a breakdown in relations with the US, which under both the Carter and Reagan administrations refused to recognize García's government due to its drug ties. Later convicted in absentia for crimes, including murder, García Meza was extradited from Brazil and began serving a 30-year sentence in 1995.

=== Transition to democracy ===
After a military rebellion forced out García Meza in 1981, three other military governments within 14 months struggled with Bolivia's growing problems. Unrest forced the military to convoke the Congress elected in 1980 and allowed it to choose a new chief executive.

== 1982 to present ==
In October 1982, 22 years after the end of his first term of office (1956–60), Hernán Siles Zuazo again became president. Severe social tension, exacerbated by economic mismanagement and weak leadership, forced him to call early elections and relinquish power a year before the end of his constitutional term. In the 1985 elections, the Nationalist Democratic Action Party (ADN) of Gen. Banzer won a plurality of the popular vote, followed by former President Paz Estenssoro's MNR and former Vice President Jaime Paz Zamora's Revolutionary Left Movement (MIR). In the congressional run-off, the MIR sided with MNR, and Paz Estenssoro was chosen for a fourth term as president. When he took office in 1985, he faced a staggering economic crisis. Economic output and exports had been declining for several years.

Hyperinflation had reached an annual rate of 24,000%. Social unrest, chronic strikes, and unchecked drug trafficking were widespread. In 4 years, Paz Estenssoro's administration achieved economic and social stability. The military stayed out of politics, and all major political parties publicly and institutionally committed themselves to democracy. Human rights violations, which badly tainted some governments earlier in the decade, were no longer a problem. However, his remarkable accomplishments were not won without sacrifice. The collapse of tin prices in October 1985, coming just as the government was moving to reassert its control of the mismanaged state mining enterprise, forced the government to lay off over 20,000 miners. Although the MNR list headed by Gonzalo Sánchez de Lozada finished first in the 1989 elections, no candidate received a majority of popular votes and so in accordance with the constitution, a congressional vote determined who would be president. The Patriotic Accord (AP) coalition between General Banzer's ADN and Jaime Paz Zamora's MIR, the second- and third-place finishers, respectively, won out. Paz Zamora assumed the presidency, and the MIR took half the ministries. Banzer's center-right ADN took control of the National Political Council (CONAP) and the other ministries.

Paz Zamora was a moderate, center-left President whose political pragmatism in office outweighed his Marxist origins. Having seen the destructive hyperinflation of the Siles Zuazo administration, he continued the neoliberal economic reforms begun by Paz Estenssoro. Paz Zamora took a fairly hard line against domestic terrorism, personally ordering the December 1990 attack on terrorists of the Néstor Paz Zamora Committee. Paz Zamora's regime was less decisive against narcotics trafficking. The government broke up a number of trafficking networks but issued a 1991 surrender decree giving lenient sentences to the biggest narcotics kingpins. Also, his administration was extremely reluctant to pursue coca eradication. It did not agree to an updated extradition treaty with the US, although two traffickers have been extradited to the US since 1992. Beginning in early 1994, the Bolivian Congress investigated Paz Zamora's personal ties to accused major trafficker Isaac Chavarria, who subsequently died in prison while awaiting trial. MIR deputy chief Oscar Eid was jailed in connection with similar ties in 1994; he was found guilty and sentenced to 4 years in prison in November 1996. Technically still under investigation, Paz Zamora became an active presidential candidate in 1996.

The 1993 elections continued the tradition of open, honest elections and peaceful democratic transitions of power. The MNR defeated the ADN/MIR coalition by a 33% to 20% margin, and the MNR's Sánchez de Lozada was selected as president by an MNR/MBL/UCS coalition in the Congress. Sánchez de Lozada pursued an aggressive economic and social reform agenda. The most dramatic change undertaken by the Sanchez de Lozada government was the capitalization program, under which investors acquired 50% ownership and management control of public enterprises, such as the Yacimientos Petroliferos Fiscales Bolivianos (YPFB) oil-corporation, telecommunications system, electric utilities, and others. The reforms and economic restructuring were strongly opposed by certain segments of society, which instigated frequent social disturbances, particularly in La Paz and the Chapare coca-growing region, from 1994 through 1996. In the 1997 elections, General Hugo Banzer, leader of the ADN, won 22% of the vote, while the MNR candidate won 18%. General Banzer formed a coalition of the ADN, MIR, UCS, and CONDEPA parties which hold a majority of seats in the Bolivian Congress. The Congress elected him as president and he was inaugurated on 6 August 1997.

=== 2000 Cochabamba protests ===
Between January and April 2000, a series of anti-privatization protests took place in Cochabamba against the privatization of the municipal water supply that was being pushed through on the recommendation of the World Bank and the International Monetary Fund. The Bolivian government declared martial law, killing several people, arresting protest leaders and shutting down radio stations. After continued disturbances and civic pressure, the government finally rolled back the privatization on 10 April 2000. In 2001, Bechtel filed suit against the Bolivian government, citing damages of more for $25 million. Bechtel argues that its contract was only to administer the water system, which suffered from terrible internal corruption and poor service, and that the local government raised water prices. The continuing legal battle attracted attention from anti-globalization and anti-capitalist groups. This topic is explored in the 2003 documentary film The Corporation and on Bechtel's website. In January 2006, Bechtel and the other international partners settled the lawsuit against the Bolivian government for a reported $0.30 (thirty cents) after intense protests and a ruling on jurisdiction favorable to Bechtel by the International Centre for the Settlement of Investment Disputes.

=== 2002 presidential election ===
President Hugo Banzer resigned in August 2001, due to being diagnosed with lung cancer. He was succeeded by his vice-president, Jorge Quiroga. In the 2002 presidential elections, Sánchez de Lozada ran again, and narrowly beat NFR's Manfred Reyes Villa and the cocalero and indigenous leader Evo Morales of the Movement Toward Socialism (MAS) party. Several days before Bolivians went to the voting booths, the US ambassador, Manuel Rocha, warned the Bolivian electorate that, if they voted for Morales, the US would cut off foreign aid and close its markets to the country. Morales nonetheless received nearly 21% of the vote, putting him only a couple points behind Sánchez de Lozada.

=== Black October ===
In the early 2000s, an increasingly divisive conflict has been the Bolivian Gas War; a dispute over the exploitation of Bolivia's large natural gas reserves in the south of the country. Strikes and blockades first erupted in September 2003, with several deaths and dozens of injuries in confrontations with the armed forces. President Gonzalo Sánchez de Lozada resigned under pressure from protesters, formally handing over the presidency to his vice-president, Carlos Mesa, in order to preserve the сonstitutional order. Lozada fled the country to the United States. Mesa was inaugurated and promised to address the demands of the protesting majority. In the face of mounting protests, he resigned on 7 March 2005, claiming he was unable to continue governing the country. With promises of support, he withdrew his resignation. In May–June 2005, Mesa again tendered his resignation and in a hastily convened session of the Parliament in Sucre, the then Supreme Court president Eduardo Rodríguez Veltzé became president on the night of 9 June 2005. Political agreements were reached to modify the Constitution, and allow the full renewal of Parliament, simultaneously with a Presidential Election, on 4 December 2005.

=== Evo Morales administration ===
The deterioration of the political system contributed towards the rise of a loose confederation of indigenous social movements, the MAS and other parties, with the head of the MAS, Evo Morales, a former cocalero, as leader. In the elections of December 2005, Morales and MAS obtained a comfortable victory reaching 54% of the electorate's votes, becoming the first Indigenous Bolivian president in history. On 1 May 2006, Morales delivered on his promises to nationalize most of Bolivia's natural gas fields, which many indigenous Bolivians had demanded for years. Troops were sent in to occupy the gas fields and take back control from foreign companies that same day. Many were operated by Petrobras, Brazil's largest energy company, and this political development was expected to strain relations between Morales and Brazilian president Luiz Inácio Lula da Silva. On 29 October 2006, the Morales government signed agreements with eight foreign gas firms including Petrobras, to give the Bolivian national gas company a majority stake in the gas fields, bringing the nationalization to completion. In August 2007, a conflict which came to be known as The Calancha Case arose in Sucre. Local citizens demanded that an official discussion of the seat of government be included in the agenda of the full body of the Bolivian Constituent Assembly. The people of Sucre wanted to make Sucre the full capital of the country, including returning the executive and legislative branches to the city, but the government rejected the demand as impractical. Three people died in the conflict and as many as 500 were wounded. The result of the conflict was to include text in the constitution stating that the capital of Bolivia is officially Sucre, while leaving the executive and legislative branches in La Paz. In May 2008, Morales was a signatory to the UNASUR Constitutive Treaty of the Union of South American Nations.

In late August 2007, the MAS purged the Constitutional Tribunal of magistrates that voted earlier in the year against Morales' move to fill Supreme Court vacancies while Congress was in recess. The purge dismantled the outlet for arbitration between branches of government. On 4 May 2008, autonomy referendums were held in four eastern departments, in which they declared themselves autonomous from the central government. All four referendums passed. Morales deemed this referendum illegal in part due to the low turnout. In February 2009, a new constitution was enacted by Morales. This gave Bolivians of indigenous descent more economic and political rights. Between 2006 and 2014, GDP per capita doubled and the extreme poverty rate declined from 38 to 18%. Moreover, the Gini coefficient (a measure of statistical dispersion intended to represent the income or wealth distribution of a nation's residents) declined from 0.60 to 0.47.

Morales was re-elected in 2009. His second term witnessed the continuation of leftist policies and Bolivia's joining of the Bank of the South and Community of Latin American and Caribbean States; he was again reelected in the 2014 general election. On 17 October 2015, Morales surpassed Andrés de Santa Cruz's nine years, eight months, and twenty-four days in office and became Bolivia's longest serving president. During the 2019 elections, the transmission of the unofficial quick counting process was interrupted; at the time, Morales had a lead of 46.86 percent to Mesa's 36.72, after 95.63 percent of tally sheets were counted. The quick count process is used in Latin America as a transparency measure in electoral processes that is meant to provide a preliminary result on election day, and its shutdown without further explanation raised consternation among opposition politicians and certain election monitors. Two days after the interruption, the official count showed Morales fractionally clearing the 10-point margin he needed to avoid a runoff election, with the final official tally counted as 47.08 percent to Mesa's 36.51 percent, starting a wave of protests and tension in the country.

Amidst allegations of fraud perpetrated by the Morales government, widespread protests were organized to dispute the election. On 10 November, the Organization of American States (OAS) released a preliminary report concluding several irregularities in the election, though these findings were heavily disputed. The Center for Economic and Policy Research (CEPR) concluded that "it is very likely that Morales won the required 10 percentage point margin to win in the first round of the election on 20 October 2019." David Rosnick, an economist for CEPR, showed that "a basic coding error" was discovered in the OAS's data, which explained that the OAS had misused its own data when it ordered the time stamps on the tally sheets alphabetically rather than chronologically. However, the OAS stood by its findings arguing that the "researchers' work did not address many of the allegations mentioned in the OAS report, including the accusation that Bolivian officials maintained hidden servers that could have permitted the alteration of results". Additionally, observers from the European Union released a report with similar findings and conclusions as the OAS. The tech security company hired by the TSE (under the Morales administration) to audit the elections, also stated that there were multiple irregularities and violations of procedure and that "our function as an auditor security company is to declare everything that was found, and much of what was found supports the conclusion that the electoral process should be declared null and void". The New York Times reported on 7 June 2020 that the OAS analysis immediately after the 20 October election was flawed yet fuelled "a chain of events that changed the South American nation's history".

Following the disputed 2019 general election and the ensuing unrest, in events characterized as a coup d'état by supporters of Morales, the president resigned, declaring that he did so to "protect the families of Movement for Socialism members". Morales flew to Mexico and was granted asylum there, along with his vice president and several other members of his government. Morales, his supporters, the Governments of Mexico and Nicaragua, and other personalities argued the event was a coup d'état. However, local investigators and analysts pointed out that even after Morales' resignation and during all of Añez's term in office, the Chambers of Senators and Deputies were ruled by Morales' political party MAS, making it impossible to be a coup d'état, as such an event would not allow the original government to maintain legislative power.

=== Political crisis and Luis Arce administration ===
After the 2019 Bolivian political crisis that saw President Evo Morales's resignation, Interim President Jeanine Áñez called new presidential elections. The elections took place on 18 October 2020 and Luis Arce, endorsed by Morales, a candidate from the Movement for Socialism who previously served as Minister of Economy and Public Finance in the Morales administration, won them. On 8 November 2020, Luis Arce was sworn in as president of Bolivia alongside his Vice President David Choquehuanca. On 12 March 2021 the government ordered the arrest of Jeanine Áñez, the former Interim President, and five members of her government for terrorism, sedition, and conspiracy. According to the prosecutors, she and the ministers took part in a coup against Morales in 2019. According to the Bolivian Institute of Foreign Trade, Bolivia had the lowest accumulated inflation of Latin America by October 2021. As of July 2024, there was a deep internal division within the ruling party MAS-IPSP (the Movement towards Socialism – Instrument for the Sovereignty of the People) between the supporters of president Luis Arce and former president Morales. In November 2024, Bolivia’s constitutional court prohibited Evo Morales from running for president in next year’s presidential election. In December 2024, Bolivia extradited its former anti-drugs director Maximiliano Dávila to the United States to face drug trafficking charges. In February 2025, Evo Morales presented his formal resignation from the ruling Movement Towards Socialism (MAS). He was running for president in the Aug. 17 elections with the Front for Victory (FPV). In May 2025, President Luis Arce announced that he would not seek re-election. In May 2025, Bolivia’s top electoral tribunal also disqualified Evo Morales from running in the presidential election.

In October 2025, Rodrigo Paz of the centre-right Christian Democratic Party (PDC) won the run-off race of the election against right-wing former president Jorge Quiroga, meaning the end of governance by the Movement for Socialism (MAS) party and a clear political shift to the right.

On 6 November 2025, former interim president Jeanine Áñez was freed from prison after almost five years, following supreme court ruling that overturned her 10-year prison sentence.

=== Rodrigo Paz administration ===
On 8 November 2025, Rodrigo Paz was sworn in as Bolivia’s new president during Bolivia's worst economic crisis in 40 years.

In December 2025, Bolivia's former president Luis Arce was arrested as a part of corruption allegations.

Bolivian relations with the United States improved significantly under president Rodrigo Paz. Bolivia joined the "Shield of the Americas", the US-led security initiative in the Western Hemisphere. In March 2016, Paz participated the inaugural "Shield of the Americas" summit in Florida.

== See also ==
- Bolivia–United States relations
- Charca people
- History of Bolivian nationality
- History of Latin America
- History of South America

== Bibliography ==
=== Surveys ===
- Hudson, Rex A.; Hanratty, Dennis Michael, eds. (1991). Bolivia: a country study. Washington, D.C.: Federal Research Division, Library of Congress. This article incorporates text from this source, which is in the public domain.
- Crabtree, John, and Laurence Whitehead, eds. Unresolved tensions: Bolivia past and present (2008) excerpt
- Heath, Dwight B. Historical dictionary of Bolivia (1972) online
- Klein, Herbert S. A Concise History of Bolivia (2nd ed. Cambridge UP, 2021) excerpt; also 2003 edition online
- Morales, Waltraud Q. A brief history of Bolivia (2nd ed. Infobase Publishing, 2010) online.
- Thomson, Sinclair, et al., eds. The Bolivia Reader: History, Culture, Politics (Duke University Press, 2018).
- Young, Kevin A. Blood of the earth: resource nationalism, revolution, and empire in Bolivia (University of Texas Press, 2017).

=== Specialty studies ===
- Alexander, Robert Jackson, and Eldon M. Parker. A history of organized labor in Bolivia (Greenwood, 2005).
- Aspiazu, Agustín et al. A Collection of Pamphlets on the History of Bolivia in the Second Half of The Nineteenth Century (1900) online in Spanish
- Crabtree, John, et al. The Great Tin Crash: Bolivia and the World Tin Market (1987) excerpt
- Dangl, Benjamin. The Five Hundred Year Rebellion: Indigenous Movements and the Decolonization of History in Bolivia (AK Press, 2019).
- Dorn, Glenn J. The Truman Administration and Bolivia: Making the World Safe for Liberal Constitutional Oligarchy (2011) https://doi.org/10.1515/9780271056869
- Dunkerley, James. Bolivia : revolution and the power of history in the present: essays (2007) online
- Fabricant, Nicole, and Nancy Postero. "Sacrificing indigenous bodies and lands: The political–economic history of lowland Bolivia in light of the recent TIPNIS debate." The Journal of Latin American and Caribbean anthropology 20.3 (2015): 452–474.
- Farthing, Linda C., and Benjamin H. Kohl. Evo's Bolivia: Continuity and Change (2014) excerpt
- Field, Thomas C. From development to dictatorship: Bolivia and the alliance for progress in the Kennedy era (Cornell University Press, 2014).
- Lehman, Kenneth D. "Completing the revolution? The United States and Bolivia’s long revolution." Bolivian Studies Journal 22 (2016): 4–35 online.
- Lehman, Kenneth Duane. Bolivia and the United States: A limited partnership (University of Georgia Press, 1999).
- Ribando, Clare, ed. "Bolivia: Political and economic developments and relations with the United States." (Congressional Research Service, 2006) online.
- Storli, Espen. "The Birth of the World’s Largest Tin Merchant: Philipp Brothers, Bolivian Tin and American Stockpiles." in Tin and Global Capitalism, 1850–2000 (Routledge, 2014) pp. 222–240.
- Webber, Jeffery R. From Rebellion to Reform in Bolivia: Class Struggle, Indigenous Liberation, and the Politics of Evo Morales (2011)
- Wolff, Jonas. "Re-engaging Latin America‘s Left?." in US Relations with Bolivia and Ecuador from Bush to Obama (PRIF Report 103, 2011). online
