= Cabinet of Evo Morales =

Bolivian presidential administration and ministerial cabinet from 2006 to 2019

Morales cabinet
- 210th–220th Cabinet of Bolivia (Note: 210th–213th Cabinet of the Republic of Bolivia; 1st–7th Cabinet of the Plurinational State of Bolivia.)
- 2006–2019
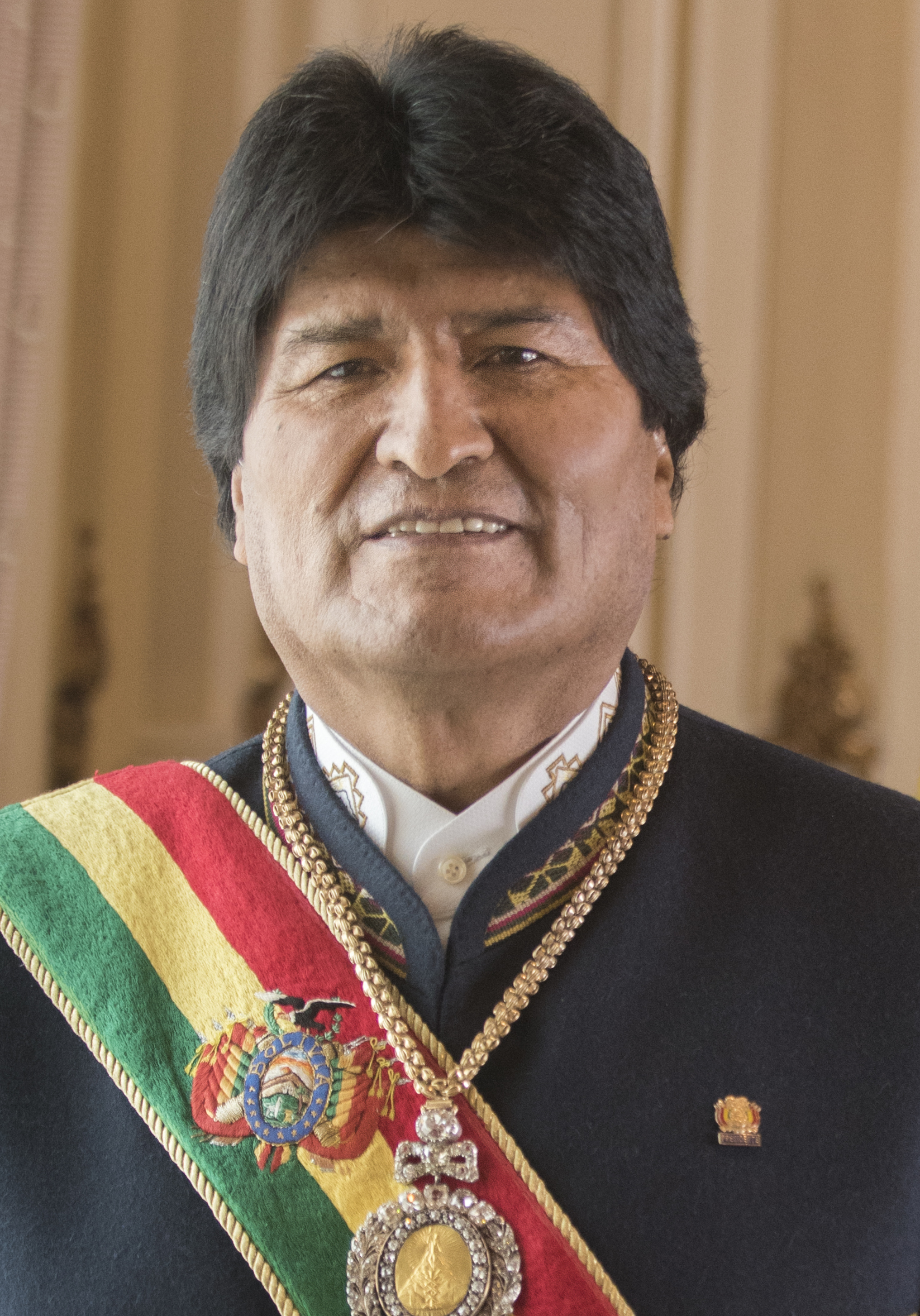
- Date formed: 23 January 2006
- Date dissolved: 10 November 2019

People and organisations
- President: Evo Morales
- Vice President: Álvaro García Linera
- No. of ministers: 19
- Total no. of members: 113 (incl. former members)
- Member party: Movement for Socialism
- Status in legislature: Majority government (2006–2010); Supermajority government (2010–2019)

History
- Elections: 2005 general election 2009 general election 2014 general election 2019 general election (Note: Annulled.)
- Legislature terms: 2006–2010; 2010–2015; 2015–2020
- Predecessor: Cabinet of Eduardo Rodríguez Veltzé
- Successor: Cabinet of Jeanine Áñez

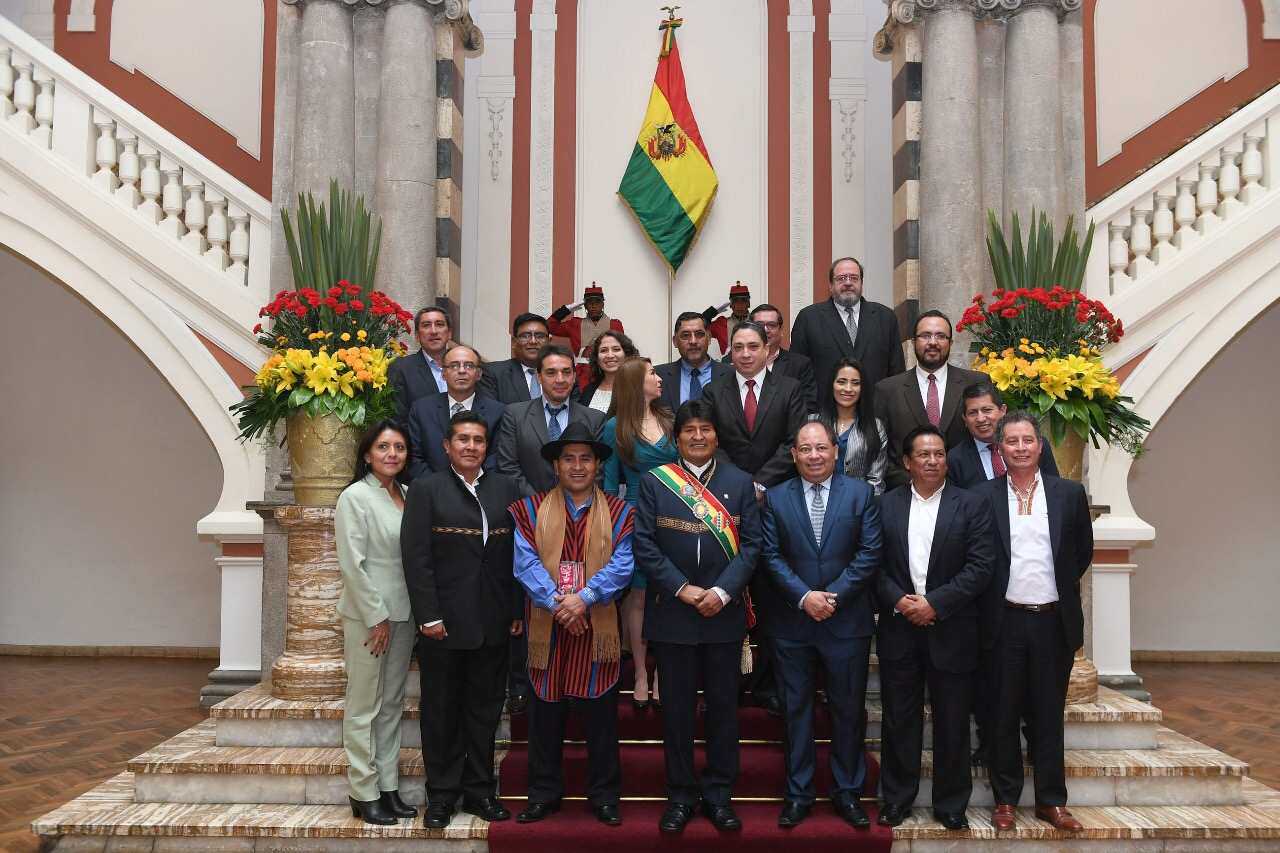
Morales with his tenth cabinet in January 2018.

The Cabinet of Evo Morales constituted the 210th to 220th cabinets of the Plurinational State of Bolivia. (Note: Until 2009, the Republic of Bolivia.) It was initially formed on 23 January 2006, a day after Evo Morales was sworn-in as the 65th president of Bolivia.

== Cabinet ministers ==
Portfolio	Minister	Party	Prof.	Took office	Left office	Term	Ref.
President	Evo Morales	MAS	Coc.	22 January 2006	10 November 2019	5,040	
Vice President	Álvaro García Linera	MAS	Soc.	22 January 2006	10 November 2019	5,040	
Minister of Foreign Affairs	David Choquehuanca	MAS	Uni.	23 January 2006	23 January 2017	4,018	
Minister of Foreign Affairs	Fernando Huanacuni Mamani	MAS	Law.	23 January 2017	4 September 2018	589	
Minister of Foreign Affairs	Diego Pary Rodríguez	MAS	Prof.	4 September 2018	10 November 2019	432	
Minister of the Presidency	Juan Ramón Quintana	MAS	Soc.	23 January 2006	23 January 2010	1,461	
Minister of the Presidency	Óscar Coca	MAS	B.A.	23 January 2010	14 June 2011	507	
Minister of the Presidency	Carlos Romero	MAS	Law.	14 June 2011	23 January 2012	223	
Minister of the Presidency	Juan Ramón Quintana	MAS	Soc.	23 January 2012	23 January 2017	1,827	
Minister of the Presidency	René Martínez Callahuanca	MAS	Law.	23 January 2017	23 January 2018	365	
Minister of the Presidency	Alfredo Rada	MAS	Soc.	23 January 2018	23 January 2019	730	
Minister of the Presidency	Juan Ramón Quintana	MAS	Soc.	23 January 2019	10 November 2019	291	
Minister of Government	Alicia Muñoz	MAS	Anth.	23 January 2006	23 January 2007	365	
Minister of Government	Alfredo Rada	MAS	Soc.	23 January 2007	23 January 2010	1,096	
Minister of Government	Sacha Llorenti	MAS	Law.	23 January 2010	27 September 2011	612	
Minister of Government	Wilfredo Chávez	MAS	Law.	27 September 2011	23 January 2012	118	
Minister of Government	Carlos Romero	MAS	Law.	23 January 2012	15 July 2014	904	
Minister of Government	Jorge Pérez Valenzuela	MAS	Law.	15 July 2014	23 January 2015	192	
Minister of Government	Hugo Moldiz	MAS	Law.	23 January 2015	25 May 2015	122	
Minister of Government	Office vacant 25 May 2015 – 26 May 2015					1	
Minister of Government	Carlos Romero	MAS	Law.	26 May 2015	10 November 2019	1,630	
Minister of National Defense	Walker San Miguel	MAS	Law.	23 January 2006	8 February 2009	1,461	
Minister of Defense	Walker San Miguel	MAS	Law.	8 February 2009	23 January 2010	1,461	
Minister of Defense	Rubén Saavedra	MAS	Eco.	23 January 2010	5 April 2011	1,898	
Minister of Defense	Office vacant 5 April 2011 – 6 April 2011					1	(Note: Acting Minister of Defense designated to Sacha Llorenti, Minister of Government, until a new holder is appointed.)
Minister of Defense	María Cecilia Chacón	MAS	Law.	6 April 2011	26 September 2011	173	
Minister of Defense	Office vacant 26 September 2011 – 27 September 2011					1	
Minister of Defense	Rubén Saavedra	MAS	Eco.	27 September 2011	23 January 2015	1,214	
Minister of Defense	Jorge Ledezma	MAS	Law.	23 January 2015	31 March 2015	67	
Minister of Defense	Reymi Ferreira	MAS	Law.	31 March 2015	23 January 2018	1,029	
Minister of Defense	Javier Eduardo Zavaleta	MAS	Arch.	23 January 2018	10 November 2019	656	
Minister of Development Planning	Carlos Villegas	MAS	Eco.	23 January 2006	15 September 2006	235	
Minister of Development Planning	Hernando Larrazabal	MAS	Eco.	15 September 2006	23 January 2007	130	
Minister of Development Planning	Gabriel Loza Tellería	MAS	Eco.	23 January 2007	8 September 2008	594	
Minister of Development Planning	Carlos Villegas	MAS	Eco.	8 September 2008	8 February 2009	153	
Minister of Development Planning	Noel Aguirre	MAS	Prof.	8 February 2009	23 January 2010	349	
Minister of Development Planning	Viviana Caro Hinojosa	MAS	Eco.	23 January 2010	23 January 2015	1,810	
Minister of Development Planning	René Gonzalo Orellana	MAS	Law.	23 January 2015	23 January 2017	3,959	
Minister of Development Planning	Mariana Prado	MAS	B.A.	23 January 2017	10 November 2019	1,021	
Minister of Finance	Luis Arce	MAS	Eco.	23 January 2006	8 February 2009	4,172	
Minister of Economy and Public Finance	Luis Arce	MAS	Eco.	8 February 2009	24 June 2017	4,172	
Minister of Economy and Public Finance	Office vacant 24 June 2017 – 26 June 2017					2	
Minister of Economy and Public Finance	Mario Guillén	MAS	Eng.	26 June 2017	23 January 2019	576	
Minister of Economy and Public Finance	Luis Arce	MAS	Eco.	23 January 2019	10 November 2019	291	
Minister of Hydrocarbons	Andrés Soliz Rada	MAS	Jrnl.	23 January 2006	15 September 2006	235	
Minister of Hydrocarbons and Energies	Carlos Villegas	MAS	Eco.	15 September 2006	8 September 2008	724	
Minister of Hydrocarbons and Energies	Saúl Ávalos Cortez	MAS	Law.	8 September 2008	8 February 2009	153	
Minister of Hydrocarbons and Energies	Óscar Coca	MAS	B.A.	8 February 2009	23 January 2010	349	
Minister of Hydrocarbons and Energies	Luis Fernando Vincenti	MAS	Eng.	23 January 2010	23 January 2011	365	
Minister of Hydrocarbons and Energies	José Luis Gutierrez Pérez	MAS	Eng.	23 January 2011	23 January 2012	365	
Minister of Hydrocarbons and Energies	Juan José Sosa	MAS	Eng.	23 January 2012	23 January 2015	1,096	
Minister of Hydrocarbons and Energies	Luis Alberto Sánchez	MAS	Eng.	23 January 2015	22 January 2017	1,752	
Minister of Hydrocarbons	Luis Alberto Sánchez	MAS	Eng.	22 January 2017	10 November 2019	1,752	
Minister of Energies	Office vacant 22 January 2017 – 23 January 2017					1	
Minister of Energies	Rafael Alarcón	MAS	Eng.	23 January 2017	10 November 2019	1,021	
Minister of Production and Microenterprises	Celinda Sosa Lunda	MAS	Prof.	23 January 2006	23 January 2008	730	
Minister of Production and Microenterprises	Ángel Hurtado	MAS	Soc.	23 January 2008	8 September 2008	229	
Minister of Production and Microenterprises	Susana Rivero Guzmán	MAS	Law.	8 September 2008	8 February 2009	502	
Minister of Productive Development and the Plural Economy	Susana Rivero Guzmán	MAS	Law.	8 February 2009	23 January 2010	502	
Minister of Productive Development and the Plural Economy	Antonia Rodríguez Medrano	MAS	Uni.	23 January 2010	23 January 2011	365	
Minister of Productive Development and the Plural Economy	Ana Teresa Morales	MAS	Eco.	23 January 2011	23 January 2015	1,461	
Minister of Productive Development and the Plural Economy	Verónica Ramos	MAS	Eco.	23 January 2015	23 January 2017	3,959	
Minister of Productive Development and the Plural Economy	Eugenio Rojas	MAS	Soc.	23 January 2017	23 January 2019	730	
Minister of Productive Development and the Plural Economy	Nélida Sifuentes Cueto	MAS	Uni.	23 January 2019	10 November 2019	291	
Minister of Services and Public Works	Salvador Ric Riera	MAS	Entr.	23 January 2006	23 January 2007	365	
Minister of Public Works, Services, and Housing	Jerges Mercado Suárez	MAS	Eng.	23 January 2007	7 September 2007	227	
Minister of Public Works, Services, and Housing	José Kinn Franco	MAS	Eng.	7 September 2007	23 January 2008	138	
Minister of Public Works, Services, and Housing	Óscar Coca	MAS	B.A.	23 January 2008	8 February 2009	382	
Minister of Public Works, Services, and Housing	Walter Delgadillo	MIR	Anth.	8 February 2009	23 January 2012	1,079	
Minister of Public Works, Services, and Housing	Vladimir Sánchez	MAS	Eco.	23 January 2012	23 January 2015	1,096	
Minister of Public Works, Services, and Housing	Milton Claros	MAS	Eng.	23 January 2015	23 January 2019	1,461	
Minister of Public Works, Services, and Housing	Óscar Coca	MAS	B.A.	23 January 2019	10 November 2019	291	
Minister of Mining and Metallurgy	Wálter Villarroel	MAS	–	23 January 2006	6 October 2006	256	
Minister of Mining and Metallurgy	José Dalence	MAS	Uni.	6 October 2006	28 March 2007	173	
Minister of Mining and Metallurgy	Luis Alberto Echazú	MAS	Eng.	28 March 2007	23 January 2010	1,032	
Minister of Mining and Metallurgy	Milton Gómez	MAS	Uni.	23 January 2010	28 January 2010	5	
Minister of Mining and Metallurgy	José Antonio Pimentel	MAS	Uni.	28 January 2010	23 January 2012	725	
Minister of Mining and Metallurgy	Mario Virreira	MAS	Eng.	23 January 2012	23 January 2015	1,096	
Minister of Mining and Metallurgy	César Navarro	MAS	Law.	23 January 2015	10 November 2019	1,752	
Minister without portfolio responsible for Justice	Casimira Rodríguez	MAS	D.W.	23 January 2006	23 January 2007	365	
Minister of Justice	Celima Torrico	MAS	Uni.	23 January 2007	23 January 2010	1,096	
Minister of Justice	Nilda Copa Condori	MAS	Uni.	23 January 2010	23 January 2012	730	
Minister of Justice	Cecilia Luisa Ayllón	MAS	Law.	23 January 2012	23 January 2014	731	
Minister of Justice	Elizabeth Sandra Gutiérrez	MAS	Law.	23 January 2014	23 January 2015	365	
Minister of Justice	Virginia Velasco Condori	MAS	Law.	23 January 2015	22 January 2017	731	
Minister of Justice and Institutional Transparency	Virginia Velasco Condori	MAS	Law.	22 January 2017	23 January 2017	731	
Minister of Justice and Institutional Transparency	Héctor Enrique Arce	MAS	Law.	23 January 2017	10 November 2019	1,021	
Minister of Labor	Santiago Álex Gálvez	MAS	Man.	23 January 2006	23 January 2007	365	
Minister of Labor	Walter Delgadillo	MIR	Anth.	23 January 2007	8 February 2009	747	
Minister of Labor, Employment, and Social Security	Calixto Chipana Callisaya	MAS	Uni.	8 February 2009	23 January 2010	349	
Minister of Labor, Employment, and Social Security	Carmen Trujillo Cárdenas	MAS	Uni.	23 January 2010	15 February 2011	388	
Minister of Labor, Employment, and Social Security	Félix Rojas	MAS	Law.	15 February 2011	23 January 2012	342	
Minister of Labor, Employment, and Social Security	Daniel Santalla	MAS	Uni.	23 January 2012	23 January 2015	1,096	
Minister of Labor, Employment, and Social Security	José Gonzalo Trigoso Agudo	MAS	Law.	23 January 2015	23 January 2017	731	
Minister of Labor, Employment, and Social Security	Héctor Hinojosa Rodríguez	MAS	Prof.	23 January 2017	23 January 2019	730	
Minister of Labor, Employment, and Social Security	Milton Gómez	MAS	Uni.	23 January 2019	10 November 2019	291	
Minister of Health and Sports	Nila Heredia	POR	Dr.	23 January 2006	23 January 2008	730	
Minister of Health and Sports	Wálter Selum Rivero	MAS	Card.	23 January 2008	8 September 2008	229	
Minister of Health and Sports	Jorge Ramiro Tapia	MAS	Surg.	8 September 2008	23 January 2010	502	
Minister of Health and Sports	Sonia Polo	MAS	Den.	23 January 2010	16 May 2010	113	
Minister of Health and Sports	Nila Heredia	POR	Dr.	16 May 2010	23 January 2012	617	
Minister of Health and Sports	Juan Carlos Calvimontes	MAS	Dr.	23 January 2012	22 January 2014	1,096	
Minister of Health	Juan Carlos Calvimontes	MAS	Dr.	22 January 2014	23 January 2015	1,096	
Minister of Health	Ariana Campero	MAS	Dr.	23 January 2015	30 May 2018	1,223	
Minister of Health	Rodolfo Rocabado	MAS	Dr.	30 May 2018	23 January 2019	238	
Minister of Health	Gabriela Montaño	MAS	Phys.	23 January 2019	10 November 2019	291	
Minister without portfolio responsible for Water	Abel Mamani	MAS	Uni.	23 January 2006	23 January 2007	673	
Minister of Water	Abel Mamani	MAS	Uni.	23 January 2007	27 November 2007	673	
Minister of Water	Wálter Valda Rivera	MAS	Agr.	27 November 2007	1 April 2008	126	
Minister of Water	René Gonzalo Orellana	MAS	Law.	1 April 2008	8 February 2009	662	
Minister of Environment and Water	René Gonzalo Orellana	MAS	Law.	8 February 2009	23 January 2010	662	
Minister of Environment and Water	María Udaeta	MAS	Uni.	23 January 2010	23 January 2011	365	
Minister of Environment and Water	Julieta Mabel Monje	MAS	Prof.	23 January 2011	23 January 2012	365	
Minister of Environment and Water	Felipe Quispe Quenta	MAS	Law.	23 January 2012	21 August 2012	211	
Minister of Environment and Water	José Antonio Zamora	MAS	Eco.	21 August 2012	23 January 2015	885	
Minister of Environment and Water	Alejandra Moreira López	MAS	Law.	23 January 2015	23 January 2017	731	
Minister of Environment and Water	Carlos René Ortuño	MAS	Eng.	23 January 2017	10 November 2019	1,021	
Minister of Education and Cultures	Félix Patzi	MAS	Soc.	23 January 2006	23 January 2007	365	
Minister of Education and Cultures	Víctor Cáceres Rodríguez	PCB	Prof.	23 January 2007	8 June 2007	136	
Minister of Education and Cultures	Magdalena Cajías	IND	Hist.	8 June 2007	7 November 2008	518	
Minister of Education and Cultures	Roberto Aguilar	MAS	Eco.	7 November 2008	8 February 2009	4,020	
Minister of Education	Roberto Aguilar	MAS	Eco.	8 February 2009	10 November 2019	4,020	
Minister of Peasant, Indigenous, and Agricultural Affairs charged with Rural and Agricultural Development	Hugo Salvatierra Gutiérrez	MAS	Law.	23 January 2006	23 January 2007	365	
Minister of Rural Development, Agriculture, and Environment	Susana Rivero Guzmán	MAS	Law.	23 January 2007	8 September 2008	594	
Minister of Rural Development, Agriculture, and Environment	Carlos Romero	MAS	Law.	8 September 2008	8 February 2009	153	
Minister of Rural Development and Lands	Julia Ramos	MAS	Uni.	8 February 2009	23 January 2010	349	
Minister of Rural Development and Lands	Nemesia Achacollo	MAS	Uni.	23 January 2010	31 August 2015	2,046	
Minister of Rural Development and Lands	César Cocarico	MAS	Law.	31 August 2015	10 November 2019	1,532	
Minister without portfolio responsible for the Legal Defense of State Recoveries	Héctor Enrique Arce	MAS	Law.	5 May 2008	8 February 2009	490	
Minister for the Legal Defense of the State	Héctor Enrique Arce	MAS	Law.	8 February 2009	7 September 2009	490	
Minister for the Legal Defense of the State	María Cecilia Rocabado	MAS	Law.	7 September 2009	24 December 2009	108	
Minister for the Legal Defense of the State	Pablo Menacho Diederich	MAS	Law.	24 December 2009	23 January 2010	30	
Minister for the Legal Defense of the State	Elizabeth Arismendi	MAS	Law.	23 January 2010	7 February 2011	380	
Minister for the Legal Defense of the State	Office merged with the Attorney General's Office						(Note: Ministry functions transferred to the Deputy Attorney for Defense and Legal Representation of the State.)
Minister of Autonomies	Office vacant 7 February 2009 – 8 February 2009					1	
Minister of Autonomies	Carlos Romero	MAS	Law.	8 February 2009	14 June 2011	856	
Minister of Autonomies	Claudia Peña Claros	MAS	Wri.	14 June 2011	23 January 2015	1,319	
Minister of Autonomies	Hugo Siles Núñez del Prado	MAS	Prof.	23 January 2015	22 January 2017	730	
Minister of Autonomies	Office merged with the Ministry of the Presidency						(Note: Ministry functions transferred to the Vice Ministry of Autonomies.)
Minister of Institutional Transparency and the Fight Against Corruption	Office vacant 7 February 2009 – 8 February 2009					1	
Minister of Institutional Transparency and the Fight Against Corruption	Nardi Suxo	MAS	Law.	8 February 2009	23 January 2015	2,175	
Minister of Institutional Transparency and the Fight Against Corruption	Lenny Tatiana Valdivia	MAS	Law.	23 January 2015	22 January 2017	730	
Minister of Institutional Transparency and the Fight Against Corruption	Office merged with the Ministry of Justice						(Note: Ministry functions transferred to the Vice Ministry of Institutional Transparency and the Fight Against Corruption.)
Minister of Cultures	Office vacant 7 February 2009 – 8 February 2009					1	
Minister of Cultures	Pablo Groux	MSM	Jrnl.	8 February 2009	23 January 2010	349	
Minister of Cultures	Zulma Yugar	MAS	Mus.	23 January 2010	15 February 2011	388	
Minister of Cultures	Elizabeth Salguero	MAS	Jrnl.	15 February 2011	23 January 2012	342	
Minister of Cultures	Pablo Groux	MSM	Jrnl.	23 January 2012	25 September 2012	1,123	
Minister of Cultures and Tourism	Pablo Groux	MSM	Jrnl.	25 September 2012	19 February 2015	1,123	
Minister of Cultures and Tourism	Marko Marcelo Machicao	MAS	Eco.	19 February 2015	23 January 2017	704	
Minister of Cultures and Tourism	Wilma Alanoca	MAS	Jrnl.	23 January 2017	10 November 2019	1,021	
Minister of Communications	Iván Canelas	MAS	Uni.	15 February 2011	23 January 2012	342	
Minister of Communications	Amanda Dávila	MAS	Jrnl.	23 January 2012	23 January 2015	1,096	
Minister of Communications	Marianela Paco	MAS	Law.	23 January 2015	23 January 2017	731	
Minister of Communications	Gísela López	MAS	Jrnl.	23 January 2017	23 January 2019	730	
Minister of Communications	Manuel Canelas	MAS	Jrnl.	23 January 2019	10 November 2019	291	
Minister of Sports	Office vacant 22 January 2014 – 23 January 2014					1	
Minister of Sports	Tito Montaño	MAS	Ftbl.	23 January 2014	10 November 2019	2,117	

== History ==
=== Cabinets ===
N°	Formed	Days	Decree
I	23 January 2006	365	Presidential Decree N° 28602
II	23 January 2007	365	Presidential Decree N° 29015
III	23 January 2008	382	Presidential Decree N° 29426
IV	8 February 2009	349	Presidential Decree N° 0001
V	23 January 2010	365	Presidential Decree N° 0407
VI	23 January 2011	365	Presidential Decree N° 0775
VII	23 January 2012	731	Presidential Decree N° 1125
VIII	23 January 2014	365	Presidential Decree N° 1869
IX	23 January 2015	731	Presidential Decree N° 2249
X	23 January 2017	730	Presidential Decree N° 3059
XI	23 January 2019	291	Presidential Decree N° 3780

=== Structural changes ===
Portfolio	Part of	Transferred to	Date	Decree
Autonomies	None	Ministry of Autonomies	7 February 2009	Supreme Decree N° 29894
Cultures	Ministry of Education and Cultures	Ministry of Cultures	7 February 2009	Supreme Decree N° 29894
Defense	Ministry of National Defense	Ministry of Defense	7 February 2009	Supreme Decree N° 29894
Finance	Ministry of Finance	Ministry of Economy and Public Finance	7 February 2009	Supreme Decree N° 29894
Production	Ministry of Production and Microenterprises	Ministry of Productive Development	7 February 2009	Supreme Decree N° 29894
Transparency	None	Ministry of Institutional Transparency	7 February 2009	Supreme Decree N° 29894
Communications	None	Ministry of Communications	15 February 2011	Supreme Decree N° 0793
Tourism	Ministry of Cultures	Ministry of Cultures and Tourism	25 September 2012	Law N° 0292
Sports	Ministry of Health and Sports	Ministry of Sports	22 January 2014	Supreme Decree N° 1868
Autonomies	Ministry of Autonomies	Ministry of the Presidency	22 January 2017	Supreme Decree N° 3058
Energies	Ministry of Hydrocarbons and Energies	Ministry of Energies	22 January 2017	Supreme Decree N° 3058
Transparency	Ministry of Institutional Transparency	Ministry of Justice	22 January 2017	Supreme Decree N° 3058
