= Ramos =

Ramos is a surname of Spanish and Portuguese origin that means "bouquets" or "branches". People with the surname Ramos are most commonly found in Mexico, Brazil or Puerto Rico.

Notable people and characters with the surname include:

== People ==
- Adrián Ramos (born 1986), Colombian footballer
- Alejandra Ramos (footballer) (born 1996), American footballer who played for the Peru women's national team
- Alejandra Ramos (runner) (born 1958), Chilean middle distance runner
- Alessandra Ramos Makkeda (1981–2022), Brazilian human rights activist
- Alex Ramos (born 1961), American boxer
- Anthony Ramos (disambiguation), several people
- Antonio J. Ramos (born 1947), Puerto Rican United States Air Force officer
- Ariel Ramos (born 1971), Cuban wrestler
- Aser Ramos (born 1991), Brazilian para-athlete
- Aurelia Ramos de Segarra (1860–1927), Uruguayan philanthropist
- Bartolomeo Ramos (c. 1440–1522), Spanish mathematician, music theorist, and composer
- Benito Ramos (fencer) (1913–?), Mexican fencer
- Benito Ramos (born 1978), Bolivian politician
- Benjamin Ramos (born 1956), Puerto Rican politician
- Bill Ramos (1956–2025), American politician in the Washington State Senate
- Bryan Ramos (born 2002), Cuban baseball player
- Cássio Ramos (born 1987), Brazilian football goalkeeper
- Cenida Ramos (died 2014), Belizean murder victim
- Cesar Ramos (disambiguation), multiple people
- Chris Ramos (born 1997), Spanish footballer
- Christian Ramos (born 1988), Peruvian footballer
- Chucho Ramos (1918–1977), Venezuelan baseball player
- Cindy Ramos-Davidson (1955 - 2025), business advocate from the United States
- Cláudio Ramos (born 1991), Portuguese football goalkeeper
- Dan Ramos (1981–2023), American politician
- Daniel Ramos (footballer) (born 1970), Portuguese football manager and player
- Daniel Ramos (graffiti artist) (born 1972), American graffiti artist
- Davi Ramos (born 1986), Brazilian mixed martial artist
- Diego Ramos (born 1972), Argentine actor
- Eduardo Ramos (racing driver) (born 1966), Argentine racing driver
- Eliana Ramos (1988–2007), Uruguayan model
- Élodie Ramos (born 1983), French footballer
- Fanny Ramos (born 1995), French kickboxer
- Fidel V. Ramos (1928-2022), Filipino politician and soldier, 12th President of the Philippines
- Gonçalo Ramos (born 2001), Portuguese footballer
- Graciliano Ramos (1892–1953), Brazilian writer, politician and journalist
- Heliot Ramos (born 1999), Puerto Rican baseball player
- Henry Ramos (disambiguation), multiple people
- Humberto Ramos (born 1970), Mexican comic book artist
- Humberto Ramos (footballer) (born 1949), Brazilian footballer and manager
- Ignacio Ramos (born 1969), US border patrol agent
- Ildefonso Ramos Mexía (1769–1854), Argentine statesman
- Ivone Ramos (1926–2018), Cape Verdean writer
- Jessica Ramos (born 1985), American politician
- Jesús "Aguaje" Ramos (born 1951), Cuban trombonist
- Jordávio Ramos (born 1993), Brazilian politician
- Jorge Ramos (news anchor) (born 1958), Mexican journalist and author
- Jorge L. Ramos (born 1950), Puerto Rican Telemundo news anchor
- José Antonio Ramos Sucre (1890–1930), Venezuelan poet, professor, diplomat and scholar
- José Luis Ramos (1790–1849), Venezuelan writer and politician
- José María Ramos Mejía (1849–1914), Argentine politician and historian
- Juande Ramos (born 1954), Spanish footballer and manager
- Julia Ramos (born 1963), Bolivian nurse and politician
- Julio Ramos (1935–2006), Argentine journalist and businessman
- Khalil Ramos (born 1996), Filipino actor and singer
- Kid Ramos (born 1959), American electric blues and blues rock guitarist, singer and songwriter
- Lázaro Ramos (born 1978), Brazilian actor, television presenter, director, writer, and voice actor
- Leonardo Ramos (footballer, born 1989), Argentine striker
- Luis Antonio Ramos (born 1973), Puerto Rican-American actor
- Luis Rosendo Ramos (born 1957), Mexican road bicycle racer
- Luisel Ramos (1984–2006), Uruguayan model
- Marcelo Ramos (born 1973), Brazilian footballer
- Marcelo Ramos (born 1972), Uruguayan footballer
- María Cristina Ramos (writer) (born 1952), Argentine writer and educator
- Mario Ramos (born 1973), Spanish actor
- Mario Ramos (born 1977), American Baseball pitcher
- Martín Ramos (born 1991), Argentine volleyball player
- Mel Ramos (1935–2018), American figurative painter
- Mike Ramos (decathlete) (born 1962), American decathlete
- Nathalia Ramos (born 1992), Spanish actress and singer
- Olga Ramos (Trinidad Olga Ramos Sanguino, 1918–2005), Spanish cupletista, violinist, and actress
- Olga Ramos (activist) (1962–2022), Venezuelan activist, professor and researcher
- Ozzie Ramos (born 1996), American soccer player
- Patricio Peralta Ramos (1814–1887), Argentine businessman and landowner
- Pedro Senatore Ramos (born 1968), Ecuadorian football (soccer) referee
- Pedro Ramos (born 1935), Cuban baseball player
- Rafael Ramos (disambiguation), several people
- Reggie Ramos, Philippine-American public transportation advocate and lawyer
- Rico Ramos (born 1987), American boxer
- Rhian Ramos (born 1990), Filipino actress
- Ruben Ramos (disambiguation), several people
- Ruy Ramos (born 1957), Brazilian-Japanese football (soccer) player
- Santiago Ramos (actor) (born 1949), Spanish actor
- Santiago Ramos (racing driver) (born 2004), Mexican racing driver
- Santiago Ramos Mingo (born 2001), Argentine footballer
- Sarah Ramos (born 1991), American actress
- Sergio Ramos (born 1986), Spanish footballer
- Sérgio Ramos (basketball) (born 1975), Portuguese basketball coach and former player
- Sergio Ramos (water polo) (born 1941), Mexican water polo player
- Tab Ramos (born 1966), American soccer player, born in Uruguay
- Tania Ramos González (born 1971), Puerto Rican author and academic
- Teodoro Ramos Blanco (1902–1972), Afro-Cuban sculptor, educator
- Thomas Ramos (rugby union) (born 1995), French international rugby union player
- Thomas Vincent Ramos (1887–1955), Belizean civil rights activist
- Tony Ramos, Brazilian actor
- Verónica Ramos, Bolivian economist, professor, and politician
- Víctor Alberto Ramos (born 1945), Argentine geologist
- Víctor Ramos (footballer, born 1958), Argentine striker
- Wendell Ramos (born 1978), Filipino actor
- Will Ramos (born 1993 or 1994), American vocalist
- Wilson Ramos (born 1987), Venezuelan baseball player

== Fictional characters ==
- Nick Ramos, protagonist from the 2013 video game Dead Rising 3
- Ramos, a fourth gym leader of Kalos from the 2013 video game Pokémon X and Y
- Deputy Arcadio Kayo Ramos, main character in Lone Wolf McQuade
