= Presidency of Evo Morales =

President of Bolivia, 2006–2019

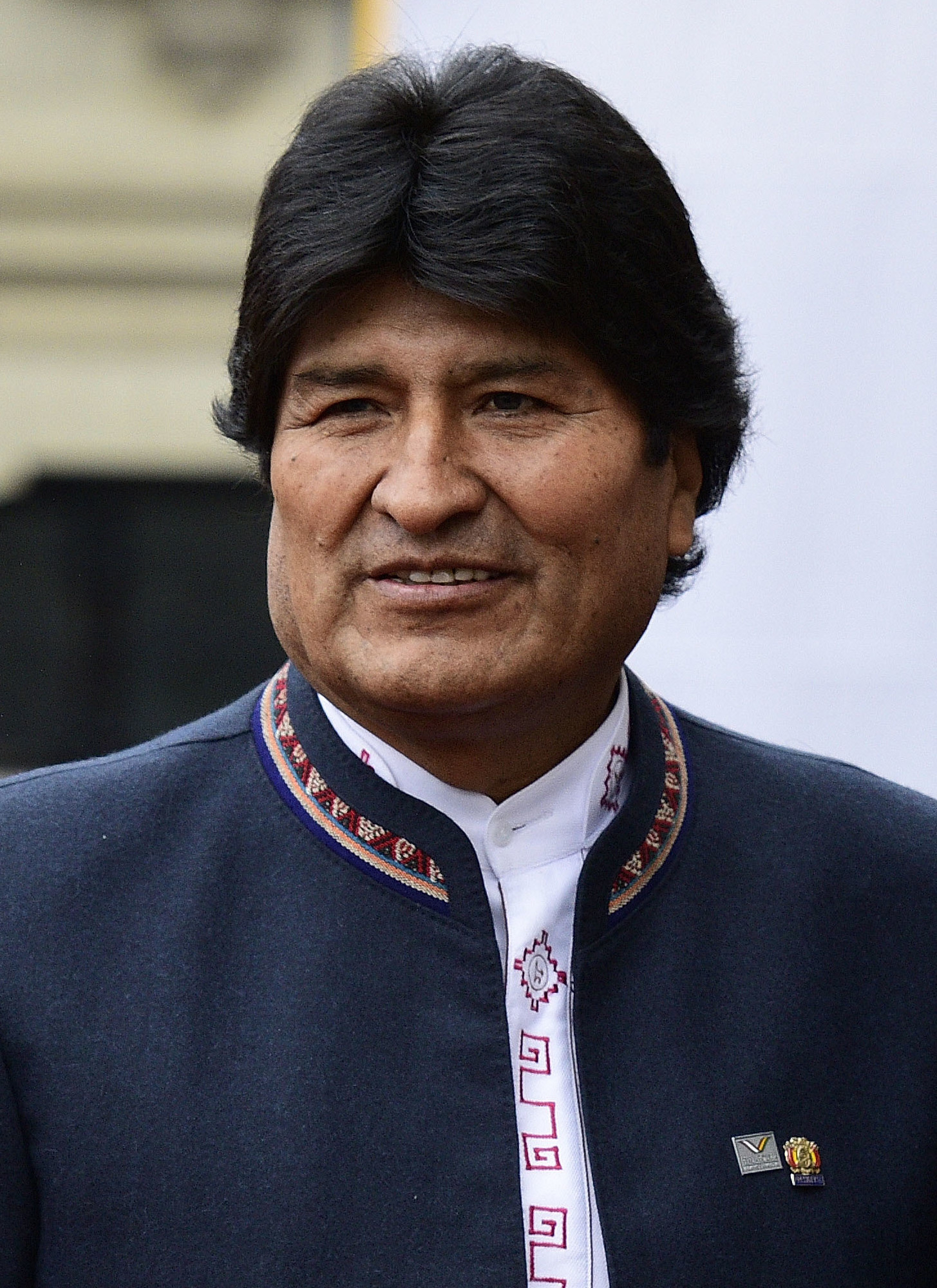
- Presidency of Evo Morales; January 22, 2006 – November 10, 2019
- Vice President: Álvaro García Linera
- Cabinet: see list
- Party: MAS-IPSP
- Election: 2005; 2009; 2014; 2019 (disputed)
- Seat: Palacio Quemado, La Paz

The Presidency of Evo Morales began on January 22, 2006, when Evo Morales was inaugurated as the 65th President of Bolivia, following his victory in the 2005 general election, where he won 53.7% of the vote, defeating Jorge Quiroga (second with 28.6%), Samuel Doria Medina (third with 7.8%), and several other candidates. Morales increased taxation on the hydrocarbon industry to bolster social spending, emphasising projects to combat illiteracy, poverty, racism, and sexism. Vocally criticizing neoliberalism and reducing Bolivia's dependence on the World Bank and International Monetary Fund, his administration oversaw strong economic growth while following a policy termed "Evonomics" which sought to move from a liberal economic approach to a mixed economy. Scaling back U.S. influence in the country, he built relationships with leftist governments in the Latin American pink tide and signed Bolivia into the Bolivarian Alliance for the Americas. Attempting to moderate the left-indigenous activist community, his administration also opposed the right-wing autonomist demands of Bolivia's eastern provinces. Winning a recall referendum in 2008, he instituted a new constitution that established Bolivia as a plurinational state and was re-elected in 2009. His second term witnessed the continuation of leftist policies and Bolivia's joining of the Bank of the South and Community of Latin American and Caribbean States; he was again reelected in the 2014 general election. Following the disputed 2019 general election and the ensuing unrest, Morales resigned and flew to Mexico where he had been granted political asylum.

== 2006 ==
A constituent assembly was convened in 2006, which produced a final text of a new Constitution of Bolivia in December 2007. It was approved in the Bolivian constitutional referendum, 2009.

== 2007 ==
=== Conflict with Reyes Villa ===
Among Morales's most outspoken political opponents is Cochabamba Governor Manfred Reyes Villa. In early 2007 his opposition to Morales' policies inspired a number of the President's supporters to take to the streets and demand his resignation. As the group interacted with police and Reyes Villa's supporters events escalated into violence, leaving two dead and 100 injured before calm could be restored.

=== Ponchos Rojos ===
On January 23, 2007, Morales and Bolivian military chiefs attended an indigenous peoples rally of the "Red Ponchos" (Ponchos Rojos) who support him in the Andean region of Omasuyos. At the rally Morales thanked the group, saying "I urge our Armed Forces along with the ‘Ponchos Rojos’ to defend our unity and our territorial integrity." Because the group is seen as armed and militant by Morales's opposition they accused him and the Armed Forces of supporting "illegal militias." The rally was held in Achacachi which during the 1970s was the center of the leftist guerrilla movement EGTK (Tupac Katari Guerrilla Army) which had Morales' vice president Álvaro García Linera in their membership. To the cheers of the crowd Morales chastised those calling for regional autonomy saying, "No caballero [a term for white colonizers] will be able to split apart Bolivia."

=== Advisor faces terrorism charges in Peru ===
Walter Chávez resigned on February 1, 2007, after being indicted for acts of terrorism in his native country of Peru, which seeks his extradition. Chavez fled Peru following the 1992 coup by Alberto Fujimori, to Bolivia. There, he sought and gained refugee status after presenting his case to the Bolivian government and the United Nations. For 15 years, Chavez made a name for himself in public life as a journalist for multiple newspapers, including La Razon—perhaps Bolivia's most important daily newspaper.

Chávez was hired by the Morales’ Presidential campaign and continued on as media advisor for the Presidency once Morales took office. Peruvian authorities accuse him of "having been a member of the Túpac Amaru Revolutionary Movement guerrilla group that carried out bombings and kidnappings in the 1980s and 1990s." The specific charges against Chávez is that he was "a MRTA member who extorted two Peruvian businessmen on behalf of the group in 1990. …[that same year] Chávez was arrested after receiving $10,000 from one of the men, was released on bail a month later and in 1992 fled to Bolivia." He is also accused "of receiving $5,000 in another case." Chávez has repeatedly denied the charges, saying "They accused me of being part of an MRTA cell but they never proved anything against me."

The resignation came as the Bolivian Senate (which is led by an alliance of opposition parties) announced its intention to rapidly investigate the extent of "Chávez's duties and how he obtained residency in the country." Peruvian television, Bolivian newspapers and the Miami Herald were also pursuing the story with ever more vigor, in the days leading to Chávez leaving the Morales government. He explained his resignation to the Miami Herald, saying that "A lot of things have been said that weren't true. This is beginning to hurt the government." In 2006, Peru had quietly asked for the extradition of Chávez but was turned down as he had been granted political asylum by the Bolivian government. Peru announced that it would be re-filing its extradition request. Chávez said he has no plans to defend himself in court by going to Peru.

=== Miners protest ===
In early February 2007, parts of the Bolivian region of La Paz were brought to a standstill as 20,000 miners took to the roads and streets to protest a tax hike to the Complementary Mining Tax (ICM) by the Morales government. The protesting miners threw dynamite and clashed with those passing by. The Morales government had attempted to head-off the demonstration by announcing on February 5, 2007, that the tax increase was not directed at the 50,000 miners who are co-op members but at larger private mining companies. This did not dissuade the thousands of protestors who had already gathered nearby the capital in the less affluent city of El Alto.

== 2008 ==
=== Movements for regional autonomy ===
Morales's economic policies have generated opposition from some departments, including Santa Cruz, which have oil and agricultural resources. Political parties that oppose Morales, along with pro-market groups disrupted the workings of Bolivia's Constitutional Assembly by disputing voting mechanisms within the assembly and then by introducing a divisive debate about which city should be Bolivia's capital. Four of the country's nine governors are also demanding more autonomy from the central government and a larger share of government revenues.

The four are the governors of Santa Cruz, Chuquisaca, Beni, and Tarija. The remaining five governors are part of Morales's Movimiento al Socialismo party. They are among the first generation of popularly (directly) elected governors. Before December 2005, all governors were political appointees of the President.

The call for autonomy comes mainly from the wealthy lowland regions of Bolivia, which are centers of opposition against Morales. It has been alleged that the autonomy question "has relatively little to do with language, culture, [and] religion… it is mostly about money and resources — specifically, who controls Bolivia's valuable natural gas reserves, second largest in South America after Venezuela's." There are also racial overtones to the autonomy movement, quasi-fascist groups such as the Nación Camba and the Unión Juvenil Cruceñista use violence and intimidation tactics against indigenous groups, using autonomy as a tool to subvert the elected government. The UN Special Rapporteur on the Human Rights of Indigenous Peoples, Rodolfo Stavenhagen, also published a report on the situation in Santa Cruz following a visit in December 2007 and observed that the political climate had given rise to ‘manifestations of racism more suited to a colonial society than a modern democratic state’.

Morales sees some of the calls for autonomy as an attempt to disintegrate Bolivia and has vowed to fight them. He has "repeatedly charged that rich landowners and businesspeople from the eastern city of Santa Cruz, an anti-Morales stronghold, were fomenting and funding the autonomy movement in a bid to grab national resources."

=== Autonomy referendums ===
Four departments, Santa Cruz, Tarija, Beni and Pando, announced in December 2007, shortly after the proposal of a new Bolivian constitution, that they would seek more autonomy and self-government. Santa Cruz and Beni called referendums on autonomy which were held on May 4, 2008, and June 1, 2008, respectively. However, the autonomy statutes which they have proposed have been declared illegal and unconstitutional by the National Electoral Court of Bolivia.

On May 4, 2008, authorities in Santa Cruz held a local referendum on the autonomy statutes that had been presented in December 2007. The scheduled referendum vote was struck down by Bolivia's National Electoral Court and no international observers were present, as both the Organization of American States and the European Union declined to send observers. There was a high rate of abstention from the referendum and some polling booths were blocked and ballot boxes destroyed. Protests were somewhat pronounced in areas of major immigration from the western highlands, like Yapacani and San Julián, as well as in areas under indigenous control. In Guaraní territory, ballot boxes were burned in a rejection of the legitimacy of the vote. There were also allegations of fraud and ballot box interference. Reports allege that ballot boxes were delivered already containing pre-marked ballot papers on which crosses had been placed next to the YES option. A number of the protesters accused Santa Cruz leaders of trying to secede from Bolivia and expressed support for a draft constitution written by Bolivia's Constituent Assembly that grants several different levels of autonomy including departmental and indigenous autonomy. Despite this, results showed 85% approval for the autonomy statute, though abstention was recorded at 39%. The Santa Cruz autonomy movement conflicts with the constitutional reform proposed by Evo Morales, who seeks to create, as Morales and his supporters perceive it, a fairer state which includes full rights and recognition of the previously marginalized indigenous majority.

The results thrilled leaders in the eastern Bolivian province of Santa Cruz, who had defied the order of the National Electoral Court, the Congress and President Evo Morales by putting the statute up for a vote. The statute would give the department additional powers such as the right to form its own police, set tax and land-use policies and elect a governor.

On May 8, the National Congress passed a law establishing a recall election for the mandates of the President, Vice President and eight of the nine departmental Prefects (six of whom were sympathetic to the opposition). President Evo Morales supported this initiative.

The elements of the autonomy movement came to the fore in the city of Sucre on May 24, 2008. Peasants from settlements outside Sucre came to the centre of the city to participate in a ceremony with President Morales. Instead they were accosted by an aggressive group of young people and marched to Sucre's central square. There they were made to strip to the waist and burn their ponchos, the flag of the MAS party and the wiphala (the flag of the Aymara). While they were doing this they were forced to shout anti-government slogans and were physically assaulted. Present in the square at the time were Jorge "Tuto" Quiroga, former president and leader of the opposition party Podemos, opposition Senator Óscar Ortiz and Prefect of Cochabamba, Manfred Reyes Villa. After these events the government declared it to be a "day of national shame".

=== Recall Referendum ===
On August 10, 2008, a recall referendum was held in Bolivia on the mandates of President Evo Morales, his Vice-president Alvaro Garcia Linera and eight of the nine regional prefects. Evo Morales won the referendum with a resounding 67% 'yes' vote, and he and Garcia Linera were ratified in post. Two of the prefects, both aligned with the political opposition in the country, failed to gain enough support and had their mandates recalled with new prefects to be elected in their place. The elections were monitored by over 400 observers, including election observers from the Organization of American States, European Parliament and Mercosur.

=== Autonomy policy ===
Evo Morales and the MAS government subsequently adopted autonomy as a government policy and departmental autonomies were recognised in the new Bolivian constitution, approved in a referendum in January 2009. As well as departmental autonomy, the new constitution recognises municipal, provincial and indigenous autonomies.

== 2009 ==
=== 2009 election ===
Following the approval of the new Constitution of Bolivia in the January 2009 referendum, new elections were called. Morales won the 2009 general election with a landslide majority, polling 64%. His party, Movement for Socialism, also won a two-thirds majority in both the Chamber of Deputies and the Senate.

=== Alleged Assassination attempt ===
On April 16, 2009, Bolivian police killed three men and arrested two others in what was called an assassination plot against Morales. The three men were all foreigners: Eduardo Rózsa-Flores, from Hungary; Michael Dwyer, from Ireland; and Árpád Magyarosi, from Romania. Police said the men discussed bombing a boat on Lake Titicaca where Morales and his cabinet had been meeting on 3 April 2009.

== 2010 ==
=== Cabinet ===
Unless otherwise specified, Ministerial transitions occurred during annual appointments in January: on 23 January in 2010, 2011, and 2012.

Cabinet of Bolivia Second Presidency of Evo Morales, 2010–2015
Office	Name	Term
Presidency	Evo Morales	2006–present
Vice Presidency	Álvaro García Linera	2006–present
Ministry of the Presidency	Juan Ramón Quintana	2012–present
Ministry of the Presidency	Carlos Romero Bonifaz	14 Jun 2011–2012
Ministry of the Presidency	Oscar Coca Antezana	2010–14 Jun 2011
Ministry of Foreign Affairs (Chancellor)	David Choquehuanca	2006–present
Ministry of Government	Carlos Romero Bonifaz	2012–present
Ministry of Government	Wilfredo Chávez	28 Sep 2011–2012
Ministry of Government	Sacha Sergio Llorenti Soliz	2010–27 Sep 2011
Ministry of National Defense	Rubén Saavedra Soto	27 Sep 2011–
Ministry of National Defense	María Cecilia Chacón Rendón	6 Apr–26 Sep 2011
Ministry of National Defense	Rubén Saavedra Soto	2010—6 Apr 2011
Solicitor General's Office	Hugo Raúl Montero Lara	8 Feb 2011–present
replaced Ministry of Legal Defense of the State	Arismendi Chumacero	2010—8 Feb 2011
Ministry of Cultures	Pablo Groux	2012–present
Ministry of Cultures	Elizabeth Salguero	16 Feb 2011–2012
Ministry of Cultures	Zulma Yugar Párraga	2010—16 Feb 2011
Ministry of Development Planning	Elba Viviana Caro Hinojosa	2010–present
Ministry of Autonomy	Claudia Peña	14 Jun 2011–present
Ministry of Autonomy	Carlos Romero Bonifaz	Feb 2009–14 Jun 2011
Ministry of Education	Roberto Aguilar Gómez	2008–present
Ministry of Rural Development and Land	Nemecia Achacollo Tola	2010–2015
Ministry of Economy and Finance	Luis Alberto Arce Catacora	2006–present
Ministry of Public Works, Services, and Housing	Vladimir Sánchez Escobar	2012–present
Ministry of Public Works, Services, and Housing	Walter Juvenal Delgadillo Terceros	–2012
Ministry of Mining and Metallurgy	Mario Virreira Iporre	2012–present
Ministry of Mining and Metallurgy	José Antonio Pimentel Castillo	29 Jan 2010–2012
Ministry of Mining and Metallurgy	Milton Gómez Mamani	23–29 Jan 2010
Ministry of Justice	Cecilia Ayllón Quinteros	2012–present
Ministry of Justice	Nilda Copa Condori	2010–2012
Ministry of Health and Sports	Juan Carlos Calvimontes Camargo	2012–present
Ministry of Health and Sports	Nila Heredia Miranda	May 2010 – 2012
Ministry of Health and Sports	Sonia Polo	Jan 2010–May 2010
Ministry of Work, Employment, and Social Security	Daniel Santalla	2 Jun 2011–present
Ministry of Work, Employment, and Social Security	Félix Rojas Gutiérrez	Feb–2 Jun 2011
Ministry of Work, Employment, and Social Security	Carmen Trujillo Cárdenas	2010–16 Feb 2011
Ministry of Institutional Transparency and the Fight against Corruption	Nardi Suxo	2009–present
Ministry of Hydrocarbons and Energy	Juan José Sosa Soruco	2012–present
Ministry of Hydrocarbons and Energy	José Luis Gutiérrez Pérez	2011–2012
Ministry of Hydrocarbons and Energy	Luis Fernando Vincenti	February 2010 – 2011
Ministry of the Environment and Water	Felipe Quispe Quenta	2012–present
Ministry of the Environment and Water	Julieta Monje Villa	2011–2012
Ministry of the Environment and Water	María Esther Udaeta	2010–2011
Ministry of Productive Development and the Plural Economy	Ana Teresa Morales	2011–present
Ministry of Productive Development and the Plural Economy	Antonia Rodriguez	2010–2011
Ministry of Communication created 16 February 2011	Amanda Dávila Torrez	2012–present
Ministry of Communication created 16 February 2011	Iván Canelas	Feb 2011–2012

The cabinet of Morales' second administration was appointed on 23 January 2010. In a gesture of gender equity, it consists of ten men and ten women, seven of whom continued their previous service.

=== Constitutional transition ===
Morales' second inauguration, on 22 January 2010, marked the beginning of the new Plurinational State of Bolivia, as defined by the 2009 Constitution. The Constitution also required a set of five structural laws, with a deadline of 180 days following 22 January for these laws to be passed. These laws, which made up the bulk of the early 2010 legislative activity, are:

1. The Electoral Organs Law
2. The Judicial Organs Law
3. The Framework Law on Autonomies
4. The Electoral Regime Law
5. The Constitutional Court Law

=== Climate change ===
Bolivia's negotiating team, led by Pablo Solón, was a leading critic of the United States-sponsored Copenhagen Accord in the 2009 UNFCCC negotiations in Copenhagen, Denmark. Shortly thereafter, the Bolivian government issued a call for a World People's Conference on Climate Change and the Rights of Mother Earth, to be held in April 2010. The five-day summit, held in Tiquipaya on the outskirts of Cochabamba, issued its own People's Agreement as an agenda for international response to climate change. The Bolivian delegation to global climate talks worked to have this document and its demands included in international negotiations, but was isolated in its formal opposition to the conclusions of December Cancún climate summit.

=== Potosí Civic Strike ===
In July and August, citizens in Potosí department—led by the Potosí Civic Committee or Comcipo—engaged in an escalating series of strike actions in support of a six-point agenda of demands of the national government. Actions included a 24-hour closure of business on July 19, a two-day general strike began on July 29 and extended into nineteen days of closures of roads and businesses, hunger strikes by hundreds of people including the department's governor and several of its legislators, and closure of the department's airport. Los Tiempos called the protests "the most prolonged and overwhelming" that the Morales government has faced so far. Among the demands were resolution of a conflict with Oruro Department over the limestone rich Pahua hill, activation of the Karachipampa smelting plant, upgrading of Potosí's airport to international airport status, implementation of road construction projects, and preservation of Potosí's Cerro Rico. Negotiations with the national government were held in Sucre, leading to an agreement on August 15. On August 16, Potosino negotiators returned to the city amid widespread celebrations and a Day of Potosí Unity was declared. Morales administration officials charged the Potosí movement with carrying forward a "false conflict" around issues it was always willing to support.

=== Gasolinazo ===
Bolivia faced national protests after the announcement of a Supreme Decree 748 to cut government subsidies for gasoline and diesel fuels, increasing the prices of those commodities on December 28, 2010. The measures triggered widespread protests throughout the country, among groups including Morales's own political base. Following the protests, on 31 December 2010, Morales announced that the supreme decree would be annulled, saying that he was complying with his promise to "listen to the people". The protest measures were subsequently called off. Whereas Morales enjoyed consistently high approval ratings in his first term, the "Gasolinazo" was a contributory factor to a sharp decline in approval.

== 2011 ==
=== Price crisis ===
In the wake of the December gasolinazo, rising world food prices, and local supply disruptions (particularly around sugar), prices rose sharply in early 2011. Organizations of public transit drivers and milk producers demanded higher prices for their goods, while workers went on strike for higher wages. In early March, the government issued a Supreme Decree raising wages by 10% and the minimum wage by 20% to 815.40 Bolivianos per month, but the move failed to stop protests and strikes by the Central Obrera Boliviana labor confederation.

=== Sanabria drug trafficking scandal ===
A senior policymaker on narcotics policing, retired General René Sanabria, was arrested on February 24 in Panama and extradited to the United States to face narcotrafficking charges. Sanabria had been the head of the Center of Intelligence and Information Generation (Spanish: Centro de Inteligencia y Generación de Información, Cegein) and was the director of the Special Force in Fighting Drug Traffic (Spanish: Fuerza Especial de Lucha Contra el Narcotráfico, Felcn) in 2007 and 2008. As of 2 March 2011, four more of the fifteen counternarcotics officials in Cegein were arrested by Bolivian authorities, while the remaining 10 were under investigation. In the wake of the affair, Evo Morales named Colonel Ciro Farfán as new general commander of the National Police, giving him ninety days to eliminate corruption in the force. However, Farfán himself was relieved of duty on May 19 due to his involvement in a fraudulent license plate ring at the Directorate for the Prevention of Vehicle Theft (Diprove). Morales named General Jorge Renato Santiesteban Claure to replace him.

=== Labor mobilization ===
The Bolivian Workers' Center (COB) coordinated a 12-day general strike in April 2011. The strike covered four sectors—teachers, health workers, some miners, and La Paz municipal employees—but striker's blockades paralyzed much of the country's economic life. The strike was resolved on April 18 with a minimal addition to the government's proposed 10% nominal wage increase and a 12-point package of agreements.

=== Indigenous protests ===
In July 2011, following the beginning of construction on the Villa Tunari across the Isiboro (TIPNIS), the Subcentral TIPNIS (the representative institution of indigenous residents in the territory), the Confederation of Indigenous Peoples of Bolivia, and the highland indigenous confederation CONAMAQ announced they would participate in a national march opposing the project. This march—the "Eighth Grand National Indigenous March"—travelled from Trinidad, Beni to La Paz in opposition to the project, beginning on August 15, 2011. On September 25, a police raid on the march resulted in the detention of hundreds of marchers, who were later released. The march regrouped and arrived in La Paz on October 19 to a massive public welcome. During the march, other movements such as the Cochabamba campesino confederation and the colonos union in Yucumo mobilized in favor of the project. In early October, the Plurinational Legislative Assembly passed legislation authored by the MAS authorizing the road following a consultation process, but indigenous deputies and the indigenous movement opposed the bill. At the opening of negotiations with the protesters on October 21, Morales announced that he would veto the legislation and support the text proposed by the indigenous deputies. This text was passed by the Assembly and signed into law on October 24, effectively ending the conflict. Law 180 of 2011 declares TIPNIS an intangible zone and prohibits the construction of highways that cross it.

=== Plurinational Encuentro ===
Beginning in early 2011, the Morales government insisted that any new moves on the fuel subsidy issue raised in the gasolinazo would be agreed on by multiple sectors of society in a summit. Following the TIPNIS controversy and various calls from supporters to "re-drive the process of change," the government organized a broader Plurinational Encuentro to Deepen the Process of Change (Spanish: Encuentro Plurinacional para Profundizar el Proceso de Cambio), charged with setting the government's agenda for 2012. The Encuentro consists of three parts: opening and closing general meetings bracket a period of consultation with the broader membership of participating organizations. The opening encounter united multiple sectoral organizations, the President, Vice President, Cabinet Ministers, legislators, MAS-IPSP governors, and other officials at the Casa Campestre on the west side of the city of Cochabamba on 12–14 December 2011. Some 650 delegates organized themselves into 10 thematic tables which produced an agenda including no fewer than 51 new laws. Indigenous confederations CIDOB and CONAMAQ declined to attend organized an alternate assembly in Santa Cruz. The COB labor Federation also avoided the meeting and met separately to propose a national agenda.

The closing meetings were held 9–12 January 2012.

== 2012 ==
=== Nationalization of electrical grid ===
On 1 May 2012, the Bolivian government announced its plans to nationalise Red Eléctrica's subsidiary in the country, Transportadora de Electricidad (TDE). The electric grid covers 74% of Bolivia's total grid, or 2,772 kilometres of transmission lines; the rest is controlled by smaller companies in the eastern lowlands which are not attached to the national grid. President Evo Morales said though Red Eléctrica would be compensated, it had invested US$81 million since the grid's privatisation in 1997 and the government had "invested $220m in generation and others profited. For that reason, brothers and sisters, we have decided to nationalise electricity transmission. Just to make it clear to national and international public opinion, we are nationalising a company that previously was ours." The Spanish Ambassador Ramon Santos said that the move was "sending a negative message that generates distrust." Following the measure, soldiers took over the corporate headquarters in Cochabamba peacefully and raised Bolivian flags. It also follows the partial nationalisation of the electric grid in 2010, including hydroelectric plants.

Between 2006 and 2014, GDP per capita doubled and the extreme poverty rate declined from 38 to 18%. Moreover, the Gini coefficient (a measure of statistical dispersion intended to represent the income or wealth distribution of a nation's residents) declined from 0.60 to 0.47.
