= Ana Teresa Morales =

Bolivian economist

Ana Teresa Morales Olivera
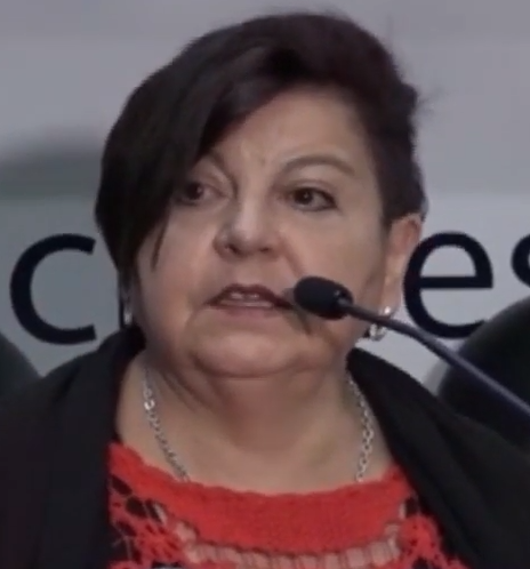

Minister of Productive Development and Plural Economy of Bolivia
- In office 23 January 2011 – 23 January 2015
- President: Evo Morales
- Preceded by: Antonia Rodríguez
- Succeeded by: Ana Verónica Ramos Morales

Personal details
- Born: La Paz, Bolivia
- Parent: Manuel Morales Dávila (father)
- Education: Higher University of San Andrés
- Occupation: Economist, professor, politician

Ana Teresa Morales Olivera (La Paz, 26 October 1959) is a Bolivian economist, professor, and politician. She was the Minister of Productive Development and Plural Economy of Bolivia from 23 January 2011, to 23 January 2015, during the second government of President Evo Morales Ayma.

== Biography ==
Ana Teresa Morales was born on 26 October 1959, in the city of La Paz. She is the daughter of the renowned Potosí lawyer Manuel Morales Dávila. Teresa studied economics at the Higher University of San Andrés, graduating as an economist by profession in 1983. She has a doctorate in developmental sciences from CIDES – UMSA, and a master's degree in human development.

During her career, she worked as a professor and was a consultant to various institutions on issues of productive promotion, urban poverty, and rural-urban micro-enterprises.

She has also been coordinator of the Legal Unit for Constitutional Development in the Plurinational Legislative Assembly, advisor to the bench of the Movement to Socialism (MAS) in the 2008 constituent assembly, advisor to Minister Carlos Romero Bonifaz on the issue of rural development, and advisor to the Ministry of Production and Microenterprise.

== Political life ==
=== Vice Minister of Rural and Agricultural Development (2009–2010) ===
On 24 January 2009, the Minister of Rural Development of Bolivia, Julia Ramos Sánchez, installed Teresa Morales in the position of Vice Minister of Rural and Agricultural Development, replacing Remmy Gonzales. She was in office for one year until February 2010 when she was replaced by Víctor Hugo Vásquez.

=== General manager of the San Buenaventura Sugar Company (2010–2011) ===
On 10 November 2010, Bolivian Minister of Productive Development Antonia Rodríguez appointed economist Teresa Morales as the new general manager of the San Buenaventura sugar company. She would only be in that position for two months until January 2011.

=== Minister of Productive Development and Plural Economy (2011–2015) ===
On 23 January 2011, Bolivian President Evo Morales Ayma installed her in the position of Minister of Productive Development and Plural Economy of the country, replacing Antonia Rodríguez. Teresa Morales was in office for a period of 4 years until 23 January 2015, handing over command of the ministry to La Paz economist Verónica Ramos.

=== Director of the Financial Investigations Unit (UIF) (2018–2019) ===
On 19 March 2018, the Minister of Economy and Public Finance Mario Guillén Suárez placed Teresa Morales as the new Director of the Financial Investigations Unit (UIF), replacing Alejandro Taboada. During her tenure, Morales said that one of her challenges is to continue with the investigation of the so-called "Panama Papers."

== See also ==
- Jorge Pérez Valenzuela
- Carlos Romero (Bolivian politician)
- Nardi Suxo
- Rubén Saavedra
- Juan Ramón Quintana
- Nemesia Achacollo
