= Pablo Ramos =

Bolivian economist

Pablo Ramos Sánchez
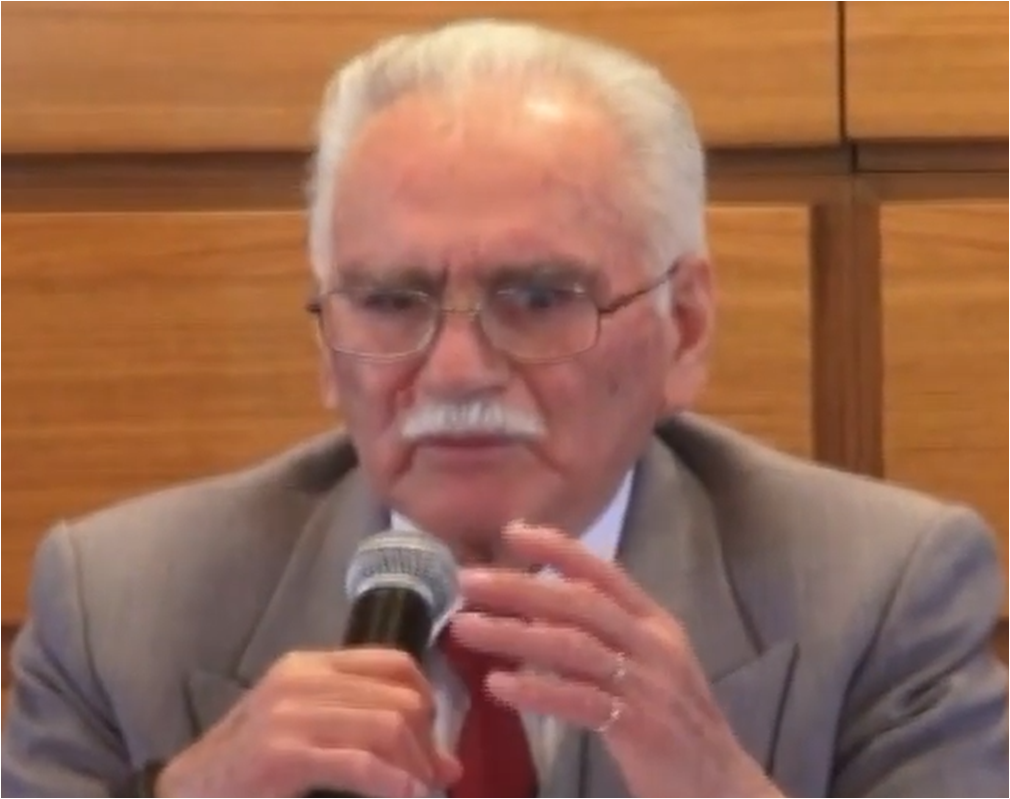
- Pablo Ramos in 2019
- Born: January 25, 1937; Yacuiba, Bolivia
- Died: September 24, 2021 (aged 84); Yacuiba, Bolivia
- Education: Higher University of San Andrés
- Occupations: Economist, writer, rector and university professor
- Known for: Central Bank of Bolivia president (2017-2019)
- Spouse: Mery Ruth Morales Córdova
- Children: 2 including Verónica Ramos

Signature
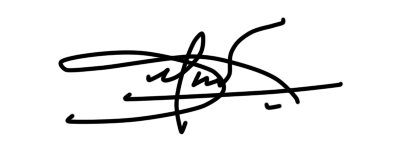

Pablo Ramos Sánchez (Yacuiba, Bolivia; January 25, 1937 - Yacuiba, Bolivia; September 24, 2021) was a Bolivian economist, writer, rector and university professor. He was the last Prefect (interim) of La Paz Department from August 10, 2008 to May 29, 2010 during the first government of President Evo Morales Ayma. He was also the President of the Central Bank of Bolivia from 3 January 2017 to 17 December 2019.

Ramos was the father of the Bolivian economist and former government minister Verónica Ramos.
