= Udaeta =

Udaeta is a surname. Notable people with the surname include:

- José de Udaeta (1919–2009), Spanish dancer
- María Udaeta, Bolivian politician
