= Marcelo Ramos =

Marcelo Ramos may refer to:

- Marcelo Ramos (footballer, born 1972), Uruguayan footballer
- Marcelo Ramos (footballer, born 1973), Brazilian footballer
- Marcelo Ramos (politician) (born 1973), Brazilian politician
