= Hilda Mundy =

Bolivian writer, poet and journalist

Hilda Mundy (pseudonym: Laura Villanueva Rocabado; 1912–1980) was a Bolivian writer, poet, and journalist.

== Biography ==
Laura Villanueva Rocabado was born in Oruro, Bolivia, in 1912, the second of three siblings. She was the daughter of the architect Emilio Villanueva and Dominga Rocabado Flores.

Mundy married Antonio Ávila Jiménez, a poet from Oruro. Her daughter was the poet Silvia Mercedes Ávila.

Mundy wrote for the newspapers La Patria, La Retaguardia, and La Mañana. In the latter, her column, "Brandy Cocktail", was notable in its day. She founded the weekly Dum Dum, which was closed and censored after Mundy was exiled in 1934 by the de facto government of José Luis Tejada Sorzano following an article that criticized the Bolivian military for their defeat in the Chaco War. Mundy's publications were above all critical of her milieu, the economic power of the time, war and militarism. Most of her works and her writings were edited after Mundy's death by her daughter, Silvia, who also edited part of Mundy's work in the book Cosas de Fondo in 1989.

Her articles were included in the newspapers of Oruro and La Paz: Glosas contemporáneas (Diario La Retaguardia), Brandy cocktail (Diario La mañana), Semanario Dum Dum, Corto circuito (Periódico La Patria), Textos varios (El fuego), Vitaminas (El fuego), Revista de Bolivia, Cuadernos literarios del periódico Última Hora, Suplemento dominical de La Nación, Khoya, Dador, and Inéditos.

She lived her last years in Casa del Poeta in the Miraflores neighborhood of La Paz and died in 1980.

== Works ==
The body of her published works include:

- Pirotecnia: ensayo miedoso de literatura ultraista, Artistic Printing, La Paz, 1936. (2nd ed., The World / Plural Butterfly, La Paz, 2004.) (3rd ed., The books of the Broken Woman, Santiago de Chile, 2015.)
- Cosas de fondo: Impresiones de la Guerra del Chaco y otros escritos, Huayna Potosí, La Paz, 1989.
- Obra reunida, edición y estudio introductorio de Rocío Zavala Virreira, Biblioteca del Bicentenario de Bolivia, 2016.
