= Noel Aguirre =

Bolivian politician (1960–2024)

Minister of Development Planning
- In office 8 February 2009 – 23 January 2010
- President: Evo Morales
- Preceded by: Carlos Villegas
- Succeeded by: Viviana Caro Hinojosa

Personal details
- Born: Noel Ricardo Aguirre Ledezma; 26 April 1960 Bolivia
- Died: 2 January 2024 (aged 63) La Paz, Bolivia
- Party: MAS-IPSP
- Occupation: Educator, economist

Noel Ricardo Aguirre Ledezma (26 April 1960 – 2 January 2024) was a Bolivian politician, educator, economist.

A member of the Quechua people, he served as Minister of Development Planning in the Cabinet of Evo Morales from 2009 to 2010. Prior to this appointment, he was a teacher and economist.

== Career ==
Aguirre was appointed Minister of Development Planning on 8 February 2009, holding this position until 23 January 2010.

== Illness and death ==
In December 2023, Aguirre contracted a variant of COVID-19 and was hospitalized. He died on 2 January 2024 at Obero Hospital, where he stayed for more than 20 days.

After his death, President Luis Arce and many politicians posted condolences on social media.
