= Henry Ramos =

Henry Ramos may refer to:

- Henry J. Ramos (1950–2024), Philippine professor of physics
- Henry Ramos Allup (born 1943), Venezuelan politician and lawyer
- Henry Ramos (baseball) (born 1992), Puerto Rican baseball outfielder
