= Maira Macdonal Álvarez =

Bolivian diplomat

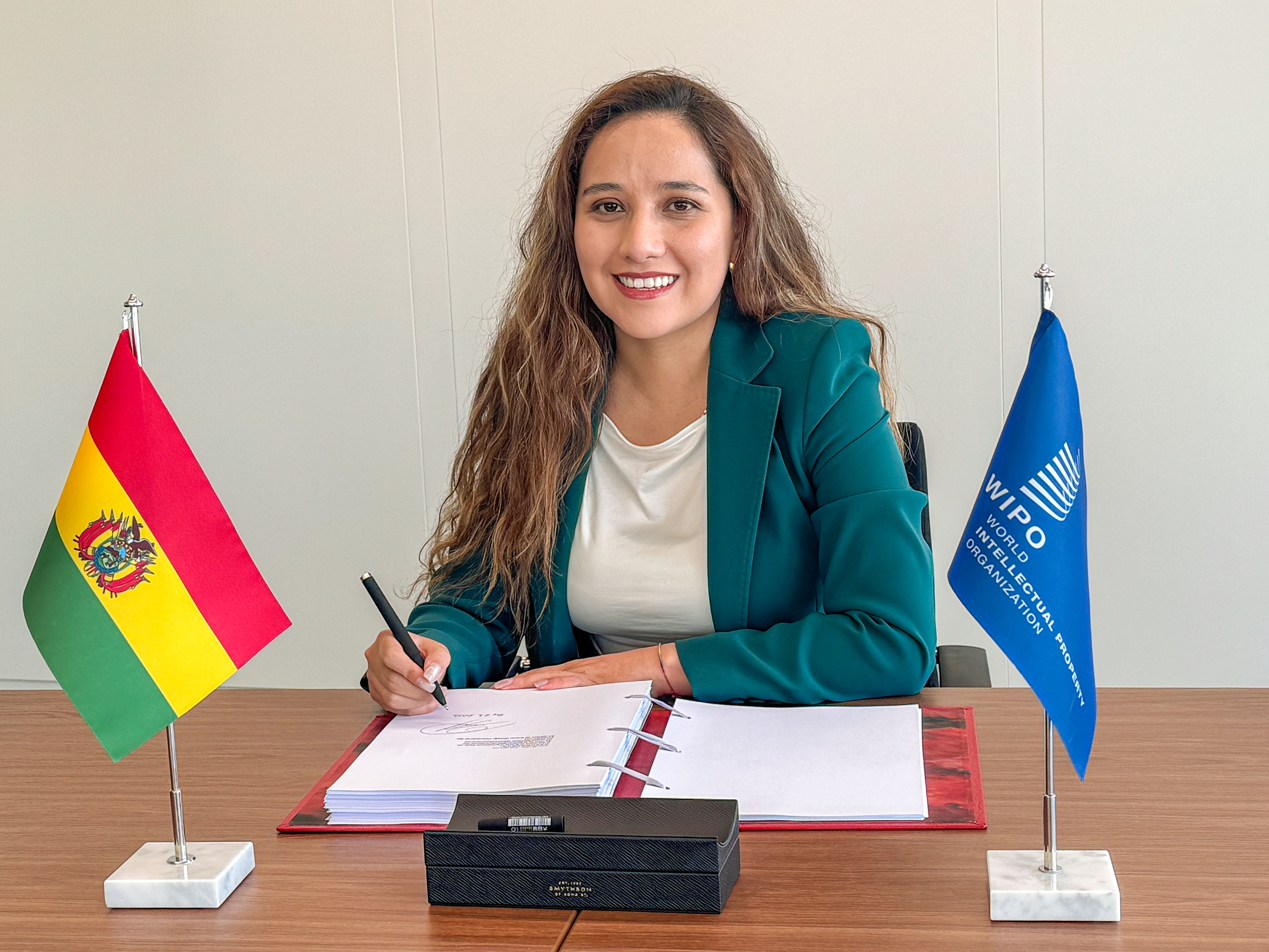
- Signing a WIPO treaty in 2025

Vice-President of the United Nations Human Rights Council (UNHRC)
- Incumbent
- Assumed office December 2022

Permanent Representative of Bolivia to the United Nations in Geneva
- Incumbent
- Assumed office March 2021

Personal details
- Education: Higher University of San Andrés; Geneva Graduate Institute; University of Zaragoza

Maira Mariela Macdonal Álvarez is a Bolivian diplomat. She was the Permanent Representative of Bolivia to the United Nations and other international organizations in Geneva, Switzerland, and one of the four Vice-Presidents of the United Nations Human Rights Council.

== Biography ==
Macdonal studied a bachelor's degree in Social Communication Sciences at the Higher University of San Andrés in La Paz, Bolivia, a master's degree in International Negotiation at the Geneva Graduate Institute and postgraduate course on Human Rights at the University of Zaragoza in Spain.

Macdonal worked in the office of the Vice President of the Plurinational State of Bolivia from 2012 to 2014. From 2014 to 2016 Macdonal served as attaché at the Permanent Mission of Bolivia to the United Nations in New York, then as Second Secretary of the Mission from 2016 to 2018 and as First Secretary of the Mission from 2018 to 2019.

Macdonal was elected the Permanent Representative of Bolivia to the United Nations and other international organizations in Geneva in March 2021. She presented her credentials to Director General of the United Nations Office at Geneva, Tatiana Valovaya.

Macdonal was elected as one of the four Vice-Presidents of the United Nations Human Rights Council (UNHRC) in December 2022, taking up her position in 2023. She was also appointed, alongside Luxembourg diplomat Marc Bichler, as co-facilitator of "a year-long consultation process on rationalisation and efficiency" of the UNHRC.

Macdonal participated in the 2024 International Day of Women in Diplomacy celebration at the Palais des Nations in Geneva. She has also supported the International Gender Champions pledges against gender-based violence and for gender parity.

In February 2025, Macdonal visited the International Civil Defense Organization (ICDO) headquarters.
