= Hugo Siles-Alvarado =

Bolivian diplomat

H.E. Hugo Siles-Alvarado

Permanent Representative to the United Nations for Bolivia
- In office July 2007 – February 2009
- Preceded by: Gustavo Guzmán
- Succeeded by: Pablo Solón Romero; Chargé d'affaires a.i.

E. Hugo Siles-Alvarado, was the Permanent Representative to the United Nations for Bolivia from July 2007 to February 2009. He is married and the father of three children.

== Education ==
Siles-Alvarado attended the University of Uppsala, Sweden, where he received a Master of Science degree in 1975. His undergraduate work was performed at the University of San Andrés in La Paz; Macalester College, Minnesota and the University of Minnesota in the United States.

== Career ==
Prior to his appointment, Siles-Alvarado worked with Varian Medical Systems from 2004 to 2005. During the same period, he was with the Las Vegas Education Department, Las Vegas, Nevada in the United States, as a physics instructor. For several months in 2004, he was a professor of basic science with the Catholic University in Cochabamba, Bolivia. Before his work as a professor of basic science, he worked in the field of medical physics in Bolivia, Ecuador and the United States, dealing with radiation therapy and radiological protection. In 1973 he began a teaching career, which encompassed physics and numerical analysis, at several Bolivian universities. His first teaching position was with the University of San Andres in La Paz.

== See also ==
- List of current permanent representatives to the United Nations
