= Rafael Ramos =

Rafael Ramos may refer to:

- Rafael Ramos (boxer) (born 1965), Puerto Rican boxer
- Rafael Ramos (cyclist) (1911–1985), Spanish cyclist
- Rafael Ramos (footballer) (born 1995), Portuguese footballer
- Rafael Ramos (police officer) (1974–2014), one of the two officers killed in the 2014 killings of NYPD officers
- Rafael Coello Ramos (1877–1967), Honduran composer
