= Ruben Ramos =

Ruben Ramos may refer to:

- Ruben Ramos (musician) (born 1940), American musician
- Ruben Ramos (politician) (born 1973), American politician
- Rubén Ramos (footballer, born 1989), Spanish football forward
- Rubén Ramos (cyclist) (born 1992), Argentine cyclist
- Rúben Ramos (footballer, born 1999), Portuguese football defensive midfielder for Moreirense
- Ruben Ramos Jr (born 2007), American soccer attacking midfielder for LA Galaxy
