= Jordávio Ramos =

Brazilian politician (born 1993)

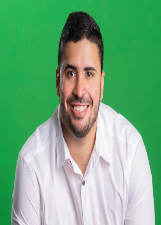
- Ramos in 2022

Member of the Legislative Assembly of Bahia
- Incumbent
- Assumed office 1 February 2023

Personal details
- Born: 24 December 1993 (age 32)
- Party: Brazilian Social Democracy Party (since 2016)

Jordávio Alexandre Espínola Ramos (born 24 December 1993) is a Brazilian politician serving as a member of the Legislative Assembly of Bahia since 2023. He has served as deputy chairman of the health and sanitation committee since 2025.
