= Jorge Ledezma =

Bolivian lawyer and politician

Jorge Ledezma Cornejo (born 24 August 1963) is a Bolivian lawyer and politician affiliated with the Movement towards Socialism–Political Instrument for the Sovereignty of the Peoples. Ledezma served as a Deputy in the lower house of the Bolivian National Congress, representing circumscription 28 (Sacaba and Chapare), and as interim prefect of Cochabamba from December 2008 until 30 May 2010. He is currently Bolivia's ambassador to Peru. His career began as vice president of Cochabamba's Departmental Irrigation Users Federation (Federación Departamental de Regantes; Fedecor) in 1997; leader of the Mega (Sacaba) Association of Irrigation Users in 1998; and president of the Vigilance Committee of the Municipality of Sacaba in 1998. He then won public office as a councilman in Sacaba in 1999, followed by serving as the city's mayor in 2000-2001. His appointment to Prefect of Cochabamba was made by President Evo Morales following the 100-day tenure of Rafael Puente; the reasons for Puente's replacement are disputed.
