= Alfredo Rada =

Bolivian politician

Alfredo Rada Vélez
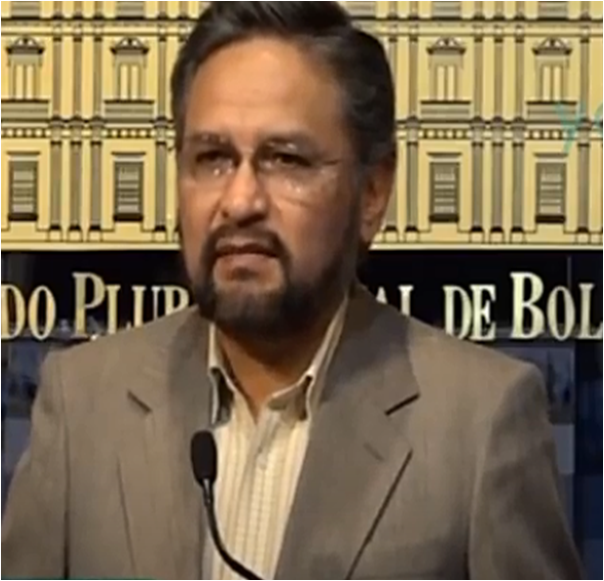

Minister of Government
- In office January 2007 – January 2010
- Minister: Evo Morales
- Preceded by: Alicia Muñoz Alá
- Succeeded by: Sacha Llorenti

Vice Minister of Coordination with Social Movements
- In office January 2006 – January 2007
- Preceded by: none
- Succeeded by: Sacha Llorenti

Personal details
- Born: 3 July 1965 (age 60)
- Occupation: Sociologist and economist

Alfredo Rada Vélez, is a former Bolivian government official previously affiliated with the Center for Juridical Studies and Social Investigation (CEJIS). He was appointed as Vice Minister of Coordination with Social Movements in January 2006, and elevated to Minister of Government (or Interior Minister) in January 2007.

After the culmination of Evo Morales first term in December 2010, Alfredo Rada started working with the National School of Politics (Escuela Nacional de Formacion Politica) with former trotskyist Carla Esposito Guevara: “Construyendo el Cambio Revolucionario”. The National School of Politics is a grassroots organization dedicated to the discussion and debate of current issues related to Bolivia and its revolutionary process. On May 18, 2012, Alfredo Rada was sworn in as Viceministro de Gestion Institucional y Consular for the Bolivian Ministry of Foreign affairs.

After the fall of Evo Morales in 2019, Rada fled from Bolivia, due to the crimes committed in the Calancha in Sucre. He is currently out of the country.
