= Milton Gómez =

Bolivian politician (1948–2022)

Minister of Labor, Employment, and Social Security
- In office 23 January 2019 – 10 November 2019
- President: Evo Morales
- Preceded by: Héctor Hinojosa
- Succeeded by: Oscar Mercado

Minister of Mining and Metallurgy
- In office 23 January 2010 – 28 January 2010
- President: Evo Morales
- Preceded by: Luis Alberto Echazú
- Succeeded by: José Pimentel

Personal details
- Born: Milton Gómez Mamani; 26 September 1948 Challapata, Oruro, Bolivia
- Died: 3 December 2022 (aged 74) La Paz, Bolivia
- Party: Movement Toward Socialism
- Occupation: Politician; trade unionist

Milton Gómez Mamani (26 September 1948 – 3 December 2022) was a Bolivian trade unionist and politician. A member of the Movement for Socialism, he served as Minister of Mining and Metallurgy for five days in January 2010 and was Minister of Labor, Employment, and Social Security from January to November 2019.

Gómez died in La Paz on 3 December 2022, at the age of 74.
