= Sacha Llorenti =

Sacha Sergio Llorenti Solíz
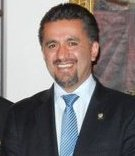
- Llorenti in 2013

Secretary General of ALBA
- Incumbent
- Assumed office 14 December 2020
- Preceded by: David Choquehuanca

Permanent Representative of Bolivia to the United Nations
- In office 5 September 2012 – 10 November 2019
- President: Evo Morales
- Preceded by: Pablo Solón Romero
- Succeeded by: Rubén Dario Cuellar

Minister of Government
- In office January 2010 – 27 September 2011
- Minister: Evo Morales
- Preceded by: Alfredo Rada
- Succeeded by: Wilfredo Chávez

Vice Minister of Coordination with Social Movements
- In office January 2007 – January 2010

Personal details
- Born: 13 March 1972 (age 54) Cochabamba, Bolivia
- Party: MAS-IPSP
- Occupation: Human rights advocate, diplomat, politician

Sacha Sergio Llorenti Soliz (born 13 March 1972) is the Secretary General of ALBA–TCP and the previous Permanent Representative to the United Nations and Ambassador of Bolivia to the United Nations from September 2012 until November 2019. He is a former Bolivian government official, published author and past president (for two years) of Bolivia's Permanent Assembly for Human Rights.

== Biography ==
Llorenti was born on 13 March 1972. He holds a bachelor's degree in law from the University of Saint Andres and the University of Aquino Bolivia.

From 2003 to 2005, Llorenti served as President of the Permanent Assembly of Human Rights. In 2005, he was Dean of the Faculty of Social and Humanistic Sciences at the University of Aquino Bolivia.

He served as Vice Minister for Coordination with Social Movements and Civil Society between 2007 and 2010, and was elevated to Minister of Government (or Interior Minister) in January 2010, until September 2011.

In 2011, representatives from the Isiboro Sécure National Park and Indigenous Territory (TIPNIS) were marching from Trinidad to La Paz in order to protest a planned highway through their land when they were violently intercepted by police. Llorenti's capacity as Minister of Government led to his indictment, and after an initial acquittal, several procedural irregularities led an appeal to the Constitutional Court. It was blocked due to an administrative technicality. As of July, 2018, no authority has been held responsible for the repression, and protests continue against the former Minister.

In 2012 Llorenti was promoted to Permanent Representative of Bolivia to the United Nations.

Llorenti was a president of Group of 77, and contributed to the UN assembly approval of creation of debt restructuring framework for foreign sovereign debt in an intention to end poverty. He was also the Chair of the United Nations General Assembly Ad Hoc Committee on Sovereign Debt Restructuring Process that resulted in the adoption of UNGA resolution 69/319 that approved the nine UN principles for sovereign debt restructuring processes.

In November 2019. the new interim Bolivian Government confirmed the termination of all ambassadors and representatives appointed by the removed president Evo Morales, including Llorenti.

On 14 December 2020 at the XVIII Ordinary Summit of the Bolivarian Alliance for the Peoples of Our America – Peoples' Trade Treaty (ALBA–TCP) he was unanimously elected Secretary General of ALBA–TCP
