= Mario Guillén =

Bolivian Minister of Economy

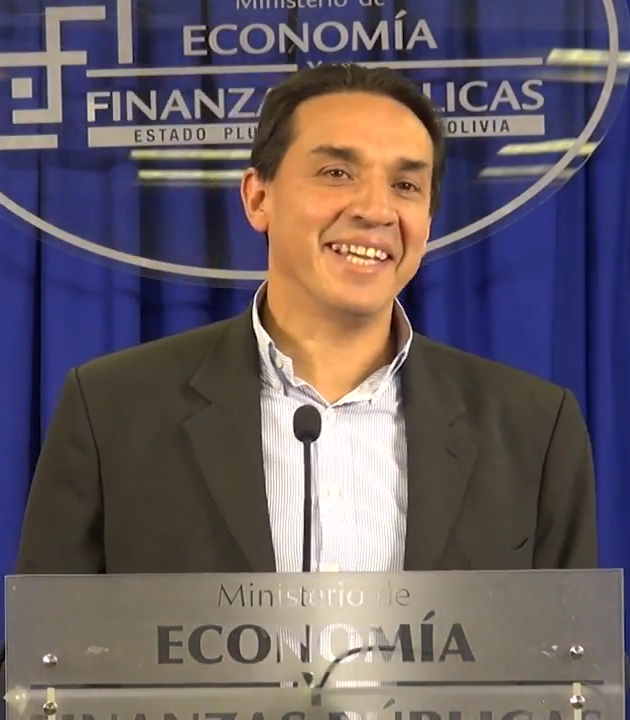

General Manager of Union Bank
- In office 23 March 2019 – 28 November 2019
- Preceded by: Rolando Marín
- Succeeded by: Antonio Sivila

Minister of Economy and Public Finance
- In office 26 June 2017 – 23 January 2019
- President: Evo Morales
- Preceded by: Luis Arce
- Succeeded by: Luis Arce

Vice Minister of Pensions and Financial Services
- In office 1 February 2009 – 26 June 2017
- President: Evo Morales
- Preceded by: Office established
- Succeeded by: Oscar Ferrufino

Personal details
- Born: Mario Alberto Guillén Suárez; 23 March 1968 (age 57) Tarija, Bolivia
- Party: Movement for Socialism
- Education: Military School of Engineering; Higher University of San Andrés; Catholic University San Pablo

Mario Alberto Guillén Suárez (born 23 March 1968) is a Bolivian industrial engineer, lawyer, and politician who served as Minister of Economy and Public Finance from 2017 to 2019 during the administration of Evo Morales. Prior, he was Vice Minister of Pensions and Financial Services from 2009 to 2017 and served as the general manager of the Union Bank in 2019.

== Early life and career ==
Mario Guillén was born on 23 March 1968 in Tarija. In 1986, he entered the Military School of Engineering in La Paz, obtaining a degree in industrial engineering in 1992. From 1995 to 1996, Guillén completed a master's degree in business administration at the Bolivian Catholic University San Pablo. In 2002, he entered law school at the Higher University of San Andrés, graduating as a lawyer in 2008, at age 40.

Guillén served as an undergraduate and graduate professor at different public and private universities in Bolivia, teaching at the University of San Simón in the city of Cochabamba, as well as at the University of the Andes and the European Business School, among others. From 1999 to 2009 he working in banking, spending a large part of his career at the Superintendency of Pensions, Securities, and Insurance.

== Minister of Economy and Public Finance (2017–2019) ==
On 1 February 2009, Minister of Economy Luis Arce appointed Guillén Vice Minister of Pensions and Financial Services, a position he would hold for 9 years. During his tenure as vice minister, Guillén worked to promote the Pensions Law and the Financial Services Law.

On 24 June 2017, Luis Arce resigned as minister of economy in order to travel to Brazil to undergo treatment for kidney cancer. Two days later, Arce was succeeded as minister by Guillén in what President Evo Morales called a "momentary change" until Arce returned. Guillén stated that he regarded Arce as a "teacher, companion, and friend" and affirmed his "unwavering commitment to apply the economic model that allowed us to achieve stability." He remained minister of economy until 23 January 2019 when his predecessor Luis Arce returned from Brazil and resumed office.

=== Manager of Union Bank ===
Following the return of Arce, it was announced on 23 March 2019 that Guillén would assume the position of General Manager of the Union Bank, replacing Rolando Marín as the head of one of the largest banks in Bolivia. However, on 28 November 2019, the newly installed interim government of Jeanine Áñez removed him from that position and replaced him with Antonio Sivila. On 9 September 2020, Vice Minister of Transparency Guido Melgar accused Guillén as well as other former ministers including Luis Arce of dereliction of duty, and demanded their accounts be frozen.

Political offices
Preceded by Office established	Vice Minister of Pensions and Financial Services; 2009–2017	Succeeded by Oscar Ferrufino
Preceded by Luis Arce	Minister of Economy and Finance; 2017–2019	Succeeded by Luis Arce
Government offices
Preceded by Rolando Marín	General Manager of Union Bank; 2019	Succeeded by Antonio Sivila
