= Verónica Ramos =

Bolivian economist and politician

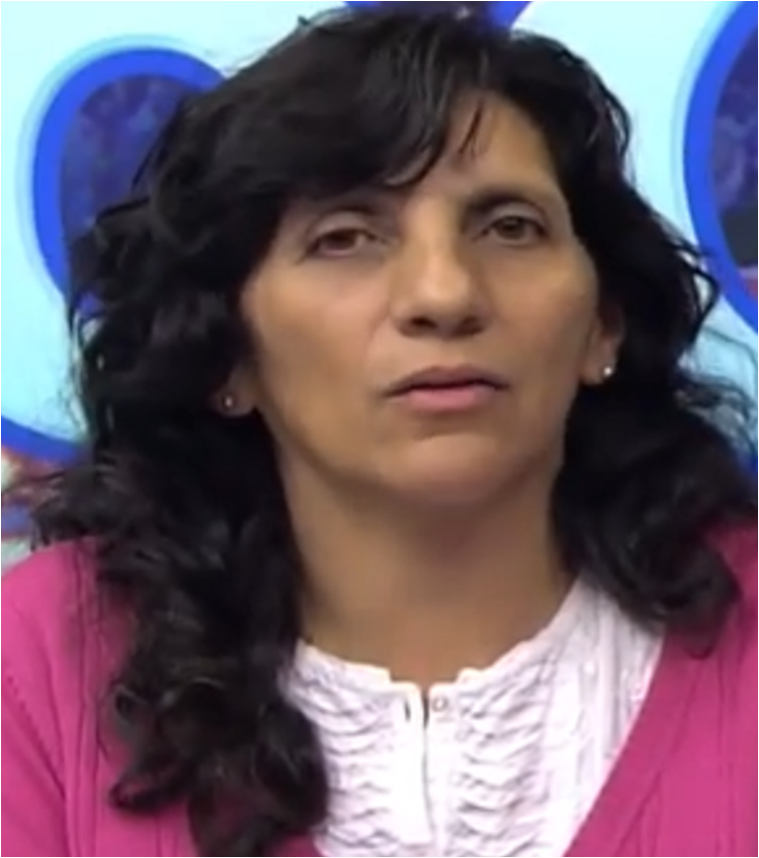

Minister of Productive Development and Plural Economy of Bolivia
- In office 22 January 2015 – 22 January 2017
- President: Evo Morales
- Preceded by: Ana Teresa Morales
- Succeeded by: Eugenio Rojas

Personal details
- Born: Ana Verónica Ramos Morales La Paz, Bolivia
- Party: Movement for Socialism
- Parent: Pablo Ramos (father)
- Education: Higher University of San Andrés
- Occupation: Economist, professor, politician

Ana Verónica Ramos Morales is a Bolivian economist, university professor, and former general manager of the Productive Development Bank (BDP). She was the Minister of Productive Development and Plural Economy of Bolivia from January 2015 to January 2017, during the third government of President Evo Morales.

== Biography ==
Verónica Ramos was born in La Paz, the daughter of the economist, writer and former prefect of La Paz Department, Pablo Ramos. In 1983, she entered the Faculty of Economics of the Higher University of San Andrés (UMSA), graduating with a licentiate in economics in 1988.

In 1994, she earned a master's in agricultural development (CIDES-UMSA), and in 2008 she earned a doctorate in social economy (CEE-UMSA).

She also participated in several research projects of different institutions related to the field of economics. Before becoming a government minister, she held the position of general manager of the BDP from 2012 to 2014.

== Minister of Productive Development (2015–2017) ==
On 22 January 2015, President Evo Morales appointed Verónica Ramos as the country's new Minister of Productive Development and Plural Economy, replacing Ana Teresa Morales.

In May 2015, bakeries in La Paz and El Alto began a cessation of activities, paralyzing the distribution of bread and causing a confrontation over its shortage at the headquarters of the Bolivian government. Minister Ramos maintained that the strike was unjustified since the bakers' objective was to raise the price of bread to 50 centavos per unit. During the dispute, her ministry's Food Production Support Company (EMAPA) sold bread to citizens at 40 centavos per unit. This was prepared by soldiers from military units by order of the Ministry of Defense. EMAPA also sold meat to citizens during a strike by butchers and retailers over new tax rules the following month.

Ramos remained in the position for two years, handing over the ministry to her successor, Eugenio Rojas Apaza, on 23 January 2017.

On 6 March 2017, the Minister of the Presidency, René Martínez Callahuanca, appointed Verónica Ramos to the position of Director of the Technical Office for the Strengthening of Public Enterprise (OFEP), under the Ministry of the Presidency.
