= Mabel Monje =

Bolivian politician

Julieta Mabel Monje Villa (born in Corocoro, Pacajes Province) is a Bolivian politician and lawyer. She was named Minister of Environment and Water on January 23, 2010.

Monje Villa is a lawyer and social movement activist who has lived in El Alto since 1977. She graduated in law from Universidad Mayor de San Andrés. She has also worked as a teacher in philosophy. She has worked with social movements in El Alto, such as organizations like Regional Workers Confederation (COR), FEJUVE (Federation of Neighbourhood Committees) and the Women's president of the neighbourhood organization of Urbanización Anexo 16 de Julio, and represented the neighbourhood in the FEJUVE of El Alto. Monje Villa has served as the vice president of the Permanent Assembly for Human Rights of El Alto (APDHEA).

Monje Villa was elected as the alternate member of the Legislative Assembly of La Paz Department in April 2010, being the alternate of Felix Loayza Rojas.

Until 2007, she headed her neighborhood council and represented it in the Federation of Neighborhood Councils of El Alto (FEJUVE). She was later elected as Vice President of the Permanent Assembly for Human Rights—El Alto. She is the second El Alto resident to serve in the cabinet of President Evo Morales, following Abel Mamani, the former president of FEJUVE who served in the same office in 2006 and 2007. Monje Villa replaced María Udaeta as the Minister for Environment and Water, in a cabinet reshuffle that followed the December 2010 protest against increased petrol prices. At her inauguration, Monje Villa stated that her foremost priority as Minister would be to combat climate change.
