= Alessandra Ramos Makkeda =

Human rights activist (1981–2022)

- Born: October 8, 1981; Brasília, DF, Brazil
- Died: May 15, 2022 (aged 40); Rio de Janeiro, RJ, Brazil
- Occupation(s): Human Rights Activist, adviser, translator, interpreter

Alessandra Ramos Makkeda (October 8, 1981 – May 15, 2022) was a Brazilian human rights defender and a prominent activist on LGBTI issues.

Alessandra was born in 1981 in Brasília and lived in Rio de Janeiro. She was a trans woman and an LGBTI activist, and worked as a translator and interpreter in several languages, including Brazilian Sign Language. Alessandra was a member of Transrevolução, a Rio-based group that fights discrimination and promotes discussions of lesbian, gay and transgender issues. As one of the co-ordinators of the National Forum for Afro-Brazilian transgender people, she helped to organize the first National Black Trans Forum in Porto Alegre in 2015. Alessandra died on May 15, 2022, in her native Brazil, after a sudden illness.
