= Pablo Solón Romero =

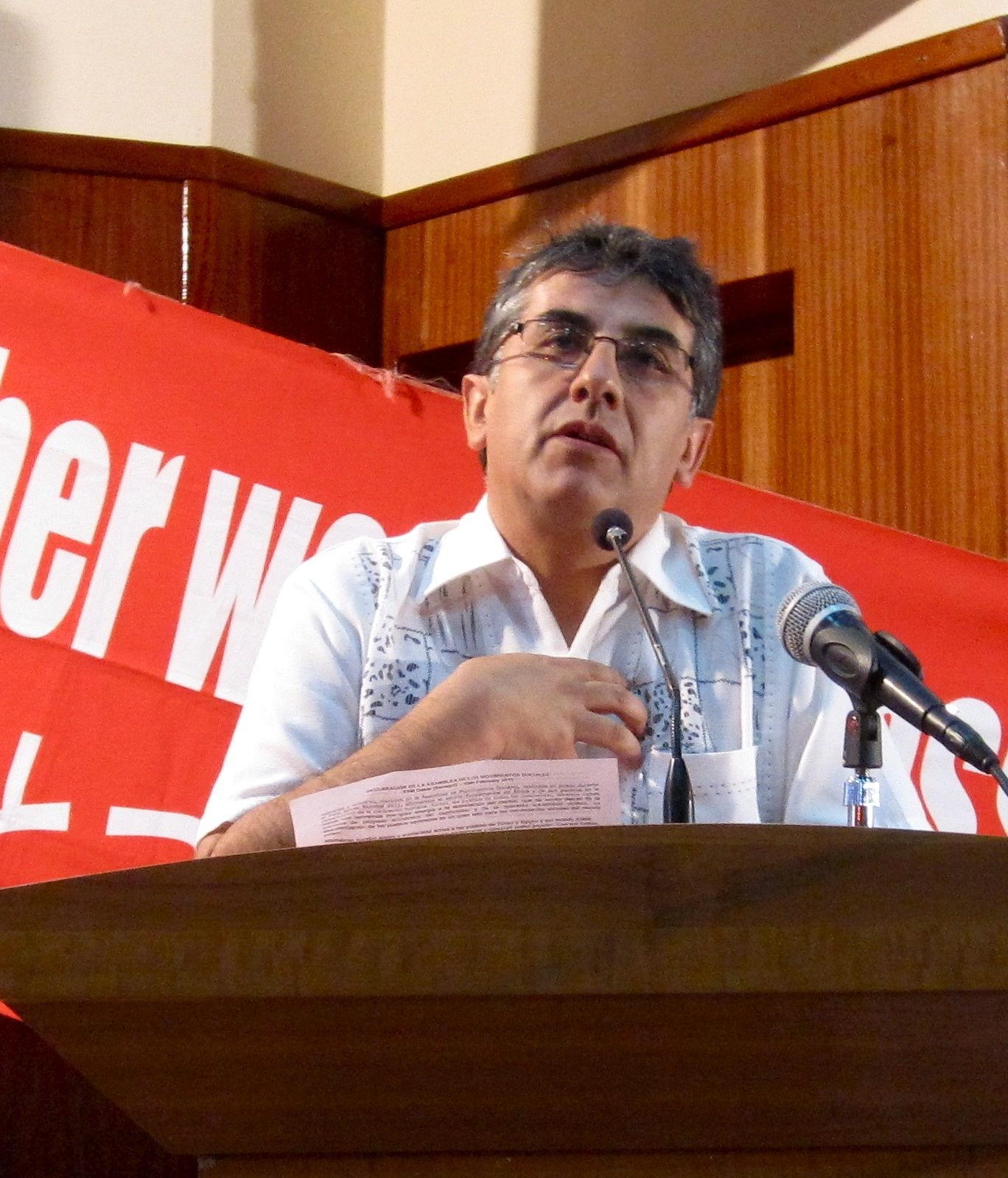

Permanent Representative to the United Nations for Bolivia
- In office February 2009 – July 2011
- Preceded by: Hugo Siles-Alvarado
- Succeeded by: Sacha Llorenty

Pablo Solón Romero served as Ambassador of the Plurinational State of Bolivia to the United Nations from February 2009 to July 2011. He is the son of the famous Bolivian muralist Walter Solón Romero Gonzáles. He served as the executive director of Focus on the Global South, an activist think tank based in Bangkok from 2012 to 2015.

== Career ==
Before becoming Ambassador to the United Nations, Pablo Solón Romero worked as an activist for many years with different social organizations, indigenous movements, workers’ unions, student associations, human rights and cultural organizations in Bolivia.

Under the administration of President Evo Morales, he has served as Ambassador for issues concerning Integration and Trade, Secretary of the Union of South American Nations (UNASUR) (December 2006 to May 2008) and a delegate in the Strategic Reflection Committee for South American Integration (2006).

As Ambassador to the UN, Solón spearheaded successful resolutions on the Human Right to Water, International Mother Earth Day, Harmony with Nature, and the Rights of Indigenous Peoples. He was very active in climate change negotiations under the UNFCCC, and helped organize the World People's Conference on Climate Change in Cochabamba, Bolivia in 2010.

At COP16, the UNFCCC conference in Cancun, he defended a strong position by Bolivia.

He participated in December 2011 in the Durban COP17 and he advocated there that it is time to change how we relate with nature and restore harmony with nature. Criticizing the limits of the so-called "green economy" he declared: «The current relation with nature is through the market. You have to buy it. The problem with green economy is that they are saying capitalism has failed because we have not put a price on nature. The logic is that you do not take care of what does not have a price. We must change the paradigm of how we relate with Mother Earth. It is not a problem of compensation it is of restoration. The green economy will include insurance so that if your environmental property is damaged you will be compensated. We need a citizens tribunal for the environment».

In April 2012, it was announced that Solón had become the executive director of the Bangkok-based NGO Focus on the Global South where he worked on the issue of climate change and promoted the Declaration on the Rights of Mother Earth . In September 2012, he participated in several workshops of the Summer University of the altermondialist NGO Attac in Toulouse (France). In June 2015, Pablo Solon resigned as executive director in order to return to Bolivia.

== Awards ==
Pablo Solón was named the 2011 international Human Rights Award winner by Global Exchange.

== See also ==
- List of current permanent representatives to the United Nations
