= Wilfredo Chávez =

Bolivian politician (born 1969)

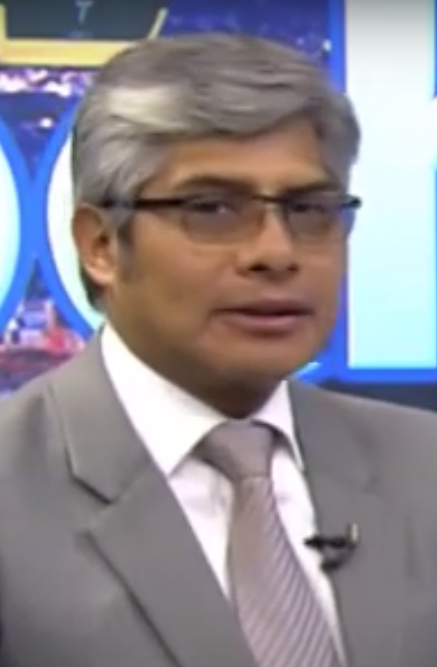
- Chávez in August 2019

Attorney General of Bolivia
- Incumbent
- Assumed office 12 November 2020
- President: Luis Arce
- Preceded by: Alberto Javier Morales

Deputy Minister of Citizen Security
- In office 25 January 2018 – 10 November 2019
- President: Evo Morales
- Preceded by: Gonzalo Trigoso
- Succeeded by: Wilson Santamaría

Minister of Government
- In office 27 September 2011 – 23 January 2012
- President: Evo Morales
- Preceded by: Sacha Llorenti
- Succeeded by: Carlos Romero

Deputy Minister of Government Coordination
- In office 6 May 2009 – 27 September 2011
- President: Evo Morales
- Preceded by: Rebeca Delgado Burgoa
- Succeeded by: Javier Baldivieso Medina

Deputy Minister of Justice and Human Rights
- In office 18 August 2007 – 6 May 2009
- President: Evo Morales
- Preceded by: Renato Pardo Angles
- Succeeded by: María Cecilia Rocabado

Personal details
- Born: Wilfredo Franz David Chávez Serrano; 26 June 1969 (age 56) La Paz, Bolivia
- Political party: MAS-IPSP
- Education: Higher University of San Andrés

Wilfredo Franz David Chávez Serrano (born 26 June 1969) is a Bolivian lawyer, professor, and politician serving as the Attorney General of Bolivia since 12 November 2020 during the government of Luis Arce. He previously served as Minister of the Government from September 2011 to January 2012 during the government of Evo Morales.

== Biography ==
Wilfredo Chávez was born on 26 June 1969 in La Paz, Bolivia. He graduated as a lawyer from the Higher University of San Andrés (UMSA) in 1996. Since 2011, he has tenured as a professor at the UMSA Law School. Chavéz is a consultant, legal and political analyst, and maintains a critical position on the Bolivian justice system, formulating its absolute reconfiguration, which is reflected in his two master's and doctorate theses and various papers and press articles.

== Political career ==
=== Ministerial positions ===
==== Deputy Minister of Justice and Human Rights (2007–2009) ====
On 18 August 2007 at age 38, Chávez was appointed Deputy Minister of Justice and Human Rights by Vice Minister of Justice Celima Torrico.

==== Deputy Minister of Government and Coordination (2009–2011) ====
He was reassigned from his previous position on 6 May 2009 when Minister of the Presidency Juan Ramón Quintana appointed him Deputy Minister of Government and Coordination replacing Rebeca Delgado who had resigned on 28 April.

==== Minister of Government (2011–2012) ====
In September 2011, the then Minister of Government Sacha Llorenti was forced to resign from his post due to the scandal regarding police repression carried out in Chaparina against indigenous people marching towards La Paz. On 28 September, President Evo Morales appointed Chávez as the new Minister of Government. He held the position until 23 January 2012.

==== Deputy Minister of Citizen Security (2018–2019) ====
Chávez's successor, Minister of Government Carlos Romero appointed him Deputy Minister of Citizen Security on 25 January 2018. On 10 November 2019 he was forced to resign as a result of the ongoing political crisis.

=== Attorney General of Bolivia (2020–present) ===
He returned to government on 12 November 2020 when President Luis Arce appointed him to the position of Attorney General. On 18 January 2021, Chávez defended the hiring of Evaliz Morales, the daughter of former President Evo Morales. Chávez assured that Morales, who graduated as a lawyer in late 2018, would "prove her high social, political, and professional commitment to the defense of Human Rights, an area of her work."
