= Reggie Ramos =

Public policy practitioner

Reggie Ramos is a public policy practitioner. She is the executive director of Transportation for Massachusetts (T4MA), a statewide coalition that works to improve the transportation systems of the Commonwealth of Massachusetts.

== Early life and education ==
Ramos was born and raised in the Philippines. She has a juris doctor from Ateneo de Manila University. She left the Philippines and moved to Massachusetts in 2018 where she received a master’s in public administration from the Harvard Kennedy School of Government. She has been a Mason Fellow at Harvard (2018-2019) and an AsiaGlobal Fellow at The University of Hong Kong (2017-2018).

== Career ==
Ramos served as Undersecretary for Transportation for the Republic of the Philippines where she oversaw the expansion of the Mactan-Cebu International Airport and Manila’s Automated Fare Collection System. She has worked as an international negotiator, representing the Philippine government at the 2021 United Nations Climate Change Conference and helped negotiate the Paris Agreement.

Once she lived in Massachusetts, she had a role as the Deputy Director of Pilots and Innovation at the MBTA and was then director of inclusive public transit at the Institute of Human Centered Design which had a contract from the MBTA to test inclusivity features. While at the MBTA she helped implement Boston’s first fare-free bus route.

She became Executive Director of T4MA in 2023 after a restructuring process. Ramos sees having high-quality public transportation as a matter of civil rights and wants to put the "lived experiences of people at the center" of T4MA's advocacy efforts. She would like to see Boston investing in transportation solutions which can ease up traffic congestion and grapple with the intersection of public transportation issues with topics such as climate change and housing shortages.
