= Anthony Ramos (disambiguation) =

Anthony Ramos (born 1991) is an American actor known for his roles in the musical Hamilton and the 2021 film In the Heights.

Anthony Ramos or Tony Ramos may also refer to:

- Anthony Ramos (artist) (born 1944), American artist
- Tony Ramos (born 1948), Brazilian actor
- Tony Ramos (wrestler) (born 1991), American wrestler
