= Carlos Romero Bonifaz =

Bolivian politician (born 1966)

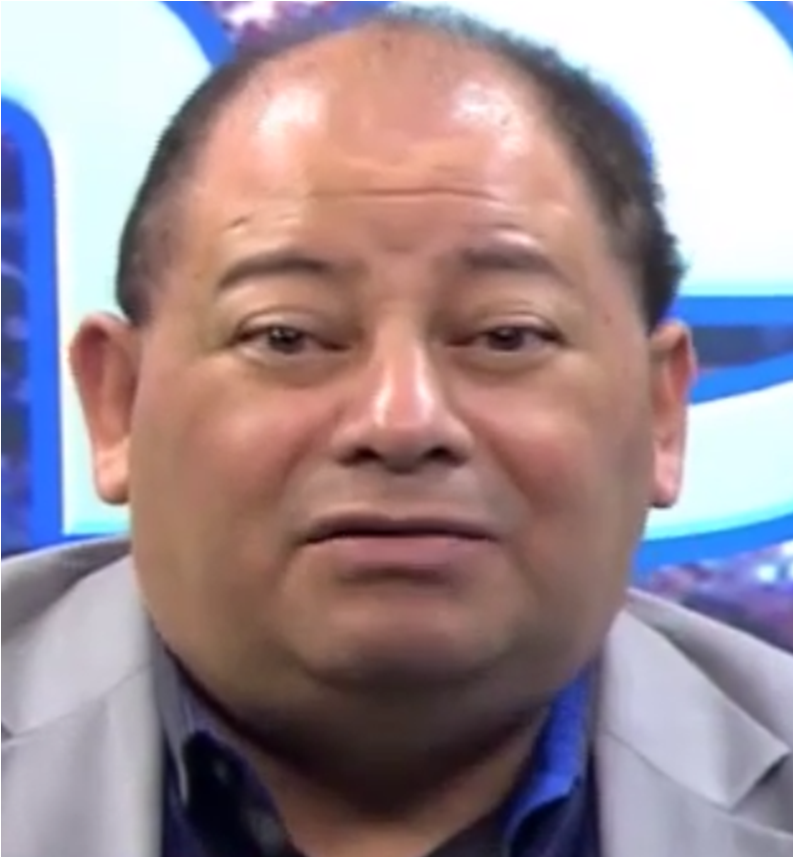

Minister of Government
- In office 26 May 2015 – 10 November 2019
- President: Evo Morales
- Preceded by: Hugo Moldiz
- Succeeded by: Arturo Murillo
- In office 23 January 2012 – 15 July 2014
- Preceded by: Wilfredo Chávez
- Succeeded by: Jorge Pérez Valenzuela

Senator for Santa Cruz
- In office 22 January 2015 – 26 May 2015
- Alternate: Adriana Salvatierra
- Preceded by: Gabriela Montaño
- Succeeded by: Adriana Salvatierra
Other offices
Minister of the Presidency
In office 14 June 2011 – 23 January 2012
President	Evo Morales
Preceded by	Óscar Coca
Succeeded by	Juan Ramón Quintana
Minister of Autonomies
In office 8 February 2009 – 14 June 2011
President	Evo Morales
Preceded by	Office established
Succeeded by	Claudia Peña Claros
Minister of Rural Development, Agriculture, and Environment
In office 8 September 2008 – 8 February 2009
President	Evo Morales
Preceded by	Susana Rivero Guzmán
Succeeded by	Julia Ramos as minister of rural development and lands

Personal details
- Born: Carlos Gustavo Romero Bonifaz; 23 August 1966 (age 59) La Paz, Bolivia
- Party: Movement for Socialism
- Parent(s): Carlos Romero Loria; Marina Bonifaz Ponce
- Education: Higher University of San Andrés

Carlos Gustavo Romero Bonifaz (born 23 August 1966) is a Bolivian lawyer and politician who served as minister of government from 2012 to 2014 and from 2015 to 2019. A member of the Movement for Socialism, Romero previously served as minister of the presidency from 2011 to 2012, as minister of autonomies from 2009 to 2011, and as minister of rural development from 2008 to 2009. In 2014, he was elected Senator for Santa Cruz, a position he held briefly between January and May 2015.

Political offices
Preceded by Susana Rivero Guzmán	Minister of Rural Development, Agriculture, and Environment; 2008–2009	Succeeded by Julia Ramos as minister of rural development and lands
Preceded by Office established	Minister of Autonomies; 2009–2011	Succeeded by Claudia Peña Claros
Preceded by Óscar Coca	Minister of the Presidency; 2011–2012	Succeeded by Juan Ramón Quintana
Preceded by Wilfredo Chávez	Minister of Government; 2012–2014	Succeeded by Jorge Pérez Valenzuela
Preceded by Gabriela Montaño	Senator for Santa Cruz; 2015	Succeeded by Adriana Salvatierra
Vacant Title last held by Hugo Moldiz	Minister of Government; 2015–2019	Vacant Title next held by Arturo Murillo
