= Henry J. Ramos =

Dr. Henry Jacala Ramos (July 15, 1950 - March 11, 2024) was a professor emeritus of Physics at the University of the Philippines Diliman and the first Filipino experimental plasma physicist. He was the founder of the Plasma Physics Laboratory, National Institute of Physics, UP Diliman College of Science.

His work on formation of titanium nitride films received patents from the United States, Philippines, Malaysia, Germany, Sweden, Taiwan, Japan, Singapore and China.
