= María Udaeta =

Bolivian politician

María Udaeta Velásquez is a Bolivian politician. She served as Minister for Environment and Water in the cabinet of Evo Morales until being replaced by Julieta Mabel Monje in a 2010 reshuffling.
