= Emilio Villanueva =

Bolivian architect

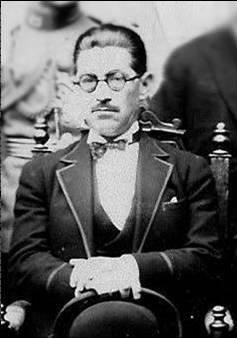
- Emilio Villanueva in 1929
- Born: November 28, 1882; La Paz, Bolivia
- Died: May 14, 1970 (aged 87); La Paz, Bolivia
- Occupation: Architect
- Buildings: Banco Central; Alcaldia de La Paz; Hospital General; Stadium Hernando Siles

Emilio Villanueva Peñaranda (November 28, 1882, in La Paz, Bolivia – May 14, 1970, in La Paz, Bolivia) was a revolutionary Bolivian architect. His parents were Jose Villanueva (1831–1882) and Maria Peñaranda (1852–1942). His brother, Dr. José Gabino Villanueva, was considered one of the foremost surgeons of South America and was elected Bolivian president in 1925, though he never took office. Despite all adversities (his father died the same year he was born), Emilio Villanueva managed to establish a successful professional and political career.

Emilio Villanueva is important for his dual role as urban planner and architect. For more than 30 years he has exerted a powerful influence over the shape of La Paz. His most important work is the city hall of La Paz. In 1914 he marries Hortensia Nuñez del Prado.
