= Marcelo Ramos (footballer, born 1972) =

Uruguayan footballer

Personal information
- Full name: Marcelo Ramos
- Date of birth: 27 December 1972 (age 53)
- Place of birth: Montevideo, Uruguay
- Position: Forward

Senior career*
Years	Team	Apps	(Gls)
1992–1994	Progreso		
1995–1996	Villa Española		
1997–1998	Liverpool Montevideo		
1999	Unión San Felipe		(10)
2000	Deportes Linares		(7)
2001	Racing Montevideo		
2001–2002	River Plate Montevideo		
2003	Salto FC		
- * Club domestic league appearances and goals

Marcelo Ramos (born 27 December 1972, in Montevideo, Uruguay) is a former Uruguayan footballer who played for clubs of Uruguay and Chile.

== Teams ==
- Progreso 1992–1994
- Villa Española 1995–1996
- Liverpool 1997–1998
- Unión San Felipe 1999
- Deportes Linares 2000
- Racing 2001
- River Plate 2001–2002
- Salto 2003
