= Julia Ramos =

Bolivian nurse and politician

Minister of Land and Rural Development of Bolivia
- In office 9 February 2009 – 24 January 2010
- President: Evo Morales
- Succeeded by: Nemesia Achacollo

Plurinational Deputy of Bolivia
- In office 24 January 2006 – 9 February 2009
- President: Evo Morales
- Constituency: Tarija Department

Personal details
- Born: Julia Damiana Ramos Sánchez; 12 April 1963 (age 63) Tarija, Bolivia
- Party: Movement for Socialism
- Education: Universidad Juan Misael Saracho
- Occupation: Nurse, politician

Julia Damiana Ramos Sánchez (born 12 April 1963) is a Bolivian nurse and politician. She was a Plurinational deputy from 2006 to 2009, and Minister of Land and Rural Development from 2009 to 2010, during the first government of Evo Morales.

== Biography ==
Julia Ramos was born in the city of Tarija on 12 April 1963. Her primary and secondary studies took place in her hometown. She continued with her education, studying nursing at the Universidad Juan Misael Saracho (UJMS), where she became a member of the executive committee of the Local University Foundation (Federación Universitaria Local; FUL).

== Political career ==
Julia Ramos began her political career in small community posts. Between 1985 and 1989, beginning when she was 22 years old, Ramos held the positions of secretary of education and then secretary of health of the Single Trade Union Federation of Peasant Workers of Tarija (Federación Sindical Única de Trabajadores Campesinos de Tarija; FSUTCT). From 1996 to 1999, she joined the Bartolina Sisa Federation of the city of La Paz, reaching a position where her leadership could emerge at the national level.

After returning to Tarija, Ramos founded the first departmental section of the Bartolina Sisa Federation in that city, and became its main leader. She was re-elected twice, in 2000 and 2007. Ramos joined the militant Movement for Socialism (Movimiento al Socialismo; MAS), a party for which she was a candidate for deputy in the 2002 general election, but was not elected.

Three years later, in the following 2005 general election, Ramos was once again a candidate for deputy for MAS. This time she won, taking office on 24 January 2006. While she was in the position of Plurinational deputy, Ramos presided over caucuses of indigenous South Americans (an initiative of the United Nations).

On 2 February 2009, President Evo Morales appointed her Minister of Land and Rural Development. On 24 January 2010, Julia Ramos was replaced in her position as minister by Nemesia Achacollo, a Chapare union leader.

Five years after leaving the ministry, in 2015, Julia Ramos was linked by the courts to the Indigenous Development Fund (Fondo de Desarrollo Indígena; FONDIOC) corruption case.
