= Nila Heredia =

Bolivian politician (born 1943)

Nila Heredia Miranda
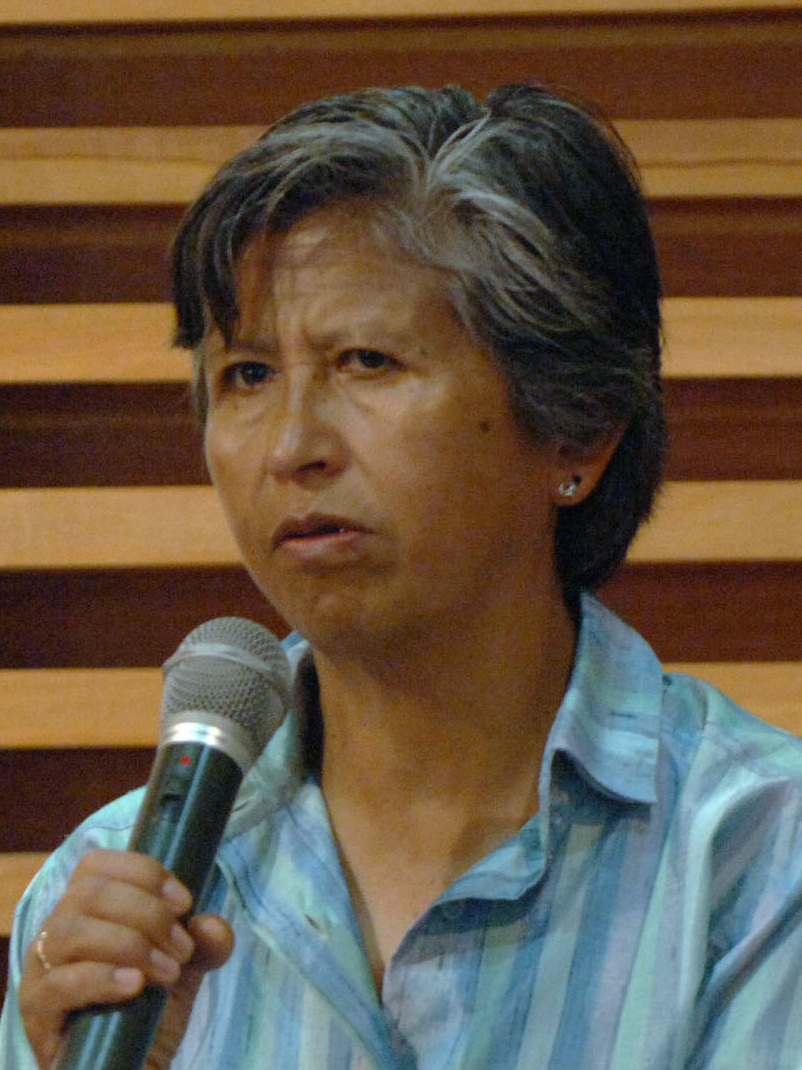

Minister of Health and Sports
- In office 16 May 2010 – 2012
- Minister: Evo Morales
- Preceded by: Sonia Polo
- Succeeded by: Juan Carlos Calvimontes Camargo

Vice Minister of Health and Health Promotion
- In office February 2010 – 16 May 2010

Minister of Health and Sports
- In office January 2006 – January 2008
- Succeeded by: Wálter Selum

Personal details
- Born: 21 September 1943 (age 82) Uyuni, Potosí, Bolivia
- Occupation: Medical school docent, Administrator

Nila Heredia Miranda (born in Uyuni, Potosí) is a former medical school anatomy professor and administrator, former leftist militant, and Bolivia's Minister of Health and Sports, a position she has occupied twice.

In the 1970s, Heredia was a member of the Revolutionary Workers' Party of Bolivia and the National Liberation Army during the dictatorship of Hugo Banzer. She was detained by government forces on 2 April 1976, and according to a petition filed with the Inter-American Court of Human Rights, tortured in the prefectural headquarters in Cochabamba and held in Viacha prison.
