= Nardi Suxo =

Bolivian lawyer and sociologist

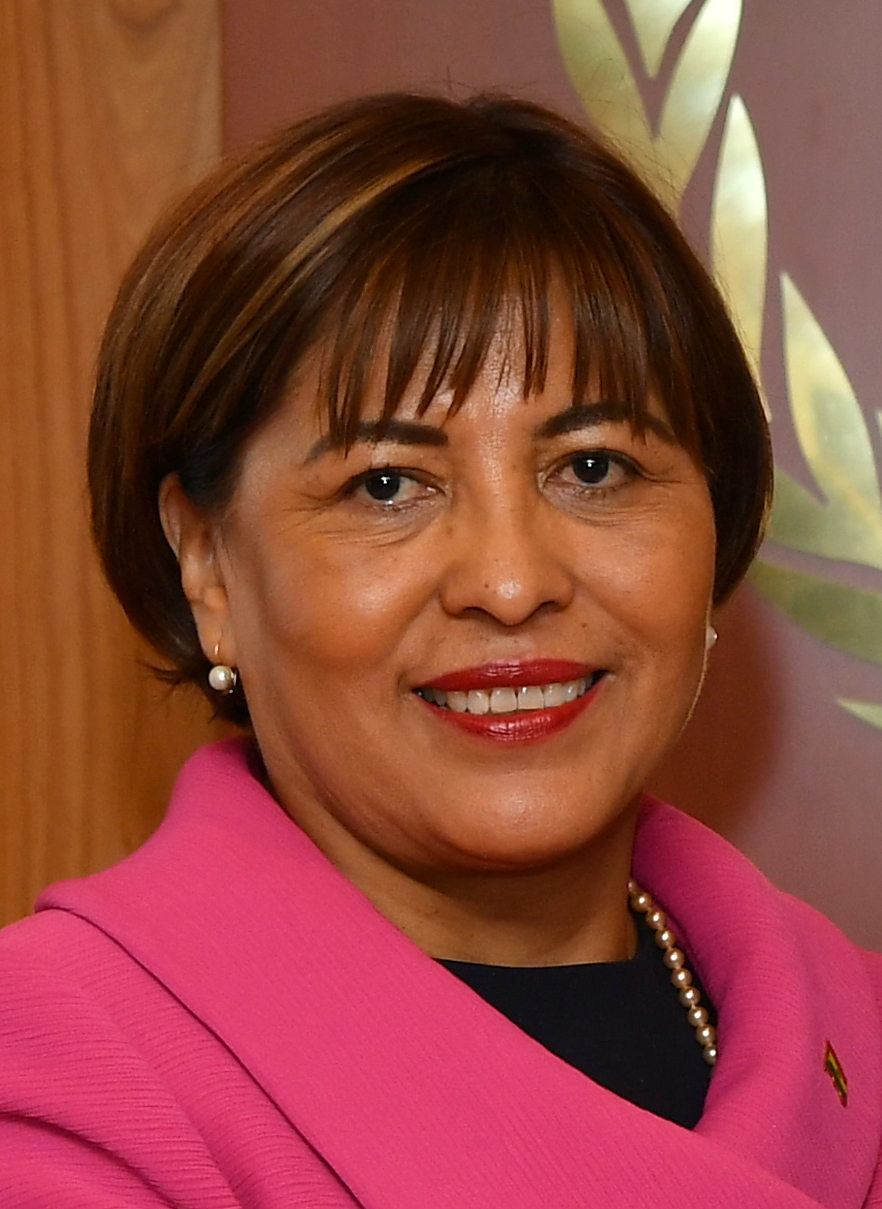

Ambassador of Bolivia to Spain since 2022, to Austria, Croatia, Hungary, and Slovakia
- In office 2 June 2019 – 15 November 2019

Permanent representative of Bolivia to the United Nations in Geneva
- In office 13 May 2015 – 2018

Minister of Institutional Transparency and Fight Against Corruption of Bolivia
- In office 22 January 2006 – 23 January 2015
- President: Evo Morales
- Succeeded by: Lenny Valdivia

Personal details
- Born: Nardi Elizabeth Suxo Iturry; 23 February 1961 (age 65) La Paz, Bolivia
- Party: Movement for Socialism
- Education: Higher University of San Andrés
- Occupation: Lawyer, sociologist, politician

Nardi Elizabeth Suxo Iturry (born 23 February 1961) is a Bolivian lawyer and sociologist. She served as the ambassador of Bolivia to Austria, Croatia, Hungary, and Slovakia from June to November 2019.

She was the country's Minister of Institutional Transparency and Fight Against Corruption from 2006 to 2015, during the first and second governments of President Evo Morales. During her tenure, the Bolivian state recovered about 800 million bolivianos (US$115 million) through more than 100 convictions in corruption cases.

== Early life and education ==
Nardi Suxo was born in La Paz on 23 February 1961, (Note: In 2012, the newspaper La Estrella del Oriente reported that Suxo was actually born in Pomata, Peru on 26 September 1955.) to parents Humberto Suxo and Yolanda Angélica Iturry Gutiérrez.

She began her education in 1967, completing a baccalaureate in La Paz in 1978. In 1979, she entered the Higher University of San Andrés, graduating with a law degree in 1985. She also earned a degree as a sociologist years later, and obtained a human rights diploma from Charles III University of Madrid.

During her working life she served as director of the Carter Center in Bolivia. She was a second deputy delegate in the area of human rights at the ombudsman's office, and also held the position of director of the Universidad Católica Boliviana's Institute of Legal Research.

== Minister of Institutional Transparency and Fight against Corruption ==
With the election of Evo Morales as President of Bolivia, Nardi Suxo became one of the first ministers of the Movement for Socialism (MAS) government. On 23 January 2006, Morales appointed her minister of the recently created Ministry of Institutional Transparency and Fight against Corruption. She remained in office for nine years, thus becoming one of the longest-serving ministers (along with Luis Alberto Arce Catacora, David Choquehuanca, and Roberto Iván Aguilar Gómez).

During her tenure, about 800 million bolivianos (US$115 million) were recovered by the government, with over 100 public servants convicted of acts of corruption.

Awareness campaigns for the Bolivian population were also carried out, with a "Caravan of Transparency" touring various cities and towns.

Nardi Suxo left the post of transparency minister on 22 January 2015, being replaced by Lenny Valdivia.

== Diplomatic career ==
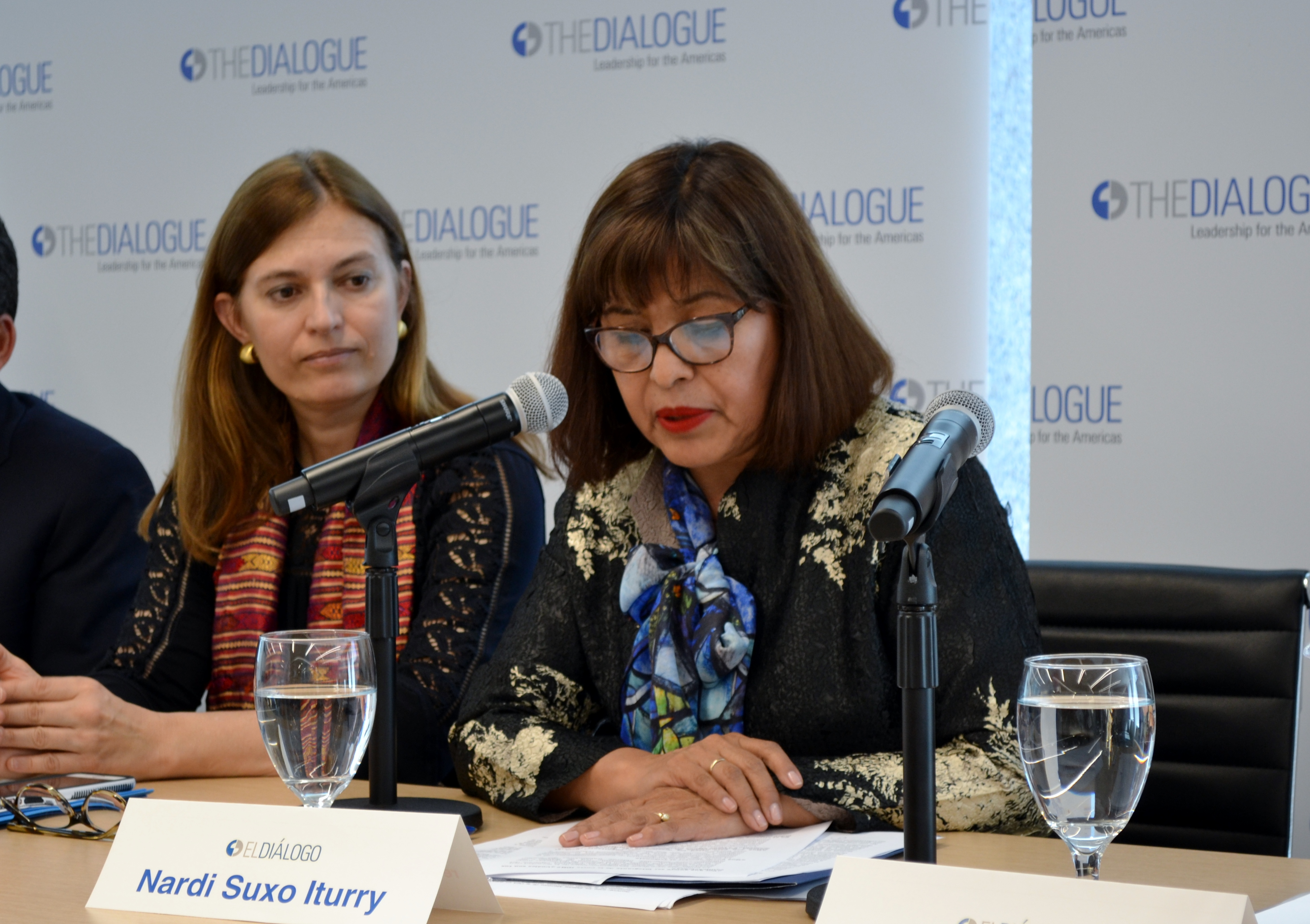
Nardi Suxo (in front of Viviana Krsticevic) as a candidate for the Inter-American Court of Human Rights in 2018

On 24 March 2015, Nardi Suxo presented a plan to the Senate for her to become the country's representative to the United Nations and other international organizations in Geneva. She formally presented her credentials as permanent representative on 13 May 2015. In 2018, she was nominated as a judge of the Inter-American Court of Human Rights. However, this bid failed after being met with strong objections from citizen activist groups and opposition parties, alleging that she had avoided taking action in some corruption cases which involved officials high in the government.

On 22 May 2019, Suxo was appointed as Bolivia's ambassador to Austria, and concurrently to Croatia, Hungary, and Slovakia, in a closed session of the Bolivian Senate. On 2 June 2019, she was sworn in as ambassador by Bolivia's foreign minister, Diego Pary Rodríguez.

She was dismissed as ambassador to these countries on 15 November 2019.
