= Ministry of Autonomies =

Government ministry of Bolivia

Ministry of Autonomy
Ministry overview
- Formed: 2009
- Dissolved: 2017
- Jurisdiction: Bolivia
- Headquarters: La Paz
- Minister responsible: Claudia Peña Claros, Minister of Autonomy
- Child agencies: Vice-Ministry of Territorial Organization; Vice-Ministry of Autonomy
- Website: Ministerio de Autonomía

The Ministry of Autonomy is a Bolivian government ministry which oversees the distribution of powers among regional bodies, including departments, municipalities, autonomous regions, and autonomous indigenous governments in Native Community Lands and indigenous municipalities. Through its Vice-Ministry of Territorial Organization, it is also responsible for delimiting boundaries between Bolivia's constituent territorial units.

The Ministry was formed through Supreme Decree 29894, issued by President Evo Morales on 7 February 2009. On 23 January 2017, the ministry was dissolved and on 26 January the new Vice Ministry of Autonomy was established as part of the Ministry of the Presidency.
