= Nemesia Achacollo =

Bolivian political and union leader

Nemesia Achacollo Tola
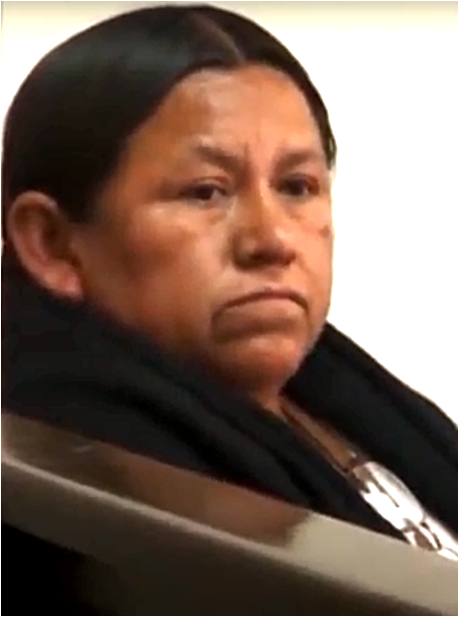
- Nemesia Achacollo in 2017

Minister of Rural Development and Lands
- In office January 2010 – August 31, 2015
- President: Evo Morales

Personal details
- Born: 18 July 1967 (age 59) Yapacaní, Santa Cruz, Bolivia
- Party: MAS-IPSP
- Spouse: Adalberto Barboza Céspedes
- Children: 3 daughters, 1 son
- Occupation: Peasant union leader

Nemesia (sometimes written as Nemecia) Achacollo Tola is a Bolivian political and union leader.

== Biography ==
She served as the Minister of Rural Development and Lands for nearly five years, and is past president of the Bartolina Sisa National Federation of Campesino Women of Bolivia. She was appointed to the Ministry by President Evo Morales in January 2010, following a long career of union leadership in her native Santa Cruz.

As Minister, she presided over the Indigenous Fund (formally the Fund for Development for Indigenous and Native People and Peasant Communities; Spanish: Fondo de Desarrollo para Pueblos Indígenas Originarias y Comunidades Campesinas; FDPPIOYCC). When allegations of widespread corruption in the disbursements from the Indigenous Fund emerged in December 2013, Achacollo was called to testify on the issue. Despite increasing calls for her to resign, she received a vote of confidence from the Plurinational Legislative Assembly in March 2015. She resigned her position as Minister on August 31, 2015, continuing to deny criminal responsibility for multi-million-Boliviano losses to the fund.

Achacollo is the second daughter of agricultural migrants to Yapacaní from Oruro. She became departmental leader of the Bartolina Sisa federation for Santa Cruz in 2001; departmental leader of the Movement for Socialism on May 1, 2003; and Executive Secretary of the national Bartolina Sisa federation in 2004.
