= Higher University of San Andrés =

University in La Paz, Bolivia

Coordinates: 16°30′17″S 68°07′48″W

Universidad Mayor de San Andrés
- Universidad Mayor de San Andrés
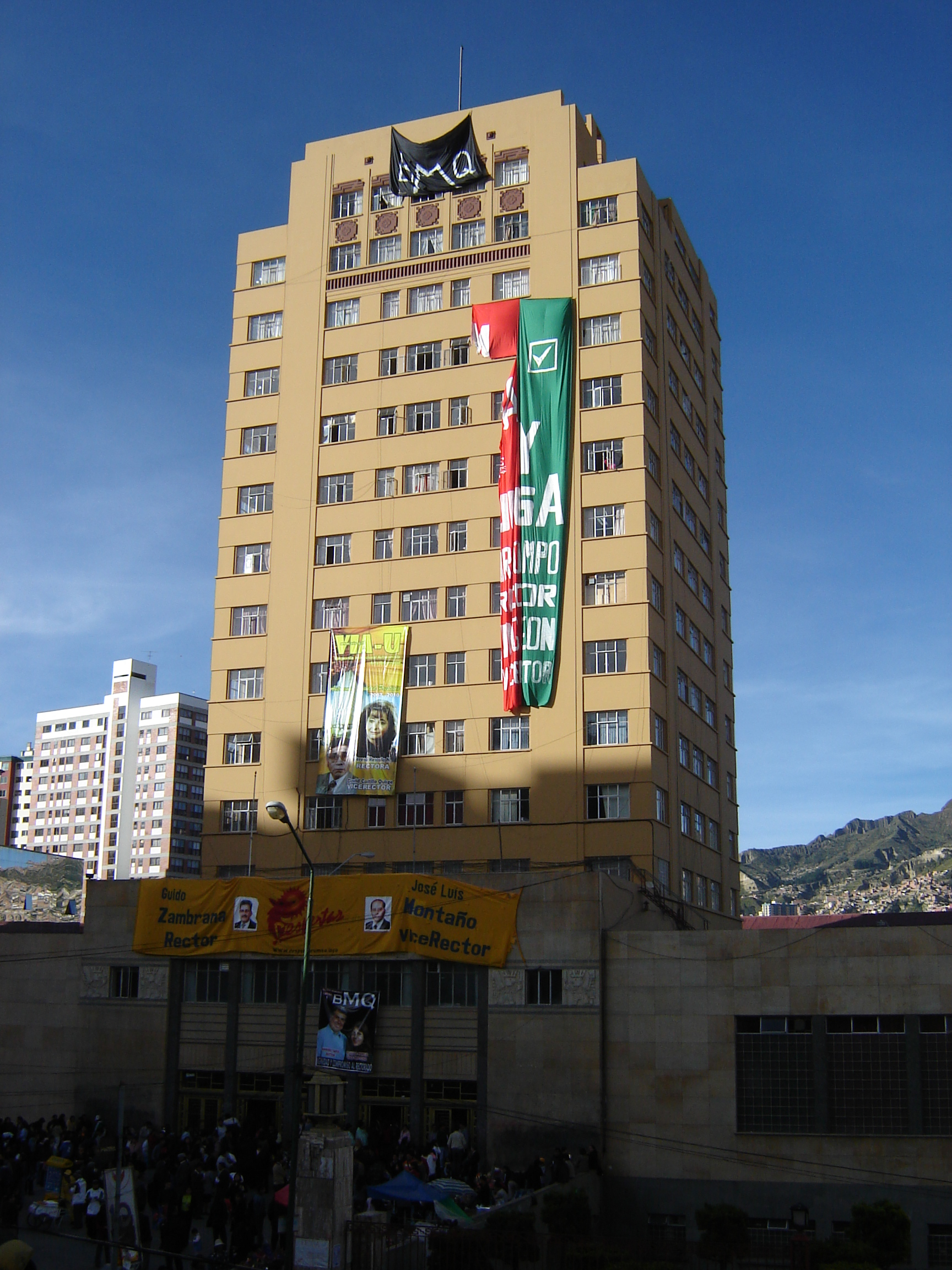
- Monoblock, the central building of the University
- Established: October 25, 1830; 195 years ago
- Vice-Chancellor: Tito Valerio Estevez Martini, M.D.
- Rector: María Eugenia García Moreno, Ph.D.
- Location: La Paz, Pedro Domingo Murillo Province, Bolivia
- Website: www.umsa.bo

University rankings

Global – Overall
- QS World: 1001+ (2021)

Regional – Overall
- QS Latin America: 128 (2021)

The Universidad Mayor de San Andrés or UMSA (Spanish: Universidad Mayor de San Andrés, lit. 'Higher University of San Andrés') is the leading public university in Bolivia, established since 1830 in the city of La Paz. UMSA is the second-oldest university in Bolivia, after the University of San Francisco Xavier de Chuquisaca (1624).

== History ==
The university was founded by Andrés de Santa Cruz by Supreme Decree on 25 October 1830. Owing to its being situated in the nation's seat of government, La Paz, the Higher University of San Andrés has since its founding influenced the social life and history of Bolivia. The university's history consists of three well-defined periods. From its inception in 1830 until a June 1930 revolution the university was official. From 1930 to the 1936 advent of the University Rectorate, position filled by Héctor Ormachea Zalles, the university was a semi-autonomous or municipal university. From then until the present, the university has been autonomous.

== Headquarters ==
The building that now hosts the university's main offices, known as the Monoblock, is located on Avenue Villazón. It was designed in 1942 by architect Emilio Villanueva and is considered an iconic example of Bolivian architecture. The building is part of a university complex inspired by Pre-Columbian architecture that never fully materialized. Construction started in 1942 and concluded on 4 July 1947. It was criticized for being the first skyscraper in the city.

It is also an epicenter of social movements and many congregate there after marching downtown.

It has 13 floors, 11 of which are used for classrooms. It contains the most complete library in the country, an auditorium that is open to the public for various events, and a semi-subterranean garden with access to the central atrium. The library was created in 1930.

Due to the high demand for rooms, various pavilions and two buildings were built in the surrounding areas. They are separated from the Monoblock by open areas and the remnants of the military college, also designed by Villanueva.

== Colleges ==
The university has the following colleges

- Law and Political Sciences
- Medicine website
- Architecture, Arts, Design, and Planning website
- Social Sciences website
- Economics and Finance
- Humanities and Education website
- Pharmaceutical and Biochemical Sciences website
- Engineering website
- Mechanics
- Pure and Natural Sciences website (which maintains the Max Schreier Planetarium and the Astronomical Observatory of Patacamaya)
- Dentistry
- Agronomy
- Earth Sciences

== Notable people ==
=== Notable alumni ===
- Eduardo del Castillo, lawyer and politician
- Griselda Delgado del Carpio, Episcopal Church bishop in Cuba and Florida
- Walter Gonzalez, civil engineer, dean of the UMSA School of Engineering, head of the Alto Beni project
- Maira Mariela Macdonal, Bolivian diplomat and one of the Vice-Presidents of the United Nations Human Rights Council
- Yola Mamani, radio personality, activist, and YouTuber
- Fernando Montes, artist, painter and filmmaker based in London
- Ana Teresa Morales, economist, professor, and politician
- Nelly Sfeir Gonzalez, activist for women's suffrage, lawyer, academic librarian, bibliographer and journal editor
- Paola Nogales-Aszarruz, biologist whose research focuses on the conservation of New World cats

=== Notable faculty ===
- Alison Spedding

=== Doctor honoris causa ===
- Gregorio Baró, Argentine scientist
- Jaime Escalante, educator
- Takaaki Kajita, Nobel Prize in Physics 2015
- Eduardo Bayro, Bolivian scientist, expert in geometric algebra
