= Herbert Salvatierra =

Bolivian politician (born 1980)

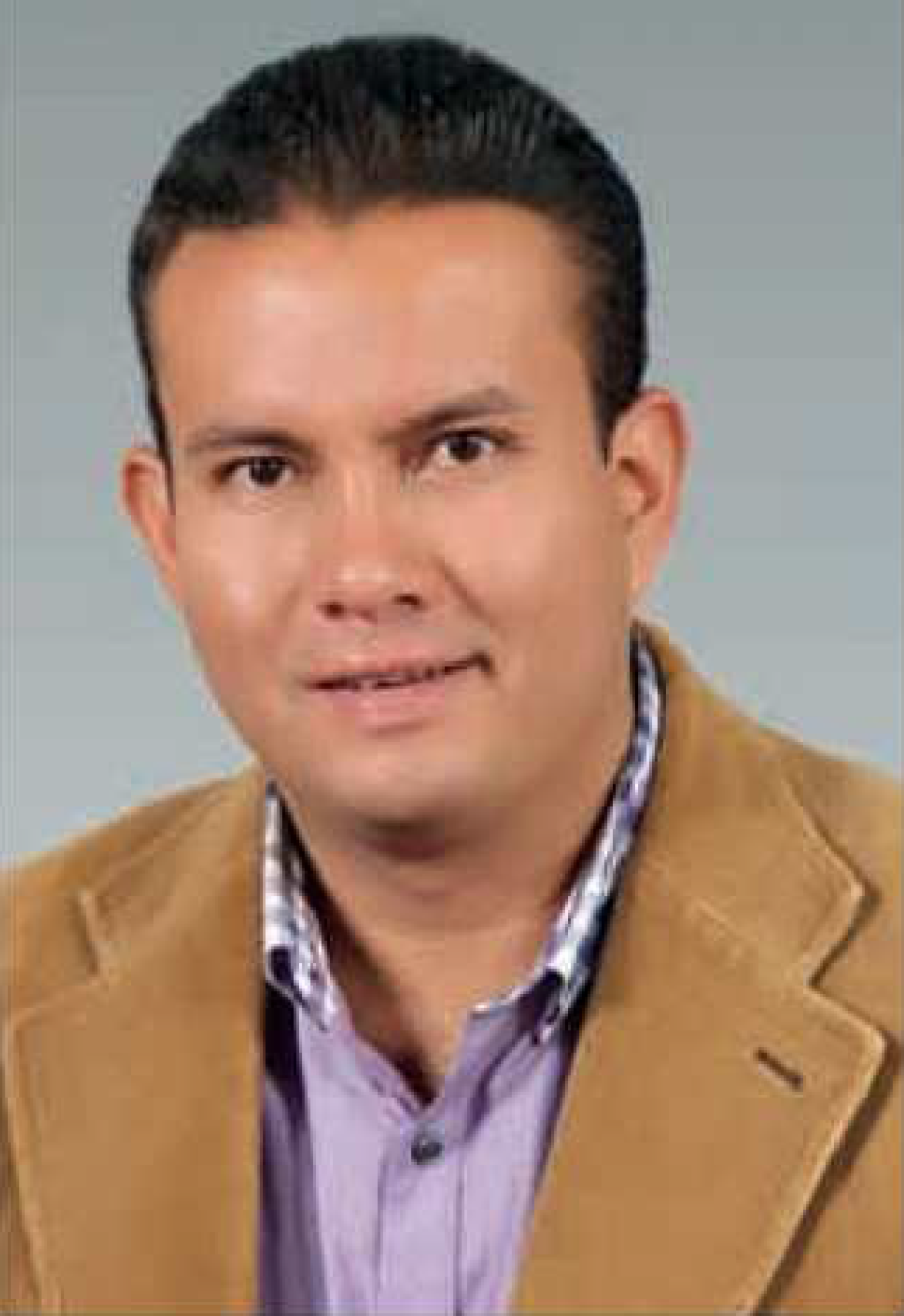
- Official portrait, 2014

Member of the Chamber of Deputies from Pando circumscription 66
- In office 19 January 2010 – 18 January 2015
- Substitute: Mariluz Gonzales
- Preceded by: Ronald Camargo
- Succeeded by: Sebastián Texeira (Note: Redistribution; circumscription 62.)
- Constituency: Bolpebra; Cobija

Personal details
- Born: Herbert Salvatierra Becerra; 20 September 1980 (age 46) Cobija, Pando, Bolivia
- Party: Integration Column
- Education: University of Valle
- Occupation: Lawyer; politician

Herbert Salvatierra Becerra (born 20 September 1980) is a Bolivian lawyer and politician who served as a member of the Chamber of Deputies from Pando, representing circumscription 66 from 2010 to 2015. Salvatierra pertains to a generation of conservative parliamentarians who entered the political arena in the heat of the conflicts of the late 2000s, agitating for regional autonomy for the eastern departments and pushing for the rejection of the new, progressive Constitution ratified during the first Evo Morales administration. Polarization over these issues reached its breaking point in Pando, resulting in the Porvenir massacre, which dealt a heavy blow to the department's opposition-controlled prefecture and civic committee. In the aftermath, Salvatierra was propelled to the presidency of the reconstituted Pando Civic Committee, remaining an ally of the department's jailed prefect, Leopoldo Fernández, for the duration of his political career.

== Early life and career ==
Herbert Salvatierra was born on 20 September 1980 in Cobija, Pando, to Hernán Salvatierra and Lady Becerra. He concluded his primary and secondary education in Cobija, graduating from the city's American Institute before enrolling in the University of Valle, where he studied law at the academy's campuses in Cochabamba and La Paz. Returning to Pando, Salvatierra gained notoriety in the department's carnival circuit, leading his own comparsa (troupe) before joining the Pando Carnival Comparsas Association, serving as the organization's treasurer, vice president, and later president between 1999 and 2005.

== Political career ==
Salvatierra entered the political field as a consultant for the Pando prefecture before being elected to the Pando Civic Committee, two institutions that, starting from the inauguration of Leopoldo Fernández as the department's first popularly-elected prefect in 2006, joined forces in support of departmental autonomy. In the country's eastern departments, the coalition between local civic committees and conservative prefects constituted the main source of opposition to the first Evo Morales administration. It was in Pando where polarization between supporters of these two groups reached its breaking point in 2008 when an armed confrontation left over a dozen dead in Porvenir. During the ensuing state of emergency, Fernández was ousted from office and arrested, and the Pando Civic Committee was dismantled; its primary leaders—including the body's president, Ana Melena de Suzuki—sought asylum in Brazil.

The dramatic fall of Pando's highest political leaders catapulted Salvatierra to the top of the opposition in the department. He was elected acting president of the civic committee when the organization's remaining members reconstituted the body following the lifting of the state of emergency. With Salvatierra at its helm, the Pando Civic Committee launched a reinvigorated bid to stymie the national government's agenda, campaigning for the "no" vote in that year's constitutional referendum. Nearly sixty percent of Pandinos voted to reject the 2009 Constitution, though the national results ultimately saw the document's passage into law.

With the campaign underway for the 2009 general election, Salvatierra was brought on to run for a seat in the Chamber of Deputies. He was elected to represent circumscription 66 on behalf of the National Convergence (CN) alliance, a grouping that, in Pando, was led by Roger Pinto and Leopoldo Fernández, among others. The former prefect remained regionally influential despite his incarceration, founding from prison the Integration Column (CI) civic group, of which many of Pando's opposition parliamentarians, including Salvatierra, became members. Though CI aligned itself with Democratic Unity for the 2014 general election, Salvatierra was not nominated for reelection. Upon the conclusion of his term, he returned to Cobija to dedicate himself to municipal matters, serving as the city's secretary of economic development during the mayoral administration of Luis Gatty Ribeiro. During the gubernatorial bid of Carmen Eva Gonzales as part of an alliance headed by CI, Salvatierra was nominated for a seat in the Pando Departmental Assembly. However, the party's third-place finish precluded him from attaining the position.

== Electoral history ==
Electoral history of Herbert Salvatierra
Year	Office	Party	Alliance	Votes			Result	Ref.
Year	Office	Party	Alliance	Total	%	P.	Result	Ref.
2009	Deputy	Independent	National Convergence	11,313	53.22%	1st	Won	
2021	Assemblyman	Integration Column	Democratic Integration Community	6,046	19.45%	3rd	Lost	(Note: Presented on an electoral list. The data shown represents the share of the vote the entire party/alliance received in that constituency.)
Source: Plurinational Electoral Organ | Electoral Atlas

Civic offices
Preceded by Ana Melena de Suzuki	President of the Pando Civic Committee; 2008–2009	Succeeded by Henry Carvallo
Chamber of Deputies of Bolivia
Preceded by Ronald Camargo	Member of the Chamber of Deputies from Pando circumscription 66; 2010–2015	Succeeded by Sebastián Texeira
