= 2008 Bolivian vote of confidence referendum =

A vote of confidence in President Evo Morales in the form of a referendum was held in Bolivia on 10 August 2008. The vote was held to determine whether Morales, Vice President Álvaro García Linera, and eight out of nine departmental prefects should stay in office. Morales received more than 67% support and six of the eight prefects were returned. The prefects of Cochabamba Department and La Paz Department were defeated and had to face re-election.

== Background ==
The referendum was initially suggested by Morales in December 2007, but was rejected by the opposition at the time. However, the opposition-controlled Senate brought back the suggestion following their victory in the Santa Cruz autonomy referendum on 4 May 2008, with Morales agreeing to hold the vote.

The recall election would be deemed successful if the percentage voting in favour of the recall exceeded the percentage of voters that originally voted for the person. For Morales and Linera, there would have to be more than 53.74% (their margin in the 2005 presidential election). The same rules apply for the governors, but their margins are between 48% and 38% in La Paz Department which makes their recall much easier to accomplish. If the recall is successful then fresh elections would be held. Morales has stated that if he stays in office, he will use the referendum result as a springboard for more reforms – for instance, setting a date for the constitutional referendum which would grant more rights to Bolivia's poor indigenous population. If he loses, he said he would go back to farming coca.

Polls in May 2008 showed Morales easily defeating the recall.

Following autonomy referendums held in the second quarter of 2008 in Santa Cruz, Beni, Pando and Tarija, the governors of these four states initially refused to take part in the recall referendum unless the referendum complied with the new autonomy statutes, which the Supreme Electoral Court considers to be invalid; they pushed for early elections to be held instead. Nonetheless, the governors later agreed to participate. However, there were still obstructive measures from these four departments a few days before the referendum.

The recall referendum did not apply to the governor of Chuquisaca Department, as Savina Cuéllar was just elected very recently in June 2008. Cuéllar was a member of the Bolivian Constituent Assembly for Morales' Movement for Socialism, but ran for governorship of Chuquisaca as the candidate of the opposition Interinstitutional Committee Alliance, winning with 55% to MAS' Wálter Valda's 45%. The gubernatorial election was held after the previous governor, David Sánchez of MAS, resigned (against the wish of his party) due to violent protests.

Shortly before the election, the rules were changed, though the legality of this move remains in doubt; under the new rules, the governors will be removed from office if over 50% of voters recall them, effectively raising the threshold required.

== Results ==
Summary of the 10 August 2008 Bolivian recall referendum results
Position	Party	Candidate	Votes against recall	% against recall	% threshold	Result
President; Vice President	Movement Toward Socialism	Juan Evo Morales Ayma; Álvaro García Linera	2,103,732	67.41%	53.7%	Survived
Prefect of Beni Department	PODEMOS	Ernesto Suárez	64,866	64.25%	44.64%	Survived
Prefect of Chuquisaca Department	Allianza Comité Interinstitucional	Savina Cuéllar	Not voting			
Prefect of Cochabamba Department	Nueva Fuerza Republicana	Manfred Reyes Villa	195,290	35.19%	47.64%	Recalled
Prefect of La Paz Department		José Luis Paredes	362,214	35.48%	37.99%	Recalled
Prefect of Oruro Department		Alberto Luis Aguilar	84,364	50.86%	40.95%	Survived
Prefect of Pando Department	PODEMOS	Leopoldo Fernández	14,841	56.21%	48.03%	Survived
Prefect of Potosí Department		Mario Virreira	171,629	79.08%	40.69%	Survived
Prefect of Santa Cruz Department	Autonomy for Bolivia	Ruben Costas	451,191	66.43%	47.87%	Survived
Prefect of Tarija Department	Civic Committee	Mario Cossío	78,170	58.06%	45.65%	Survived
Source: National Election Court of Bolivia Archived 2009-01-08 at the Wayback Machine
