= 2008 Bolivian political crisis =

Political crisis between departments demanding autonomy and national government

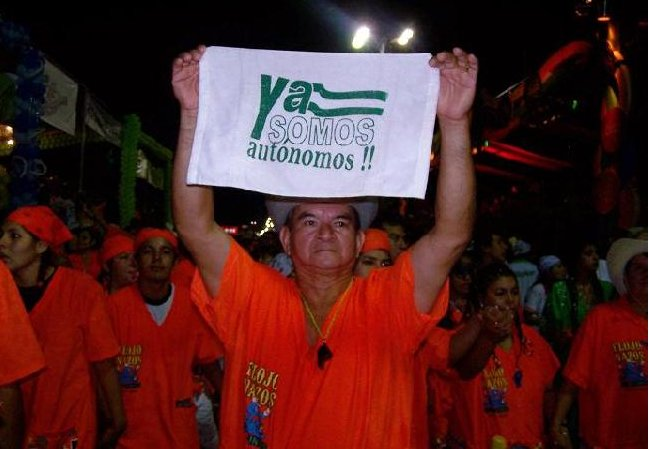
- Protesters supporting the autonomy of Santa Cruz. Autonomy movements also took place in other Eastern Bolivian departments.
Date	August 2008 – October 2008
Location	Santa Cruz Department and other eastern Bolivian ones
Result	Referendum held, crisis ends

Belligerents
Bolivia: Armed Forces of Bolivia; Morales supporters	(Bolivia) Media Luna: Santa Cruz; Pando; Beni; Tarija

Commanders and leaders
(Bolivia) Evo Morales	Rubén Costas

The 2008 Bolivian political crisis saw protests against President Evo Morales and calls for greater autonomy for the country's eastern departments. Demonstrators escalated the protests by seizing natural gas infrastructure and government buildings. In response, supporters of the national government and its reform of the constitution, mobilized across these regions.

Violence between supporters of Morales and opponents, which reached its peak in the Porvenir massacre on September 11, resulted in at least 15 deaths.

== Protests begin ==
On August 19, the eastern departments of Santa Cruz, Beni, Pando, Tarija, and Chuquisaca called strikes and protests in opposition to central government plans to divert part of the national direct tax on hydrocarbons towards its Renta Dignidad pension plan. Brief clashes occurred in the Santa Cruz de la Sierra, capital of Santa Cruz, between police and armed youths enforcing the strike. In Tarija protesters seized and occupied government buildings. In response to the unrest Morales ordered the Bolivian Army to protect oil and gas infrastructure in the five departments.

The governors of the departments warned on September 3, 2008, that if the government didn't change its course that the protests could lead to a cut-off of natural gas exports to Argentina and Brazil. They also threatened setting up roadblocks in the five departments in addition to road blocks set up on roads leading to Argentina and Paraguay. The governors also demanded government troops withdraw from Trinidad, the capital of Beni department, following clashes between MPs and protesters trying to seize facilities of the National Tax Service in the city. President Morales accused the governors of launching a "civil coup" against his government.

== Violence escalates ==
Protesters caused the explosion of a natural gas pipeline on September 10, 2008, according to the head of Bolivia's state energy company. He called the attack a "terrorist attack" and said it result in 10% cut in exports to Brazil. President Morales sent additional troops to the region following the attack. The next day clashes erupted between supporters and opponents of the government in the northeastern town of Cobija, capital of Pando department, resulting in 20 deaths. Morales said his government would be patient with the unrest but warned that "patience has its limits, really." A spokesman for Morales said the unrest was opening the way to "a sort of civil war."

The leader of the national opposition, Jorge Quiroga, accused the central government of organizing militias to retake the city of Cobija. Central government work had also ceased while American Airlines was suspending flights to the airport. Peasant supporters of Morales were also threatening to encircle Santa Cruz. Venezuelan President Hugo Chávez warned that if Morales was overthrown or killed Venezuela would give a "green light" to conduct military operations in Bolivia. Bolivia's army said it rejected "external intervention of any nature" in response to Chávez. Morales ruled out the use of force against protesters, calling for talks with opposition leaders.

The Governor of Tarija department, Mario Cossío, went to La Paz on September 12, 2008, to hold negotiations representing three other opposition governors who had rejected talks with the central government. Morales said he was open to dialogue not only with the governors but with mayors and different social sectors. Before the meeting Mario Cossio called for dialogue saying "The first task is to pacify the country, and we hope to agree with President Morales on that. Our presence has to do with that clear will to lay the foundations and hopefully launch a process of dialogue that ends in a great agreement for national reconciliation." Vice President Álvaro García declared a day of national mourning for 20 people killed in Pando most of whom were pro-Morales farmers shot dead by people the government claims were associated with the opposition.

== Pando state of emergency ==
Bolivian authorities declared a state of emergency in Pando which began at midnight on September 12, 2008. During the state of emergency, constitutional guarantees are suspended, private vehicles without authorization are banned from the streets, groups are not allowed to meet; bars, restaurants and discos must close at midnight, and residents are prohibited from carrying firearms. Morales said martial law was not needed anywhere else in the country.

Following the declaration of a state of emergency, Bolivian troops took control of the airport in Pando's capital, Cobija, and prepared to retake the city. Morales accused the governor of Pando of orchestrating "a massacre" of farmers supporting Morales. Pando Governor Leopoldo Fernández rejected the accusation, saying "They've accused me of using hit men, when everyone knows those socialist peasants, those fake peasants, were armed." In a speech in Cochabamba, Morales condemned the opposition governors, saying they were "conspiring against us with a fascist, racist coup," and said they were "the enemies of all Bolivians." While promising to adopt a constitution opposed by the governors Morales said Bolivia's "democratic revolution" had to be seen through saying "We have always cried 'fatherland or death'. If we don't emerge victorious, we have to die for the country and the Bolivian people." Morales also said he would not hesitate to extend the state of emergency to other opposition-controlled departments. Rubén Costas, the governor of Santa Cruz, belittled the chances of a breakthrough in talks adding that "if there is just one more death or person wounded, any possibility of dialogue will be broken."

Opposition protest leader and pro-autonomy businessman Branko Marinkovic announced on September 14, 2008, that the demonstrators he led would be removing their road blocks as "a sign of good will" to allow dialogue to prosper and calling on the government to end "repression and genocide in the department of Pando." Troops who had landed at Cobija also began patrolling the streets before dawn and began uncovering more dead bodies from the September 11 clash in Pando between Morales supporters and opposition protesters. Alfredo Rada, government minister for Pando, referring to casualty figures, said "We are nearing the 30 mark." An aide to the opposition governor in Pando denied the army was in control of the departmental capital. Troops were also hunting for Pando governor Fernández with orders to arrest him.

A spokesman for Morales said blockades remained on the highway and said "an armed group" had set fire to the town hall in Filadelfia, a municipality near Cobija. The Pando government spokesman said the citizens of Cobija did not want the Army to enter the city, and that they were not going to follow martial law.

Bolivia's army arrested as many as 10 people for alleged involvement in the deadly clashes. Leopoldo Fernández was also taken into custody by the armed forces on September 16, to be flown to La Paz to face accusations that he hired hitmen to fire on pro-government supporters. He was charged with committing genocide.

The U.S. began evacuating Peace Corps volunteers from Bolivia and organized at least two evacuation flights in response. In spite of the arrest, opposition governors agreed to talks, conditioned on anti-Morales protesters ending occupations of government buildings. Matters up for discussion include the opposition drive for more autonomy for their provinces and a larger share of state energy revenue. Talks were expected to begin on Thursday. The army also professed its support for Morales.

Morales appointed Navy Rear Admiral Landelino Bandeiras as the replacement for the governor of Pando September 20, 2008. Difficulties were reported in the peace talks by presidential spokesman Ivan Canelas, who said the position of the opposition governors could hinder peace talks and condemned the "lack of political will of these authorities to backup the efforts being made by the central government to preserve peace and national unity."

Supporters of Morales have threatened to storm the city of Santa Cruz if the talks should fail.

On September 25, 2008, Morales rejected autonomy proposals by the Eastern provinces, putting the talks on hold. On October 20, 2008, Morales and the opposition agreed to hold the referendum on January 25, 2009, and early elections in December 2009; Morales in turn promised he would not run again in 2014 after his likely reelection in 2009, despite being allowed to do so under the new constitution.

== Diplomatic response ==
Accusing the United States of supporting the opposition governors and attempting to overthrow his government, Morales declared the United States Ambassador to Bolivia Philip Goldberg persona non grata, and ordered him to leave the country. The U.S. responded by expelling Bolivia's ambassador in Washington. U.S. State Department spokesman Sean McCormack expressed regret at the diplomatic fallout saying it will "prejudice the interests of both countries, undermine the ongoing fight against drug trafficking and will have serious regional implications." President Morales said he does not want to break diplomatic ties with the U.S. but said the actions of the ambassador were "very serious", claiming he met with provincial leaders and instigated the unrest. Before his departure the American ambassador warned Bolivia that it would face "serious consequences" and had "not correctly evaluated" the retaliation from Washington.

Venezuela's President Hugo Chávez ordered the U.S. ambassador in Caracas Patrick Duddy to also leave saying it was in part out of solidarity with Bolivia. Chávez also said he was recalling Venezuela's ambassador to the U.S. until a new government takes office. Chávez accused the United States of being involved in the unrest saying "The U.S. is behind the plan against Bolivia, behind the terrorism."

State Department spokesman Sean McCormack said the expulsions by Bolivia and Venezuela reflect "the weakness and desperation of these leaders as they face internal challenges." Morales responded that the act was "not of weakness, but of dignity," and was about freeing Bolivia from "the American Empire."

=== Other responses ===
==== National governments ====
- Brazil: The Foreign Ministry said Brazil's government was taking the necessary measures to guarantee gas supplies in the country. It also expressed "grave concern" at the unrest in Bolivia deploring the outbreak of violence and attacks on state institutions and public order. Aides to President Luiz Inácio Lula da Silva said high-ranking members of his government and Argentina's were ready to try to negotiate a deal between Morales and his opponents.
- Ecuador: President Rafael Correa said both Bolivia and Venezuela had sufficient reason to expel the U.S. ambassadors saying Ecuador would expel someone if they interfered in his country's internal affairs.
- Honduras: President Manuel Zelaya put off a ceremony at which the U.S. ambassador would present a letter with his diplomatic credentials "in solidarity with Bolivian President Evo Morales." A few days later he told the envoy to present his credentials as ambassador later in the week.
- Nicaragua: President Daniel Ortega announced his support for Bolivia's expulsion of the U.S. ambassador. He later rejected an invitation to meet with U.S. President George W. Bush out of "solidarity" with Morales.

==== Intergovernmental organizations ====
- Secretary General of the Andean Community of Nations Freddy Ehlers condemned the violence in Bolivia and called for dialogue between the government and opposition.
- European Union: In a statement the EU urged "all parties to take steps to rapidly establish" talks to stop the situation getting worse, offered to mediate between opposing parties, and expressed regret over attacks on aid projects.
- UN: Secretary-General Ban Ki-moon "rejects the use of violence as a means to advance political ends and joins others, including the Secretary General of the Organization of American States, José Miguel Insulza, and Bolivia's Conference of Catholic Bishops, in calling for dialogue, urgently, to seek consensus on the pressing issues affecting the Bolivian people," according to a statement issued by the UN.
- President of Chile and President pro tempore of the Union of South American Nations Michelle Bachelet summoned an emergency meeting of heads of state in Santiago de Chile to analyze the political situation in Bolivia, scheduled for Monday September 15. That meeting ended with backing for the Bolivian leader. On September 24, 2008, Unasur agreed to send a special commission to investigate the violence in Pando.

== See also ==
- Bolivian gas conflict, 2003–2006 social conflict stemming from issues around gas taxation and privatization
- Bolivian autonomy referendums, 2008
- 2019 Bolivian protests
- 2019 Bolivian political crisis
