= Estanis Condori =

Bolivian politician (born 1978)

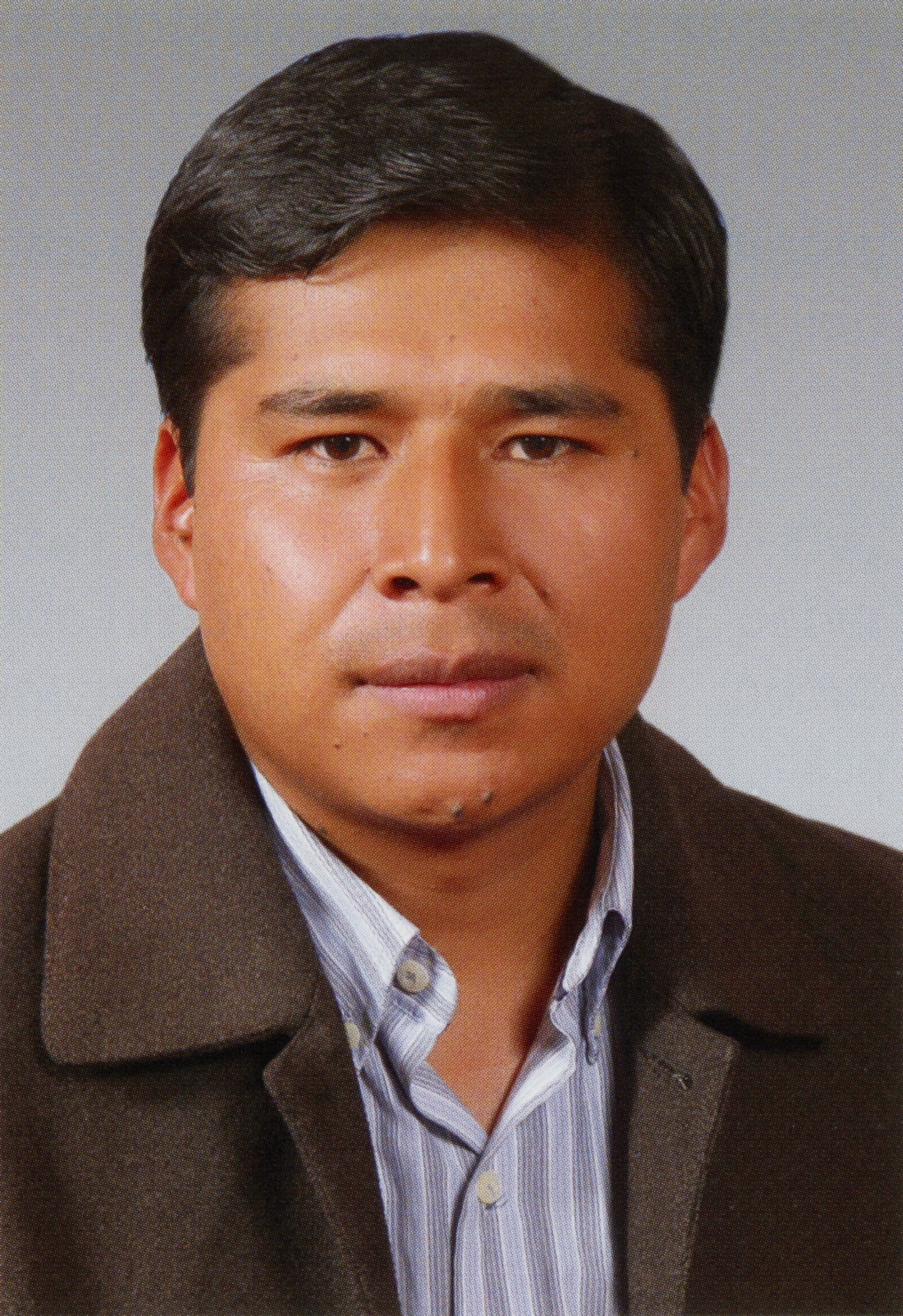
- Official portrait, 2014

Member of the Chamber of Deputies from Potosí's 43rd constituency
- In office 19 January 2010 – 18 January 2015
- Substitute: Felipa Huanca
- Preceded by: Froilán Condori
- Succeeded by: Ascencio Lazo (Note: Redistribution; constituency 36.)
- Constituency: Campos; Nor Chichas; Nor Lípez; Quijarro

Personal details
- Born: Estanis Condori Cárdenas; 15 April 1978 (age 48) Collpa Uno, Potosí, Bolivia
- Party: Movement Toward Socialism (until 2025)
- Other political affiliations: Popular Organization Movement (2025–2026)
- Education: Tomás Frías University
- Occupation: Politician; trade unionist
- Website: Official blog

Estanis Condori Cárdenas (Note: In this Spanish name, the first or paternal surname is Condori and the second or maternal family name is Cárdenas.) (born 15 April 1978) is a Bolivian politician and trade unionist who represented Potosí's 43rd constituency in the Chamber of Deputies from 2010 to 2015.

Raised in a peasant family in rural Nor Chichas Province, Condori worked as a migrant laborer in his youth and studied municipal administration in Potosí. He assumed local positions in his home region, being district deputy mayor from 2002 to 2003 and part of the vigilance committee from 2003 to 2004. He also became involved in the peasant labor movement, leading the local union in Collpa Uno in 1997, the provincial trade union center from 2007 to 2009, and the South Potosí Peasant Federation from 2009.

Condori held party positions in the Movement Toward Socialism as its provincial president from 2005 to 2006 and head of its court of honor. During the Constituent Assembly, he advised the party's departmental delegation. He was elected to parliament in 2009, representing multiple provinces in rural Potosí. Following his term, Condori sought the nomination for governor of Potosí in the 2015 election, but was not selected. He ran again for governor under a different party in 2026 but was disqualified by the electoral court.

== Early life and career ==
=== Early life and education ===
Estanis Condori was born on 15 April 1978 in Collpa Uno, an agrarian town near Cotagaita in the Nor Chichas Province of Potosí Department. He is the eldest of four children born to trade unionist Lucio Condori Villca and Marina Cárdenas Tolaba.

Like many peasants in rural south Potosí, Condori performed migrant labor in his youth. From the age of 10, alongside his father, he did farm work in places like Bermejo, the cotton fields of Santa Cruz, and Argentina during the grape and tomato harvests. He attended primary through intermediate and started secondary in Collpa Uno, and received his baccalaureate in Tupiza. He studied municipal administration at Tomás Frías University in Potosí.

=== Career and trade unionism ===
Condori began participating in peasant leadership from a young age. During his second year of intermediate, his father fell ill, and Condori assumed his position in the local agrarian union. By 1997, he had risen to the post of general secretary of the Collpa Uno trade union. He also took part in municipal leadership training between 2000 and 2005, as the leader of a group of promoters.

He served as district deputy mayor from 2002 to 2003 and sat on the vigilance committee from 2003 to 2004. The latter body provided a forum for local leaders to engage with and oversee municipal authorities. Condori described dealing with these officials as "difficult". He recalled how the subprefect would summon authorities with little advance notice. "If anyone was late, he would penalize them. You had to go work on his fincas". Following the events of Black October in 2003, Condori and others held a cabildo that resolved to "strip those people of their offices" and installed a new subprefect.

Rising through the ranks of trade union leadership, Condori served two terms as executive secretary of the provincial trade union center in Nor Chichas Province from 2007 to 2009, before becoming general secretary of the South Potosí Peasant Workers' Federation. He is a representative of the Unified Trade Union Confederation of Peasant Workers of Bolivia at the national level.

== Chamber of Deputies ==
=== Election ===
Labor activism brought Condori into conflict with his region's local governments, which he disparaged as neoliberal and conservative. He joined the Movement Toward Socialism (MAS) and was president of the party in Nor Chichas Province from 2005 to 2006. During the Constituent Assembly, he staffed for the MAS legislative caucus. He later served as president of the party's court of honor in Potosí Department.

In 2009, representatives of his province nominated Condori to contest a seat in the Chamber of Deputies. He ran in circumscription 43 of Potosí, which comprised the provinces of Campos, Nor Chichas, Nor Lípez, and Quijarro. Like most MAS candidates in the rural highlands, Condori triumphed in a landslide. He received nearly tenfold the votes of the runner-up, notching margins exceeding ninety percent in places like Cotagaita. His vote share falls to 56.28 percent, however, if the high proportion of invalid/blank votes are taken into account.

=== Tenure ===
Condori took office on 19 January 2010. He led the MAS caucus in Potosí from 2010 to 2011. During this period, the department's delegation presented 115 bills for projects in the region – significantly more than all other delegations. He also remained active as a party organizer, helping the MAS take control of the local government in Cotagaita Municipality by winning the mayoralty and a supermajority on the municipal council. In 2013, Potosí's MAS lawmakers nominated Condori to lead the party's legislative caucus, but Flora Aguilar was chosen instead. The following year, Condori was elected president of Potosí's parliamentary delegation. He was not nominated for reelection, and left office on 18 January 2015.

=== Commission assignments ===
- International Relations and Migrant Protection Commission
  - International Economic Relations Committee (2010–2011)
  - International Relations, Migrant Protection, and International Organizations Committee (2011–2012)
- Education Commission
  - Education Committee (Secretary: 2012–2014)
- Plural Economy, Production, and Industry Commission
  - Agriculture and Animal Husbandry Committee (2014–2015)

== Later political career ==
Following the end of his term, Condori sought the MAS nomination for governor of Potosí in the 2015 election. He competed against a crowded field of candidates considered by CODELCAM, the regional body of MAS-aligned social movement organizations. Finally, on 2 December 2014, President Evo Morales announced that fellow lawmaker Juan Carlos Cejas had been selected over Condori as the party's nominee. During the gubernatorial administration of Jhonny Mamani, he served as a functionary in the governor's office.

The MAS split in 2023–2024 between Morales supporters and those of his successor, Luis Arce. For the 2025 election, Condori supported Morales's attempt to run again for president. Following the electoral collapse of the MAS, many former members remained in politics under different parties. In late 2025, the Popular Organization Movement (MOP), led by former senator Edwin Rodríguez, nominated Condori to contest the 2026 gubernatorial election in Potosí. However, in January 2026, the Supreme Electoral Tribunal revoked MOP's registration for failing to meet the three-percent electoral threshold the previous year. The ruling disqualified all of MOP's candidates and barred them from seeking office under a different party.

== Electoral history ==
Electoral history of Estanis Condori
Year	Office		Party	Votes			Result	Ref.
Year	Office		Party	Total	%	P.	Result	Ref.
2009	Deputies	C-43	Movement Toward Socialism	23,297	82.51	1st	Won	
2026	Governor		Popular Organization Movement	Disqualified			Lost	
Source: Plurinational Electoral Organ | Electoral Atlas

Chamber of Deputies of Bolivia
Preceded by Froilán Condori	Member of the Chamber of Deputies from Potosí's 43rd constituency 2010–2015	Succeeded by Ascencio Lazo
