= Cochabamba social unrest of 2007 =

2007 social unrest in Bolivia

Social unrest in Cochabamba involved violent clashes between supporters and opponents of Cochabamba Prefect Manfred Reyes Villa in the departmental capital city of Cochabamba, Bolivia, reaching their peak on January 11 and 12, 2007. The policies of the President Evo Morales and the agenda of his Movement towards Socialism (MAS) party in the Constituent Assembly were opposed by politicians in other political parties, notably Reyes Villa. The prefect's opposition to Morales' policies angered the President's supporters, and early in 2007 demonstrations in Cochabamba escalated into violent clashes between Reyes Villa's civic movement and urban and rural social movements who called for his ouster. During the violence, coca farmer Juan Tica Colque (age 38) and the young student Christian Urresti (17) were killed. Coca farmer Luciano Colque (48) was mortally wounded by blows from civic movement protesters and died of cranial trauma on February 27. Some 200 people were wounded in the clashes.

== Background ==
=== Reyes Villa and Morales ===
The pro-autonomy Prefect Manfred Reyes Villa of Cochabamba Department (which is "a geographic and cultural bridge between the pro-autonomy lowlands and Morales' Andean base") was a major opponent of Evo Morales' policies. A previous presidential candidate with the New Republican Force, Reyes Villa was "widely considered to harbor national political ambitions," and did in fact run for the presidency in 2009. While Reyes Villa was one of Morales' most outspoken political opponents, Morales also is very popular with many in the region, where he led the protests of coca leaf growers as the head of Cochabamba's coca growers confederation.

=== Constituent Assembly: The two-thirds controversy ===
In December 2006, Reyes Villa joined the national right-wing parties and the prefects of the media luna in opposition to the MAS' proposed rules for voting in the Constituent Assembly then rewriting the Constitution of Bolivia. Reyes Villa maintained that each of the new charter’s articles should be written by two-thirds of the assembly’s delegates, while Morales (whose MAS party holds just over half of the seats) held that the document should be written by a simple majority of the delegates with only the final draft being held to a two-thirds nationwide vote.

=== Autonomy ===
A July 2006 referendum, held in tandem with the elections for the Constituent Assembly, asked Bolivian voters whether their departments should become autonomous. The Yes vote won in the four eastern departments of the media luna, but the No vote won in the remaining five departments including Cochabamba. The right-wing prefects of the media luna came to be the central opposition to Evo Morales' administration.

In December 2006, Reyes Villa called for Cochabamba to hold a second referendum to give Cochabamba autonomy from the central government. Reyes Villa claimed that the measure was only defeated before because the Morales government misled voters, saying "People thought autonomy meant you would need a passport to travel from one province to another."

== Demonstrations mount ==
Reyes Villa's political resistance to Morales' policies caused demonstrators demanding his resignation to pack the tree-lined central plaza of the city of Cochabamba several times in December 2006 and January 2007. In early January 2007 his opposition led the "peasant movements’ supporters of President Morales to block roads and move into Cochabamba province attacking elected authorities."

== Tear-gas and Fires ==
Demonstrators set fires in Cochabamba.

Angry over Reyes Villa's resistance to Morales' policies on January 10, 2007 demonstrators took control of the regional capitol building. When police tried to disperse the crowd by using tear-gas, the demonstrators set fire to its historic heavy wooden doors and allowed the blaze to spread "charring furniture and destroying some government records." Two nearby parked cars were also set on fire. Protestors also threw stones at the police and rolled flaming tires into the nearby police station. Bolivian media reported that 22 were injured in the protest, several of them journalist covering the event. Morales' cabinet called the police response excessive, and fired the newly appointed state police commander who had only assumed the office two hours beforehand. Government Minister Alicia Munoz, said "we will not permit any more acts of violence or acts of repression against the social sectors who, in this case, were demonstrating peacefully." She asserted that Reyes Villa had no right to call out the police and that he had done so as part of a conspiracy, "When a minister is in charge, a prefect can’t give orders… There can be no repression; you can’t use the police to provoke social movements."

== Resignation demanded, violence escalates ==
Police face off against demonstrators in Cochabamba.

On January 11, 2007 in an unsuccessful attempt to "force Reyes out of office and instill a 'revolutionary committee' headed by an ex-guerrilla leader once known as Comandante Loro -- Commander Parrot", demonstrators opposed to Reyes Villa "Wielding guns, sticks and machetes" fought with the prefect's supporters (who were "largely middle-class, mixed-race residents fed up with what many view as the president's snubbing of their needs as he exalts Bolivia's long-ignored indigenous masses"). Morales sent in police and soldiers to end the violence.

Over 450 people were wounded and two were slain in the violence, while a third was mortally wounded and died in February. According to the Cochabamba Human Rights Commission (Spanish: Comisión de Derechos Humanos de Cochabamba): at least 400 suffered blows from sticks, stones, fists, or other objects; 36 more suffered severe wounds from such blows; and 11 were wounded by gunshots.

Juan Ticacolque Machaca (On January 11, he was widely misidentified as Nicómedes Gutiérrez), a 34-year-old banana farmer, was fatally shot in the Plaza de las Banderas and carried to the central September 14 Plaza, where his body was exhibited. Alex Rosales, who was carrying two guns, was arrested on January 11 and later charged with his murder, for which he was sentenced to 14 years in prison.

Christian Urresti Ferrel, a 17-year-old civic protester, was beaten to death at the intersection of Mayor Rocha and Baptista streets. Witnesses testified that he had assisted someone wounded by campesino protesters before being attacked himself. There has been speculation that Ticacolque's dying or dead body, which was carried through the same intersection, may have helped to incite the violence against Urresti.

Luciano Colque, a 45-year-old coca farmer who joined the protests on January 10, was beaten severely by civic protesters on January 11, and received care at Hospital Viedma. He died of cranial trauma early in the morning of February 27. Colque was the father of seven children and lived in the Chapare.

Prosecutors investigated 12 instances of violence from January 11, including the deaths of Ticacolque and Urresti. Only one resulted in a conviction, that of Alex Rosales.

== Aftermath ==
Recriminations and political rivalry continued between Morales and Reyes Villa. Morales blamed the bloodshed on Reyes Villa accusing him of supporting "separatism in Bolivia". Morales called for calm and for his supporters not to seek revenge for the slain demonstrator, saying "It's not about humiliating anyone, or about winning against anyone, it's about finding solutions through dialogue." Morales accused Reyes Villa of corruption and violating human rights. He proposed a "people's law" that "would allow him to call for a public vote to remove Reyes Villa." Reyes Villa declared that he would not resign. Reyes Villa accused Morales of undermining democracy, saying "They're trying to impose a totalitarian regime. Democracy has taken a blow in Cochabamba."

Despite the calls of protesters, Reyes Villa remained Prefect until he was defeated in the August 2008 recall referendum. He was the leading opposition candidate in the December 2009 presidential elections, but fled the country immediately thereafter to avoid facing indictments for corruption.

Morales' call for calm did prevent further violence, but the passion of supporters of his policies was still high. This can be seen in a statement by Omar Fernandez, a coca growers' leader, "If Bolivia's elites want more people to die, then more people will die. But we want a united Bolivia, not one divided like this country's oligarchy wants." The situation reminded the prefect of La Paz, José Luis Paredes, of the days of the Luis García Meza Tejada military dictatorship (when his opposition was told to carry their wills with them), Luis Paredes said "Things are so bad now that the prefects have to carry their wills under their arms."

== On the central government and the police ==
The Morales administration's critique of the police during these events is seen as am mark of further polarization in the country. The forces of the military are increasingly seen as loyal only to the central government, who enacted "broad concessions granted to the armed forces, including [in 2006] the largest salary raise given to any group for the military officer corps." That same year no raises were given to local police. The prefects of the regions have "been reaching out to the police, both out of a true need to address citizen security issues, and as a way to curry their favor to strengthen their positions." In the past the prefects always held control over local police action, but as they were (until 2005) appointed by the President, this had never been an issue before.
