= Roger Pinto =

Bolivian politician (1960–2017)

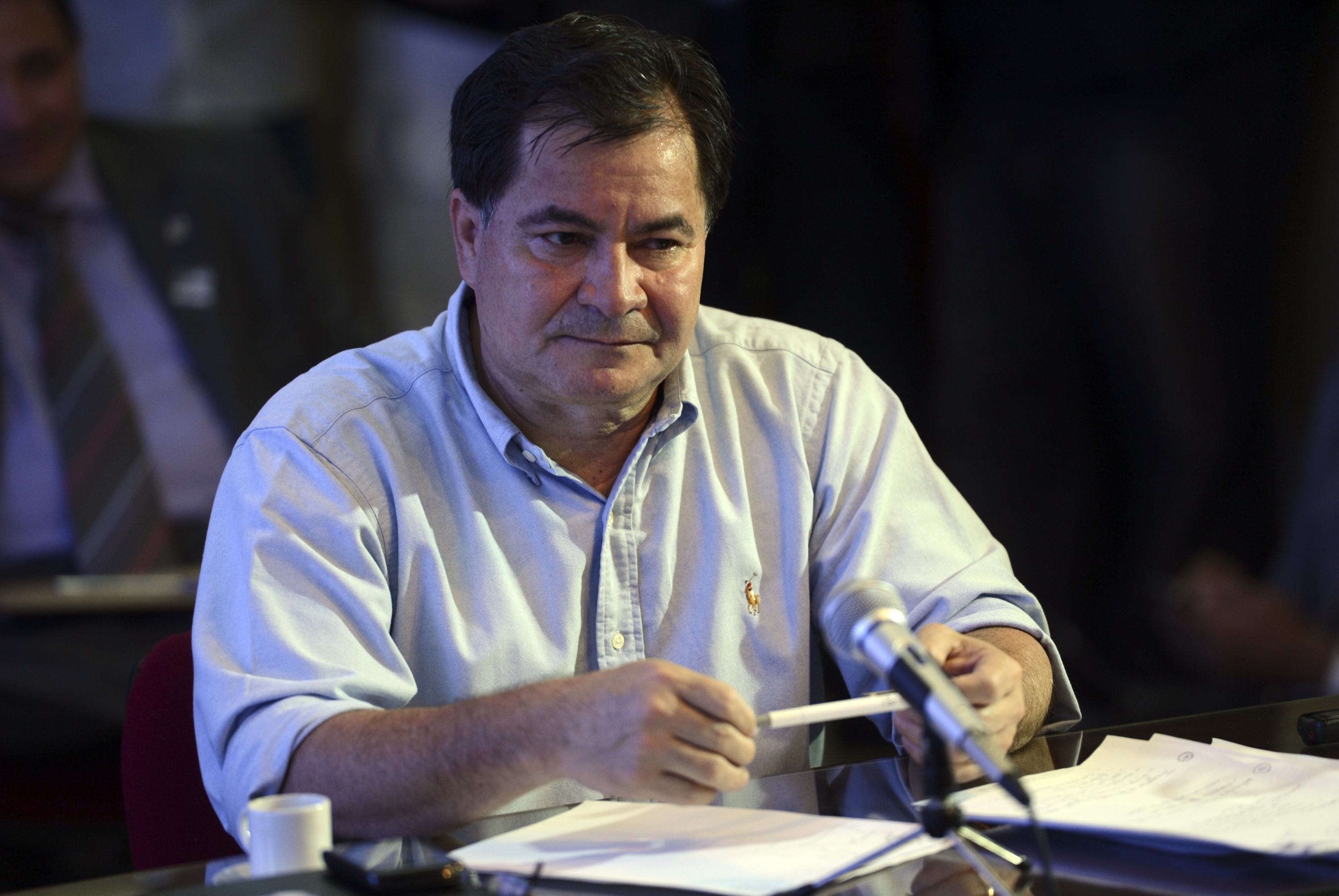

Senator for Pando
- In office 2005–2012

Member of the Chamber of Deputies
- In office 1997–2002
- Constituency: Pando

Personal details
- Born: Roger Pinto Molina; 23 April 1960 Santa Rosa de Yacuma, Bolivia
- Died: 16 August 2017 (aged 57) Brasília, Federal District, Brazil
- Cause of death: Plane crash
- Party: ADN (1997–2009); PPB-CN (2009–2013)

Roger Pinto Molina (23 April 1960 – 16 August 2017) was a Bolivian right-wing politician.

== Life and career ==
Pinto was born in Santa Rosa de Yacuma, Beni. He was elected to the Chamber of Deputies in 1997, from the single-member constituency 67 in Pando (covering areas in the provinces Nicolás Suárez, Manuripi and General Federico Román) as a Nationalist Democratic Action (ADN) candidate. His alternate was Edgar Balcázar Velasco. He has also been the Prefect of Pando.

As of 2002, Pinto served as Director of the Baptist Church, Technical Assistant of the Central Bank of Bolivia, president of the Cooperativa de Teléfonos, Cobija, member of the national directorate of the Telephone Cooperatives Federation (FECOTEL), president of the Electoral Court of Pando, president of the Asociación de Ganaderos, Pando, municipal council in the city of Cobija and departmental executive secretary of ADN. Pinto is also a major land-owner, owning a 3,269 hectares of land in El Lago and El Atajo (both areas in the municipality of Porvenir).

In 2005, Pinto was elected to the Senate as a Podemos candidate from Pando. He served as the head of the Podemos faction in the Senate. He was reelected to the Senate in 2009, as a candidate of Plan Progress for Bolivia – National Convergence. His alternate is Linda Flor Brasilda Villalobos.

=== Accusations and failed asylum ===
Pinto was accused of involvement in the September 11, 2008 massacre in Porvenir. The Bolivian government accused Pinto of having, during his tenure as prefect of Pando, sold twenty-two hectares of land to the department of Pando for the 'ridiculous' amount of US$17,515.

As of 2012, he sought refuge in the Brazilian Embassy in La Paz. He was granted asylum in Brazil but was not given safe conduct by Evo Morales Government to leave Bolivia.

Pinto left the Brazilian Embassy Friday 23 August 2013 with the help of people from the Embassy. This help was allegedly granted by the indirect influence of the Brazilian foreign minister Antonio Patriota. Patriota resigned from office because of his action 27 August 2013.

=== Death ===
On 12 August 2017, Pinto was severely injured when the small plane that he was piloting crashed shortly after taking off from an airport in Luziânia. He ultimately died on 16 August 2017 at the age of 57 from injuries sustained in the plane crash.
