= Leopoldo Fernández =

Bolivian politician (born 1952)

Leopoldo Fernández Ferreira

President of the Senate of Bolivia
- In office August 1999 – August 2001
- Preceded by: Wálter Guiteras Denis
- Succeeded by: Enrique Toro Tejada

Prefect of Pando
- In office 2006 – 16 September 2008 (under Federal arrest)
- Succeeded by: Landelino Rafael Bandeira

Personal details
- Born: May 22, 1952 (age 74)
- Party: Social and Democratic Power (PODEMOS)
- Profession: Politician

Leopoldo Fernández Ferreira (born 22 May 1952) is a Bolivian politician. A member of Social and Democratic Power (PODEMOS) Fernández was Prefect (Governor) of the northern Bolivian department of Pando from 2006 to 2008.

Fernández was the first elected Prefect of Pando, an office that had previously been appointed by the President. He won the elections in December 2005. Fernández survived the August 2008 vote of confidence referendum, though he had over 14,000 votes against his governorship.

Fernández's government strongly backed autonomy for the department, in alliance with other governors of the eastern "media luna" (half-moon, so known for their combined geographic shape) provinces Santa Cruz, Beni, Tarija. Nationwide referendums on autonomy held on July 2, 2006, were approved in all four departments. A second referendum to approve a statute of autonomy was held by each department in mid-2008, despite being declared illegal by the National Electoral Court in March. Left-wing and pro-Morales social movements boycotted the votes. Pando's referendum, held on June 1, 2008, won 82% approval among those who voted, but 46.5% of the registered electorate did vote, the highest abstention rate in the four departments holding such referendums.

Prefecto Leopoldo Fernandez was arrested on 16 September 2008 on charges of Acts against the state of emergency. Additionally, other charges for "genocide" are expected from Evo Morales' government for allegedly organizing the Porvenir Massacre, an ambush in which 15 peasants were killed and 37 wounded at El Porvenir on 11 September 2008. Landelino Rafael Bandeira Arze was appointed his interim successor by President Evo Morales and assumed office as prefect on 20 September 2008.

Prosecutors (of the Ministerio Público) presented indictments against 26 people, including Fernández, for the Porvenir Massacre before the Sixth Sentencing Tribunal (Tribunal Sexto de Sentencia) on 12 October 2009. There were repeated and extensive delays in the prosecution of the Porvenir trial. While in April 2010, the trial was scheduled for June of that year, it did not get under-way until 2015. After several years in the San Pedro prison in La Paz, Fernandez was released to house arrest in February 2013. After the examination of evidence in the second half of 2015, closing arguments in the trial were held in March 2016.

While in prison, Fernández was a candidate for Vice President with the Plan Progress for Bolivia – National Convergence alliance. In the December 2009 election, his slate placed second, winning 26.59% of the vote.

== See also ==
- 2008 Bolivian autonomy referendums
