= Santa Cruz Youth Union =

Crucenist Youth Union Union Juventil Cruceñista
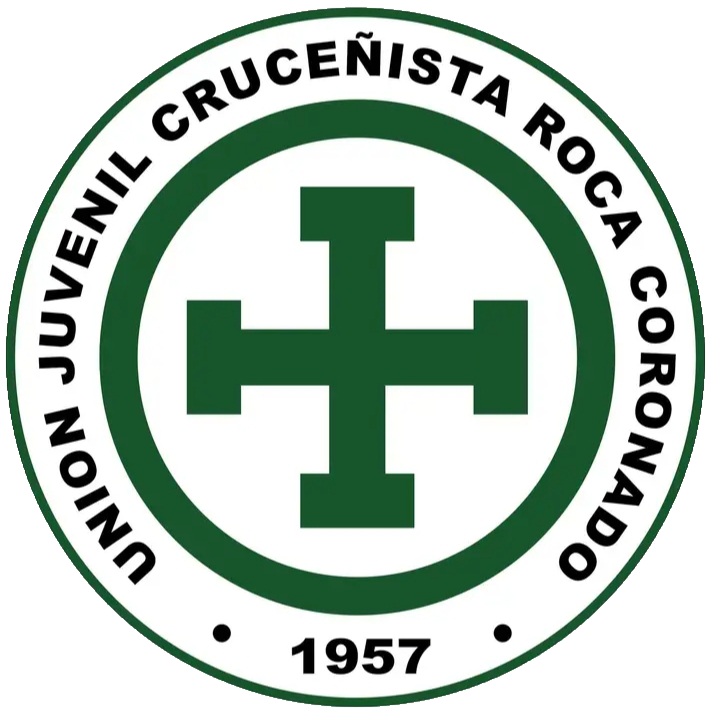
- President: Ernesto Vaca Vilasboas
- Founded: 7 October 1957
- Ideology: Fascism; Falangism
- Political position: Far-right
- Religion: Catholicism
- National affiliation: Comité Pro Santa Cruz
- Slogan: "Siempre libres cruceños seamos" ("Always free Santa Cruzians we'll be")

Party flag
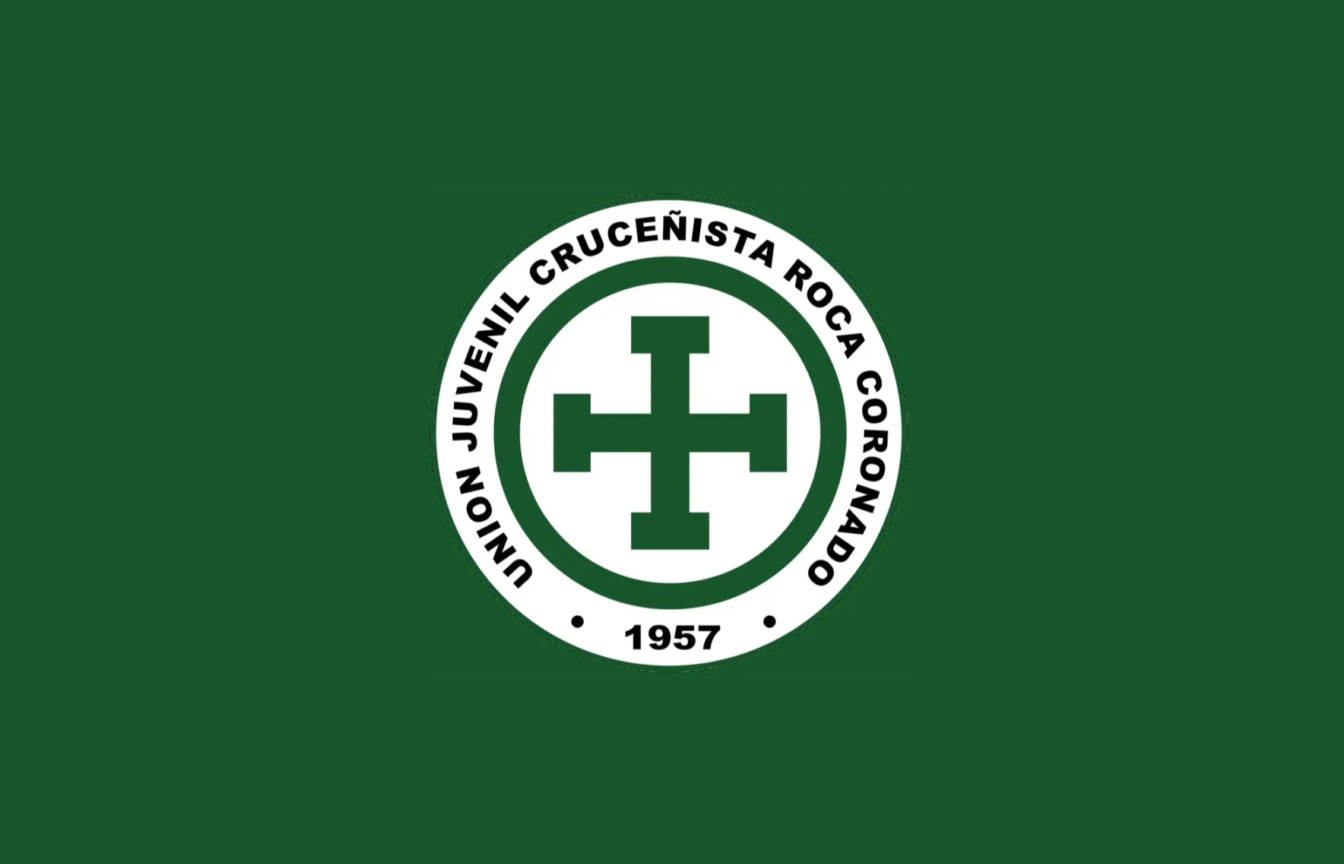

Website
- https://ujcsantacruz.blogspot.com/

The Santa Cruz Youth Union (Unión Juvenil Cruceñista) (UJC) is a far-right movement based in Santa Cruz, Bolivia. Founded in 1957 as an arm of the Pro Santa Cruz Committee (Comite Pro Santa Cruz), the UJC has recently become the subject of controversy and accusation concerning its activities in support of the Santa Cruz autonomy movement in opposition to the government of Evo Morales and his MAS political party.

== History ==
The organization was founded in 1957 by Carlos Valverde Barbery, leader of the Bolivian Socialist Falange, a falangist party. According to its founder, "the Union of Crucenist Youth was created to be the "armed arm" of the Pro-Santa Cruz Committee, taking charge not only of the street struggle but also of popular indoctrination and military support to the committee. » In 1971, it took part in Hugo Banzer's coup d'état. Carlos Valverde Barbery was appointed Minister of Health.

Claiming a membership of more than two thousand, the UJC has violently enforced general civic strikes called for by the Pro Santa Cruz Committee, intimidated and assaulted leftist political opponents, and provided security for the 4 May Santa Cruz Autonomy referendum, participating in violent clashes the day of the vote. Two members of the UJC were arrested and accused of plotting to assassinate Morales on 20 June 2008, when encountered by police in possession of a rifle, scope, and ammunition in Santa Cruz prior to the president's flight arrival. Some sources claimed that they were captured at the airport, but others located the suspects in a popular market. Nevertheless, the prosecutor dismissed the case and they were both released shortly afterwards.

== Ideology and characteristics ==
Being a Falangist is still a condition for joining the Union of Crucenist Youth. Known for its violent activism, the organization is considered a paramilitary group by the International Federation for Human Rights (FIDH). Its activists are generally from the bourgeoisie.
