= List of governors of departments of Bolivia =

Each of the nine departments of Bolivia have a governor

The departmental governors of Bolivia (Spanish: Gobernadores de Bolivia) are the highest executive authorities of the executive bodies of each of the nine departments (highest-ranking autonomous territorial entities) that make up Bolivia .

The government of the department resides in the governor (until 2010 called prefect). The term of office lasts for a period of five years.

== History ==
On 1 January 1825, the commander-in-chief of the United Liberating Army of Peru, General Antonio José de Sucre, appointed General José Miguel Lanza, by decree, as "governor and commander-in-chief" of the province of La Paz. Lanza was to take possession once he captured the city of La Paz, which at that time was controlled by royalists. Later, when Sucre was in charge of the provinces of Upper Peru, the title became "president and commander-in-chief", sometimes also referred to as "president and military commander," or frequently simply as "president." This title remained in use until the beginning of Sucre's second term.

=== Prefects (1826–2010) ===
General Sucre, the Protector of the Republic of Bolívar and head of the Bolivian Executive Branch, signed Law No. 30 of January 23, 1826 (Law of Political Division), which established the new administrative system, adopting the French model. The titles of president and commander-in-chief were replaced by the title of "prefect" of departments.

The prefects of each department were appointed by Supreme Decree by the president until 2005, when in the elections of that year, in addition to electing the president, the prefects were elected by popular vote for the first time in history. They can only vote directly and universally.

==== Prefects and commanders-in-chief ====
With the constitutional reform of 1995, the prefect was to exercise the function of the general command of the departmental police, holding the title of "prefect and general commander".

=== Management (2005–2010) ===
In the April 2005 elections, a strong opposition to the Morales government was consolidated in the subnational elections, forming a "half-moon" shape, as the results showed five departments with opposition seats and four with government seats. Following the current Constitution, on 4 April 2010, the prefectures of all Bolivian departments were replaced by "Autonomous Departmental Governments," departmental executive bodies according to the constitutional text. The first governors were elected in the subnational elections of 4 April 2010 and took office on 31 May. Six governors were government supporters and three were opposition supporters.

When they began their efforts, there was still almost a month to go before the promulgation of Law No. 031 of July 19, 2010 (Framework Law of Autonomies and Decentralization "Andrés Ibáñez").

Mario Cossío, of Camino al Cambio, who had been elected prefect of Tarija in 2006, was re-elected as governor. He was then removed from office by the Tarija Departmental Legislative Assembly for alleged corruption on 16 December 2010, subsequently tried, and fled into exile until 2019. Then-President Evo Morales de facto appointed Lino Condori Aramayo, a MAS-IPSP assembly member from Yunchará, as interim governor, thus breaking the department's autonomous protocols for gubernatorial succession; initially, Lino Condori was to serve as interim or temporary governor until elections were held, but he later extended his term until the 2015 subnational elections.

Ernesto Suárez, of Beni First, who had also been elected Prefect of Beni in 2006, was re-elected as Governor. He was also removed from office for alleged corruption on 16 December 2011, by the Beni Departmental Legislative Assembly, the Beni Departmental Public Prosecutor's Office, and the Ministry of Institutional Transparency and the Fight Against Corruption. He was replaced by Haisen Ribera Leigue of the MNR. However, elections were held in 2013 to retain someone in office, and Carmelo Lenz Fredericksen won, remaining in office until the next election in 2015.

=== Management (2015–2021) ===
The Governors for the 2015–2020 term were elected in the subnational elections of 29 March 2015. Again, 6 governors were from the ruling party and 3 from the opposition.

At the end of the 2019 post-election political crisis, in addition to President Evo Morales, four of the six pro-government governors resigned: Alex Ferrier of Beni was replaced by Fanor Amapo, Iván Canelas of Cochabamba was replaced by Esther Soria, Victor Hugo Vásquez of Oruro was replaced by Zenón Pizarro and Juan Carlos Cejas of Potosí was replaced by Alejo Véliz. Esteban Urquizu had announced his resignation but did not follow through. All the interim governors remained members of the Movement for Socialism.

On 20 January 2020, the Interim Constitutional Government of Jeanine Áñez enacted a law extending the mandate of all authorities of the executive and legislative bodies at the central level of the State and of the Autonomous Territorial Entities until elections are held.

Urquizu left his post, only officially resigning on 25 March of that year. Efraín Balderas was appointed on 1 April.

The Oruro Departmental Legislative Assembly dismissed Pizarro and appointed Edson Oczachoque on 31 May.

For the general elections of that year, the Governor of Pando, Luis Adolfo Flores, ran for Senator, was elected, and handed over the governorship to Vice Governor Paola Terrazas Justiniano on 1 November. With Flores' resignation, none of the governors elected by the Movement for Socialism remained in office, leaving those of the opposition intact.

On 10 February 2021, Eloy Calizaya was appointed Governor of Potosí, replacing Veliz.

Subsequently, the TSE set March 7, 2021 as the date for the subnational elections, which will extend for the period 2021–2026.

=== Management (2021–2026) ===
New governors were elected in the subnational elections of 7 March 2020.

Four departments also held a second round of elections, which was scheduled for 11 April of the same year. It meant that Bolivia was the first country to hold two general elections during the COVID-19 pandemic.

This time, 3 governors were from the ruling party and 6 were from the opposition.

On 28 December 2022, the Governor of Santa Cruz, Luis Fernando Camacho, was arrested in connection with the "Coup I" case and transferred to the city of La Paz. On 29 December, Vice Governor Mario Aguilera refused to initiate the gubernatorial succession process, a position also shared by the Secretary of Justice, Efraín Suarez. On 30 December, Camacho was sentenced to four months in San Pedro prison, thus preventing him from exercising his duties as governor, although he retained the title.

The current governors were elected in the 2026 Bolivian regional elections.

== Current governors ==
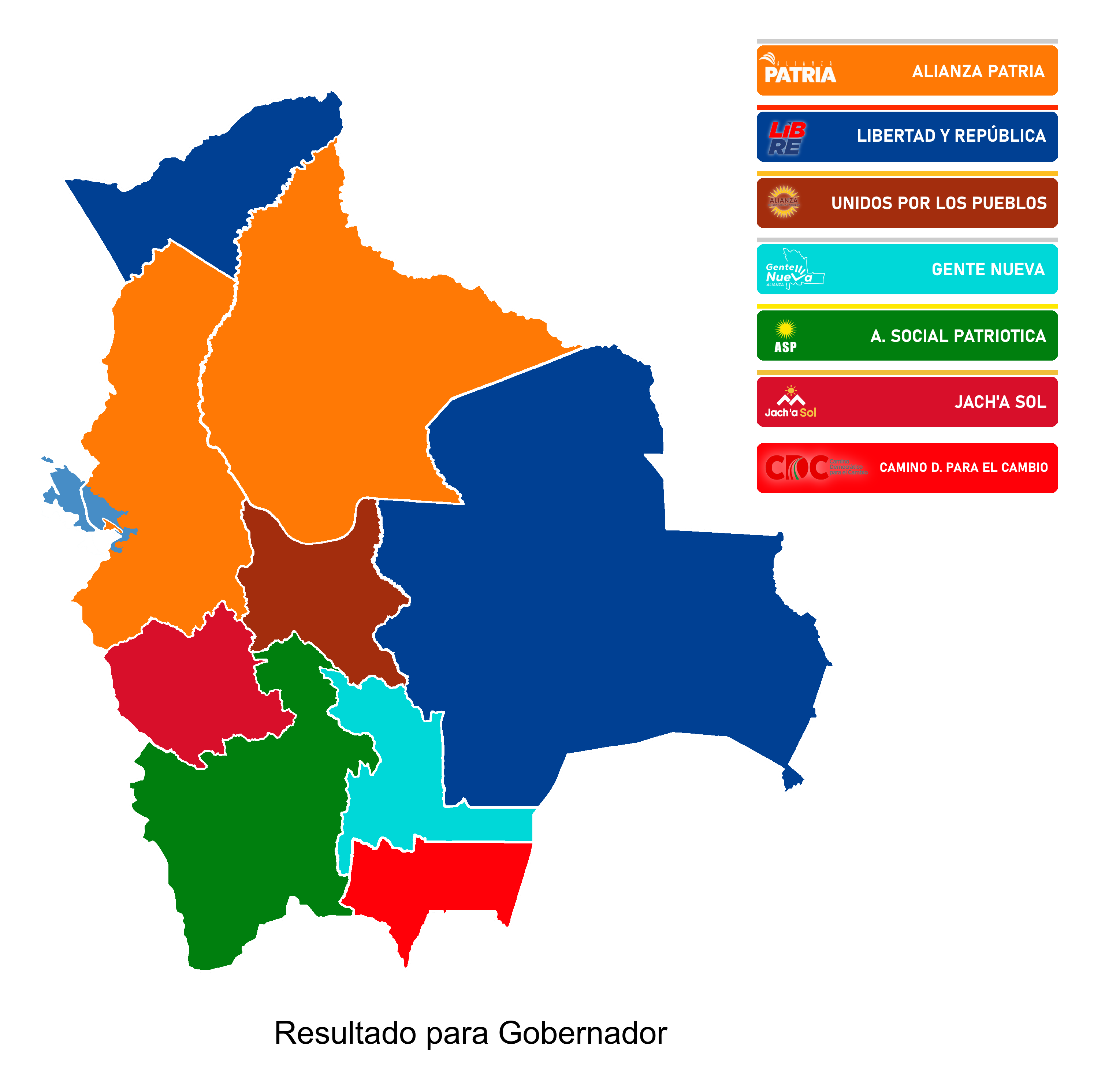
Departments governed by political parties after the 2026 elections.

Department	Governor	Party (Alliance)	Start of current term
Beni	Jesús Egüez Rivero	Alianza Patria	4 May 2026
Chuquisaca	Luis Ayllon	Alianza Gente Nueva	4 May 2026
Cochabamba	Leonardo Loza	Alianza Unidos Por los Pueblos	3 May 2026
La Paz	Luis Revilla	Alianza Patria	4 May 2026
Oruro	Edgar Sánchez	Jach'a Sol	4 May 2026
Pando	Gabriela de Paiva	Libertad y República	5 May 2026
Potosí	René Joaquino	AS	4 May 2026
Santa Cruz	Juan Pablo Velasco	Libertad y República	4 May 2026
Tarija	María René Soruco	CDC	4 May 2026

== Lists of Prefects and Governors by Department ==
- Governors of Beni
- Governors of Chuquisaca
- Governors of Cochabamba
- Governors of La Paz
- Governors of Potosí
- Governors of Oruro
- Governors of Pando
- Governors of Potosí
- Governors of Santa Cruz
- Governors of Tarija
