= Ana Lucía Reis =

Bolivian politician

Ana Lucía Reis (born July 17, 1970, in Porvenir) is a Bolivian politician, Mayor of Cobija, and owner of an ecological hotel. She is affiliated with the Movement for Socialism (MAS). She started her career as a Congressional deputy representing the Revolutionary Nationalist Movement, elected in 2002, but changed to the MAS in 2005 and was re-elected for this party. She won the 2010 mayoral election in Cobija with 53.7% of the vote, the highest vote for any of the mayors in the main cities.
