= 2016 Bolivian constitutional referendum =

- 21 February 2016
- Do you agree with the reform of Article 168 of the Political Constitution of the State so that the president and the vice president of the state can be re-elected twice continuously?

Results
Choice	Votes	%
Yes	2,546,135	48.70%
No	2,682,517	51.30%
Valid votes	5,228,652	95.22%
Invalid or blank votes	262,267	4.78%
Total votes	5,490,919	100.00%
Registered voters/turnout	6,502,069	84.45%
- Results by region

A constitutional referendum was held in Bolivia on Sunday, 21 February 2016. The proposed constitutional amendments would have allowed the president and vice president to run for a third consecutive term under the 2009 Constitution (which would be a fourth consecutive term, including their pre-2009 term). The proposal was voted down by a 51.3% majority.

== Background ==
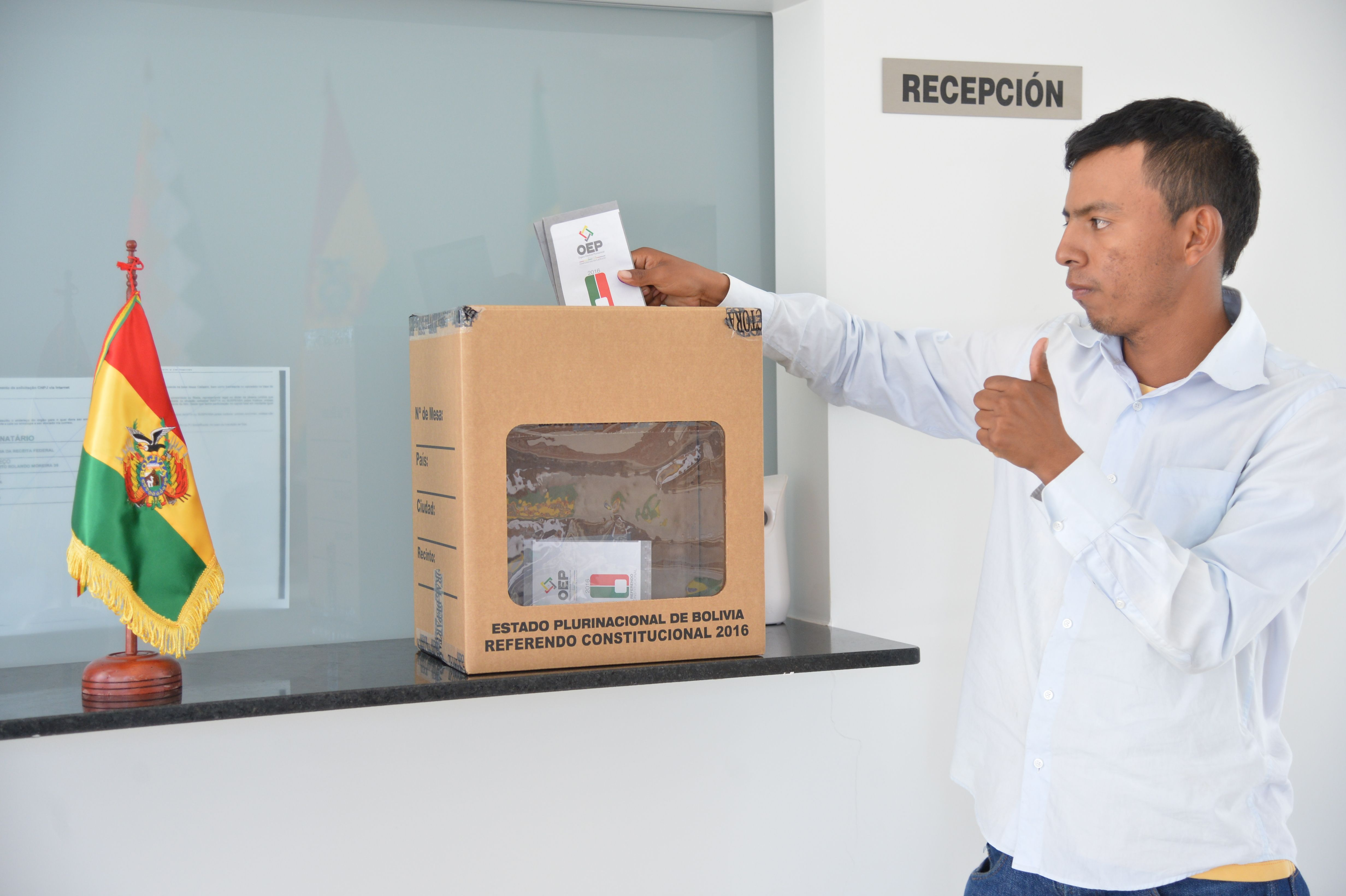
A referendum voter

Article 168 of the 2009 constitution allows the President and Vice-President to put themselves forward for re-election only once, limiting the number of terms to two.

On 17 September 2015, CONALCAM, a citizen's group friendly to the governing party, the Movement for Socialism (MAS), and president Evo Morales, sponsored an effort to amend this article. That day, Morales turned 9 years, 8 months, and 24 days without interruption as head of State, surpassing Andrés de Santa Cruz.

9 days later, on 26 September, a combined session of the Plurinational Legislative Assembly, aproved the possibility to amend the Constitution by a vote of 112 to 41. On October 6, Bolivia's Constitutional Supreme Court admitted the petition to consider it's relevance, and in 15 days, corrected and aproved it. Almost inmediately, Bolivia's Plurinational Electoral Organ defined the referendum's question and voting date.

Law 757, which convenes the February referendum, was passed by a vote of 113 to 43, and promulgated on 5 November 2015.

On 8 December 2015, opposition leader, and the second most voted Presidential candidate in the 2014 general election, Samuel Doria Medina, questioned how fast the referendum was aproved and how little time it allowed for campaigning. He then called for the referendum to be suspended, and put those economic resources on healthcare.

Bolivian elections are conducted under an "act of good governance," which prohibits electoral propaganda in the days before an election, and tightly regulates motorized transport. It was illegal to buy or consume alcohol for 48 hours prior to the referendum to ensure voters took note of their decision.

A successful 'yes' vote would have allowed President Evo Morales and Vice President Álvaro García Linera to run for a fourth term in office in 2019. Morales had already been elected three times. The first time, in 2006, is not counted legally as it was before the two term limit was introduced by the 2009 constitution.

== Disinformation campaigns ==
In the run-up to the referendum, opponents claimed that Morales had fathered an out-of-wedlock child named "Ernesto Fidel Morales" after Ernesto "Che" Guevera and Fidel Castro. The story was "mostly fake news." There had been a relationship, but never a child, and the woman had borrowed a child from her aunt to present to the press in support of the false allegations. Referendum supporters claim that the allegations hurt Morales in the polls.

== Opinion polls ==
Pollster	Date of publication	Yes	No	Undecided
IPSOS	26 October 2015	49%	39%	11%
Mercados y Muestras	5 December 2015	40%	54%	6%
IPSOS	29 December 2015	45%	50%	5%
MORI	11 January 2016	41%	37%	19%
IPSOS	13 January 2016	38%	44%	14%
Captura Consulting	10 February 2016	44%	41%	15%
MORI	12 February 2016	40%	40%	11%
IPSOS	12 February 2016	40%	41%	15%
Mercados y Muestras	14 February 2016	28%	47%	25%

== Results ==
Choice	Votes	%
For	2,546,135	48.70
Against	2,682,517	51.30
Total	5,228,652	100.00
Valid votes	5,228,652	95.22
Invalid/blank votes	262,267	4.78
Total votes	5,490,919	100.00
Registered voters/turnout	6,502,069	84.45
Source: OEP

== Aftermath ==
In January 2017, Morales expelled Foreign Relationships Minister David Choquehuanca from his cabinet for suggesting he should be MAS Presidential candidate after the referendum's results.

In September 2017 the Movement for Socialism appealed to the Plurinational Constitutional Court to abolish term limits. In November the court ruled in favour of their abolition, citing the American Convention on Human Rights. The ruling allowed Morales to run for re-election in the 2019 elections.
