= 2008 Bolivian autonomy referendums =

Stages of approval or rejection of Autonomic Statutes in four Bolivian Departments

Referendums on departmental autonomy statutes were held in four departments of Bolivia—Beni, Pando, Santa Cruz, and Tarija—in May and June 2008. These four departments, known as the Media Luna, voted in favor of autonomy in the June 2006 elections. The National Electoral Court had blocked the referendums, along with the proposed referendum on Morales's new constitution. The referendums were also unconstitutional, as the constitution in force at the time had no provisions for departmental autonomy. Under the Framework Law on Autonomy, passed in 2010, the autonomy statutes must be harmonized with the 2009 Constitution before being enacted.

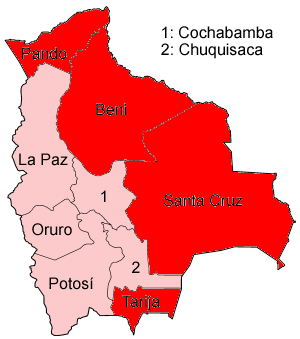
Departments of Bolivia

The first autonomy referendum was held in Santa Cruz Department on 4 May 2008. Autonomy referendums were held in Beni Department and Pando Department in Bolivia on 1 June 2008 Both departments approved autonomy with slightly over 80% of the vote. Turnout was only 34.5% in Beni and slightly over 50% in Pando.

A similar referendum was held in Tarija Department on 22 June 2008.

== See also ==
- 2008 unrest in Bolivia
