= Condori (surname) =

Condori is a surname. Notable people with the surname include:

- Chuquimamani-Condori or Elysia Crampton (born 1985 or 1986), American musician and poet
- Damián Condori (born 1979), Bolivian politician
- Estanis Condori (born 1978), Bolivian politician
- Hernán Condori (born 1966), Peruvian doctor and politician
- Marco Condori (born 1966), Bolivian athlete

== See also ==
- Kunturi (disambiguation)
