= Media Luna =

Geographic region of Bolivia

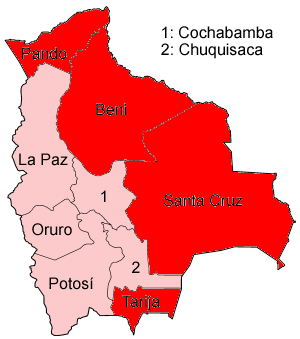
'Media Luna', named for the somewhat crescent shape

The Media Luna (lit. 'half-moon') or Media Luna Ampliada (lit. 'extended half-moon') refers to a group of four departments – Santa Cruz, Beni, Pando, and Tarija – in Bolivia which are home to a greater proportion of opponents to the national government led by Evo Morales and the Movement for Socialism (MAS) than the rest of the country. Pando has seen increasing support for MAS since 2009, while Tarija was initially supportive but has opposed MAS in every election after 2014. In contrast to the predominantly Indigenous Andean (Quechua and Aymara) populations of the Andean region such as La Paz and Cochabamba, the departments in the Media Luna are majority mestizo, as well as being made up of the remaining 26 groups of lowland indigenes with white minorities, specifically in Santa Cruz de la Sierra.

== Overview ==
The name comes from the general crescent shape made by the four departments. The term media luna was coined soon after the election of Evo Morales to designate the mostly eastern-located departments that objected to the nationalization and redistribution of natural gas that is a major natural resource in the region and the policy of land reform that would be most vigorously enacted in those regions. The eastern departments are seen as more wealthy than the west.

The prefects of Santa Cruz, Beni, and Tarija elected in the December 2005 elections all hailed from Bolivian opposition parties. These governors formed the National Council for Democracy (CONALDE). In 2008, these departments were the major areas of violence between supporters of the national government and supporters of autonomy for the departments.

The list of Media Luna departments was extended by some observers to include the departments of Cochabamba and Chuquisaca in 2007 and 2008. Cochabamba's prefect, Manfred Reyes Villa endorsed the other Media Luna governors' proposals for departmental autonomy. In June 2008, opposition member Savina Cuéllar was elected as Prefect of Chuquisaca, marking a high point of opposition power. However in the 2008 recall referendum, Reyes Villa was recalled. In Chuquisaca as well as Tarija, Morales enjoyed majority support in the 2008 referendum only in the rural areas, while the capital cities (Sucre and Tarija respectively) had a majority for recalling Morales. Following the Porvenir Massacre, Pando's opposition prefect Leopoldo Fernández, who was arrested and detained for his suspected involvement in the massacre of at least 20 peasants, was replaced by an interim prefect from the military in September 2008.

Morales has seen increasing support in Pando since the 2009 elections, while Tarija has switched between popular support and opposition over several elections (supporting Morales up through the 2014 elections, then opposing in those thereafter). In 2014, Morales only lost in Beni. In 2020, Carlos Mesa won Beni and Tarija, additionally Luis Fernando Camacho won Santa Cruz. MAS under Luis Arce won all remaining 6 departments.

== Elections ==
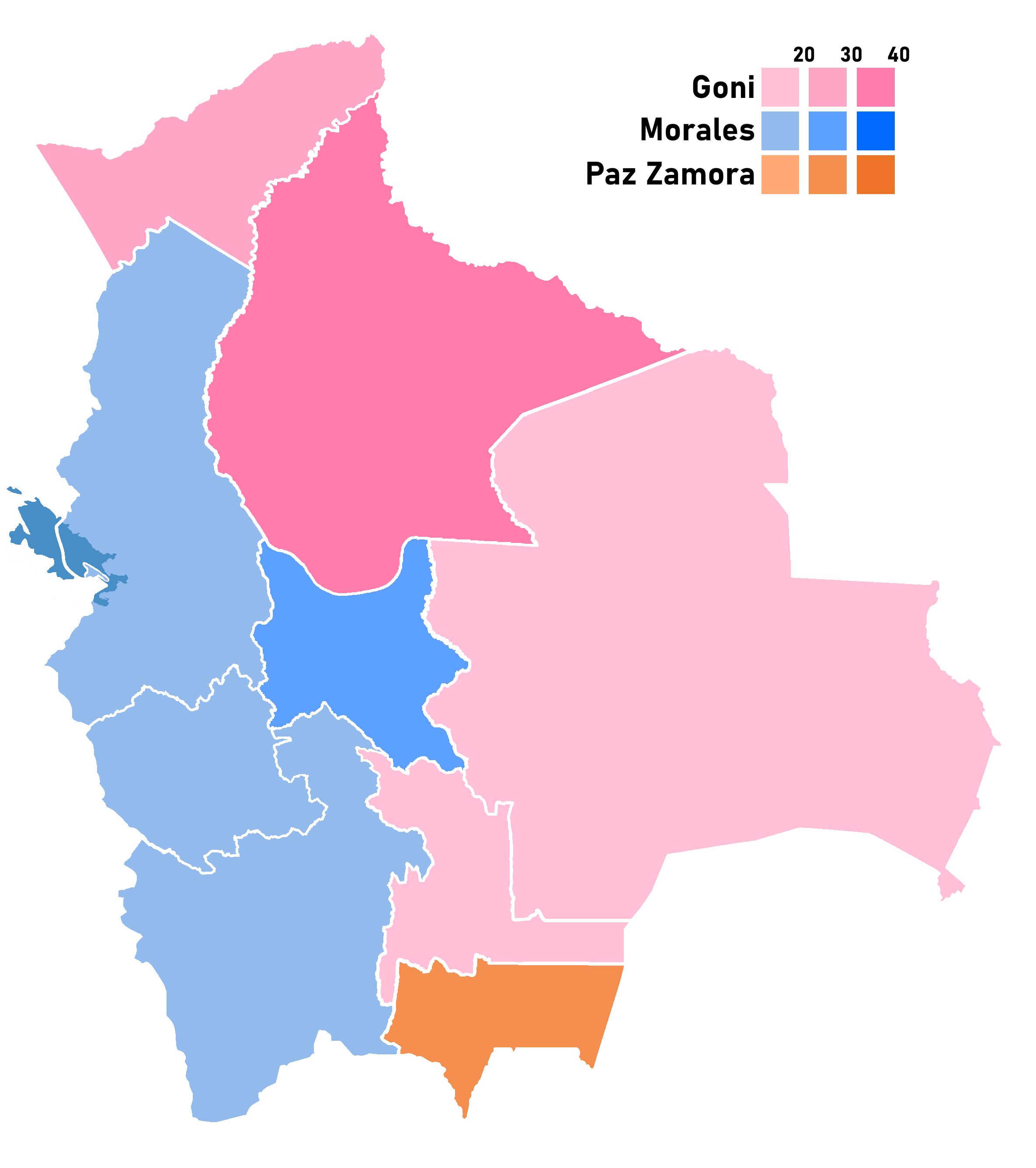
2002 general election

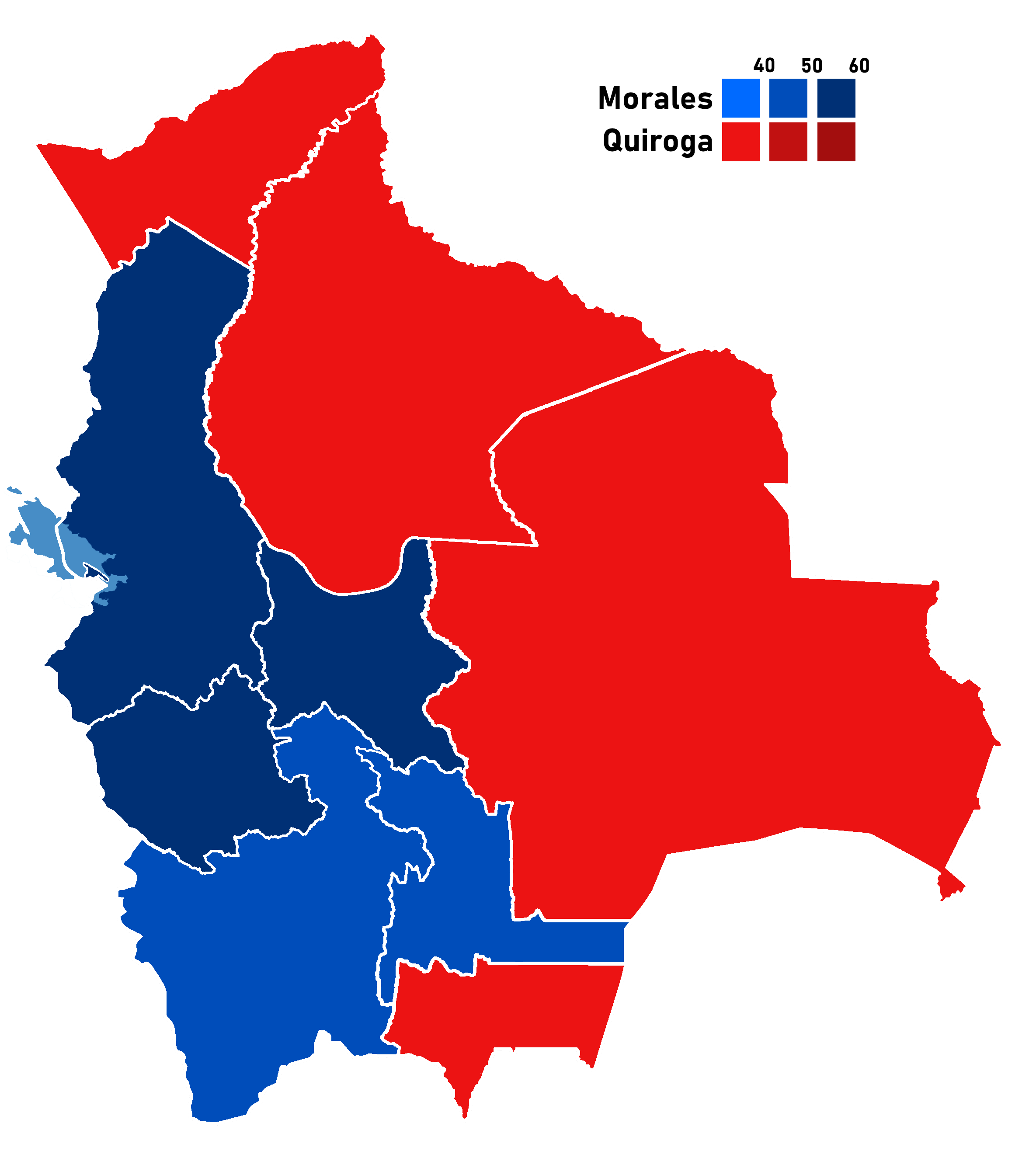
2005 general election

2008 referendum

2009 referendum

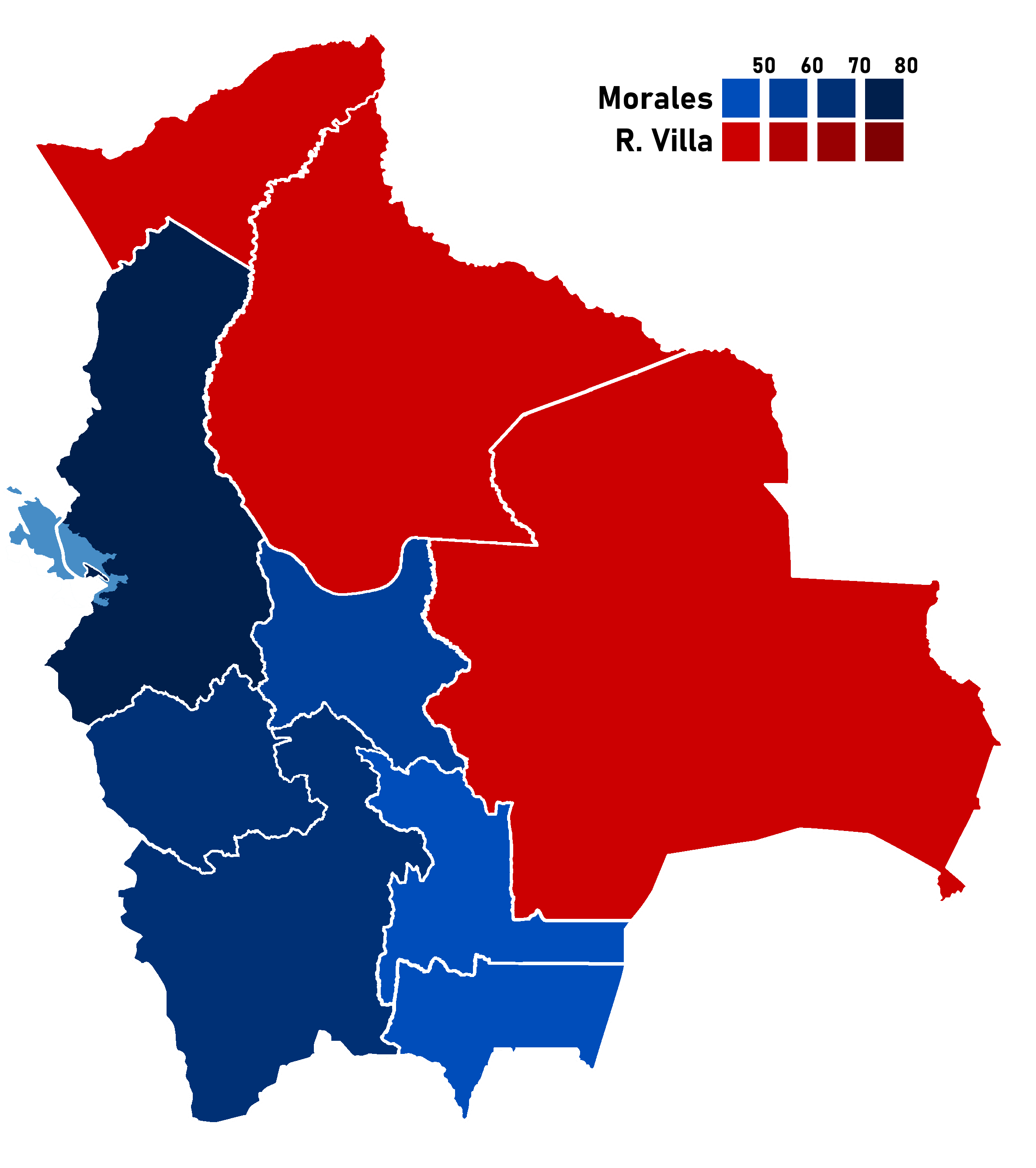
2009 general election

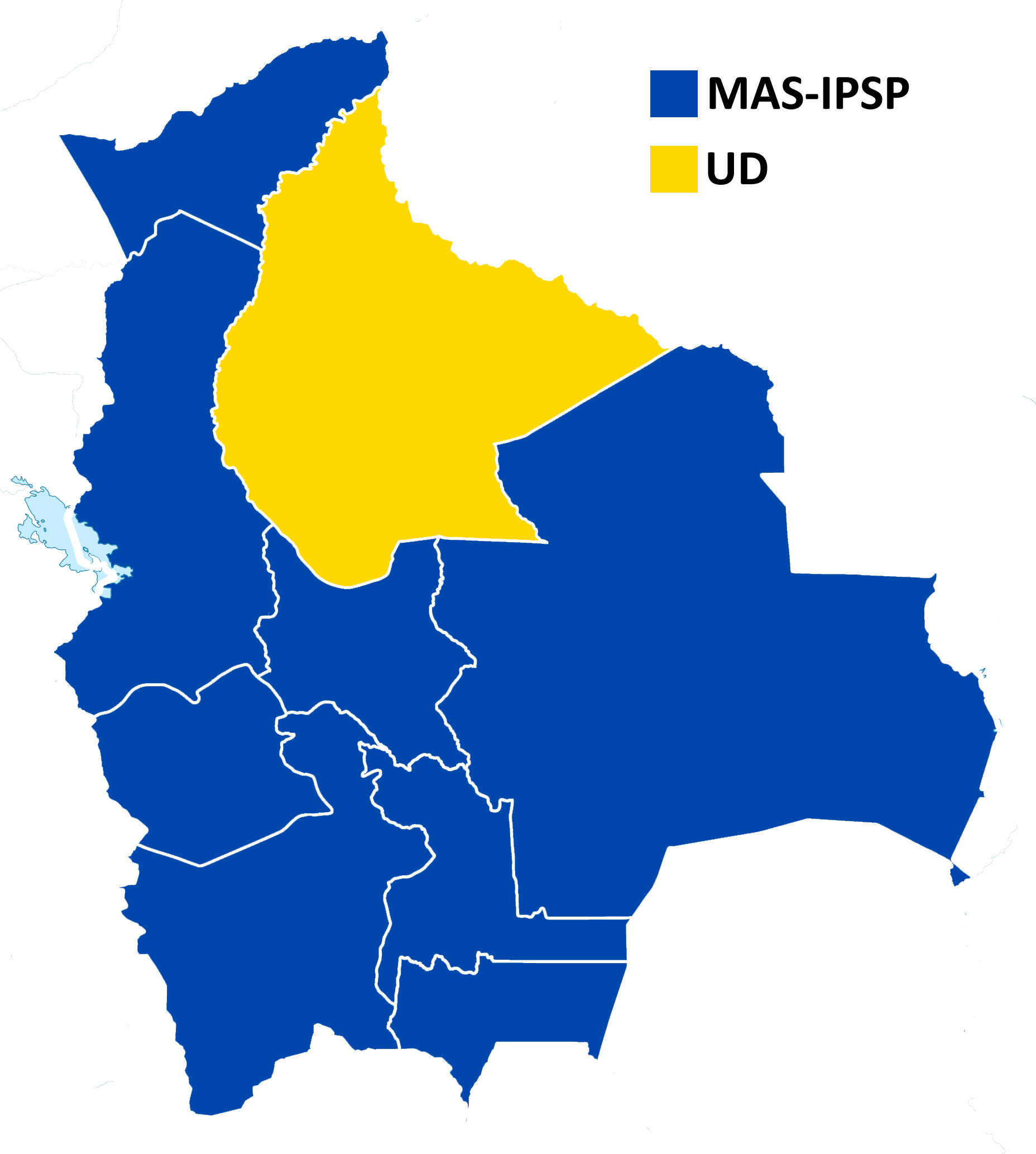
2014 general election

2016 referendum

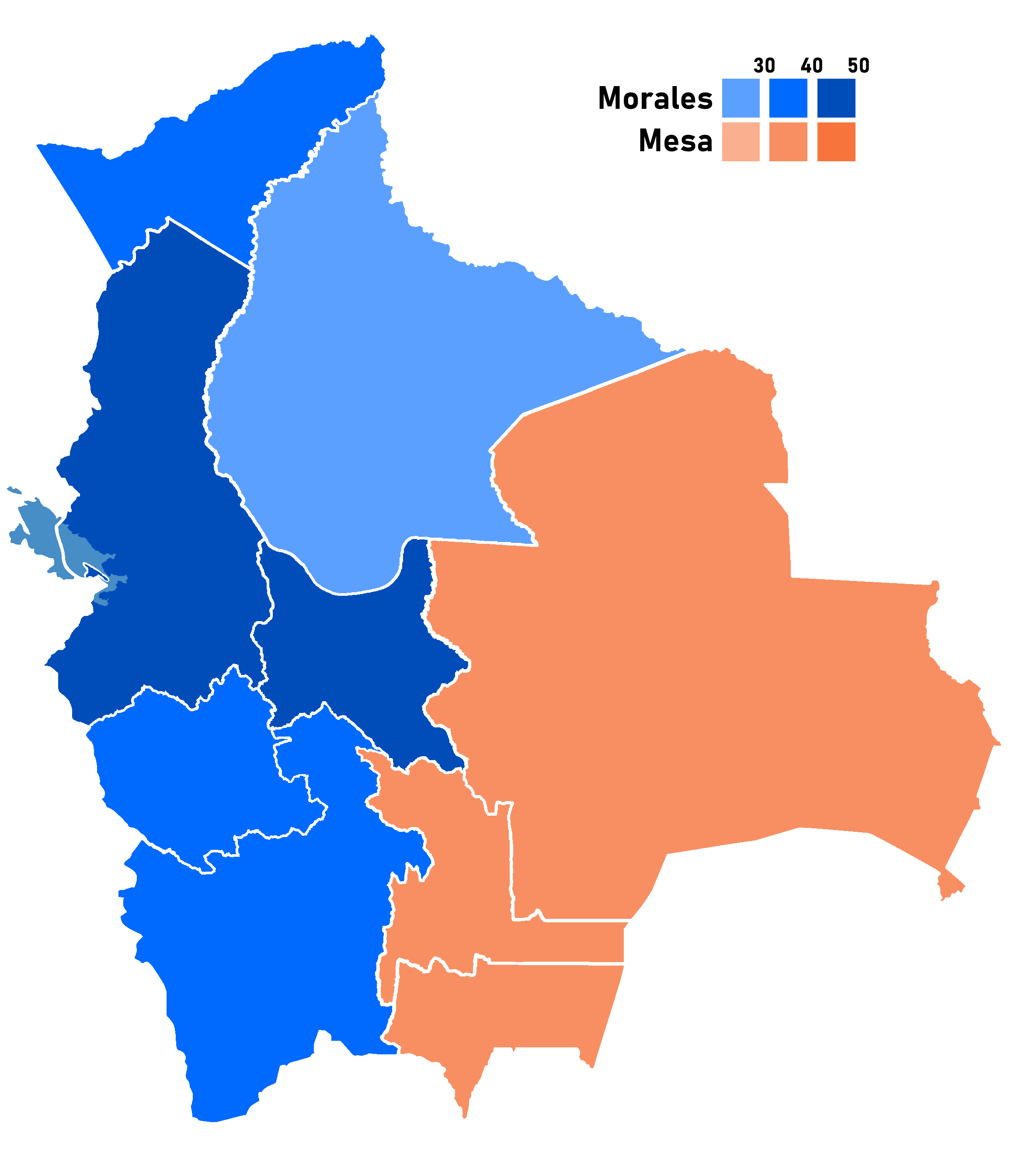
2019 general election

2020 general election

== See also ==
- 2008 unrest in Bolivia
