= Silvia Lazarte =

Bolivian politician (1964–2020)

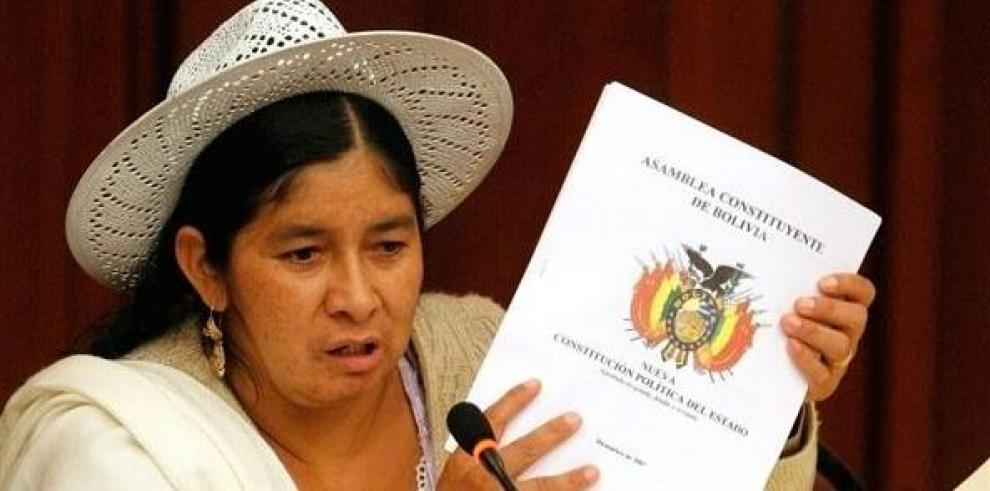

Silvia Lazarte (January 10 1964 — June 28 2020) was a Bolivian indigenous woman from Quechua ancestry, became the President of the Constituent Assembly on August 6, 2006. Lazarte was a peasant leader representing the Santa Cruz department, although she was born in the Cochabamba Department. She became the principal authority of this important conclave through an agreement between social organizations and President Evo Morales that considered the presence of an Indigenous woman to be of capital importance in the design of a new State.

Silvia Lazarte was previously a coca-leaf growers' leader and declared, when sworn in to the Constituent Assembly: “We all have to think with our hearts; we women and men legislators have to think how to end our differences”. At the time of her becoming president of the Constituent Assembly, she was 42 years old, and she was founder and Executive Secretary of the Central New Chapare Federation for Women.

She died on 28 June 2020 of natural causes.
