= 2006–2007 Constituent Assembly of Bolivia =

2006-2007 Bolivian Constituent Assembly

The Bolivian Constituent Assembly (Spanish: Asamblea Constituyente de Bolivia de 2006), convened on August 6, 2006, in Sucre, with the purpose of drafting a new national constitution by December 14, 2007; extended from the original deadline of August 6, 2007. The Assembly approved the new Political Constitution of the State on 9 December 2007. It was put to a national referendum held on 25 January 2009, and came into force on 7 February 2009.

Disputes over the content of this text and procedures of its approval aggravated political conflict in Bolivia, including violent conflicts in Sucre and Cochabamba. Opposition and conservative sectors including the "media luna" denounced the text claiming the procedure of its passage was illegal, passed with a third of constituent delegates absent (from minority conservative parties). Despite inclusive wording of the text, opponents have claimed the new document only represents indigenous peoples, discriminating against mixed (mestizo) and white (European) populations.

Prior Constituent Assemblies, or other bodies empowered with rewriting Bolivia's Constitution have taken place on at least 17 occasions since 1826.

== Process and structure of deliberations ==
The Constituent Assembly was authorized by Law 3091, promulgated by President Eduardo Rodríguez Veltzé on 6 July 2005, and by the Convocation Law of the Constituent Assembly (Law 3364), approved by Bolivia's National Congress on 6 March 2006. The latter law designated uninominal elections by the 70 districts used by the Chamber of Deputies, and plurinominal elections of five constituents from each department.

== Conflicts and controversies ==
=== Two-thirds vote ===
The Convocation Law required a two-thirds vote of the Assembly to approve the new Constitution. Debates over the specific interpretation of this provision occupied the Assembly from November 2006 to 14 February 2007. In drafting the regulations for the Assembly, the MAS proposed a simple majority vote should be required for most matters, with two-thirds required for sensitive matters. An initial regulation was passed on 17 November 2006 requiring a two-thirds majority votes only for the final text of the Constitution, and allowing reconsideration of up to three articles in which at least one-third of the Assembly proposed an alternative text. In mid-December, cabildos held in the media luna departments of Santa Cruz, Tarija, Beni and Pando threatened to refuse to abide by a constitution that was not approved by a two-thirds vote. Cochabamba prefect Manfred Reyes Villa also backed the two-thirds majority position in a pro-autonomy cabildo held on 15 December 2006, further sharpening the divisions that led to the January 2007 violence.

On 24 January 2007 the Bolivian Senate broke a deadlock and elected Jose Villavicencio (the lone Senator of the National Unity Party) as its president by a 15–12 vote, unseating a close ally of Morales. With the loss of control of the Senate, Morales has backed down from his position that a simple majority of assembly members should determine the wording of individual articles in the new Constitution. As a compromise measure, Morales called for any issue that can not be resolved with a two-thirds vote in the Constituent Assembly should be put before the people in a referendum, saying "Let the people decide with their vote, without fear." The head of Podemos, former President Jorge Quiroga, praised Morales' suggestion, saying "It's an important advance. It's a sign of flexibility."

After months of negotiations, on 8 February 2007 MAS announced that with the support of 18 members of the Podemos that they had reached the necessary consensus on the Assembly's voting procedures. The Assembly approved its regulations on 14 February 2007 with an overwhelming vote of 201 constituents (81%). The final rules required an absolute majority for the text overall, and a 2/3 vote in considering individual articles. Failure to achieve two-thirds would result in a Concertation commission to seek a new text; irreconciliable differencecs would be considered by popular referendum.

=== Capital status of Sucre ===
Sucre, the seat of the Assembly, was the country's sole capital prior to the 1899 civil war. In 2007, politicians from Sucre sought to re-establish Sucre as the sole capital and transfer all parts of the national government to the city. The Inter-Institutional Committee of the Interests of Chuquisaca was established in March 2007 for this purpose, and a proposal was presented to the Assembly's Regional Encuentro held in Sucre on 19 March.

Marches were held in support of this demand on 10 March and 25 July, while an opposing mobilization was held in La Paz and El Alto on 20 July. Assembly members from La Paz threatened in July to abandon the plenary sessions if the issue was discussed, but Chuquisaca and media luna members inserted the issue in the minority reports of six commissions and the majority report of one.

On 15 August, a MAS-sponsored resolution excluded the issue from being considered in plenary session. The following day the Inter-Institutional Committee began a civic strike and, on 17 August, an open cabildo called for consideration of the issue. Seven Chuquisaqueño assembly members began a hunger strike in support of full capital status. On 23 August, the conflict escalated with mass attacks on the headquarters of MAS-affiliated social movements in Sucre and on Assembly member Ignacio Mendoza (MAS, Chuquisaca), leading to the suspension of further plenary sessions. The 15 August resolution preventing discussion was annulled by court order on 8 September. The issue continued to occupy the Assembly in September and October until a multi-party accord was reached on 24 October, formally ratifying Sucre as constitutional capital and the seat of the judicial and electoral branches of government with honorary sessions of the legislature also held there. However, the Inter-Institutional Committee rejected this agreement as well. Its mobilizations against the Assembly continued through the rest of the body's meetings.

== Approval of new Political Constitution of the State ==
On November 24, 2007, the Constituent Assembly approved a preliminary draft of the constitution in full. MAS and its allies have claimed the opposition boycotted the final stages of the Assembly vote and incited violent student protests against the assembly, forcing its move to a military school on the outskirts of the city for protection.

On December 8, 2007, the Constituent Assembly moved its sessions to Oruro, citing safety concerns. Most members of opposition parties boycotted the meeting. 165 of the 255 delegates attended and participated in the voting. The final draft constitution was approved article by article in a marathon voting session through the night, completing approval of the draft on December 9, 2007. It was synthesized, cleaned up, and modified by an Editing Commission in La Paz. Leaders of several opposition parties and conservative civic committees in 5 departments stated they will not recognize the new text, claiming it was approved illegally.

On December 14, 2007, the President of the Constituent Assembly, Silvia Lazarte and members of the Directory Panel presented the complete text to the Bolivian National Congress to legislate a referendum. The following day marches and rallies were held in the capital La Paz in favor of the new Constitution while in the departmental capital of Santa Cruz rallies were held in favor of an extra-constitutional "Autonomy Statute."

The constitution was further modified by the Cochabamba Dialogue between the President and opposition Prefects in September 2008; and in Congress during negotiations for a referendum in October 2008.

On October 23, 2008, the Bolivian Congress approved holding a referendum on a new constitution supported by President Morales to empower the allegedly long oppressed indigenous majority of the country. The referendum took take place on 25 January 2009. With a 61.7% majority, the constitution came into effect on February 7.
