= 2008 Tarija autonomy referendum =

Referendum in Tarija, Bolivia

An autonomy referendum was held in Tarija Department in Bolivia on 22 June 2008, following the autonomy referendum held in Santa Cruz Department on 4 May 2008 and the autonomy referendums held in Beni Department and Pando Department on 1 June 2008.

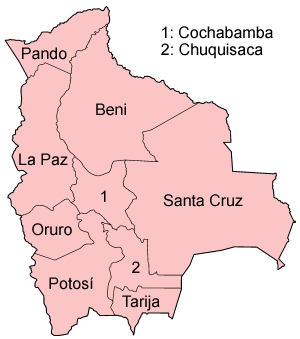
Departments of Bolivia

The referendum was approved with over 80% in favour, though most supporters of President Morales did not vote.
