= Savina Cuéllar =

Bolivian politician (born 1963)

Savina Cuéllar Leaños (born 30 January 1963) is a Bolivian politician who formerly as governor of the Department of Chuquisaca defeating Walter Valda. She is of Quechua ancestry and one of the leading oppositionists to president Evo Morales. 2006 she joined the Bolivian Constituent Assembly of 2006-2007 as an Evo Morales-supporter but changed sides over the question of whether Sucre or La Paz should be the capital of the country.
