= Bolivian Constitution of 1967 =

The Political Constitution of the Republic of Bolivia, approved on February 2, 1967, and promulgated on February 3, 1967, was the 16th constitution in the country's history. The text was drafted by the Bolivian Constituent Assembly of 1966-67, which met from August 16, 1966, to February 3, 1967. The 102 assembly members included representatives of the Social Democratic Party (Spanish: Partido Social Demócrata; PSD) led by Luis Adolfo Siles Salinas, the Popular Christian Movement (Spanish: Movimiento Popular Cristiano; MPC) and the Bolivian Socialist Falange (Spanish: Falange Socialista Boliviana; FSB). It operated under the shadow of the military dictatorship which took power in 1964.

The Constitution of 1967 experienced a series of amendments and reforms in 1994, 1995, 2002, 2004, and 2005. It remained in force until February 7, 2009, when it was replaced by the Bolivian Constitution of 2009.
