= Constituent Assembly of Bolivia =

The most recent Constituent Assembly of Bolivia was the Constituent Assembly of 2006–07, which drafted a new Constitution which was approved in the Constitutional referendum of 2009.

== Past assemblies ==
Prior assemblies have met to reconsider the form of Bolivia's government, beginning with the 1825 Deliberating Assembly (Asamblea Deliberante) in Chuquisaca. Others occurred in 1826 (Constituent Assembly), 1831 (a General Constituent Assembly), 1834 (Constituent Congress), 1839 (Constituent Congress), 1843 (National Convention), 1848 (Constituent Congress), 1851 (National Convention), 1861, 1868, 1871, 1877–78, 1900 (National Convention), 1920–21 (National Convention), 1938 (National Convention), 1944 (National Convention), 1945 (National Convention), and 1966–67
