= Alberto Luis Aguilar =

Bolivian politician (1950–2025)

Member of the Plurinational Legislative Assembly for Oruro Department
- In office 6 August 2002 – 22 January 2006

Personal details
- Born: Luis Alberto Aguilar Calle; 14 September 1950 Llallagua, Bolivia
- Died: 25 May 2025 (aged 74) Oruro, Bolivia
- Party: MAS
- Education: Bolivian Catholic University San Pablo
- Occupation: Theologian

Alberto Luis Aguilar Calle (14 September 1950 – 25 May 2025) was a Bolivian politician. A member of the Movimiento al Socialismo, he served in the Plurinational Legislative Assembly from 2002 to 2006.

Aguilar died in Oruro on 25 May 2025, at the age of 74.
