= Porvenir Municipality =

- Municipality
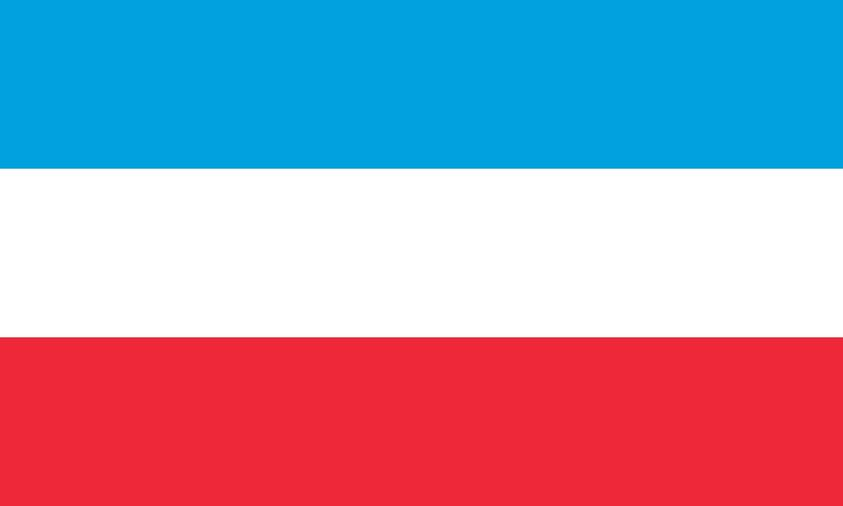
- Flag

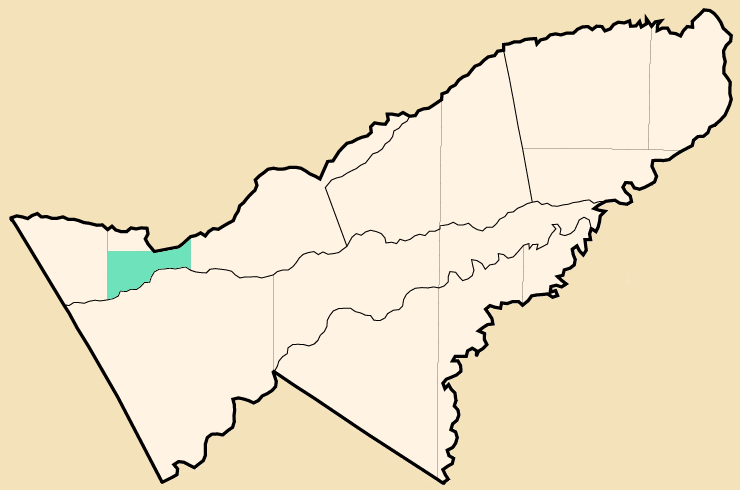
- Location within Pando Department

- Location within Bolivia
- Coordinates: 11°14′S 68°41′W
- Country: Bolivia
- Department: Pando Department
- Province: Nicolás Suárez Province
- Elevation: 728 ft (222 m)

Population (2001)Instituto Nacional de Estadística
  - Total: 3,713
- Time zone: UTC-4 (-4)

Porvenir Municipality is a municipal section of the Nicolás Suárez Province in the Pando Department, Bolivia. Its seat is Porvenir. It was the site of the Porvenir Massacre on September 11, 2008. It is also the birthplace, Ana Lucía Reis.
