= 2009 Bolivian constitutional referendum =

A constitutional referendum was held in Bolivia on 25 January 2009, postponed from the initially planned dates of 4 May 2008 and then 7 December 2008. Drafted by the Constituent Assembly in 2007, the new constitution was approved in the referendum according to an exit poll by Ipsos Apoyo for La Razón and ATB, a Bolivian television network. Furthermore, it required early elections to be held on 6 December 2009.

== History ==
Under President Evo Morales, the Constituent Assembly was elected on 2 July 2006. The referendum should originally have taken place on 6 August 2007, but the Assembly's validity was extended until 14 December 2007. The referendum was important for the Afro-Bolivian population and activists like Marfa Inofuentes Pérez, who lobbied for and were successful in obtaining inclusion of articles recognizing Bolivia's black population and providing legal protections for the minority group on par with other ethnic groups. On 9 December 2007, the Assembly approved the draft and on 14 December, the Assembly officially handed the constitution draft over to the National Congress.

The National Congress adopted the law on 28 February 2008 calling for the referendum on 4 May 2008 even though many opposition members chose to stay away during the vote. A law was also approved and signed by Morales that permitted only Congress to call departmental referendums, thereby barring the departmental referendums on autonomy that had also been called for 4 May.

On 7 March 2008, the National Electoral Court suspended the referendum, along with the opposition's regional referendums, saying that there was not enough time for adequate electoral preparations. Nonetheless, the government of Santa Cruz Department went ahead and held its autonomy referendum as planned, ignoring the Court's interdiction on all referendums. Beni Department and Pando Department held their referendums on 1 June 2008.

In a decree on 28 August 2008, Morales declared that the referendum would be held on 7 December 2008.

- It acknowledges Bolivia as a unitary plurinational state.
- It acknowledges Bolivia as a secular state (rather than a Catholic state, as in the previous constitution).
- Natural resources are the exclusive dominion of the Bolivian people, administered by the state.
- The number of members of the Chamber of Deputies is reduced, while the number of senators is increased; the members of the National Congress will be elected by first past the post voting in the future, in a change from the previous mixed member proportional system.
- A mixed economy will be established; in a separate question within the referendum, voters decided to allow private land possession up to 5,000 hectares (12,400 acres).
- Local autonomies and decentralisation will be reformed.
- The President will be allowed to be reelected once. Furthermore, if no candidate gains more than 50% of the vote in the presidential election, there will be a second round; up to now, the National Congress decided who would become President in such a case.

In April 2013, the Supreme Court ruled that the first term of President Evo Morales did not count towards constitutional term limits as the constitution of Bolivia had since been amended, thus allowing Evo Morales a third term.

- It introduces the possibility of recall elections for all elected officials.
- The judiciary is reformed, and judges will be elected in the future and no longer appointed by the National Congress.
- Sucre will be acknowledged as Bolivia's capital, but the institutions will remain where they are (executive and legislative in La Paz, judiciary in Sucre). The electoral authorities, which will become a fourth constitutional power, will be situated in Sucre.

== Unrest and agreement ==
Following unrest in Pando, the government and the opposition held talks which resulted in a compromise reached on 20 October 2008. They agreed to hold the referendum on 25 January 2009 and early elections on 6 December 2009; Morales in turn promised he would not run again in 2014 after his likely reelection in 2009, despite the fact that he would be allowed to do so under the new constitution.

== Results ==
President Evo Morales enacted the new constitution on 7 February 2009, saying that he had accomplished his mission to "re-found" Bolivia. He spoke in front of thousands of his supporters in the town of El Alto, located near La Paz, claiming that his opponents had "tried ceaselessly" to have him killed. He also said: "Now I want to tell you that they can drag me from the palace. They can kill me. Mission accomplished for the re-founding of the new united Bolivia". One key reform allows Morales to stand for re-election in December 2009.

New constitution
Choice	Votes	%
For	2,064,417	61.43
Against	1,296,175	38.57
Total	3,360,592	100.00
Valid votes	3,360,592	95.70
Invalid votes	91,583	2.61
Blank votes	59,524	1.70
Total votes	3,511,699	100.00
Registered voters/turnout	3,891,316	90.24
Source: OEP

Cap on maximum landholdings
Choice	Votes	%
5,000 hectares	1,956,596	80.65
10,000 hectares	469,385	19.35
Total	2,425,981	100.00
Valid votes	2,425,981	69.16
Invalid votes	188,551	5.38
Blank votes	893,198	25.46
Total votes	3,507,730	100.00
Registered voters/turnout	3,891,316	90.14
Source: OEP

== See also ==
- Constitution of Bolivia
