= 2008 Santa Cruz autonomy referendum =

Santa Cruz Department within Bolivia

A referendum to approve the autonomy statute of Santa Cruz Department of Bolivia was held on 4 May 2008. The vote resulted from strains between the Prefecture of Santa Cruz and President Evo Morales. The referendum was declared illegal and unconstitutional by the National Electoral Court. Final results from the referendum showed that 85.6% of participating voters supported autonomy. Abstention rates were 37.9%. Partisans of the Movement for Socialism called for a boycott of the vote, and the Guarayo, Guaraní, Chiquitano, Ayoreo, Yuracaré-Moxeño indigenous peoples were urged to reject holding the vote in their territories.

Similar referendums were held in Beni Department and Pando Department on 1 June 2008 (see 2008 Bolivian autonomy referendums) and in Tarija Department on 22 June 2008 (see 2008 Tarija autonomy referendum).

== Response ==
Ruben Costas, the governor of Santa Cruz, welcomed the result saying ”With the vote the start of a structural reform of transcendental importance in our nation has been consolidated... The ballot boxes have delivered their verdict: the emissaries of evil cannot impose their bitterness and hate".

The United Nations Office of the High Commissioner for Human Rights stated in its annual human rights report that the referendums: "took place even though the National Electoral Court ruled that the prefectures did not have the authority to call for such a vote and that they were infringing the Constitution."

A United Nations mission to Bolivia from the Permanent Forum on Indigenous Issues later declared that the Santa Cruz autonomy statute "promotes, allows, strengthens and reproduces practices of servitude", referring to conditions of debt-servitude and conditions analogous to slavery that are suffered by some indigenous groups in Santa Cruz. Bartolomé Clavero, a Spanish law professor from the Permanent Forum later stated that: "Anyone who has voted for this statute supports servitude."

== Legacy ==
Evo Morales's government eventually reversed its position on autonomy during the 2009 election, granting autonomy to Santa Cruz in 2010 along similar lines to those requested in 2008.
