= Porvenir massacre =

2008 ambush in Bolivia

Deaths at El Porvenir, 11 September 2008

1. Pedro Oshiro
2. Alfredo Robles Céspedes
3. Bernardino Racua
4. Wilson Castillo Quispe
5. Wilson Richard Mejía Miahata
6. Arnaldo González Inuma
7. Alfonzo Cruz Quispe
8. Celedonio Bazoaldo García
9. Felix Roca Torrez
10. Ditter Tupa Matty
11. Luis A. Rivero
12. Jhonny Cari
Source: UNASUR, El Deber. Note: The killing of soldier Ramiiro Tiñini Alvarado at the Cobija airport on September 12, 2008 is also included in the prosecution for the massacre.

The Porvenir massacre (also known as El Porvenir massacre or Pando massacre) was a deadly ambush in the early hours of September 11, 2008, allegedly organized by Prefectural authorities of the Bolivian Department of Pando, as part of a civil coup d'état against the government of Evo Morales by members of the right-wing civic movement. As a result of the ambush, at least 12 Indigenous protesters from the municipality of El Porvenir died that day.

It was the most deadly act of political violence in Bolivia since 2003. The protesters were marching to the departmental capital of Cobija to protest against departmental government actions during a national political crisis. An investigation by the Union of South American Nations (UNASUR) found the massacre to be a crime against humanity. UNASUR's reported list of 19 victims was later shortened to 13 confirmed dead by Bolivian prosecutors.

== Background ==
=== Recall referendum ===
On August 10, 2008, a recall referendum was held in Bolivia on the mandates of President Evo Morales, his Vice-president Alvaro Garcia Linera and eight of the nine regional prefects. Evo Morales won the referendum with a 67% "yes" vote, and he and Garcia Linera were ratified in post. Two of the prefects, both aligned with the political opposition in the country, failed to gain enough support and had their mandates recalled with new prefects to be elected in their place. The elections were monitored by over 400 observers, including election observers from the Organization of American States, European Parliament and Mercosur.

=== Alleged civil coup attempt ===
After Morales' victory in the recall referendum, the Morales government claimed that right wing forces led by Ruben Costas, Mario Cossio, Leopoldo Fernandez and Ernesto Suarez rejected the result of the vote and, in September 2008, supported by Philip Goldberg, they launched a civil coup d'état, seizing public buildings and airports in the Departments of Santa Cruz, Beni, Pando, and Tarija, attacking government officials and Morales supporters, and calling for civil disobedience. This included the occupation of the National Institute for Agrarian Reform (INRA)'s Pando office. Campesinos, largely aligned with the Morales government, feared their recently granted land titles were at risk, although in fact they were safely stored in a military barracks.

== Event ==
In the early hours of September 11, 2008, a group organized by the central government left Riberalta with the intention to reach Cobija. Pedro Oshiro and Alfredo Céspedes, two Cobija residents were on the path of said group. As a result of a series of confrontations, near the city of Cobija, at least a dozen individuals died that day.

It was the most deadly act of political violence in Bolivia since 2003. The protesters were marching to the departmental capital of Cobija to protest departmental government actions during a national political crisis. An investigation by UNASUR found the massacre to be a crime against humanity.

== Judicial Action ==
The event culminated in the spectacular arrest in September of the Prefect of Pando, Leopoldo Fernández, for the departmental government's role in the massacre of backers of President Evo Morales.

Prosecutors (of the Ministerio Público) presented indictments against 26 people, including Fernández, before the Sixth Sentencing Tribunal (Tribunal Sexto de Sentencia) on 12 October 2009. By that time, the number of deaths had been revised from 18 or 20 down to 13, including Ramiro Tiñini Alvarado, a soldier who was killed at the Cobija airport on 12 September 2008. The defendants are: Leopoldo Fernández Ferreira, Jorge Lengua Áñez, Olman Pino Soria, Rosendo Domínguez Deromides, Melitón Brito Ferreira, Homer Polanco Ventura, Felsin Fernández Medina, William Musuco Rodríguez, Ronald Musuco Rodríguez, Néstor Da Silva Rivero, Danilo Huari Cartagena, William Terrazas López, Juan Marcelo Mejido Flores, Abel Janco Cáceres, Adhemar Herrera Guerra, Hugo Apaza Sahonero, Felipe Vigabriel Villarroel, Máximo Aillón Martínez, Agapito Vira Cuéllar, Oswaldo Valdivia Avariega, Nilma Banegas Becerra, Hugo Mopi Soliz, Herman Justiniano Negrete, Marcial Peña Toyama, Roberto Rea Ruiz, Wilson Da Silva Ramallo y Evin Ventura Voght. Seven of the defendants were apprehended, while the remaining nineteen fled the country, mostly to Brazil. After several years in the San Pedro prison in La Paz, Fernández was released to house arrest in February 2013.

Roberto Rea Ruiz, Homer Polanco Ventura, and William Terrazas López accepted their guilt in an abbreviated trial and were sentenced to three to six years in jail. Four others, including the former prefect, went to trial in 2015: Leopoldo Fernández, Herman Justiciano, Evin Ventura, and Marcelo Mejido. After examination of evidence in the second half of 2015, closing arguments in the trial were held in March 2016. In March 2017, Fernández was found guilty as an indirect author of homicide, and acquitted of the crimes of murder, terrorism, criminal association, and light and severe assault; he was sentenced to fifteen years in prison. Alongside him, Herman Justiniano was sentenced to eight years in prison; Marcelo Mejido (an official with the Departmental Road Service), to five years; and Evin Ventura (the former mayor of Porvenir), to nine years.

The massacre is the subject of a 2010 documentary by César Brie, Morir en Pando ("To Die in Pando"), later amplified into Tahuamanu: Morir en Pando.

== See also ==
- List of massacres in Bolivia
