= Constitution of Bolivia =

Supreme law of Bolivia

The Constitution of Bolivia, officially known as the Political Constitution of the State (Spanish: Constitución Política del Estado) is the supreme law of Bolivia. It was adopted on 7 February 2009 and superseded the Constitution of 1967. It is the seventeenth constitution in the country's history; previous constitutions were enacted in 1826, 1831, 1834, 1839, 1843, 1851, 1861, 1868, 1871, 1878, 1880, 1938, 1945, 1947, 1961, and 1967.

The Constitution was promulgated by President Evo Morales, after being approved in a referendum with 90.24% participation. The referendum was held on 25 January 2009, with the constitution being approved by 61.43% of voters.

The 2009 Constitution defines Bolivia as a unitary plurinational, and secular (rather than a Catholic, as before) state, formally known as the Plurinational State of Bolivia. It calls for a mixed economy of state, private, and communal ownership; restricts private land ownership to a maximum of 5,000 hectares (12,400 acres); and recognizes a variety of autonomies at the local and departmental level. It elevates the electoral authorities to become a fourth constitutional power; introduces the possibility of recall elections for all elected officials; and enlarges the Senate. Members of the enlarged National Congress will be elected by first past the post voting in the future, in a change from the previous mixed member proportional system. The judiciary is reformed, and judges will be elected in the future and no longer appointed by the National Congress. It declares natural resources to be the exclusive dominion of the Bolivian people, administered by the state. Sucre will be acknowledged as Bolivia's capital, but the institutions will remain where they are (executive and legislative in La Paz, judiciary in Sucre). The electoral authorities will be situated in Sucre.

== Drafting process ==
The Bolivian Gas War preceded the drafting process. The Gas War centered on the controversial decision of the National Revolutionary Movement (MNR) party to export Bolivian natural gas through Chilean ports which had been taken by Chile in the Pacific War of the 1870s. The Gas War came to a head in October 2003 with violent protest throughout the country from various social actors, leaving at least 70 dead. The then President Gonzalo Sánchez de Lozada ('Goni') resigned and fled to the US. Goni was succeeded by Vice President Carlos Mesa who was forced to step down amid further widespread protest in El Alto, La Paz and Cochabamba in June 2005. This led to the selection of judge Eduardo Rodríguez as head of a caretaker government which provided setting for new elections in December 2005. A number of new parties stepped into the political frame.

Evo Morales' MAS party was elected and began implementing its 'October Agenda', a set of social movement demands stemming from The Gas War. The first of these tasks was to initiate a Constitutional Assembly to write a new constitution. The assembly comprised elected representatives from every region of the country. The Assembly failed to reach common agreement over various issues, including the rules of operation. Eventually, having failed to reach an agreement in Sucre - often amid violent protest or else stalemate - the MAS party were forced to retreat to Oruro to finalise the Constitution. The constitution was therefore further modified by an Editing Commission before, with much fanfare, Evo presided over the passage of the new Constitution on 14 December 2007.

Because nationally and internationally this process was not considered democratic by some, the constitution was not at the time considered legitimate, though it provided some political stability to Bolivia. Therefore, there was an ongoing process of renegotiation: this included dialogue in Cochabamba between the President and opposition Prefects in September 2008; and in Congress during negotiations for a referendum in October 2008.

== Text and provisions of the 2009 Constitution ==
=== Organization ===
The text of the constitution is divided in five broad parts:

- Part One: Fundamental Bases of the State, Rights, Obligations, and Guarantees
- Part Two: Functional Structure and Organization of the State
- Part Three: Territorial Structure and Organization of the State
- Part Four: Economic Structure and Organization of the State
- Part Five: Hierarchy of Norms and Reform of the Constitution

Each part is divided into titles, and these titles into chapters. Some chapters are themselves divided into sections. Altogether the constitution has 411 articles.

=== State and democracy ===
Bolivia is established by the current constitution as a plural and unitary state:

Article 1
Bolivia is constituted as a Unitary Social State of Plurinational, Community-Based Law, free, independent, sovereign, democratic, intercultural, decentralized, and with autonomies. Bolivia is founded in plurality and political, economic, juridical, cultural, and linguistic pluralism within the integrating process of the country.

— Political Constitution of the State, First Part, Title I, Chapter One: Model of State, Nueva Constitución Política del Estado, p. 3.

The Constitution (in Chapter Three of Title I) defines the forms of democracy—participatory, representative and community-based—and structure of government to be used in Bolivia. Direct and participatory democracy takes place through referendums, citizen legislative initiatives, revocation of elected officials' mandates, assemblies, cabildos and prior consultation. Representative democracy takes place through the election of representatives through universal, direct, and secret vote. Communal democracy takes place through the "election, designation or nomination of authorities and representatives" among indigenous, originary, or campesino peoples and nations, using their own norms and procedures. The same chapter establishes a separation of powers between four branches of government: legislative, executive, judicial, and electoral.

Bolivia also becomes a "pacifist state" that rejects war, although it reserves a right to "legitimate defense." The Constitution prohibits the installation of foreign military bases within the country.

The Constitution is established as the supreme law of the Bolivian state, and 36 indigenous languages as well as Spanish are declared official languages. All departmental governments must use, as official languages, one indigenous language in addition to Spanish.

The Constitution assigns the role of national capital to Sucre, not referring to La Paz in the text. Nonetheless the Palacio Quemado (the then-Presidential Palace and seat of Bolivian executive power) is located in La Paz, as are the Plurinational Legislative Assembly and Plurinational Electoral Organ. La Paz thus continues to be the seat of government and de facto administrative capital, and its position as such was cemented further when a new Presidential Palace, the Casa Grande del Pueblo, as well as a new building for the Plurinational Legislative Assembly, were built in La Paz rather than Sucre after the Constitution came into force.

Article 6
I. Sucre is the Capital of Bolivia.

— Political Constitution of the State, First Part, Title I, Chapter One: Model of State, Nueva Constitución Política del Estado, p. 4.

=== Electoral system ===
The electoral authorities, which became a fourth constitutional power, was situated in Sucre.

Following the Constitution's enactment, new elections to all public bodies were held, and all previous terms were not considered for term limits. The President is allowed to be re-elected once, which allowed Evo Morales two more terms if he decides to pursue this route (which he did); the relaxation of this term limit from two terms to three was rejected in the 2016 Bolivian constitutional referendum; one year later, the Plurinational Constitutional Court ruled to abolish this limit at the request of the MAS party, citing the American Convention on Human Rights; this ruling allowed Morales to run for re-election even after the original limit would have applied to him. Furthermore, if no candidate gains more than 50% of the vote in the presidential election, there will be a second round (a situation which first occurred in the 2025 elections); under Bolivia's previous constitutions, the National Congress decided who would become president in such a case.

=== Atacama corridor ===
The 2009 Constitution of Bolivia states that the country has an unrenounceable right over the territory that gives it access to the Pacific Ocean and its maritime space. This is understood as Chilean territory that Bolivia ceded in Treaty of Peace and Friendship of 1904 between Chile and Bolivia after the War of the Pacific which left Bolivia a landlocked country. The text also pledges to achieve resolution to the issue "through peaceful means."

The constitution states the following:

Article 267
I. The state of Bolivia declares its indispensable and irreversible right over the territories that give it access to the Pacific Ocean and its maritime space. II. The effective solution to the maritime problem is to be carried out by peaceful means and the exercise of sovereignty over said territory, constitutes permanent objectives and indispensable ones of the Bolivian State.

— Second Part, Title VIII, Chapter Four: Maritime Restoration, Nueva Constitución Política del Estado (p. 62)

=== Coca ===
One important change in the new constitution is the introduction of an article concerning coca. The article states:

Article 384

The State shall protect native and ancestral coca as cultural patrimony, a renewable natural resource of Bolivia's biodiversity, and as a factor of social cohesion; in its natural state it is not a narcotic. Its revaluing, production, commercialization, and industrialization shall be regulated by law.

— Fourth Part, Title II, Chapter Seven: Coca, Nueva Constitución Política del Estado,(p. 89)

== Transition and implementation ==
The 2009 Constitution is accompanied by a transitional law. In order for the various bodies of government created under the Constitution to function a set of five structural laws were needed, and a deadline of 180 days following the enactment of the Constitution was set for these laws to be passed. They are:

1. The Electoral Organs Law
2. The Judicial Organs Law
3. The Framework Law on Autonomies
4. The Electoral Regime Law
5. The Constitutional Court Law

An analysis by Minister of Autonomy Carlos Romero estimates that at least 106 laws must be approved to fully implement the new constitution. As of April 2011, sixteen such laws had been passed. The head of the MAS-IPSP delegation in the Chamber of Deputies has pledged to prioritize 40 further "necessary" laws in 2011 sessions.

=== Changed institutions ===
The 2009 Constitution replaces or renames a wide variety of institutions. This following table is a summary of such changes.

Old Institution	Final date	New Institution	Starting date	Changes
Republic of Bolivia		Plurinational State of Bolivia	22 January 2010	
National Congress; Congreso Nacional		Plurinational Legislative Assembly; Asamblea Legislativa Plurinacional		Includes indigenous representatives
National Electoral Court; Corte Nacional Electoral		Plurinational Electoral Organ; Orgáno Electoral Plurinacional		Elevated to a fourth branch of government
National Electoral Court; Corte Nacional Electoral		Supreme Electoral Court; Tribuno Supremo Electoral	15 August 2010	The governing court of the Plurinational Electoral Organ is named distinctly from the body as a whole.
Supreme Court; Corte Suprema de Justicia		Supreme Court of Justice; Tribuno Supremo de Justicia	3 January 2012	National and departmental courts are chosen through elections. The high court is renamed and constitutionality questions are now handled by a separate court.
Supreme Court; Corte Suprema de Justicia		Plurinational Constitutional Court; Tribunal Constitucional Plurinacional	3 January 2012	National and departmental courts are chosen through elections. The high court is renamed and constitutionality questions are now handled by a separate court.
Department-level institutions
Prefecture; Prefectura		Government; Gobierno or Gobernación departamental		Have executive-legislative division of powers, more direct election, and their own statutes of autonomy
Prefect; Prefecto		Governor; Gobernador		Highest executive official. Chosen by popular election, rather than by presidential nomination (since December 2005 elections)
Departmental Council (of councilmen and councilwomen); Consejo departamental (of consejeros)		Departmental legislative assembly (of assemblymen and assemblywomen); Asamblea legislativa departamental (of asambleístas)		Legislative officials. Formerly chosen by municipalities, now directly elected by vote or indigenous elections
Regional institutions
Native Community Land; Tierra Comunitaria de Origen		Indigenous Originary Campesino Territory; Territorio Indígena Originaria Campesino		Made into a part of a multi-level system of autonomies

== Past constitutions ==
Bolivia has had seventeen constitutions, including the present one, since its foundation in 1825. Its previous constitutions were enacted in 1826, 1831, 1834, 1839, 1843, 1851, 1861, 1868, 1871, 1878, 1880, 1938, 1945, 1947, 1961 and 1967.

In force start	In force end	Name	Name of State	Drafted and adopted by	Amended
1938	1945	Bolivian Constitution of 1938	Republic of Bolivia	National Convention of 1938, meeting 23 May 1938 – 30 October 1938.	
1945	1947	Bolivian Constitution of 1945	Republic of Bolivia	National Convention of 1945, meeting 4 July 1945 – 3 August 1945.	
1947	?	Bolivian Constitution of 1947	Republic of Bolivia	No Constituent Assembly was convened.	
1961	2 February 1967	Bolivian Constitution of 1961	Republic of Bolivia	No Constituent Assembly was convened.	
2 February 1967	7 February 2009	Bolivian Constitution of 1967	Republic of Bolivia	Constituent Assembly of 1967	Reformed in 1994, 1995, 2002, 2004, and 2005
Constitutional rule was suspended from 1969 to 1982.
7 February 2009		Bolivian Constitution of 2009	Plurinational State of Bolivia	Bolivian Constituent Assembly of 2006-2007; adopted by referendum 25 January 2009.	

== See also ==
- Bolivian constitutional referendum, 2009
- Bolivian constitutional referendum, 2016
- Constitution
- Constitutional law
- Constitutional economics
- Constitutionalism
