= Departments of Bolivia =

First-level administrative divisions of Bolivia

Departments of Bolivia Departamentos de Bolivia (Spanish)
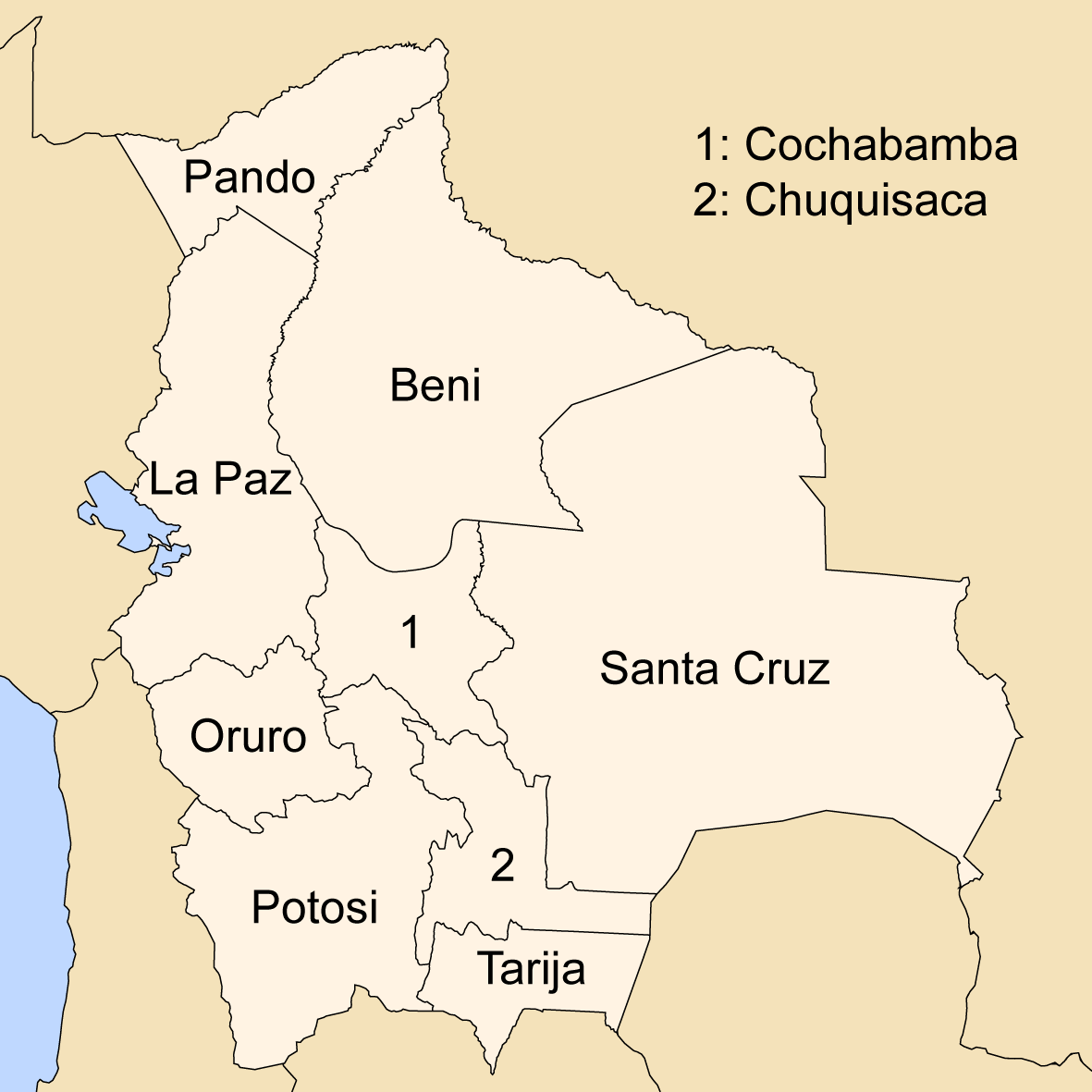
- Category: Unitary state
- Location: Plurinational State of Bolivia
- Number: 9
- Populations: 110,436 (Pando) – 3,412,921 (Santa Cruz)
- Areas: 37,620 km^{2} (14,526 sq mi) (Tarija) – 370,620 km^{2} (143,098 sq mi) (Santa Cruz)
- Government: Governors, Departmental governments, national government
- Subdivisions: Provinces

Bolivia is a unitary state consisting of nine departments (Spanish: departamentos). Departments are the primary subdivisions of Bolivia, and possess certain rights under the Constitution of Bolivia. Each department is represented in the Plurinational Legislative Assembly—a bicameral legislature consisting of the Senate and the Chamber of Deputies. Each department is represented by four Senators, while Deputies are awarded to each department in proportion to their total population.

Out of the nine departments, La Paz was originally the most populous, with 2,706,351 inhabitants as of 2012 but the far eastern department of Santa Cruz has since surpassed it by 2020; Santa Cruz also claims the title as the largest, encompassing 370,621 square kilometres (143,098 mi^{2}). Pando is the least populated, with a population of 110,436. The smallest in area is Tarija, encompassing 37,623 square kilometres (14,526 mi^{2}).

== Departments ==
Flag	Department	ISO 3166-2 code	Capital city	Largest city	Population (2024)	Area km^{2} (sq mi)	Density per km^{2} (sq mi)	Deputy seats
Beni Department, Bolivia	Beni	B	Trinidad		477,441	213,564 (82,458)	2.24 (5.80)	9
	Chuquisaca	H	Sucre		600,132	51,524 (19,894)	11.65 (30.17)	11
	Cochabamba	C	Cochabamba		2,005,373	55,631 (21,479)	36.05 (93.37)	19
	La Paz	L	La Paz	El Alto	3,022,566	133,985 (51,732)	22.56 (58.43)	29
	Oruro	O	Oruro		570,194	53,588 (20,690)	10.64 (27.56)	9
	Pando	N	Cobija		130,761	63,827 (24,644)	2.05 (5.31)	5
	Potosí	P	Potosí		856,419	118,218 (45,644)	7.24 (18.75)	14
	Santa Cruz	S	Santa Cruz de la Sierra		3,115,386	370,621 (143,098)	8.41 (21.78)	25
	Tarija	T	Tarija		534,348	37,623 (14,526)	14.2 (36.78)	9

=== Former Departments ===
Flag	Department	Capital city	Largest city	Population	Area km^{2} (sq mi)	Fate
	Litoral Department	Antofagasta		15,000 (1879)	154,393 (59,611)	Incorporated into Chile

== By population ==
Department	2024	2012	2001	1992	1976	1950	1900	1882	1854	1845	1835	1831
Beni	477,441	421,196	362,521	276,174	168,367	71,636	24,500	16,700	33,400	48,400	N/A (Note: The Department of Beni was created November 18, 1842)	
Chuquisaca	600,132	576,153	531,522	453,756	358,516	260,479	187,100	113,300	189,500	156,000	95,000	112,600
Cochabamba	2,005,373	1,758,143	1,455,711	1,110,205	720,952	452,145	310,600	176,800	322,900	279,000	162,400	226,700
La Paz	3,022,566	2,706,351	2,350,466	1,900,786	1,465,078	854,079	406,600	312,700	471,200	412,900	373,600	348,100
Litoral	N/A (Note: The Litoral Department was taken by Chile after the War of the Pacific)								5,500	4,500	5,100	3,800
Oruro	570,194	494,178	391,870	340,114	310,409	192,356	82,000	111,400	91,800	95,300	111,000	84,100
Pando	130,761	110,436	52,525	38,072	34,493	16,284	N/A (Note: Pando Department was created 24 September 1938)					
Potosí	856,419	823,517	709,013	645,889	657,743	509,087	310,100	234,000	250,700	243,300	226,300	192,200
Santa Cruz	3,115,386	2,655,084	2,029,471	1,364,389	710,724	244,658	163,400	94,000	120,400	75,600	54,400	43,800
Tarija	534,348	482,196	391,226	291,407	187,204	103,441	64,700	31,500	60,000	63,800	33,000	36,200
Other	N/A						6,900	7,200	4,400	N/A		41,200

== See also ==
- ISO 3166-2:BO, the ISO codes for the departments of Bolivia.
- Bolivian autonomy referendums, 2008
- List of Bolivian departments by Human Development Index
- Lists of Bolivian department governors
