= Elizabeth Salguero =

Bolivian Minister of Cultures (2011–2012)

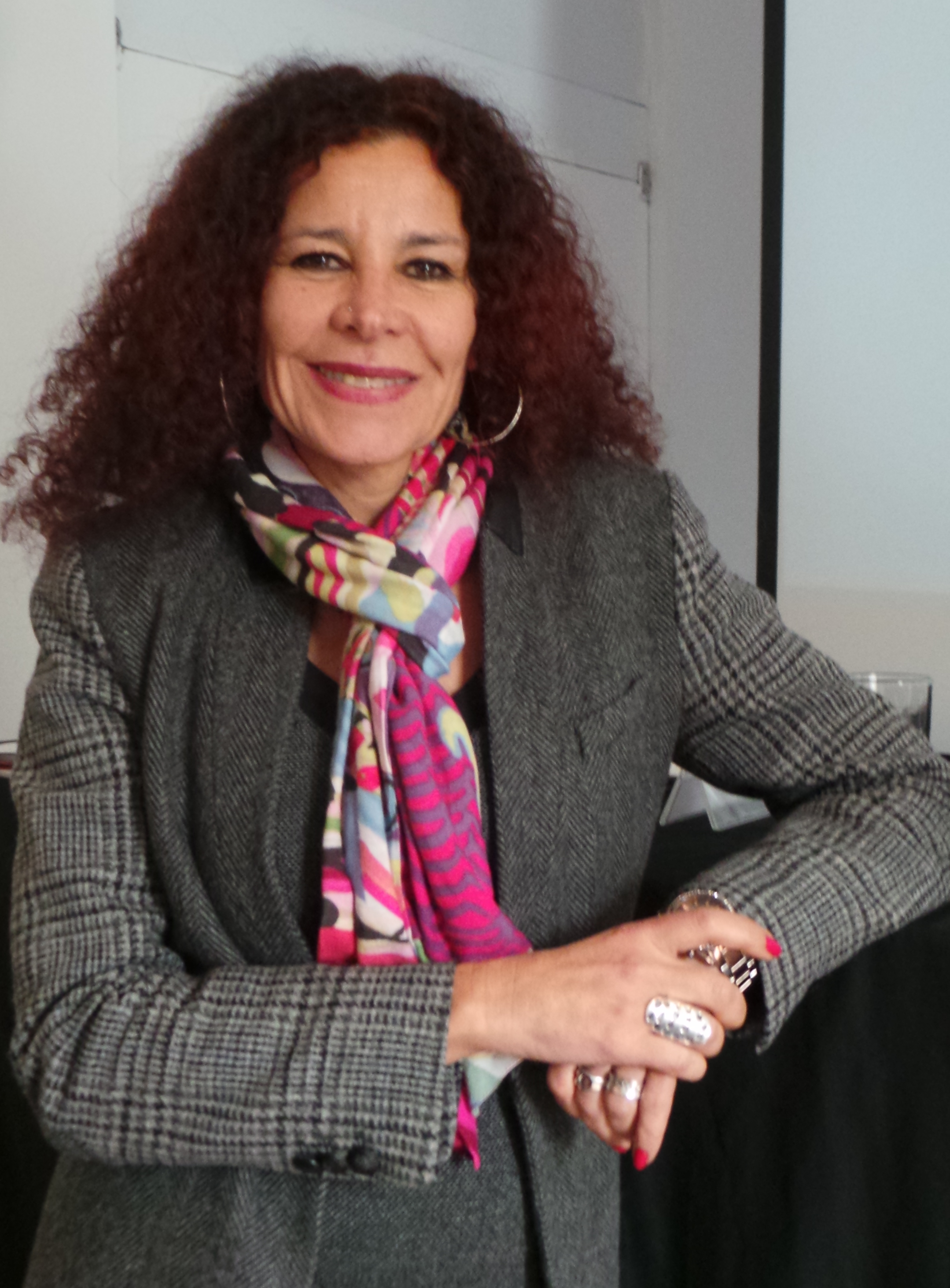

Minister of Cultures
- In office 15 February 2011 – 23 January 2012
- President: Evo Morales
- Preceded by: Zulma Yugar
- Succeeded by: Pablo Groux

Ambassador of Bolivia to Germany
- In office 11 April 2012 – 31 July 2015
- President: Evo Morales
- Preceded by: Walter Magne
- Succeeded by: Jorge Cárdenas

Member of the Chamber of Deputies from La Paz
- In office 22 January 2006 – 19 January 2010
- Substitute: Ramiro Uchani
- Preceded by: Dante Pino
- Succeeded by: Gilda Oporto
- Constituency: Party list

Personal details
- Born: Elizabeth Cristina Salguero Carrillo; 12 December 1964 (age 61) La Paz, Bolivia
- Party: Movement for Socialism (2005–present)
- Other political affiliations: Fearless Movement (1999–2005)
- Education: Loretto School
- Alma mater: National University of Córdoba; University of Karlsruhe (MRP)

Elizabeth Cristina Salguero Carrillo (born 12 December 1964) is a Bolivian diplomat, journalist, politician, and women's rights activist who served as minister of cultures from 2011 to 2012. A member of the Movement for Socialism, she previously served as a party-list member of the Chamber of Deputies from La Paz from 2006 to 2009. In 2009, she was elected as a substitute party-list member of the Chamber of Deputies from La Paz but resigned before taking office in order to launch an ultimately unsuccessful La Paz mayoral campaign. From 2012 to 2015, she served as ambassador of Bolivia to Germany, and since then has worked as an international expert in strategic planning at UN Women.

== Early life and career ==
Elizabeth Salguero was born on 12 December 1964. In 1982, she graduated from the Loretto School in La Paz before completing her education abroad, attending the National University of Córdoba in Argentina from 1984 to 1989, and obtaining a bachelor's degree in social communication. Salguero later traveled to Germany to study at the University of Karlsruhe from 1991 to 1993, where she graduated with a master's in regional planning.

Returning to Bolivia, Salguero entered the public arena as an activist in the feminist and indigenous movements of the 1990s. In particular, she focused her activities on the rights of indigenous women, whom she considered to be "triple discriminated against" due to their ethnicity, impoverishment, and gender. In 1994, Salguero founded and directed the National Network of Information and Communication Workers, focused on producing and disseminating publications related to women's issues. From 1996 to 1997, she served as the coordinator of communication and documentation for the Women's Information and Development Center, working towards the expansion of women's rights in the country, especially in regards to gender quotas and the reduction of violence and harassment, and increased presence in political and social organizations. In 1995, Salguero served as the national coordinator of the NGO Forum of the Andean subregion at the Fourth World Conference on Women in Beijing. Later, between 2001 and 2004, she was the national coordinator of the Articulation of Women for Equity and Equality group.

Salguero directed the Crónica Azul magazine between 1996 and 2000. Additionally, she wrote as a columnist for La Razón, the Bolpress News Agency, and the Women's Alternative Communication Network. At the same time, Salguero played a role in alternative media as director and general manager of Radio Graffiti. From 2018 to 2023, she has been a columnist for Página Siete.

== Chamber of Deputies ==
From 2000 to 2001, Salguero served as gender coordinator of the La Paz mayor's office. Together with Mayor Juan del Granado, as well as Luis Revilla and other young officials dissatisfied with the traditional political parties, she participated in the foundation of the Fearless Movement (MSM), a progressive political party. However, political and ideological differences eventually led her to distance herself from the party. Instead, Salguero aligned herself with the emergent Movement for Socialism (MAS). In 2005, she stepped into politics as a MAS candidate for deputy and was elected as a party-list member of the Chamber of Deputies representing La Paz. During her term, Salguero served at various points on the International Relations, Social Policy, and Human Rights commissions of the Chamber of Deputies and was president of the latter.

=== 2009 and 2010 elections ===
In 2009, Salguero was among the few incumbent legislators nominated for reelection by the MAS, though this time as a substitute deputy to Héctor Enrique Arce. Although the pair emerged victoriously, the MAS nominated her as the party's candidate for the La Paz mayorship shortly after that. In order to qualify as a candidate, Salguero resigned her seat on 28 December, before taking office. She was replaced as Arce's substitute by Adelia Álvarez, who was in tenth position on the MAS' electoral list.

On 16 February 2010, Salguero inaugurated her electoral campaign with an offering to Pachamama in the center of the Plaza Murillo. Her primary electoral opponent was Revilla—Granado's chosen successor—of the MSM, the very party she had helped establish over a decade prior. During her campaign, Salguero proposed a debate with Granado rather than Revilla, viewing him as "the one who pulls the strings". Revilla, in turn, accused the MAS of lacking a government program, a claim Salguero rejected as false. Ultimately, Salguero failed to triumph over the MSM's ten-year incumbency advantage, and Revilla won the mayoral election.

== Minister of Cultures ==
Despite her electoral defeat, Salguero remained in the government's good graces and, on 15 February 2011, President Evo Morales appointed her to head the Ministry of Cultures in replacement of Zulma Yugar. Salguero's management focused its efforts on three axes: extending interculturalism in the arts and culture, emphasizing depatriarchalization as part of the process of decolonization, and promoting tourism. In particular, Salguero pledged to "eliminate those customs or concepts that promote any type of racial or gender discrimination". One aspect of this was the ministry's review of school textbooks to identify and remove racist terminology. Her political project culminated in the publication of the 2011–2015 Institutional Strategic Plan of the Ministry of Cultures, which aimed to clearly define the ministry's primary mission, vision, and strategic objectives, and outline its main public policy guidelines.

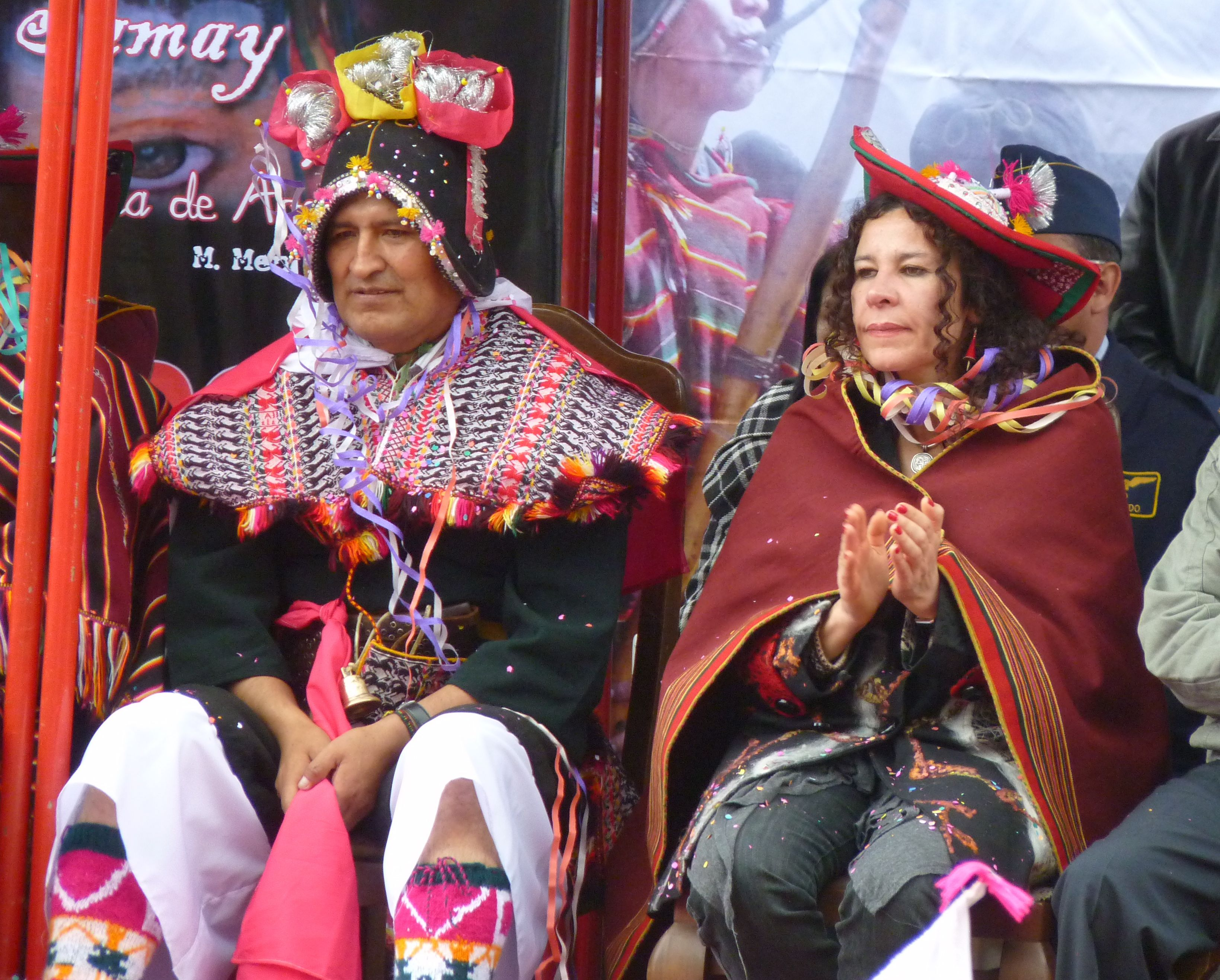
Salguero and Morales attend a Pukllay festival, 20 March 2011.

Other projects included works to conserve archaeological and cultural sites such as the ancient indigenous citadel of Tiwanaku and the silver-rich mountain of Cerro Rico, which had seen signs of neglect in recent years. In the case of Cerro Rico, which was in danger of collapsing, Salguero's administration was ultimately unable to negotiate a solution that both allowed the government to carry out conservation efforts while also guaranteeing the economic security of at least seventy percent of the miners who relied on its natural wealth to maintain a living. On the other hand, on 11 October 2011, the Center for Archaeological, Anthropological, and Administrative Research of Tiwanaku was established, responsible for the management, conservation, maintenance, refurbishment, research, and promotion of the complex. Through this, Salguero ensured that the government would be able to finance the protection of the Tiwanaku archaeological site and the regional museums around it.

In March 2011, Salguero nominated three Bolivian festivals to UNESCO for World Heritage recognition as part of the cultural and intangible heritage of humanity. These were: the Ichapekene Fiesta of San Ignacio de Moxos, the Pukllay festival in Tarabuco—including the Ayarichi dance of the Yampara people—and the Alasitas fair of La Paz. Additionally, her administration promoted laws that recognized eight folk dances as cultural and intangible heritage: Caporales, Chuta, Diablada, Kullawada, Llamerada, Morenada, Tinku, and the Afro-Bolivian Saya. Regarding tourism, the country brand "Bolivia awaits you" was launched in conjunction with a promotional website and the establishment of the Tourist Registration System.

After just under a year in office, Morales renewed his cabinet on 23 January 2012; Salguero was replaced by former minister Pablo Groux, who had previously headed the Ministry of Cultures during Morales' first term.

== Diplomatic career ==
Three months after her departure from the Ministry of Cultures, on 11 April 2012, Morales appointed Salguero as Bolivia's ambassador to Germany, a post that had been vacant for the previous six months. During her term, Salguero negotiated the repatriation of an Ekeko Tunu statuette from the Bern Historical Museum in Switzerland back to Bolivia. The artifact had been stolen from a site in Tiwanaku over a century prior by the Swiss diplomat Johann Jakob von Tschudi. Despite its initial refusal to return the relic, the museum ultimately relented after a long period of negotiations and agreed to repatriate it in early 2015. Salguero stated that the Ekeko's return set a precedent for other countries seeking to recover their cultural heritage.

After three years at the helm of the Bolivian mission in Germany, Salguero resigned from her post on 31 July 2015. After that, she retired from party politics, partly due to her disagreement with President Morales' decision to run for a fourth presidential term despite the fact that the populace had rejected the abolition of term limits in a 2016 referendum. "... Morales himself told us that 'government must listen to the people' and unfortunately he did not", she stated. In 2015, UN Women designated Salguero as an international expert in strategic planning for Bolivia. Her work focuses on implementing laws punishing violence against women and the economic empowerment of women in the workplace.

== Electoral history ==
Electoral history of Elizabeth Salguero
Year	Office	Party	Votes			Result	Ref.
Year	Office	Party	Total	%	P.	Result	Ref.
2005	Deputy	Movement for Socialism	640,880	66.63%	1st (Note: Presented on an electoral list. The data shown represents the share of the vote the entire party/alliance received in that constituency.)	Won	
2009	Deputy	Movement for Socialism	1,099,259	80.28%	1st	Won	
2010	Mayor	Movement for Socialism	162,667	34.93%	2nd	Lost	
Source: Plurinational Electoral Organ | Electoral Atlas

Chamber of Deputies of Bolivia
Preceded by Dante Pino	Member of the Chamber of Deputies from La Paz; 2006–2010	Succeeded by Gilda Oporto
Political offices
Preceded by Zulma Yugar	Minister of Cultures; 2011–2012	Succeeded by Pablo Groux
Diplomatic posts
Preceded by Walter Magne	Ambassador of Bolivia to Germany; 2012–2015	Succeeded by Jorge Cárdenas
