= Mónica Velásquez =

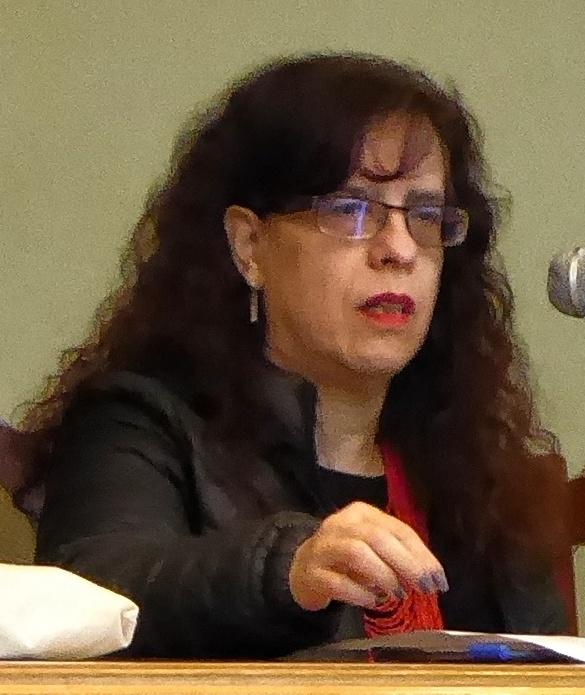
- At the 12th Congress of the Association of Bolivian Studies in 2025
- Born: Mónica Velásquez Guzmán; 9 October 1972 (age 53); La Paz, Bolivia
- Education: Higher University of San Andrés; El Colegio de México
- Occupations: Poet, academic, literary critic
- Awards: Yolanda Bedregal National Poetry Award (2007); Chevalier of the Ordre des Arts et des Lettres (2017)

Mónica Velásquez Guzmán (born 9 October 1972) is a Bolivian poet, researcher, university professor and literary critic. She is known primarily for her work in criticism, essay writing, editing, teaching, fighting discrimination, and supporting youth.

Outlets such as Opinión have placed her among the most important voices in 21st-century Bolivian literature, and biographer Elías Blanco Mamani named her "leader of a new generation of Bolivian literary critics."

== Biography ==
Mónica Velásquez was born in La Paz on 9 October 1972. She earned a licentiate in literature at the Higher University of San Andrés. During this period, she met the poet Blanca Wiethüchter. She later specialized, obtaining master's and doctoral degrees in Latin American literature from El Colegio de México.

Regarding her work, the researcher and poet Virginia Ayllón wrote:

There is a strength in Mónica's verse that I want to highlight for you, one that possibly comes from the anguish she experiences when she lets herself flow in the tortuous river that the poetic journey often is. There is a candid, naive, and yet committed loyalty in Mónica's writing.

Velásquez has taught at the Higher University of San Andrés and the Universidad Católica de San Pablo. She initiated the Street Poetry Festival, held in the city of La Paz between 2005 and 2009. In 2010, she began the project "La crítica y el poeta" (Criticism and the Poet), an initiative dedicated to the research and study of Bolivian poetry, which aimed to publish monographs on the subject.

== Awards and recognition ==
- International Writing Program fellowship in Iowa, 1997
- Yolanda Bedregal National Poetry Award, 2007
- Chevalier of the Ordre des Arts et des Lettres, 2017

== Works ==
=== La crítica y el poeta ===
The project "La crítica y el poeta" (Criticism and the Poet) was carried out from 2010 to 2017, comprising 11 volumes:
- La crítica y el poeta: Jaime Saenz. Carrera de Literatura-UMSA, 2011.
- La crítica y el poeta: Oscar Cerruto. Carrera de Literatura-UMSA. 2011.
- La crítica y el poeta: Edmundo Camargo. Carrera de Literatura-UMSA, 2011.
- La crítica y el poeta: Blanca Wiethüchter. Carrera de Literatura-UMSA, 2011.
- La crítica y el poeta: Ricardo Jaime Freyre
- La crítica y el poeta: Franz Tamayo
- La crítica y el poeta: Adela Zamudio
- La crítica y el poeta: Raul Otero Reiche
- La crítica y el poeta: Eduardo Mitre
- La crítica y el poeta: Pedro Shimose
- La crítica y el poeta: Octavio Campero Echazú

=== Poetry ===
- Tres nombres para un lugar, 1995
- Fronteras de doble filo, 1998
- El viento de los náufragos, 2005
- Hija de Medea, 2008 (Yolanda Bedregal National Poetry Award)
- La sed donde bebes, 2011
- Abdicar de lucidez, 2016

=== Literary criticism ===
- Múltiples voces en la poesía de Francisco Hernández, Blanca Wiethüchter y Raúl Zurita, 2009
- Demoníaco afán. Lecturas de poesía latinoamericana, 2010
- La crítica y el poeta: siglo XIX, 2019
- Tres citas impuntuales. Tiempo, poesía y falta, 2021
- Un presente abierto 24 horas, 2023

=== Editing ===
- Antología de la poesía boliviana: Ordenar la danza, 2004
- Poesía completa de Yolanda Bedregal, 2009
- Obra poética de Oscar Cerruto, 2009
- Vibra aún el arpa muda. Antología de poesía boliviana del siglo XIX, 2019
- Poesía en Bolivia (1990–2023), 2024
