= Yolanda Bedregal National Poetry Award =

- Native name: Premio Nacional de Poesía Yolanda Bedregal
- Country: Bolivia
- First award: 2001

The Yolanda Bedregal National Poetry Award (Premio Nacional de Poesía Yolanda Bedregal) is part of Bolivia's National Literature Awards.

== History ==
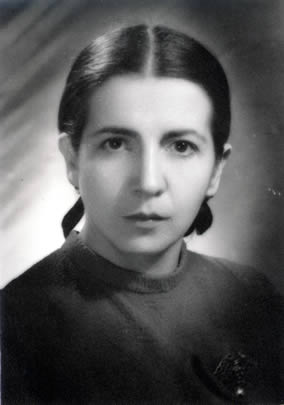
Yolanda Bedregal

The award was created in 2000 by Supreme Resolution No. 220062 of the Bolivian government, in homage to the poet and novelist Yolanda Bedregal, with the objective of recognizing and promoting literary activity in the genre of poetry in Bolivia.

It is awarded annually by the Bolivian Ministry of Cultures, in conjunction with the government of La Paz Department, the Conitzer Bedregal Family, and the publishing house Plural editores. The prize includes a cash sum, a gold medal, a certificate of honor, and publication of the winning poetry collection. Bolivian citizens over the age of 18 are eligible to apply with unpublished works that have not been previously awarded or mentioned in other competitions.

In 2018, 62 works were submitted for evaluation.

== Winners ==
| Year | Name | Pseudonym | Poetry collection | Works presented | Refs |
|---|---|---|---|---|---|
| 2001 | Jorge Campero | | Musa en Jeans Descoloridos | | |
| 2002 | Jorge Campero | | Jaguar Azul | | |
| 2003 | José Terán Cabero | | Murciélago boca abajo | | |
| 2004 | Miguel Ángel Aranda | | Licantropía | | |
| 2005 | Camila Urioste | | Diario de Alicia | | |
| 2006 | Benjamín Chávez | | Pequeña librería de viejo | | |
| 2007 | Mónica Velásquez | Malva | Hija de Medea | 72 | |
| 2008 | Christian Vera | Dashiell Hammett | Ciudad Trilce | 80 | |
| 2010 | Jorge Alejandro Suárez | | El espéculo | | |
| 2012 | (not given) | | | 47 | |
| 2013 | Vadik Barrón | | El arte de la fuga | | |
| 2017 | Flavia Lima | | Masochistics | 50 | |
| 2018 | Anuar Elías Pérez | | Simulacro de Mudanza | 62 | |
| 2019 | Paola Senseve Tejada | | Codex Corpus | | |

== See also ==
- National Novel Award (Bolivia)
