= Pablo Groux =

Bolivian Minister of Cultures (2009–2010; 2012–2015)

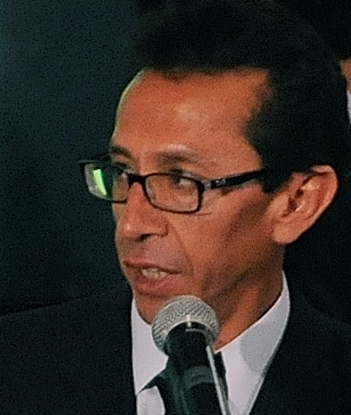

Minister of Cultures and Tourism
- In office 25 September 2012 – 19 February 2015
- President: Evo Morales
- Preceded by: Himself
- Succeeded by: Marko Machicao

Minister of Cultures
- In office 23 January 2012 – 25 September 2012
- President: Evo Morales
- Preceded by: Elizabeth Salguero
- Succeeded by: Himself
- In office 8 February 2009 – 23 January 2010
- President: Evo Morales
- Preceded by: Office established
- Succeeded by: Zulma Yugar

Personal details
- Born: Pablo César Groux Canedo; 29 June 1968 (age 56); La Paz, Bolivia
- Political party: Fearless Movement

Pablo César Groux Canedo (born 29 June 1969) is the former Minister of Cultures and Tourism in Bolivia. He previously worked as a reporter for the newspaper Presencia in 1994–1995, an investigator for Fundación Tierra from 1995 to 2000, and as an official in the La Paz Municipality. He served as the Cabinet Chief in the office of the Mayor of the City of La Paz from 2000 to 2005, and then as Official mayor of Culture from 2005 to 2007. During the latter role, La Paz was the Iberoamerican Capital of Culture.

Groux was appointed by President Evo Morales as the Vice Minister for Development of Cultures, which was then within the Ministry of Education and Cultures. He was elevated to the head of the newly created Ministry of Cultures in February 2009 and has twice served as its leader, the first time for 11 months ending in January 2010, and the second time from January 2012 to 20 February 2015.

Groux was the coordinator of the World Peoples' Summit on Climate Change and the Rights of Mother Earth in Cochabamba in 2010. He served as Bolivia's Ambassador to UNESCO from 5 July 2010, until his re-appointment as Minister of Cultures in 2012.

President Morales publicly criticized Groux for errors in his administration in February 2015, shortly before replacing him with Marko Machicao. In stepping down, Groux tweeted, "I feel grateful and honored to have supported Evo, sincerely congratulate Marko Machicao, and will continue to work for Bolivia forever."

Political offices
Office established	Minister of Cultures; 2009–2010	Succeeded by Zulma Yugar
Preceded by Elizabeth Salguero	Minister of Cultures; 2012	Succeeded by Himself
Preceded by Himself	Minister of Cultures and Tourism; 2012–2015	Succeeded by Marko Machicao
