= Martha Yujra =

Bolivian politician (born 1964)

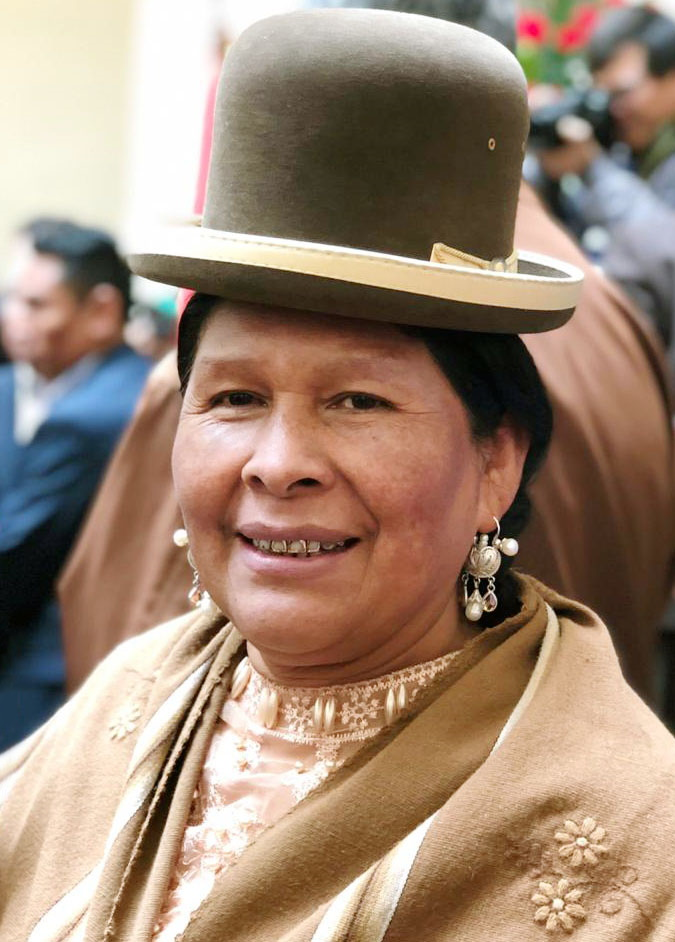

Minister of Cultures and Tourism
- In office 14 November 2019 – 4 June 2020
- President: Jeanine Áñez
- Preceded by: Wilma Alanoca
- Succeeded by: Office abolished (Note: Sabina Orellana, as minister of cultures, decolonization, and depatriarchalization; nominally Víctor Hugo Cárdenas, as minister of education, sports, and cultures; and partially Marcelo Bazán, as vice minister of interculturality.)

Personal details
- Born: Martha Yujra Apaza; 19 January 1964 (age 62) La Chojlla, La Paz, Bolivia
- Occupation: Diplomat; politician; trade unionist

Martha Yujra Apaza (born 19 January 1964) is a Bolivian politician and trade unionist who served as minister of cultures and tourism from 2019 to 2020. A prominent trade union leader in El Alto, Yujra was the only indigenous member of the Jeanine Áñez Cabinet and was the final official to head the Ministry of Cultures and Tourism; the institution was abolished during her term. During her tenure, Yujra's office primarily dealt with the effects of the COVID-19 pandemic on the cultural sector, devising means of alleviating the economic ramifications of quarantine measures on artisans and entertainers. She subsequently served as a counselor at the Embassy of Bolivia in Quito from July to November 2020. Prior to serving as minister, Yujra gained notoriety for her fierce opposition to the government of Evo Morales. In 2017, she led a breakaway faction of the pro-government El Alto Regional Workers' Center. As its executive secretary, Yujra aligned the union with the Bolivia Says No alliance, running unsuccessfully to represent La Paz in the Chamber of Deputies in the annulled 2019 general elections.

== Early life and career ==
Martha Yujra was born on 19 January 1964 in La Chojlla, a small mining community situated in the La Paz Yungas. An ethnic Aymara by descent, Yujra's mother died when she was seven; consequently, she was raised by her father, a local mineworker. From the age of 17, she was trained in trade union leadership, serving as a student representative in the Chojlla mine. There, she actively rebelled against the traditional machismo gender roles imposed by her community, seeking to pursue a career in the organized labor movement.

In her adolescence, Yujra moved to El Alto, where she studied at the Eduardo Abaroa School, later graduating from the Simón Bolívar Educational Unit. Some time thereafter, Yujra began a lengthy career in trade unionism; in 2000, she joined the Parent Federation before briefly becoming a member of the Bartolina Sisa Federation. Later on, Yujra became an active member of the Regional Workers' Center of El Alto (COR-El Alto), remaining involved in that organization for over a decade. Despite her tenure, she often faced typical patriarchal attitudes from her comrades: "at first, in the COR, my colleagues sent me to the store [even though] I was their peer. Until I stopped and said: women are to be respected". As a member of the COR, Yujra was present during the turbulent period of social unrest that El Alto experienced during the Bolivian gas conflict, which culminated in the fall from power of President Gonzalo Sánchez de Lozada in October 2003.

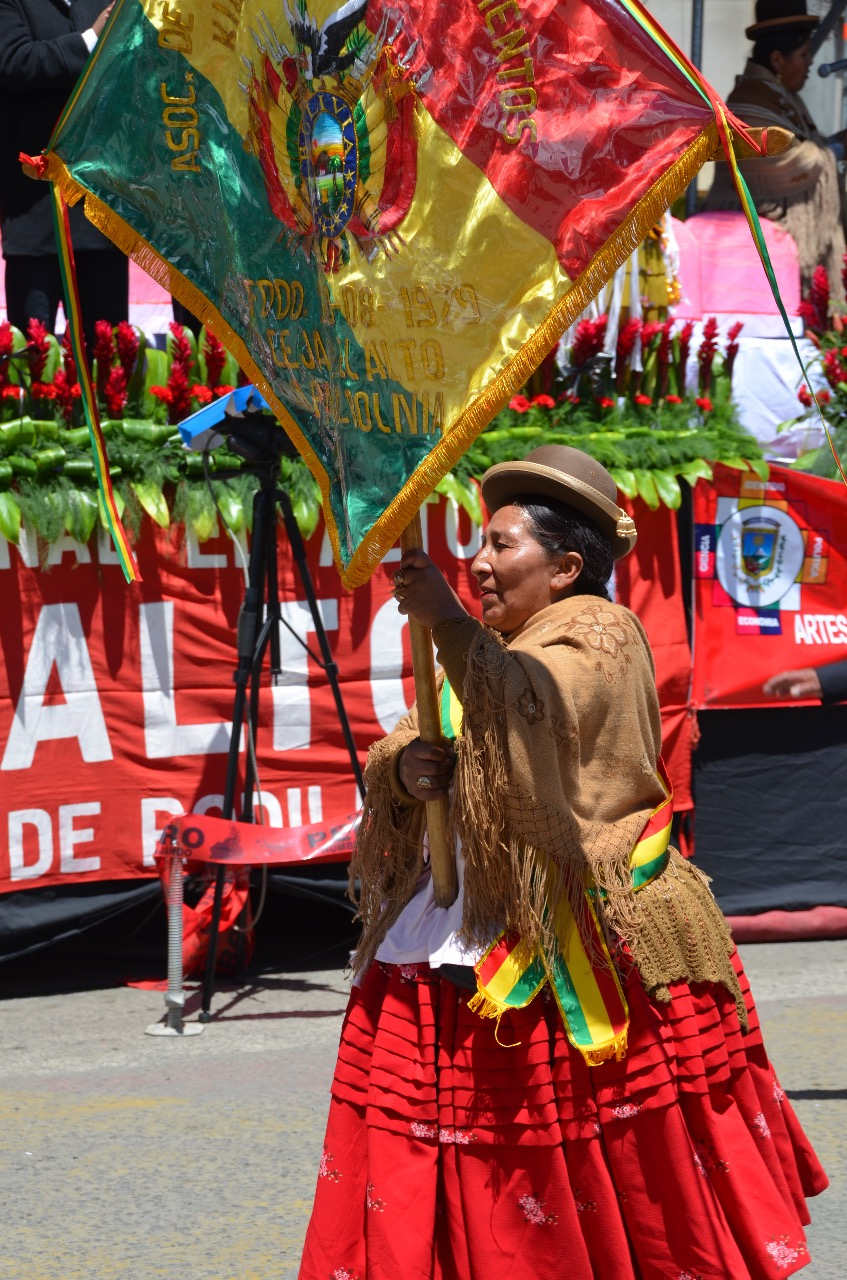
A COR unionist hoists the Bolivian tricolor at a parade, 4 March 2020.

Through her activism, Yujra came to be well known in El Alto, gaining particular notoriety for her vocal criticism of President Evo Morales, a figure typically revered by labor sectors. As such, her positions occasionally put her at odds with the COR, which aligned itself with Morales's party, the Movement for Socialism (MAS-IPSP). In 2015, Yujra actively opposed Mayor Edgar Patana in his COR-supported bid for reelection, stating that his management had set the city back by half a decade. As a representative of the Neighborhood Civic Movement, she signed a political alliance to support the mayoral campaign of Soledad Chapetón, who ultimately denied Patana a second term in that year's municipal election.

Yujra's definitive break with the COR came in June 2017, when she was declared executive secretary of the COR in a congress she herself convened, challenging the rule of Eliseo Suxo, a former pro-government parliamentarian, who had enacted a series of mechanisms to prolong his term in power. The move split the COR into two factions, with both Yujra and Suxo declaring themselves the legitimate executive secretaries of the entire organization. To this was added a third faction led by Pedro Chinche, affiliated with the Chapetón administration. On 8 December, the COR's pro-government faction expelled Yujra from its ranks, accusing her of making commitments with political parties in violation of the union's statute of neutrality.

Despite her removal, Yujra's rival union continued to operate in the city. In the leadup to the 2019 general election, Yujra's COR participated in numerous opposition-led mobilizations, rejecting President Morales's re-nomination to a fourth term, which contravened a 2016 referendum that voted down the abolition of term limits. With the slogan of 21F, (Note: 21F (21 February) is an opposition political slogan referring to the date of the 2016 constitutional referendum, in which a majority of Bolivians voted against extending term limits.) Yujra led marches across El Alto, stating that "the Alteño people have joined this fight because democracy also belongs to the Alteños". In January of that year, Yujra participated in a seven-day hunger strike against the president, only lifting the measure at the urgent request of medical staff. During the campaign, she supported the presidential candidacy of Senator Oscar Ortiz, with her faction of the COR becoming a component of his Bolivia Says No (BDN) alliance. BDN nominated Yujra as a candidate for deputy from La Paz, placing her second on its electoral list.

Ultimately, the BDN alliance failed to gain substantial traction in the La Paz Department, attaining only 1.19 percent of the vote. By the time the official count in La Paz concluded, however, Bolivia had entered a period of widespread unrest driven by accusations of electoral fraud at the national level. Amid nationwide civic strikes, Yujra's COR led demonstrations in El Alto, demanding the resignation of the members of the Supreme Electoral Tribunal, whom she referred to as "traitors of the homeland". After twenty-one days of protests, the so-called Pitita Revolution culminated in the resignation of Morales and his government.

== Minister of Cultures ==
Morales was succeeded by opposition senator Jeanine Áñez, who quickly moved to form an ad hoc cabinet to oversee a caretaker government. On 14 November 2019, two days after assuming office, Áñez appointed Yujra to head the Ministry of Cultures and Tourism. Yujra was the only indigenous member of the Áñez Cabinet, a point she highlighted at her swearing-in ceremony, where she "[committed], as a woman in a pollera, ... to continue fighting for a country united in diversity". In her speech, she also declared that "it is women's time. We are the ones who take the reins of this country"; in its history, Áñez was only Bolivia's second female head of state.

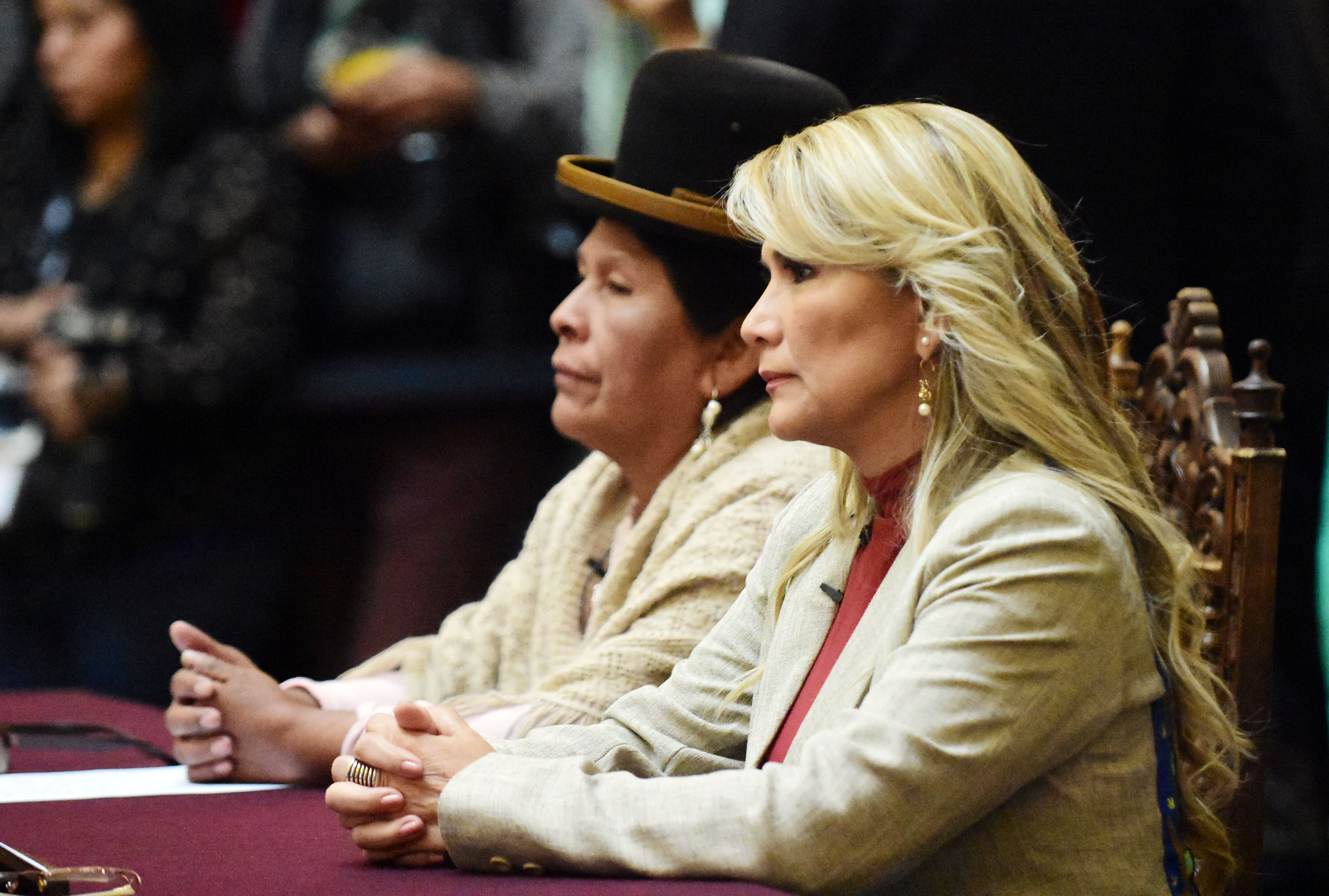
Áñez, flanked to her right by Yujra, in the Palacio Quemado, 19 November 2019.

Following her inauguration, amid continued social unrest in the country, Yujra presented herself as a mediator in the government's dialogue with labor sectors in El Alto. On 18 November, she traveled to the city to meet with leaders of neighborhood associations, seeking to negotiate an end to antigovernment demonstrations. Talks were partially successful, with most of El Alto's labor leaders agreeing to demobilize. However, more radical sectors maintained pressure measures, culminating in a police-led massacre in the Senkata barrio. Yujra blamed much of the unrest on supporters of the previous government, accusing ruling party members of forcing Alteños to participate in protests. Additionally, Yujra's administration cooperated with prosecutors in a criminal process against her predecessor, Wilma Alanoca, who stood accused of directing acts of violence in the city.

In her first major action as minister, Yujra endeavored to achieve official State recognition of Bolivia's indigenous chola community. On 27 January 2020, in a ceremony attended by dignitaries of various chola groups, Áñez signed a draft bill commemorating cholas from five departments and the Afro-Bolivian community, recognizing their identities as part of the country's intangible cultural heritage. For her part, Yujra—herself a chola—stated that "with this law, women in polleras are going to have a place that corresponds to us".

Under the slogan "a culture of peace and unity to heal", the Ministry of Cultures and Tourism launched the 2020 carnival celebration. The festival's inaugural act was held at the Viru Viru International Airport, featuring a flash mob of dancers, invited authorities—including Yujra—and other guests, all of whom shared in the festivities inside commercial aircraft. Throughout the celebration, Yujra's ministry worked in partnership with the private sector, seeking to promote tourism to the country.

At the onset of the COVID-19 pandemic, Yujra's administration faced the impact of quarantine measures on the country's artists and entertainers. On 28 April, the Ministry of Cultures held a web conference with delegates from different entertainment sectors, in which viable solutions to face the difficult situation were outlined. Nonetheless, Yujra was criticized for failing to adequately meet the needs of artists, with opponents stating that her ministry lacked sound management throughout the pandemic. Additionally, the Federation of Neighborhood Councils of El Alto accused Yujra of not coordinating anti-COVID measures with local authorities, despite her being appointed as a presidential delegate to the city for that very purpose.

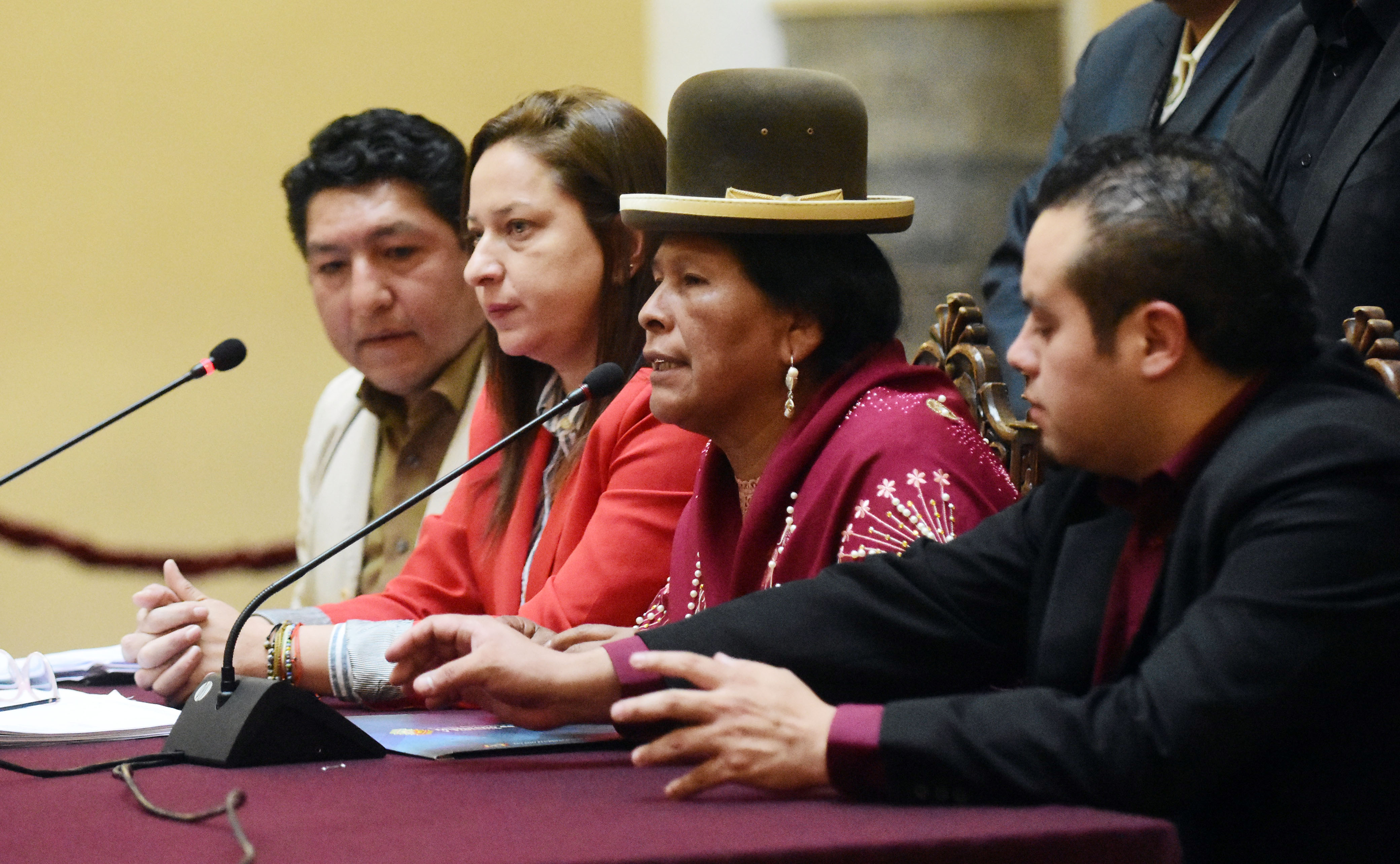
Yujra and her vice ministers at a press conference, 27 December 2019.

In the final days of her administration, Yujra authorized the grant, on a ninety-year loan, of La Sombrerería Cultural Center to the Central Bank of Bolivia's Cultural Foundation. Located in Sucre, La Sombrerería is the country's largest piece of cultural infrastructure, equipped with multiple theater rooms, a children's museum, and outdoor venues, all capable of housing hundreds of people. The cultural center was inaugurated in October 2019 but remained closed since, coinciding with the political crisis initiated at the time. Yujra considered that the loan—authorized through Supreme Decree N° 4243—would charge more capable officials with maintaining the property, allowing it to finally reopen after months of disuse.

Yujra's term in office lasted until 4 June, when it was terminated following Áñez's decision to permanently abolish three ministries; among them, the Ministry of Cultures and Tourism, which was merged with the Ministry of Education. The president characterized the decision as a cost-saving measure intended to conserve resources to combat the COVID-19 pandemic. In an interview with Página Siete, Yujra noted that she had not been consulted about the decision to close the ministry: "the truth, it [was] a surprise for me, ... I just had to accept it". The ex-minister considered the decision a mistake, expressing her hope that the ministry be reinstated, perhaps merged with the Ministry of Sports, which was also abolished. Yujra was nominally succeeded by Víctor Hugo Cárdenas, minister of education, though the vice ministry of interculturality—charged with heading the cultures portfolio—remained vacant for three months, with Marcelo Bazán being appointed to head it in September.

Two months after her removal from office, in late July, Áñez appointed Yujra to serve as a counselor in the Bolivian Embassy in Quito, Ecuador. Following the snap 2020 general elections and the return to power of the MAS, pro-government sectors from El Alto, La Paz, and surrounding provinces profiled Yujra among their list of more than thirty collaborators in the "coup d'état" of 2019, requesting that the Prosecutor's Office initiate criminal investigations against them. For her part, following her term as a counselor, Yujra retired to her residence in El Alto, affirming that she had no intention of leaving the country or going into hiding: "he who does nothing fears nothing. I have no reason to hide, why hide?"

== Electoral history ==
Electoral history of Martha Yujra
Year	Office	Alliance	Votes			Result	Ref.
Year	Office	Alliance	Total	%	P.	Result	Ref.
2019	Deputy	Bolivia Says No	19,892	1.19%	5th	Annulled	(Note: Presented on an electoral list. The data shown represents the share of the vote the entire party/alliance received in that constituency.)
Source: Plurinational Electoral Organ | Electoral Atlas

Political offices
Preceded by Wilma Alanoca	Minister of Cultures and Tourism; 2019–2020	Office abolished Víctor Hugo Cárdenas as Minister of Education
