= Alasitas =

Miniature figurines in Aymara ritual culture

Alasitas Feria de la Alasita
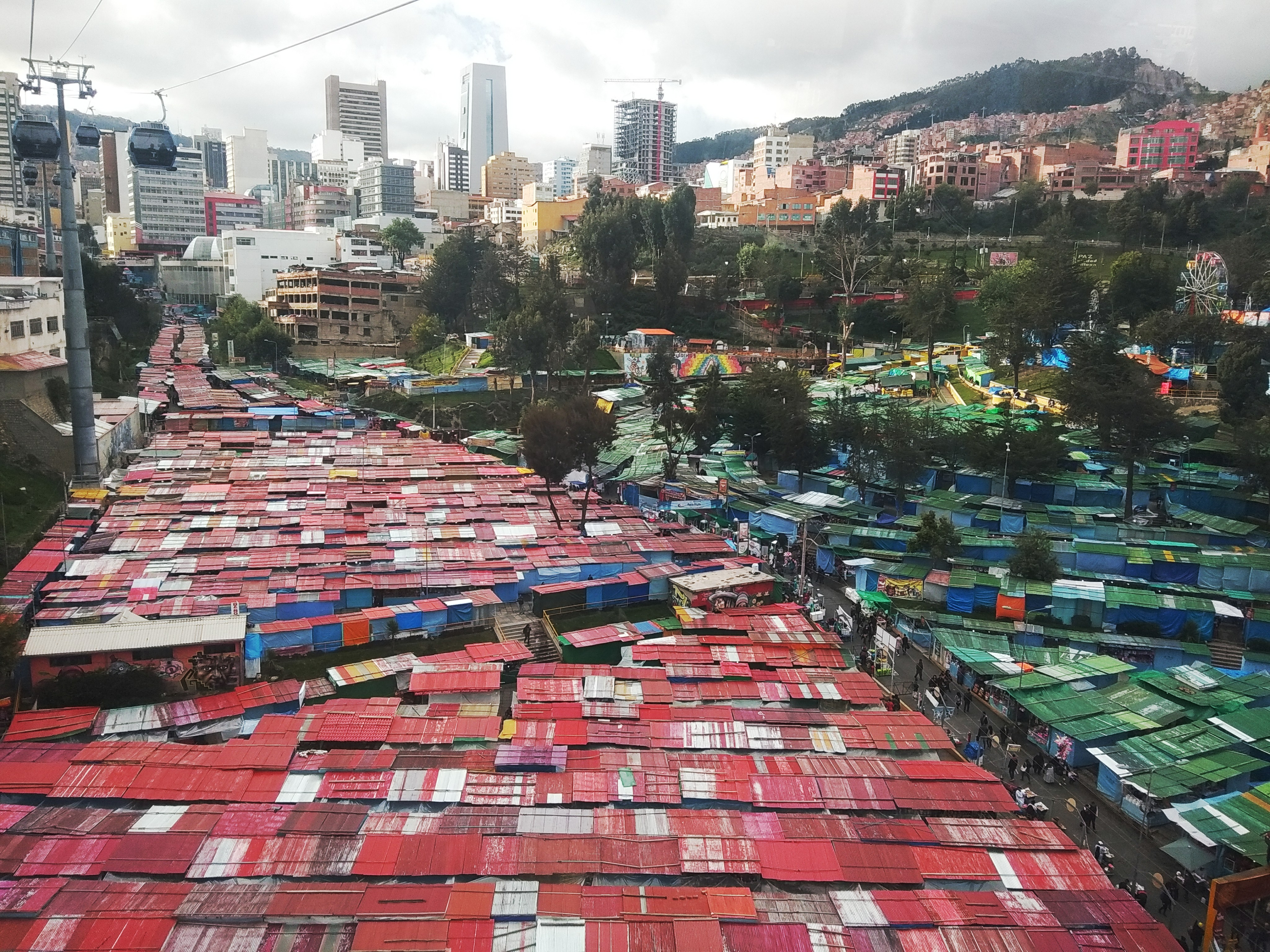
- View of Las Alasitas from the cable car of La Paz
- Dates: 24 January
- Frequency: annual
- Location: La Paz
- Country: Bolivia

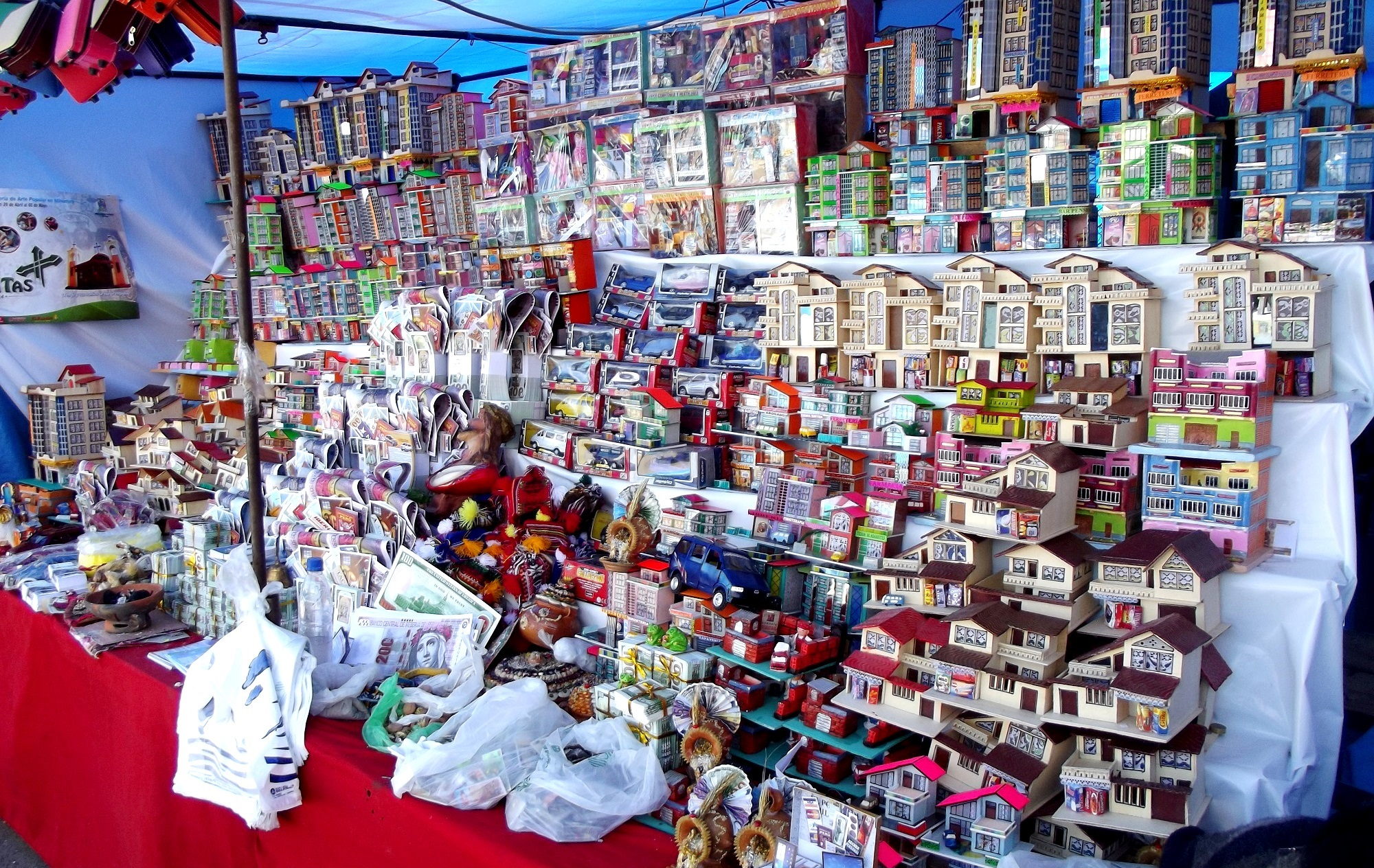
Miniatures at the Alasitas Festival, Puno

The largest Alasitas fair (or Alacita, Alacitas, Alasita; Spanish: Feria de las Alasitas) is an annual month-long cultural event starting on 24 January in La Paz, Bolivia. It honours Ekeko, the Aymara god of abundance, and is noted for the giving of miniature items. Other fiestas and ferias throughout Bolivia incorporate alasitas into religious observances: The Fiesta of the Virgin of Copacabana and the Fiesta of the Virgin of Urkupiña, for example.

== Origins ==
The indigenous Aymara people observed an event called Guyatt in the pre-Columbian era, when people prayed for good crops and exchanged basic goods. Over time, it evolved to accommodate elements of Catholicism and Western acquisitiveness. Its name is the Aymara word for "buy from me".

Arthur Posnansky observed that in the Tiwanaku culture, on dates near 22 December, the population used to worship their deities to ask for good luck, offering miniatures of what they wished to have or achieve.

Based on Posnansky's observations, the manufacture of miniatures would have its origins in the pre-Columbian era and the Alasitas fair would have its first urban expressions in the early years of the founding of La Paz, specifically, when its founders moved it from Laja on the banks of the Choqueyapu River. During that occasion, Juan Rodríguez ordered the celebration of a mass where Spanish and Indigenous people participated, the latter wanted to contribute by bringing small stone idols and miniatures exchanging them for stone coins.

During the 1781 siege of La Paz, Sebastián Segurola re-established the celebration moving it from October to 24 January, as a gesture of gratitude towards Our Lady of Peace, the holy figure for which the city of La Paz was named. The transactions were made with the same stone coins and slowly the cult to the Ekeko was reintroduced. He appeared for the first time modelled in clay; nowadays, the figures are usually cast in plaster.

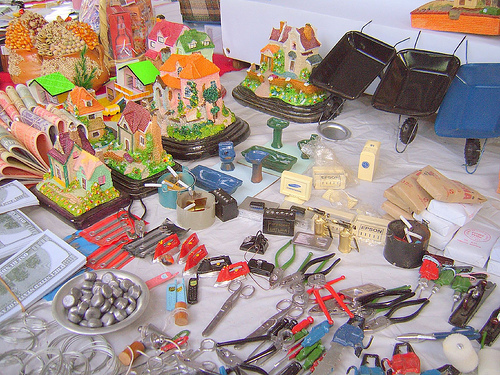
Miniatures at the Alasitas festival

== Modern celebrations ==
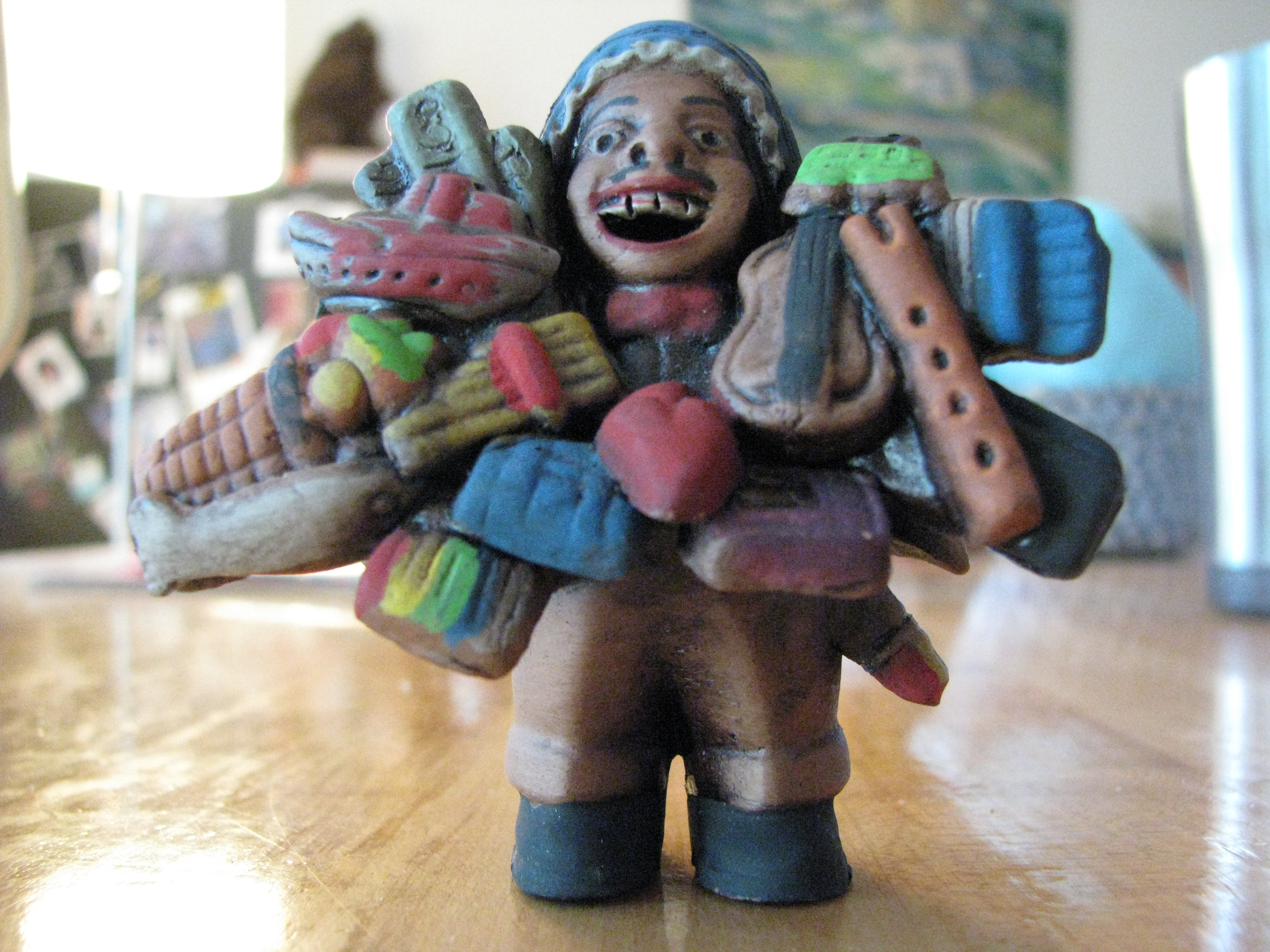

The Alasitas festival is held annually for the Ekeko. It sprawls along many streets and parks in central La Paz and smaller events are held in many neighborhoods around the city. People attend the event from all over the city and even travel from other cities inside Bolivia to buy miniature versions of goods they would like to give to somebody else. These goods can be blessed by any one of the men and (less frequently) women acting as shaman. It is believed that if somebody gives a miniature version, the recipient will get the real object in the course of the following year. Examples of goods that can be bought are household items, food, computers, construction materials, cell phones, houses, cars, university diplomas and even figures of domestic workers (whom the recipient might hope to employ).

At mid-day on 24 January, the Catholic Church joins in the celebration by blessing the gifts at the main cathedral in La Paz.

This spring festival also celebrates the "abundance" or fecundity of humanity.

In March 2011 Elizabeth Salguero, Minister of Cultures, nominated Alasitas along with two other Bolivian festivals to UNESCO for World Heritage recognition as part of the cultural and intangible heritage of humanity.

In the year 2016 the Feast of Alasita and miniatures of the Altiplano of Puno was declared Cultural Heritage of the Nation of Peru, This declaration supports that the alasitas fairs and the ritual use of propitiatory miniatures are part of the Intangible Cultural Heritage of Peru.

== See also ==
- Ekeko
