= Sabina Orellana =

Bolivian Minister of Cultures

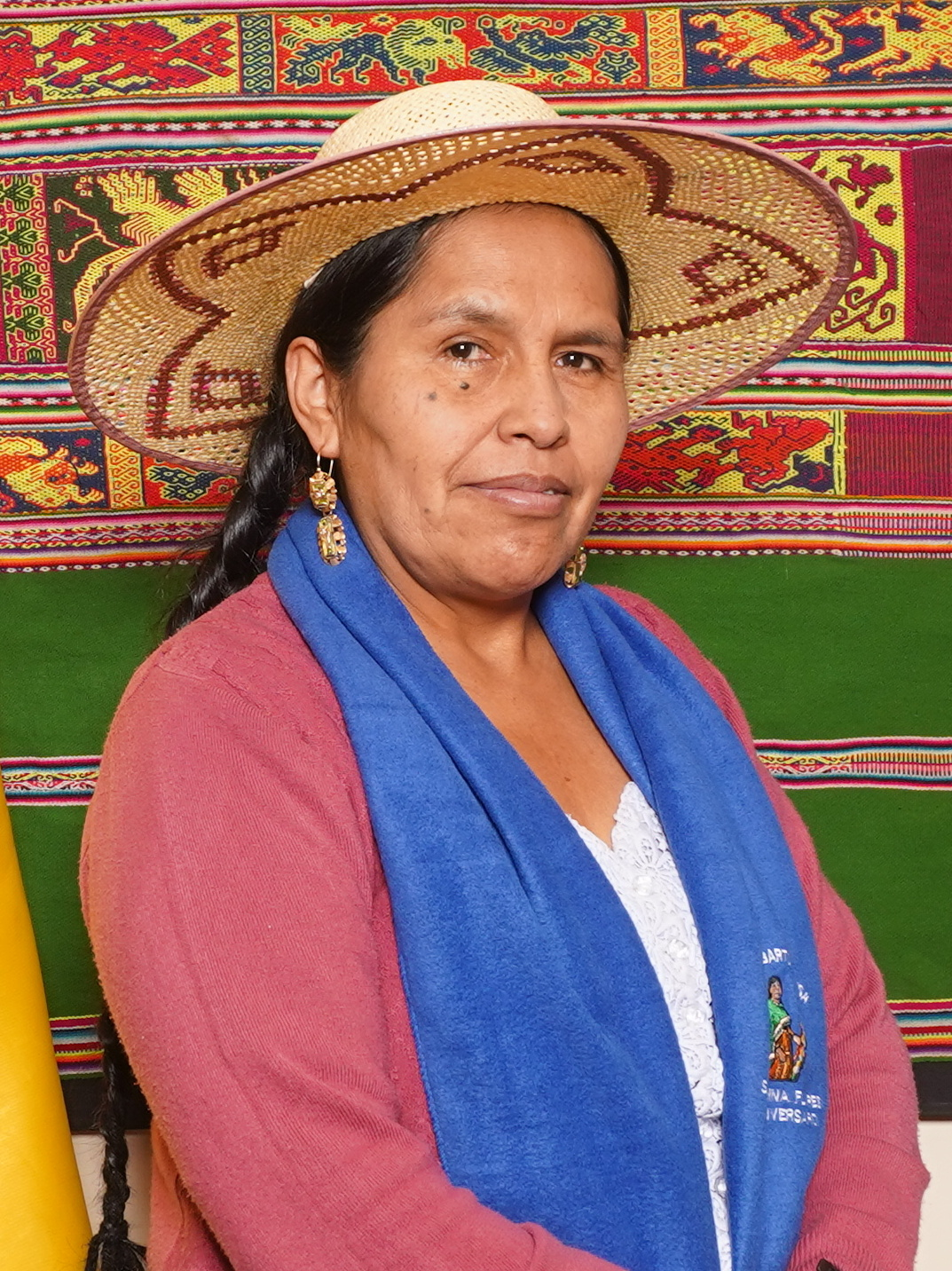
- Orellana in 2021

Minister of Cultures, Decolonization, and Depatriarchalization
- In office 20 November 2020 – 4 March 2024
- President: Luis Arce
- Preceded by: Martha Yujra (as minister of cultures and tourism)
- Succeeded by: Esperanza Guevara

Personal details
- Born: Sabina Orellana Cruz; 1970 (age 55–56) Vacas, Cochabamba, Bolivia
- Party: Movement for Socialism

Sabina Orellana Cruz (born 1970) is a Bolivian unionist and politician of Quechua origin who served as Minister of Cultures, Decolonization and Depatriarchalization under President Luis Arce from 2020 to 2024. She is a member of the Bartolina Sisa Confederation of indigenous women.

== Biography ==
Sabina Orellana was born in 1970. Of Quechua origin, she was raised in Vacas, Cochabamba. From 1993 to 2004, Orellana worked as a reporter for Radio Chualake dealing with issues of the environment, municipalities, education, health, and gender. In addition, she assumed responsibilities as a leader of the Departmental Federation of Women of Cochabamba.

From 2005 to 2008, Orellana was a leading member of the Bartolina Sisa Confederation of women. From 1995, she was a member of a faction within the Assembly for the Sovereignty of the Peoples (ASP) which eventually split into the Movement for Socialism (MAS).

== Minister of Cultures ==
On 20 November 2020, President Luis Arce restored the Ministry of Cultures and Tourism which had been dissolved by the previous administration of Jeanine Áñez on 4 June. The Ministry was redubbed the Ministry of Cultures, Decolonization and Depatriarchalization with the stated intention to "decolonize and de-patriarchalize [and to] reverse this inequality between nationalities, as well as between men and women." Orellana was appointed to head the ministry making her the only indigenous representative within the Arce cabinet.

=== Political positions ===
A few minutes after being sworn into her ministerial position, Orellana announced an investigation against the groups Unión Juvenil Cruceñista (UJC) and the Resistencia Juvenil Cochala (RJC) for having incurred in racism and discrimination towards indigenous women in 2019 and 2020. In addition, Orellana declared that during her tenure in the ministry, she would work to promote the Wiphala as a national symbol, regretting that it had been burned during the 2019 crisis after the resignation of the president Evo Morales.

On 19 May 2021, Orellana publicly asked the Ministry of Foreign Affairs of Bolivia to proceed to cut Bolivia–United States relations, claiming that the government in Washington "attacks Bolivian sovereignty". A year later, she attended a U.S. Embassy ceremony in which the U.S. government arranged for the return of pre-Columbian ceramic artifacts that had been stolen from Bolivia.

She was dismissed by President Arce in March 2024 and replaced by Esperanza Guevara.

Political offices
Vacant Office abolished Title last held by Martha Yujra	Minister of Cultures, Decolonization and Depatriarchalization; 2020–present	Incumbent
