= Ekeko =

God of abundance in Altiplano mythology

- God of abundance
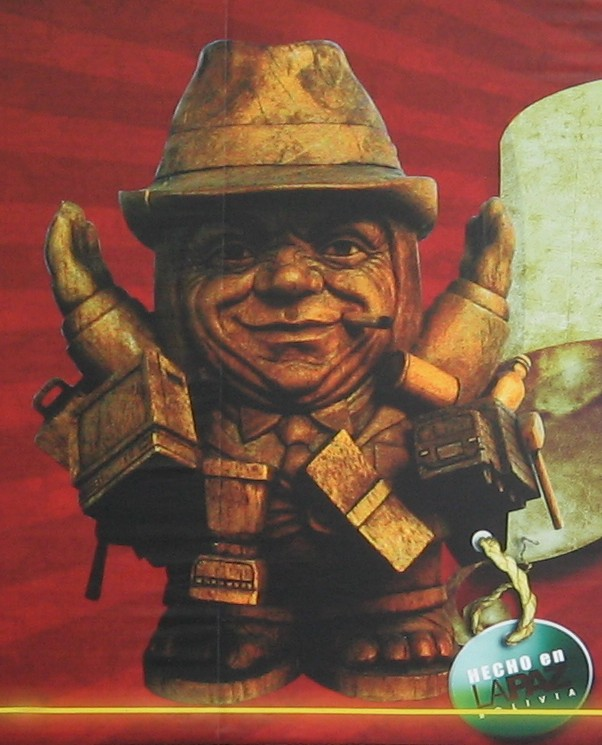
- Other names: Aymara: iqiqu Quechua: ekjakjo
- Region: Andean high plateau
- Ethnic group: Aymara
- Festivals: Alasitas

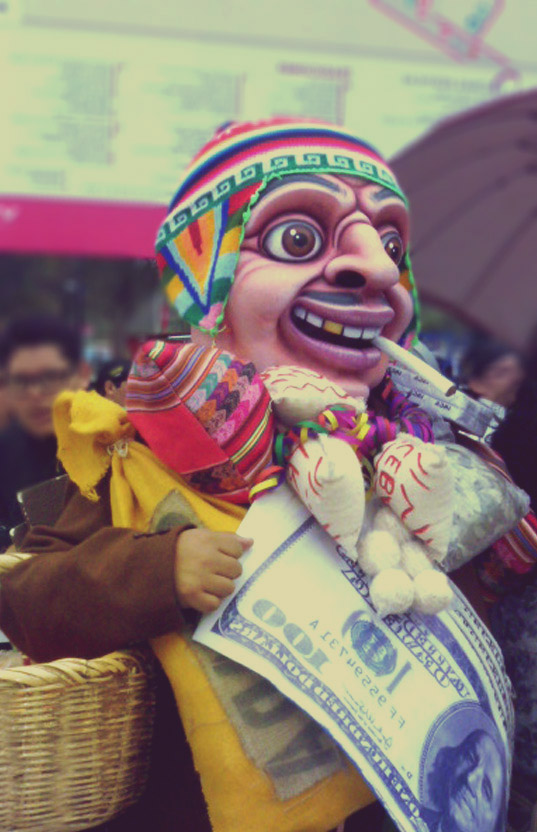
Representation of the Ekeko in La Paz, Bolivia

The Ekeko (contemporary Aymara spelling: Iqiqu) is the Tiwanakan (pre-Columbian civilization) god of abundance and prosperity in the mythology and folklore of the people from the Altiplano. Its chief importance in popular culture is as the main figure of the annual Alasitas fair, a cultural event that happens every January 24 in La Paz, Bolivia. The Ekeko is a traditional god of luck and prosperity popular in the western region of Bolivia. In Peru the main festival is celebrated on May 3 of every year in the city of Puno, on the Machallata hill.

== Etymology ==
The name Ekeko comes from the alteration of the original term Ekhako or Eqaqo, popularized as Ekhekho which was the ancient god of fortune and prosperity in the Qullasuyu. The Ekhako was often invoked when a disgrace disturbed their homes.

== Origins ==
=== Pre-Columbian references ===
The scholar Ernesto Cavour in his book Alasitas makes reference to anthropomorphic and zoomorphic stone, mud and gold figures that were found in the areas belonging to the Bolivian departments of La Paz, Oruro and Potosí. Cavour considers that these figures were made using basalt—extracted from the pre-Columbian mines in the shores of the Lake Poopó—and andesite from the Copacabana peninsula.

Carlos Ponce Sanginés, for his part, focus his researches in the anthropomorphic figures with phallic elements and prominent humps which, in his opinion, go back to the Inca civilization and, according to his observations, they would correspond to the predecessors of the colonial Ekeko.

The historian Antonio Paredes Candia considers that these figures would be the remains of ancient sacred festivities during the summer solstice in the Southern Hemisphere. Arthur Posnansky also observes that in dates near the 22 December, in the Tiwanaku culture, the population used to worship their deities to ask for good luck, offering miniatures of what they wished to have or achieve.

=== Modern era ===
After some controversy, the Bernisches Historisches Museum in Switzerland restituted a statuette, which the Aymara consider an Ekeko, to Bolivia in 2014, where it was then celebrated in the context of the Alasitas festival. It had been illegitimately appropriated by the Swiss naturalist Johann Jakob von Tschudi in the 19th century and is estimated to be around 2,000 years old.

== Characteristics ==
=== Description ===
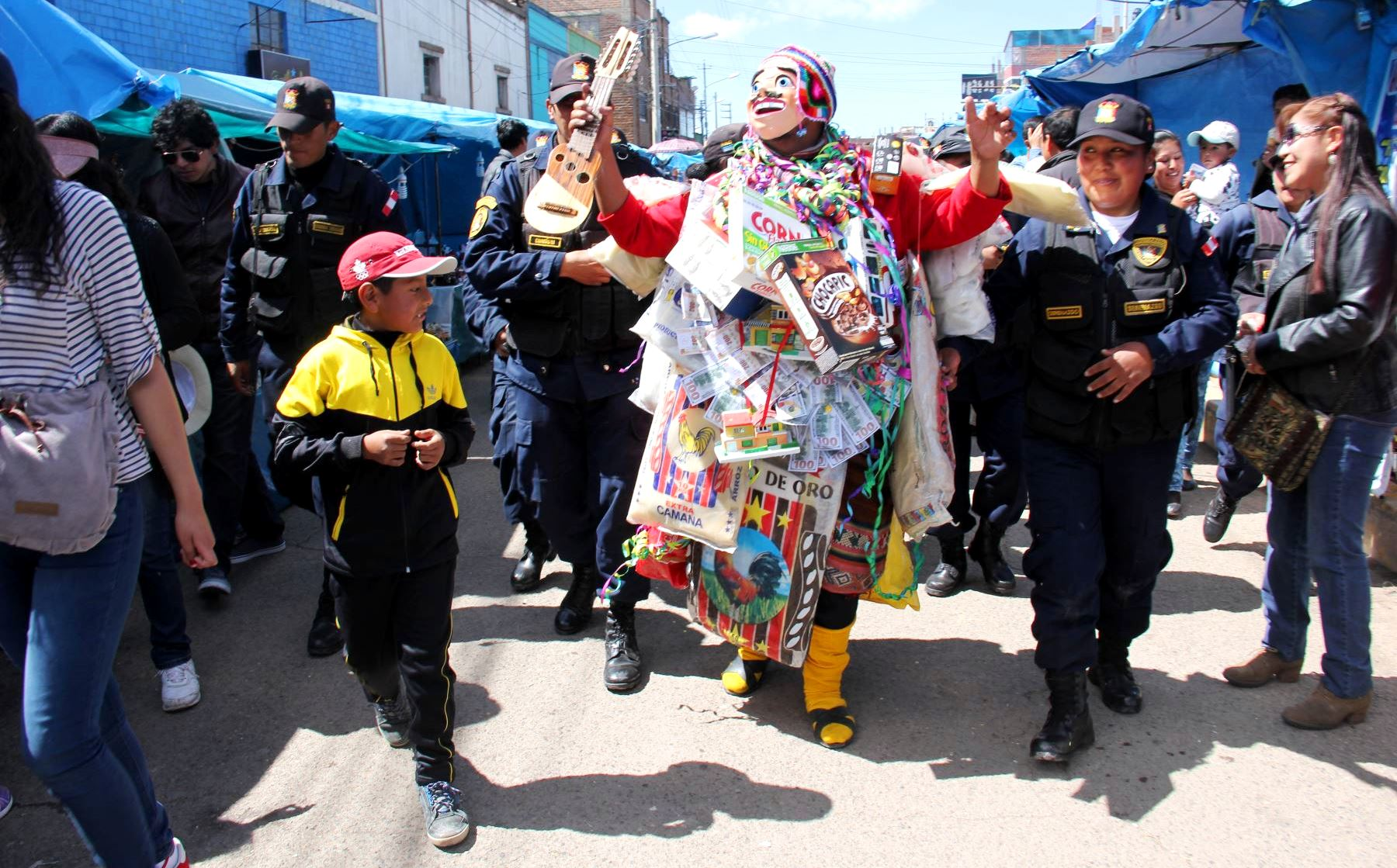
Representation of the Ekeko, in Puno, Perú

The Ekeko is depicted as a man with a mustache wearing traditional Andean clothes (especially the poncho) and completely loaded with bags and baskets with grain and food, (compare with the cornucopia of some Greco-Roman deities), household objects, and currency bills, and basically anything that a person is thought to want or need to have a comfortable and prosperous life; he is commonly found as a little statue to be put in some place of the house, preferably a comfortable one, but also as an amulet attached to key rings; modern statues of the god include a circular opening in his mouth in which to place a cigarette for Ekeko's pleasure. Latest tradition has the Ekeko "smoke" a lit cigarette once a year to ensure a full year of prosperity.

Ekeko should be placed in a place of honor at home. Some versions can be carried in necklaces or key chains.

=== Purpose ===
Ekeko brings monetary wealth to its worshippers. An offering is generally required before he provides his services. Banknotes are often clipped to the Ekeko as offerings, but some statuettes allow for a cigarette to be lit as an offering. The figurines which allow for cigarette offerings have mouth openings large enough for cigarettes to be inserted. Ekeko additionally provides good harvests when offered grain.

== Legend of Ekeko ==
The legend of the Ekeko, as narrated by Antonio Díaz Villamil, dates around 1781 in La Paz, Bolivia. At this time, the city of La Paz was under siege by indigenous people, who were still at war with Spanish forces.

The story of the origin of the Ekeko starts with Paulita Tintaya, an Indian girl who worked for Doña Josefa Ursula de Rojas Foronda, in La Paz.

The girl was in love with Isidoro Choquehuanca. Years before, she had left the hacienda where they both had grown up. Before her departure, Isidoro gave her a small statue to protect her. This small statue was the Ekeko, which was known to the Andean people to be a god of fortune and luck.

At the time of the siege, people were starving to death. Isidoro was enrolled in the indigenous army, and he manage to reach Paulita's house. Every week, he left her food near the statue, which was placed outside the house, but nobody knew he was doing it. Both Paulita and her boss, Doña Josefa, were able to survive the siege because of the food left near the statue by Isidoro. That is the origin of the beliefs of Ekeko's powers in providing abundance.

== Central role in the Alasitas festival ==
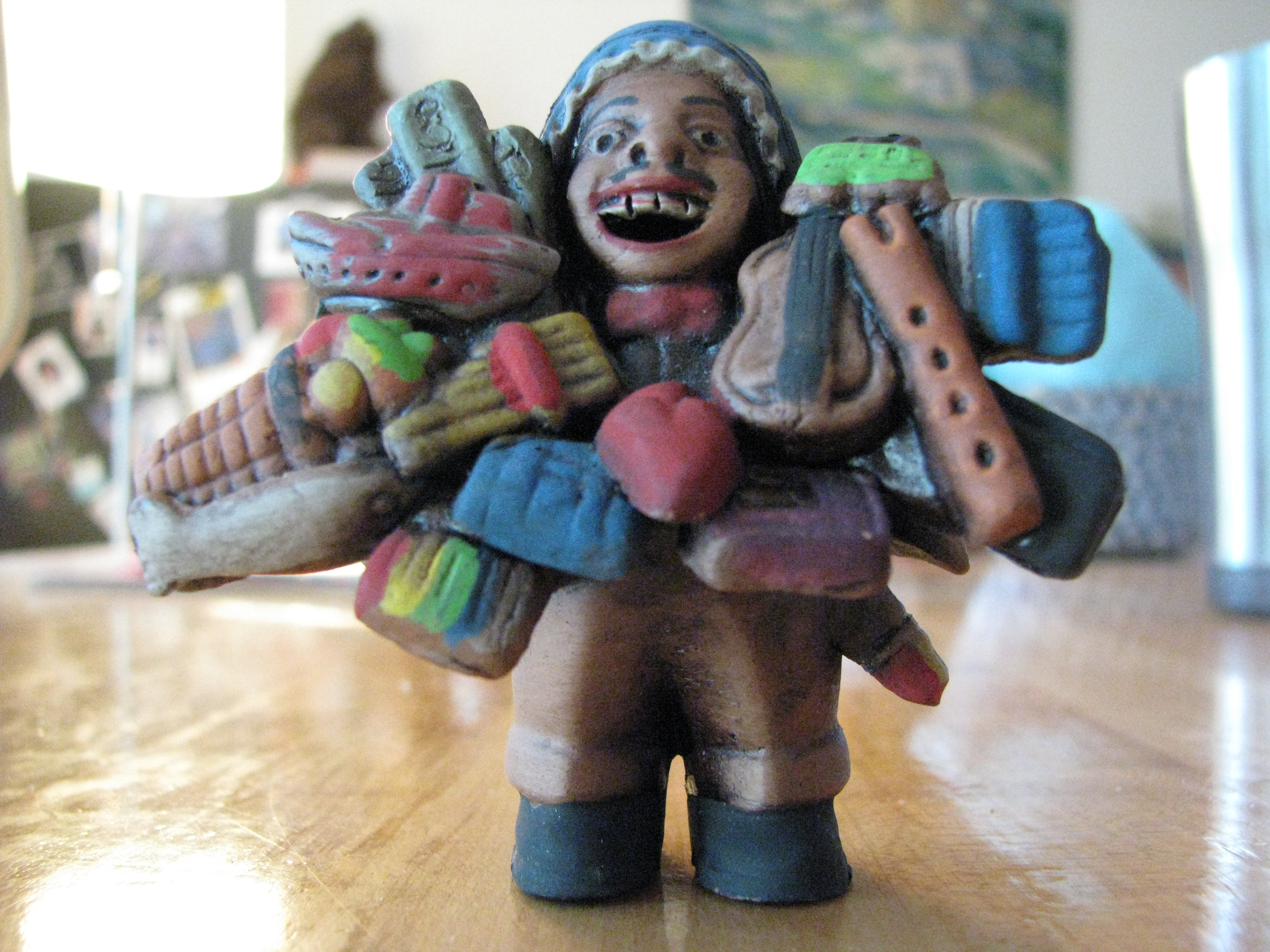
Another artist impression of a Ekeko in Bolivia.

In March 2011 Elizabeth Salguero, Minister of Cultures, nominated Alasitas along with two other Bolivian festivals to UNESCO for World Heritage recognition as part of the cultural and intangible heritage of humanity. People attend the event from all over the city and even travel from other cities inside Bolivia to buy miniature versions of goods to give to others, in the hope that the recipient will receive the real item during the coming year.

Throughout other regions the festival for the Ekeko is held in October and known by the name Calvario.

== See also ==
- Anchanchu
