= Virginia Ayllón Soria =

Bolivian poet, librarian, literary critic and lecturer (born 1958)

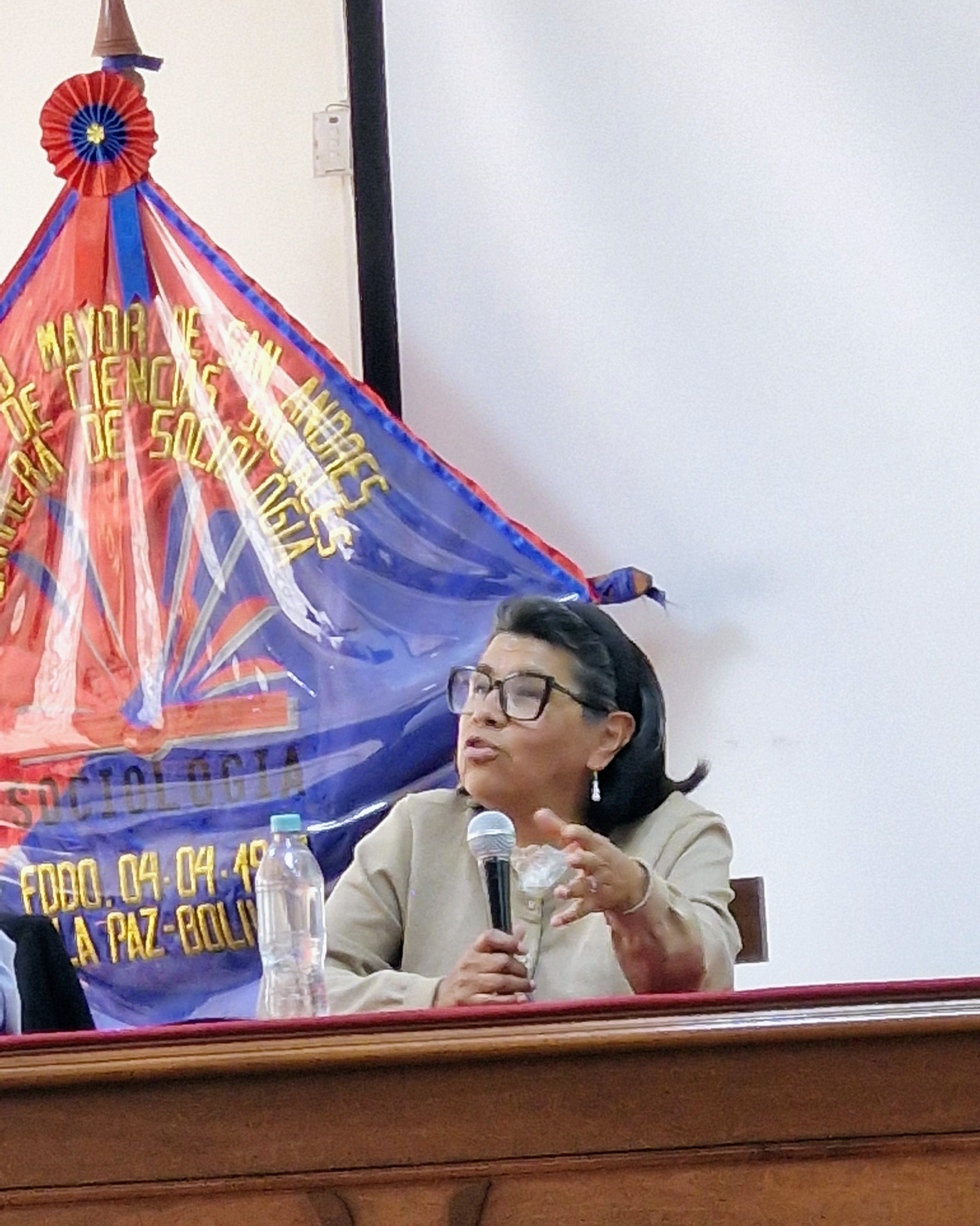
- Born: 1958 (age 67–68); La Paz, Bolivia
- Education: Higher University of San Andrés
- Occupations: Poet; librarian; literary critic; lecturer

Virginia Ayllón Soria (born 1958, La Paz) is a Bolivian poet, librarian, literary critic and lecturer. Ayllón is considered a scholar on the work of the poet Adela Zamudio.

== Biography ==
Ayllón attended the Higher University of San Andrés, where she studied sociology and literature. Ayllón began publishing her work in the 1990s.

From 2003 to 2005, Ayllón served as the head of the Centre for Latin American Research and Documentation (Spanish: Centro de Documentación en Artes y Literaturas Latinoamericanas) in La Paz. A member of the Women's Literature Workshop (Spanish: Taller de Literatura Femenina), Ayllón is an editor for Correveydile, a short story magazine.

=== Literary criticism ===
As a literary critic, Ayllón's work is focused on the study and rediscovery of the work of Bolivian female writers. Primarily focused on the work of Adela Zamudio, as well as Lindaura Anzoátegui Campero, Hilda Mundy, María Virginia Estenssoro and Yolanda Bedregal, Ayllón has published the works La ausencia de Adela Zamudio ( 2012), Cuentos (2013) and El pensamiento de Adela Zamudio (2019).

Ayllón has previously taught at the Higher University of San Andrés.

== Publications ==
=== Books ===
- Ayllón, Virginia; Brinati, Rossana (2001). Guía para la organización de centros de documentación. Serie Formación. La Paz: Fundación PIEB - Programa de Investigación Estratégica de Bolivia. ISBN 978-99905-817-7-5.
- Ayllón, Virginia. Busquedas.
- Ayllón, Virginia (2012). La ausencia de Adela Zamudio (in Spanish).
- Ayllón, Virginia (2013). Cuentos (in Spanish).
- Ayllón, Virginia (2019). El pensamiento de Adela Zamudio (in Spanish).

=== Chapters ===
- Ayllón Soria, Virginia (1998). "Virginia Ayllón Soria". In Benner, Susan Elizabeth; Leonard, Kathy S. (eds.). Fire from the Andes: Short Fiction by Women from Bolivia, Ecuador, and Peru. UNM Press. ISBN 978-0-8263-1825-1.
- Ayllón, Virginia (30 December 2024). "LA TRADICIÓN DE LA LITERATURA FANTÁSTICA EN BOLIVIA (1940-2021)". In Roas, David (ed.). Historia de lo fantástico en las narrativas latinoamericanas (in Spanish). Vervuert Verlagsgesellschaft. pp. 101–126. doi:10.31819/9783968694771-004. ISBN 978-3-96869-477-1.

=== Articles ===
- "La ciudad del signo escrito". Revista Ciencia y Cultura (in Spanish). 4 (7): 155–160. 1 July 2000. ISSN 2077-3323. Archived from the original on 21 March 2025.
- "Estado y mujeres en la obra de cuatro narradoras bolivianas". RECIAL: Revista del Centro de Investigaciones de la Facultad de Filosofía y Humanidades, Áreas Letras. 7 (9): 1. 2016. ISSN 1853-4112.
- "FIN DE SIGLO XIX EN BOLIVIA: APROXIMACIÓN COMPARATIVA DE LAS NARRATIVAS DE LINDAURA ANZÓTEGUI DE CAMPERO Y ADELA ZAMUDIO" (PDF). Revista Historia de las Mujeres. 20 (183). Lima. January 2019. ISSN 2522-3690.
- Ayllón, Virginia (November 2022). "Nueva poesía aymara en Bolivia: Mauro Alwa y Clemente Mamani". Temas Sociales (in Spanish) (51): 61–93. doi:10.53287/zvcs4447hn82f. ISSN 0040-2915.
- "Hilda Mundy, periodista de guerra". Revista Ciencia y Cultura (in Spanish). 28 (53): 47–68. 11 December 2024. doi:10.35319/rcyc.2024531322. ISSN 2077-3323.
