= Ministry of Cultures (Bolivia) =

Government ministry of Bolivia

Ministry of Cultures, Decolonization, and Depatriarchalization
- Ministerio de Culturas, Descolonización, y Despatriarcalización

Ministry overview
- Formed: 7 February 2009; 16 years ago 13 November 2020; 4 years ago (re-established)
- Preceding Ministry: Vice Ministry of Cultural Development
- Type: Ministry
- Jurisdiction: Government of Bolivia
- Headquarters: Casa Grande del Pueblo; Central Zone, Ayacucho Palacio Chico - esq. Potosí, La Paz, Bolivia; 16.49636349131373°S 68.13359136931354°W
- Minister responsible: Sabina Orellana
- Child agencies: Vice Ministry Decolonization and Depatriarchalization; Vice Ministry of Interculturality
- Website: www.minculturas.gob.bo

The Ministry of Cultures, Decolonization, and Depatriarchalization (Spanish: Ministerio de Culturas, Descolonización, y Despatriarcalización) is the ministry of the government of Bolivia that provides for the preservation and protection of the cultures and artistic expressions of the indigenous peoples of Bolivia as well as promotes the country's tourism sector and process of decolonization and depatriarchalization.

== History ==
The history of the Ministry of Cultures began with the establishment of the Bolivian Institute of Culture (IBC) by President Hugo Banzer on 14 March 1975. The IBC —later renamed as the Secretariat of Culture— was a dependent entity of the Ministry of Education and Cultures, granted jurisdiction over the National Archives of Sucre, the Casa de la Libertad, and the Casa de la Moneda in Potosí. During Banzer's second presidency from 1997 to 2001, the secretariat was further elevated to the status of a vice ministry.

In 2006, during the early government of President Evo Morales —Bolivia's first indigenous president— the office was expanded as the Vice Ministry of Cultural Development. On 7 February 2009, through Chapter XX of Supreme Decree N° 29894 on the Organizational Structure of the Executive Body of the Plurinational State, Morales formed the Ministry of Cultures. The until-then vice minister Pablo Groux was appointed to head the ministry. With the enactment of the General Law of Tourism "Bolivia Awaits You", the cultures portfolio was expanded, and it was named the Ministry of Cultures and Tourism for the duration of Morales' term.

The transitional government of Jeanine Áñez eliminated the portfolio on 4 June 2020 to preserve funds to combat the COVID-19 pandemic, a decision criticized by both the opposition and members of Morales' Movement for Socialism (MAS-IPSP). After the return to power of the MAS in that year's general elections, President Luis Arce restored the office as the Ministry of Cultures, Decolonization, and Depatriarchalization on 13 November 2020.

Following the election of Rodrigo Paz Pereira as President in the 2025 Bolivian general election, the Ministry was replaced by the Ministry of Culture and Tourism.

== List of ministers ==
Portfolio	Minister	Party	Prof.	Took office	Left office	Term	President	Ref.
Minister of Cultures	Office vacant 7 February 2009 – 8 February 2009					1	Morales	
Minister of Cultures	Pablo Groux	Ind.	Jrnl.	8 February 2009	23 January 2010	349	Morales	
Minister of Cultures	Zulma Yugar	MAS	Mus.	23 January 2010	15 February 2011	388	Morales	
Minister of Cultures	Elizabeth Salguero	MAS	Jrnl.	15 February 2011	23 January 2012	342	Morales	
Minister of Cultures	Pablo Groux	Ind.	Jrnl.	23 January 2012	25 September 2012	1,123	Morales	
Minister of Cultures and Tourism	Pablo Groux	Ind.	Jrnl.	25 September 2012	19 February 2015	1,123	Morales	
Minister of Cultures and Tourism	Marko Machicao	MAS	Eco.	19 February 2015	23 January 2017	704	Morales	
Minister of Cultures and Tourism	Wilma Alanoca	MAS	Jrnl.	23 January 2017	10 November 2019	1,021	Morales	
Minister of Cultures and Tourism	Office vacant 10 November 2019 – 14 November 2019					4	Áñez	
Minister of Cultures and Tourism	Martha Yujra	MDS	Uni.	14 November 2019	4 June 2020	203	Áñez	
Office abolished 4 June 2020 – 13 November 2020						162	Áñez	
Office abolished 4 June 2020 – 13 November 2020						162	Arce	
Minister of Cultures, Decolonization, and Depatriarchalization	Office vacant 13 November 2020 – 20 November 2020					7	Arce	
Minister of Cultures, Decolonization, and Depatriarchalization	Sabina Orellana	MAS	Uni.	13 November 2020	Incumbent	1,822	Arce	
