= Wilma Alanoca =

Bolivian Minister of Cultures (2017–2019)

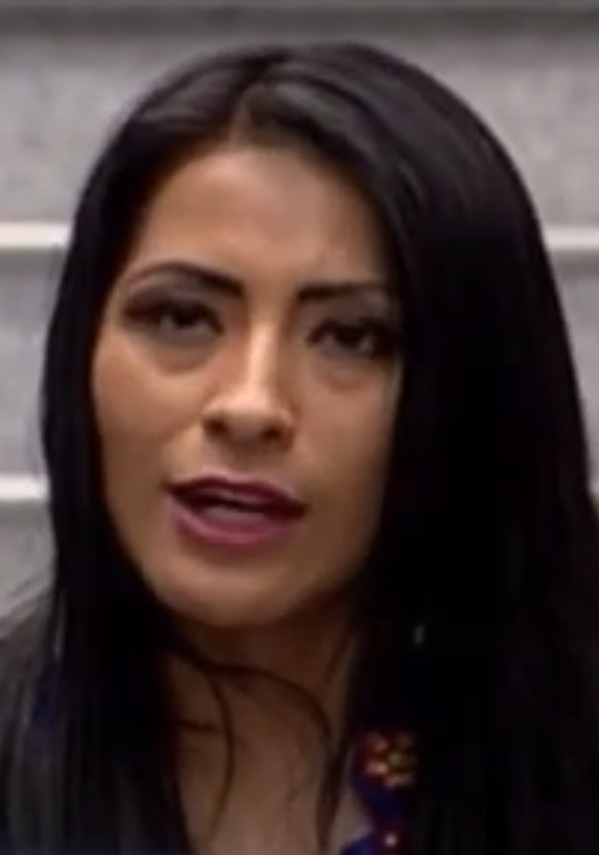

Minister of Cultures and Tourism
- In office 23 January 2017 – 10 November 2019
- President: Evo Morales
- Preceded by: Marko Marcelo Machicao
- Succeeded by: Martha Yujra

El Alto Municipal Councilor
- Incumbent
- Assumed office 3 May 2021
- In office 31 May 2015 – 20 January 2017

Personal details
- Born: Wilma Alanoca Mamani; 5 July 1978 (age 48) La Paz, Bolivia
- Party: Movement for Socialism
- Parent(s): Rosendo Alanoca; Margarita Mamani
- Education: Higher University of San Andrés
- Occupation: Journalist; politician; television presenter

Antonia Wilma Alanoca Mamani (born 5 July 1978) is a Bolivian journalist, politician, and television presenter who served as minister of cultures and tourism from 2017 to 2019. A member of the Movement for Socialism, she previously served an El Alto municipal councilor from 2015 to 2017, a position she returned to in 2021.

== Biography ==
=== Early years ===
Wilma Alanoca was born on 5 July 1978 in La Paz, the youngest of four children of neighborhood leader Rosendo Alanoca and merchant Margarita Mamani.

She began her primary studies in La Paz in 1984. In 1990, when she was 12 years old, the Alanoca family moved to the city of El Alto. She continued her studies there, leaving high school in 1996.

She studied social communication at the Higher University of San Andrés (UMSA), graduating as a journalist in 2009.

=== Professional career ===
Alanoca began her career in media in 2004, while still a university student, appearing on the Continental Radio program Compartiendo la tarde (Sharing the Afternoon). She then worked for a time at Radio Fides, on the program Radio en Vivo con el periodista Andrés Rojas before reading news on the Unitepc channel, and later on Paceñísima de Televisión (Canal 33). She was also on the state channel Bolivia TV with a small business program called Pymes y Mypes. Alanoca worked as a radio broadcaster on Radio Integración in El Alto, with her program Dos horas con Wilma (Two Hours with Wilma), as well as on El Alto's regional Canal 24 with the program Wilma y Usted (Wilma and You). She also became the communications director of the COTEL company, although only for a short time.

=== Red ATB (2011–2014) ===
In 2011, Alanoca joined Red ATB, where she initially covered the news from El Alto, and then as a news anchor. She worked at the television channel until 2014.

== Political career ==
=== Councilor of El Alto (2015–2017) ===
In 2015, Alanoca declared herself a candidate of the MAS-IPSP led by Evo Morales. In March 2015, she was elected councilor in the opposition in the city of El Alto. She was a member of the council from 2015 to 2017.

=== Minister of Cultures of Bolivia (2017–2019) ===
On 23 January 2017, President Evo Morales appointed Alanoca Minister of Cultures of Bolivia. Along with Mariana Prado (born 1982) and Ariana Campero (born 1986), she was one of the three youngest ministers of the third government of President Morales, who made an effort to renew his cabinet with the inclusion of new generations.

=== Return to politics ===
On 29 December 2020, it was announced that Alanoca would seek to be elected to her former position of Councilor of El Alto as the MAS candidate for the 2021 Bolivian regional elections. However, her candidacy was challenged the day after by incumbent councilor Javier Tarqui on the grounds that she did not meet the residence requirements to run. This is due to the fact that in order to run, candidates must have resided permanently for at least the two years immediately prior to the election in the corresponding jurisdiction. Tarqui posited that since Alanoca had been living in asylum for almost a year in the Mexican Embassy in La Paz which “for international standards […] is constituted in Mexican territory, under Mexican sovereignty” she therefore had not been living in Bolivian territory for the mandated two years. Alanoca's candidacy was also challenged by members of MAS itself who did not want to run a former minister when, while she was in asylum, there were other people who had resisted the transitional government in El Alto.

== Controversies ==
On 1 March 2018, during the delivery of household gas in El Alto on the occasion of her anniversary, Minister Alanoca was verbally assaulted by President Morales. He was harshly criticized by the population for degrading women with the following phrase:

The people of El Alto are growing and growing, not only because they are cututus [rabbits]. I don't want to bother you; you have to ask Sister Minister [Wilma Alanoca] to contribute to populating El Alto – there is a deputy close by, I think.

Political offices
Preceded by Marko Marcelo Machicao	Minister of Cultures and Tourism; 2017–2019	Succeeded by Martha Yujra
