= Paola Senseve Tejada =

Bolivian writer, poet and activist

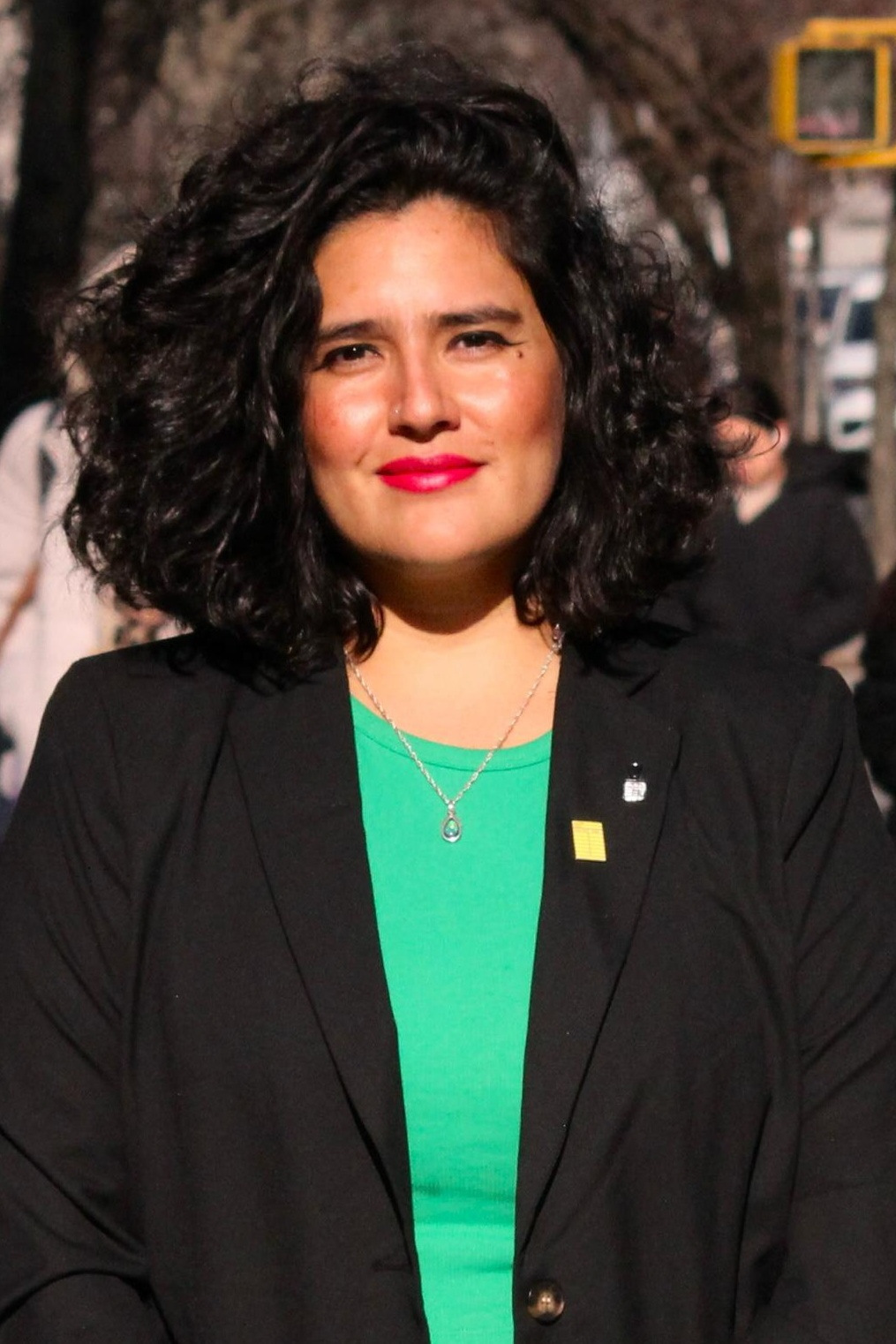
- In New York in 2024
- Born: Paola Rocío Senseve Tejada; 29 March 1987 (age 39); Cochabamba, Bolivia
- Education: Private University of Santa Cruz de la Sierra
- Occupations: Writer, poet
- Awards: Yolanda Bedregal National Poetry Award (2019)

Paola Rocío Senseve Tejada (born 29 March 1987) is a Bolivian writer, poet, and feminist activist.

She is the recipient of the 2019 Yolanda Bedregal National Poetry Award, the 2nd National Award for New Writers, and the Santa Cruz National Literature Award.

== Biography ==
Paola Senseve Tejada was born in Cochabamba on 29 March 1987. She studied psychology at the Private University of Santa Cruz de la Sierra. As of 2019, she resides in Santa Cruz de la Sierra.

Senseve recounts that her passion for literature began in adolescence. In 2005, at the age of 17, she won the newspaper El Deber's short story contest, and a year later she achieved third place in the literature contest at the Expociencia at the Gabriel René Moreno Autonomous University, in the short story category.

In 2008, during the presentation of the National Award for New Writers, in which Senseve took first place with her work Vaginario, researcher Carlos Hugo Molina, along with jury member Ronald Méndez, highlighted her literary quality, considering her an important contributor to Bolivian literature.

== Feminist activism ==
In her writings, Senseve emphasizes the role of women both in her immediate family and in her wider social environment.

During the ceremony for the 2019 Yolanda Bedregal National Poetry Award, which Senseve received for her poetry collection Codex Corpus, she made a series of remarks highlighting the gaps, violence, and invisibility that women in literature have faced throughout history – and still face – in the world and in the region. These included:

I'm not saying anything new or unrelated today. The world of literature is very similar to that of politics or science.

It is very important that feminism occupies all possible spaces to correct huge historical errors, such as the systematic invisibility of female authors, but also to conceive new and broad forms of thought and production outside of the patriarchal rigidity that has positioned an inevitable mediocrity (by exclusion) in every aspect of our lives.

I believe there are more and better opportunities due to the political efforts of women who choose to read and publish other women as a stance; but there is still much disregard, academic and literary debate and discussion panels that only include men, a greater number of publications by male authors than by female authors, higher sales of books written by men, and more, more revealing data.

Reading female writers today remains a political and subversive act.

It should also be said that sexism in literature, as in everything else, always goes hand in hand with classism and racism, like titanic structural blocks that are difficult to eradicate from societies.

== Awards and recognition ==
- 2nd National Award for New Writers from the Book Chamber and Petrobras, 2008
- Santa Cruz National Literature Award, 2011
- Yolanda Bedregal National Poetry Award for Codex Corpus, 2019

== Works ==
- Vaginario (2008)
- Soy Dios (2011)
- Ego (2014)
- Codex Corpus (2019)
