= Bolpress =

Bolivian press agency and news website

Bolpress is a press agency and news website based in Bolivia. Established in 2002, as of 2013 it is one of the most popular news sites in the country.
