= Elías Blanco Mamani =

Bolivian biographer

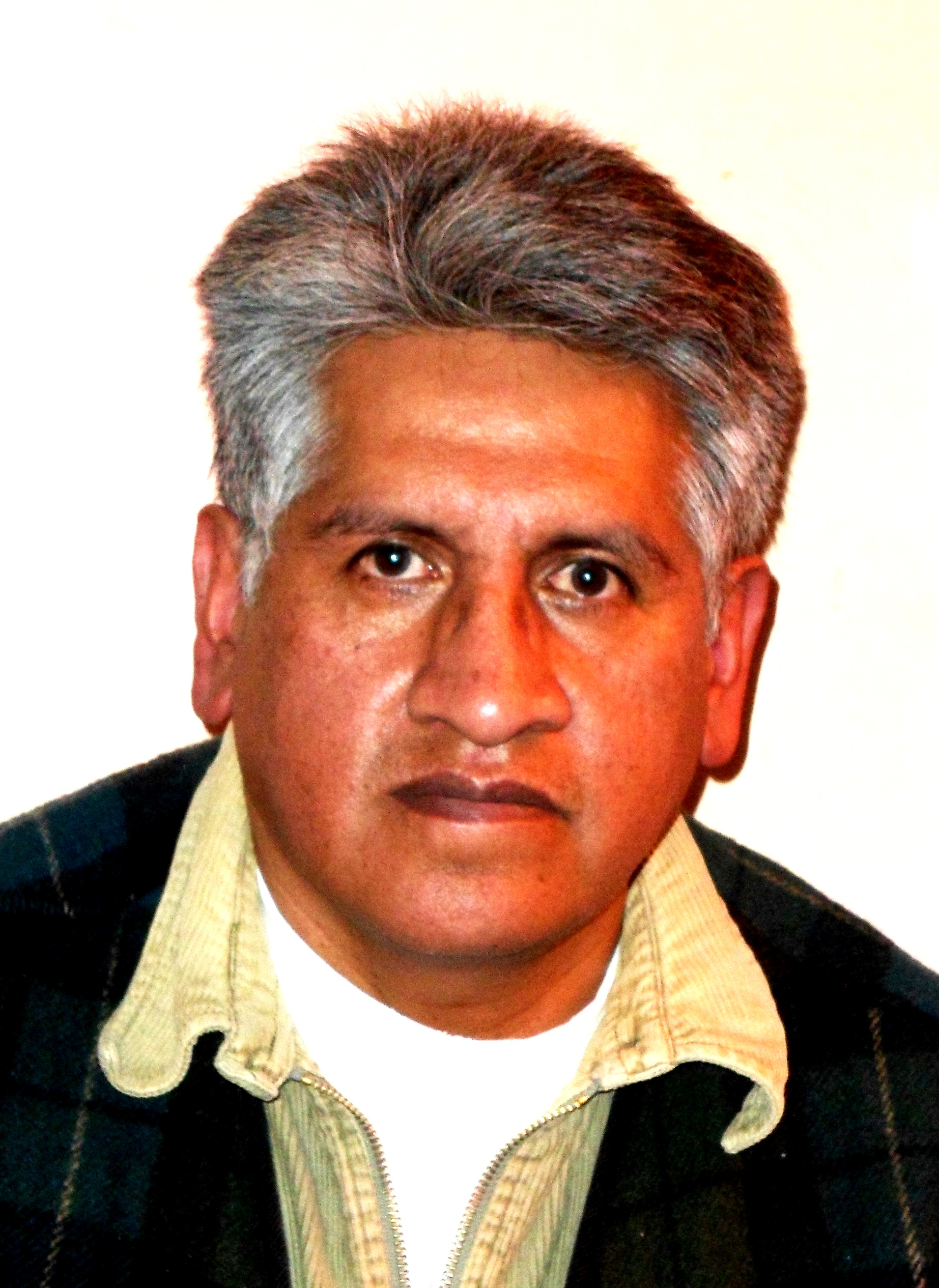
- Born: 20 July 1962 (age 63) La Paz, Bolivia
- Occupation: Biographer; journalist; writer
- Language: Spanish
- Education: Higher University of San Andrés
- Genre: Biography
- Notable works: Bolivian Cultural Dictionary

Website
- elias-blanco.blogspot.com

Elías Blanco Mamani (born 20 July 1962) is a Bolivian journalist, writer, and prolific biographer whose works include the Bolivian Cultural Dictionary which has compiled information on the lives of over 2,000 poets, novelists, writers, and other protagonists of Bolivian cultural history. He is the founder and operator of the editorial and museum El Aparapita in La Paz.

== Biographical career ==
In 1992, he retired from his profession as a journalist in order to dedicate himself fully to the task of meticulously researching, writing, and compiling the biographies of thousands of Bolivian historical authors. Between 2006 and 2011, he published a series on various individuals in Bolivian culture from each of the country's departments as well as Argentina, Chile, and Germany.

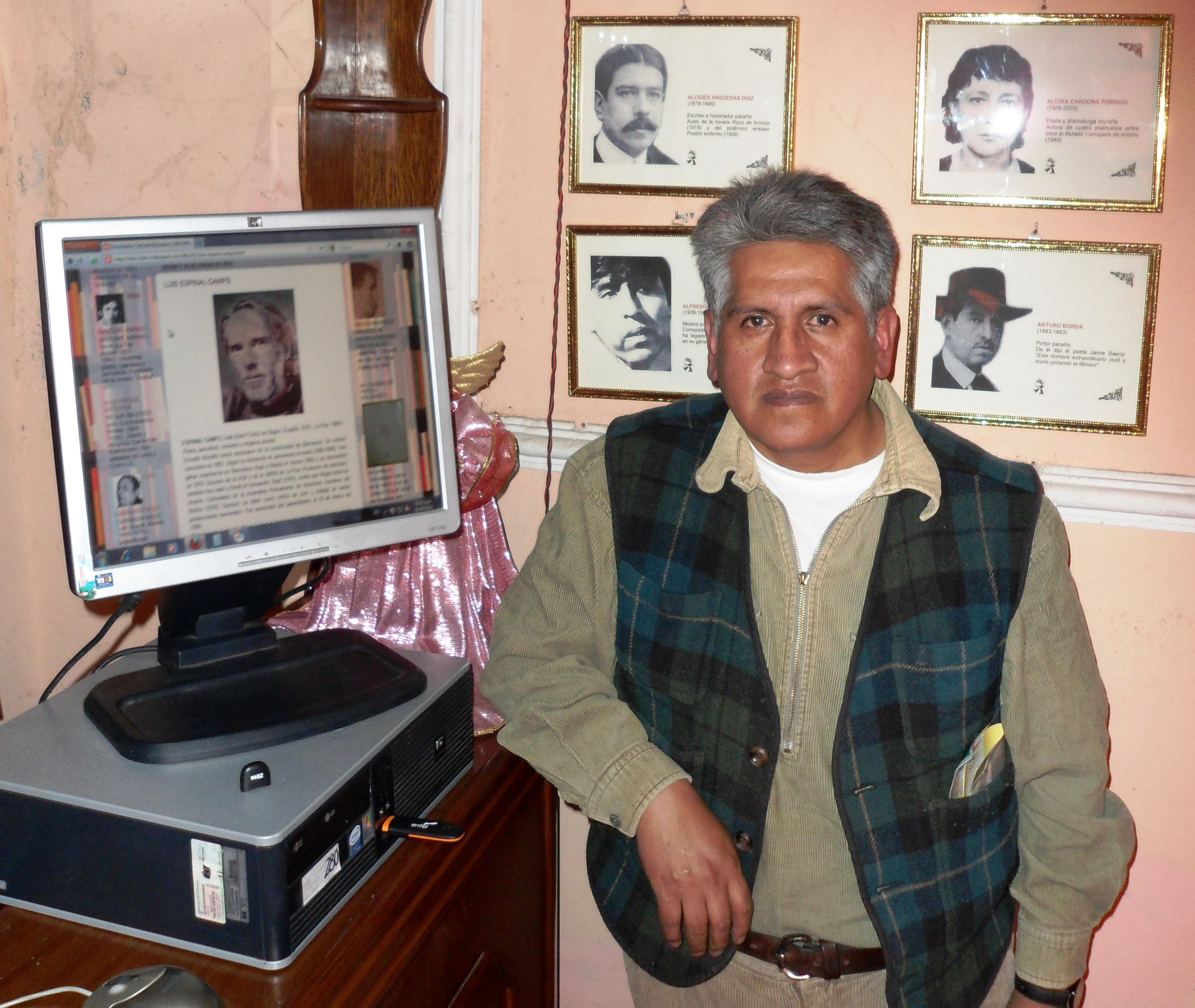
Blanco at the Aparapita Museum

After 20 years of work, he published his first book Diccionario de Poetas Bolivianos in 2011, which incorporate biographical data as well as select poems, criticisms, and author's thoughts on over 1000 Bolivian poets. The following year, he published the Diccionario de Novelistas Bolivianos, the second volume of the series, which catalogued 491 authors and 918 novels published from 1834 to 2012.

In order to publish his works, Blanco established the El Aparapita publishing house. An aparapita is an Aymara word which, as translated by Jaime Sáenz, means "the one who carries". Blanco explained that he named the editorial after the term because "In this case, it carries something very heavy: the wealth of information on Bolivian culture". In addition to being an editorial, El Aparapita doubles as a museum and gallery of "forgers of Bolivian culture".

As a complementary feature to this publications, Blanco operates the Diccionario Cultural Boliviano, a blog that compiles these biographies into a digital format. The blog was launched in April 2012 on the same day as the opening of the Aparapita museum. Blanco's stated aim in creating the dictionary was ease of access, especially in regards to research from abroad.

== Publications ==
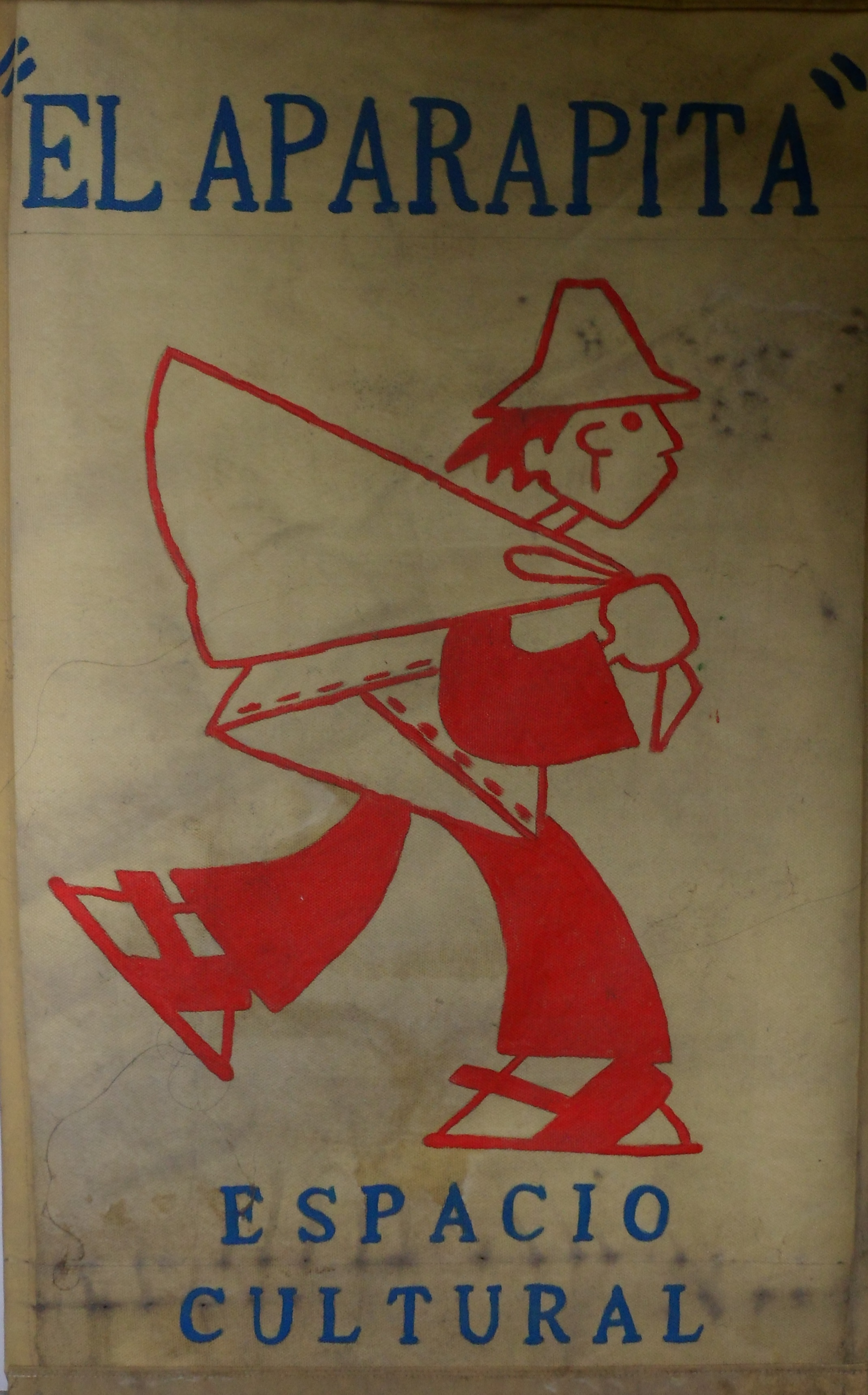
El Aparapita Editorial

- Blanco Mamani, Elías (1998). Jaime Saenz, el ángel solitario y jubiloso de la noche (in Spanish). La Paz: Casa de la Cultura "Franz Tamayo".
- —————————— (2005). Enciclopedia Gesta de autores de la literatura boliviana (in Spanish). Vol. 1. Agencia Gesta de Servicio Informativo Cultural. ISBN 9789990563627.
- —————————— (2006). Orureños en la cultura Boliviana (in Spanish). La Paz: Viceministerio de Desarrollo de Culturas.
- —————————— (2009). 200 Poetas Paceños (in Spanish). La Paz: Editorial El Aparapita.
- —————————— (2010). Alemanes en la cultura Boliviana (in Spanish). La Paz: Editorial El Aparapita.
- —————————— (2010). Argentinos en la cultura Boliviana (in Spanish). La Paz: Editorial El Aparapita.
- —————————— (2010). Chilenos en la cultura Boliviana (in Spanish). La Paz: Editorial El Aparapita.
- —————————— (2010). Potosinos en la cultura Boliviana (in Spanish). La Paz: Editorial El Aparapita.
- —————————— (2010). Tarijeños en la cultura Boliviana (in Spanish). La Paz: Editorial El Aparapita.
- —————————— (2011). Diccionaro de Poetas Bolivianos (in Spanish). La Paz: Editorial El Aparapita.
- —————————— (2012). Enciclopedia Gesta de autores de la literatura boliviana (in Spanish). Vol. 2. Agencia Gesta de Servicio Informativo Cultural.
- —————————— (2012). Diccionario de Novelistas Bolivianos (in Spanish). La Paz: Editorial El Aparapita.
