= Yolanda Bedregal =

Bolivian poet and novelist

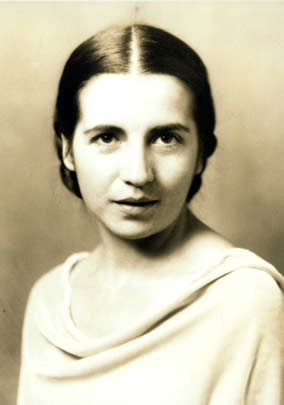
Yolanda Bedregal

Yolanda Bedregal de Cónitzer (21 September 1916 – 21 May 1999) was a Bolivian poet and novelist, known as Yolanda of Bolivia (Yolanda de Bolivia). She is known for her explorations of human emotions, and especially in her later years, isolation and loneliness.

== Life ==
Bedregal was born in La Paz, Bolivia, into a wealthy and academic family. Her father, Juan Francisco Bedregal, was Rector of the Universidad Mayor de San Andrés, a professor and an influential writer. Her mother was Carmen Iturri Alborta. Bedregal received her bachillerato (high school diploma) from the prestigious Instituto Americano de La Paz. She studied at the Escuela Superior de Bellas Artes of La Paz, and then went, on a scholarship, to Columbia University in New York City where she studied aesthetics.

Upon her return to La Paz, she taught at various institutions, including the Conservatorio de Música, la Escuela Superior de Bellas Artes, the Universidad Mayor de San Andrés, and then at the Academia Benavides de Sucre.

She was the founder and first president of the Bolivian National Union of Poets (Unión Nacional de Poetas). She also represented Bolivia in several international congresses and was designated as the Bolivian Ambassador to Spain.

Bedregal published approximately 20 books, which included poetry, narrative and anthologies. Some of her poems were written in collaboration with her husband, Gert Conitzer, who translated Bedregal's verses into German. She also wrote children's books and published several magazine and newspaper articles on literature, art, pedagogy, religion, myths, folklore, and Aymara and Quechua craftsmanship.

Bedregal died in La Paz on 21 May 1999.

== Works ==
Her first book of poetry was Naufragio published in 1936, where her explicit and precise language explored the human condition.

== Recording from the Library of Congress ==
Yolanda Bedregral reads from her own works: Naufragio Poemar, Nadir, Antología mínima, and Bajo el oscuro sol (1979).

== Honors and legacy ==
In 1971, she received the Bolivian National Book award for her novel Bajo el oscuro sol published that year.

The Yolanda Bedregal National Poetry Award, given by government of Bolivia, was instituted in the year 2000 and named in her honor.

Bolivia issued a postage stamp in her honor in 1993.
