= La Chojlla =

Coordinates: 16.4067°S 67.7758°W

- Town
- Interactive map of La Chojlla
- Country: Bolivia
- Time zone: UTC-4 (BOT)

La Chojlla is a small town in Bolivia.
