= Zulma Yugar =

Bolivian politician and singer

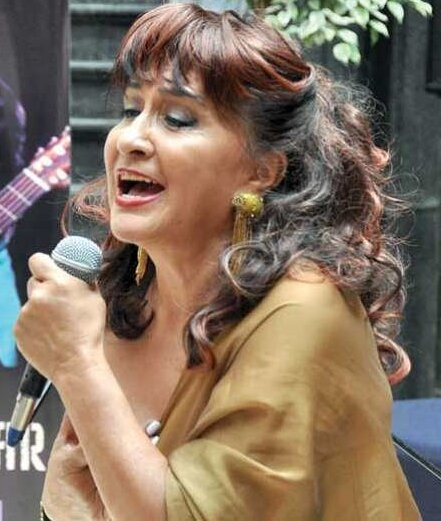
- Born: January 6, 1952 (age 74); Oruro, Bolivia
- Occupations: Politician, folk singer
- Known for: Minister of Culture of Bolivia, UNESCO Artist for Peace

Zulma Yugar (born January 6, 1952, in Oruro, Bolivia) is a Bolivian politician and folk singer with international recognition and influence. She has served as Minister of Culture of Bolivian President Evo Morales' second term.

Yugar served on the jury for the UNESCO program Masterpieces of the Oral and Intangible Heritage of Humanity and is credited by her friend Mr. R. Albro with lobbying successfully for the Oruro Carnival to be proclaimed a masterpiece in 2001.

Yugar has been Director for the Promotion of Culture within the Ministry of Culture, President of the Bolivian Association of Artists and Musicians, and President of the Bolivian National Council of Popular and Traditional Culture. She has received numerous awards and is a UNESCO Artist for Peace.

== Discography ==
- Embrujo Lyra 1969
- Joya Del Folklore 1974
- Piel Morena 1981
- Kutimuy 1982
- Zulma Yugar 1982
- Zulma 1984
- Zulma Yugar 1986
- Abriendo Brecha 1988
- Imillita 1988
- Compartiendo Talentos 1990
- K´oli Pankarita - Dulce Florcita 1991
- Zulma Yugar / Gerardo Arias* - Nosotros 1995
- Zulma* Y Gerardo* - Primero Lo Nuestro 2001
- Zulma Yugar Interpreta A Rafael Arias* 2012
