= Fernando Cajías =

Bolivian historian and politician (born 1949)

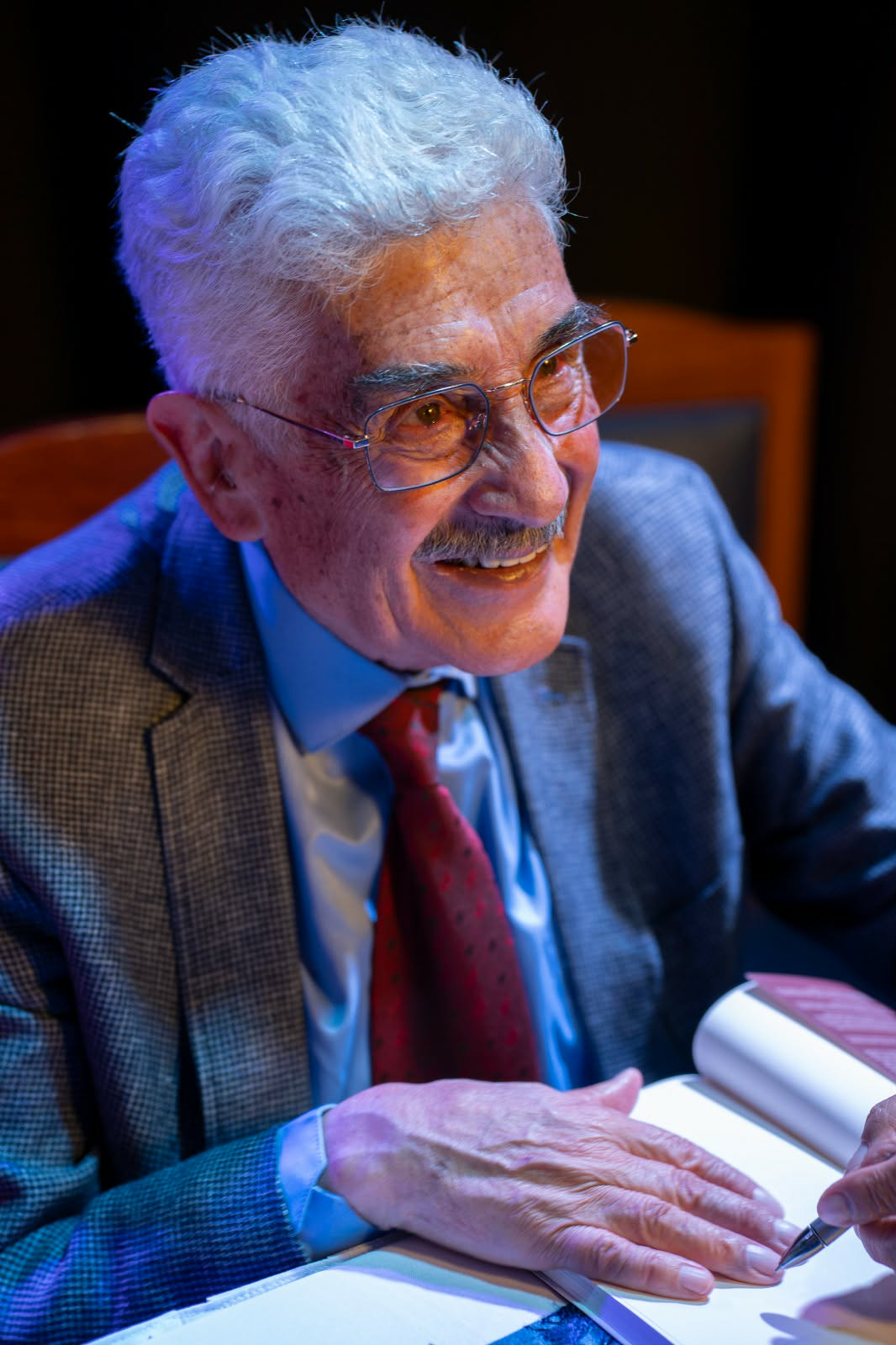
- Cajías in 2026

Vice Minister of Cultures
- In office 5 July 2004 – 9 June 2005
- President: Carlos Mesa
- Minister: Gustavo Pedraza; Erwin Aguilera
- Preceded by: Isabel Álvarez Plata
- Succeeded by: Oswaldo Rivera

Prefect of La Paz
- In office 18 August 1989 – 10 January 1992
- Appointed by: Jaime Paz Zamora
- Preceded by: Ángel Gómez
- Succeeded by: Adolfo Soliz

Member of the Chamber of Deputies from La Paz
- In office 3 August 1985 – 2 August 1989
- Preceded by: José Tirado
- Succeeded by: Carlos Pérez
- Constituency: Party list

Personal details
- Born: Fernando Julio Cajías de la Vega; 28 February 1949 (age 77) La Paz, Bolivia
- Party: Revolutionary Left Movement
- Other political affiliations: 9 April Revolutionary Vanguard
- Spouses: Naya Ponce; María de los Ángeles Urioste
- Children: 4, including Wara
- Parents: Huáscar Cajías; Beatriz de la Vega
- Relatives: Cajías family
- Education: Higher University of San Andrés; University of Seville
- Occupation: Historian; lawyer; politician
- Website: Official website

Fernando Julio Cajías de la Vega (born 28 February 1949) is a Bolivian academic, historian, and politician. A member of the academically influential Cajías family, Cajías composed part of the first generation of professional historians that began operating in Bolivia in the second half of the twentieth century. A graduate and tenured professor at the Higher University of San Andrés, he taught art and cultural history and worked as a doctoral advisor, in addition to serving as the university's secretary general from 1978 to 1980 and as its dean of humanities from 1997 to 2003. His archival work led him to serve as director of the National Institute of History and Literature and later executive director of its parent body, the Bolivian Institute of Culture.

Initially sympathetic towards conservative values, Cajías realigned towards left-wing ideology during the country's democratic transition. He joined the Revolutionary Left Movement in 1977, with which he was elected to represent La Paz in the Chamber of Deputies from 1985 to 1989 before being appointed prefect of La Paz from 1989 to 1992. After a brief stint as ambassador to Spain from 1992 to 1993, Cajías returned to Bolivia, where he was elected to the La Paz Municipal Council. Estranged from the Revolutionary Left Movement over his agitation for internal renewal, Cajías sought to be reelected with a different front in 1995 but failed to retain his seat.

Though retired from politics from that point on, Cajías continued to hold minor public posts throughout the 2000s. He served as vice minister of cultures from 2004 to 2005 and headed the research team at the Strategic Directorate of the Maritime Claim during the country's lawsuit against Chile. An unsuccessful candidate for vice rector and rector in 2004 and 2021, respectively, Cajías continues to work as a professor and researcher at the Higher University of San Andrés.

== Early life and career ==
Fernando Cajías was born on 28 February 1949, in the Sopocachi neighborhood of La Paz to Huáscar Cajías and Beatriz de la Vega. Cajías was raised in a highly academic environment; his father, the patriarch of the Cajías clan, was a respected journalist and intellectual, most notable for founding and directing Presencia, one of the leading periodicals of the second half of the twentieth century. Cajías was the eldest of ten siblings: six sisters—Dora, Beatriz, Lupe, Magdalena, Martha Teresa, and Isabel—and three brothers—Francisco, Huáscar, and Pedro—a substantial majority of whom became distinguished authors, historians, journalists, professors, and public officials in their own right.

Between 1955 and 1967, Cajías attended the Marshal Braun German School, where he completed his primary and secondary schooling. After that, he attended the Higher University of San Andrés (UMSA), graduating with degrees in history, law, and political science; his graduate thesis, La Provincia de Atacama, 1825–1842, was published by the Bolivian Institute of Culture in 1975. Together with other figures, Cajías composes part of the first generation of professional historians and archivists in the country, a group primarily consisting of alumni of Professor Alberto Crespo Rodas, a noted historian and twenty-year professor at the UMSA. Shortly after graduating, Cajías traveled to Spain, where he completed his doctorate in History of the Americas at the University of Seville.

Returning to Bolivia, Cajías dedicated himself to archival and educational activities at the UMSA, where he worked as a professor and researcher and served as the university's secretary general from 1978 to 1980. Cajías also collaborated closely with the Bolivian Institute of Culture and its subsidiary bodies, serving as head of research and later director of the National Institute of History and Literature before becoming executive director of the Institute of Culture itself in 1982. In other areas, Cajías chaired the Bolivian Society of History, was a member of the Bolivian Academy of History, and served as a counselor at the Central Bank of Bolivia's Cultural Foundation.

== Political career ==
Originally a conservative, Cajías realigned himself towards the left during the country's transition to democracy. He joined the Revolutionary Left Movement (MIR) in 1977, composing part of history academia's "Mirista-wing," a sizeable clique of partisan professors led by Crespo. Exiled to Panama by the García Meza regime, Cajías returned to the country in 1982 and was elected to represent La Paz in the Chamber of Deputies on the MIR's 1985 party list. He belonged to the second generation of MIR partisans, a group whose political careers began in conjunction with the fall of the military dictatorships and the reintroduction of democratic administration. For those who stood out in their first elective role, the MIR typically promoted them from the lower to upper chamber, a sign of confidence in their electability. Such was the case with Cajías, who ran for a seat in the Senate in 1989, though he failed to attain the position.

Despite the loss, Cajías remained close with party leadership and was appointed prefect of La Paz when Jaime Paz Zamora assumed the presidency. After a short tenure focused on promoting the revitalization of La Paz's cultural traditions, Cajías was reassigned to serve as the country's ambassador to Spain, where he resided for the duration of Paz Zamora's term. Upon his return to Bolivia in 1993, Cajías was nominated to contest the La Paz mayoralty. Though unsuccessful in that effort, the MIR's electoral performance did net him a seat in the municipal council. As the MIR's political image became tarnished by its top officials' links to drug trafficking and other forms of corruption, Cajías led the drive to move the party forward by expunging its "cardinal" figures from party leadership. However, such positions proved contentious among the party's partisans, ultimately leading Cajías to defect from the MIR over its inability to modernize internally. In 1995, he joined the 9 April Revolutionary Vanguard—a minor party primarily composed of defectors from other fronts—with which he sought reelection, though to no avail.

== Academic work ==
Following his 1995 defeat, Cajías retired from political life, returning to his roots in academia. He resumed instruction at the UMSA, where he worked as a doctoral advisor and professor, teaching undergraduate and postgraduate courses in art and cultural history in his capacity as dean of humanities. As a visiting scholar, he also hosted lectures and taught courses at the Bolivian Catholic University and other national and foreign institutes. In 2004, he unsuccessfully accompanied Iván Irazoque as a candidate for vice rector, losing in the second round to Roberto Aguilar and Jorge Ocampo. Over a decade later, in 2021, he sought to be elected rector in his own right but was forced to withdraw after contracting COVID-19.

In 2004, during the administration of Carlos Mesa, Cajías was appointed to serve as vice minister of cultures. His selection represented a key characteristic of Mesa's government: the designation of intellectuals and academics—especially historians—to high executive positions, a product of the president's own academic origins. In his final public post, Cajías was appointed to serve as director of research at the Strategic Directorate of the Maritime Claim, charged with reviewing historical documents between Bolivia and Chile for information that could bolster the country's lawsuit over territorial access to the Pacific Ocean.

== Personal life ==
In his first marriage, Cajías was betrothed to Naya Ponce, minister of popular participation in the administration of Eduardo Rodríguez Veltzé, and daughter of noted archeologist Carlos Ponce Sanginés and anthropologist Julia Elena Fortún. The pair had two children, Wara and José Gabriel, the former of whom worked as a choreographer and stage director at various theaters in Bolivia and Germany. Following his separation from Ponce, Cajías remarried to María de los Ángeles Urioste, with whom he had two more children, Andrés and Ana Catalina.

== Electoral history ==
Electoral history of Fernando Cajías
Year	Office	Party	Votes			Result	Ref.
Year	Office	Party	Total	%	P.	Result	Ref.
1985	Deputy	Revolutionary Left Movement	47,025	7.76%	4th (Note: Presented on an electoral list. The data shown represents the share of the vote the entire party/alliance received in that constituency.)	Won	
1989	Senator	Revolutionary Left Movement	92,143	15.66%	4th	Lost	
1993	Mayor	Revolutionary Left Movement	15,626	4.30%	5th (Note: Figures for this election represent the results obtained in the entire Murillo Province, not just La Paz.)	Partial	
1995	Councillor	9 April Revolutionary Vanguard	3,253	1.08%	8th	Lost	
Source: Plurinational Electoral Organ | Electoral Atlas

== Publications ==
- Cajías de la Vega, Fernando (1975). La Provincia de Atacama, 1825–1842 (in Spanish). La Paz: Instituto Boliviano de Cultura. OCLC 1286242040.
- —————————————; et al. (1995). La Historia de Bolivia y la Historia de la Coca (in Spanish). Rome: Centro Italiano di Solidarietà. OCLC 41944546.
- ————————————— (2004). Oruro 1781: Sublevación de Indios y Rebelión Criolla (in Spanish). La Paz: Instituto Francés de Estudios Andinos; Instituto de Estudios Bolivianos; ASDI-SAREC. OCLC 66381225.
- ————————————— (2009). Historia Colonial de La Paz (in Spanish). La Paz: Santillana. OCLC 838477904.
- ————————————— (2010). La Plaza y Región de Churubamba – San Sebastián (in Spanish). La Paz: Tecnopor. OCLC 760282071.

Chamber of Deputies of Bolivia
Preceded by José Tirado	Member of the Chamber of Deputies from La Paz; 1985–1989	Succeeded by Carlos Pérez
Political offices
Preceded by Ángel Gómez	Prefect of La Paz; 1989–1991	Succeeded by Adolfo Soliz
Government offices
Preceded by Isabel Álvarez Plata	Vice Minister of Cultures; 2004–2005	Succeeded by Oswaldo Rivera
