= White Bolivians =

Bolivianos blancos (Spanish)

Total population
- White ancestry predominates c. 568,267-1,704,800; 5–15% of the Bolivian population.

Regions with significant populations
- Mainly in Santa Cruz, La Paz, Cochabamba and to a lesser extent the rest of the Media Luna Region (Tarija, Beni and Pando).

Languages
- Bolivian Spanish; German (Plautdietsch, Standard German); Bolivian Sign Language

Religion
- Roman Catholicism, Anabaptism, Evangelicalism, Judaism, Irreligion

Related ethnic groups
- Spaniards; Europeans

White Bolivians (Spanish: Bolivianos blancos), are Bolivians of total or predominantly European ancestry (formerly called criollos in the viceregal era), most notably from Spain which prominently are descendants of the Spanish Basques, and to a lesser extent, Germany, Italy and Croatia.

Bolivians of European descent are mostly descendants of people who arrived over several centuries from Spain, approximately five hundred years ago. They are also descendants of Arabs or European immigrants from Spain, Germany, Italy, and Croatia, among others.

White Bolivians represent the third largest ethnic group in the country, behind mestizos and Indigenous peoples, who are in first and second place respectively, representing 5% according to the CIA World Factbook's self-perception survey. The majority of white Bolivians are the descendants of Criollos of Spanish descent as well as the Europeans from Germany, Italy, and Croatia. White Bolivians mainly live in the largest cities and major towns in Bolivia like Santa Cruz and La Paz. An additional 68% of the population is mestizo, having mixed European (predominantly Spaniard) and Indigenous ancestry.

According to the "ethnic composition of the American continent", Castizos and White Bolivians represent 15% of the total population.

== History ==
José María Pérez de Urdininea, 3rd president of Bolivia

Historically, compared to the indigenous population, a significantly smaller number of white and mestizo Bolivians have lived in poverty. Conceptions of racial boundaries in Bolivia have been fluid and perceptions of race have been linked to socioeconomic status, with the possibility that a person could achieve "whitening" through economic advancement. Differences in language, educational attainment, and employment status have also reinforced perceptions of what constituted a person as "white", "mestizo" or "indigenous".

=== Settlement ===
Spanish conquistador Francisco Pizarro was the first European to control Bolivia. The first white people in Bolivia were the Spanish conquistadors, who arrived in the present-day territory in the early 16th century. Spanish Basques were notable colonial settlers in Bolivia and attempted to assert control in the War of the Vicuñas and Basques, they settled mainly in mining regions, such as Cerro Rico de Potosí, a region that became the most populous city in the world during the colonial period. Meanwhile, in eastern Bolivia, indigenous reductions were carried out by Jesuit missions and later by Franciscan missions.

=== European migratory periods ===
Bolivia had a total of 5 European migratory waves, the first during the colonial period, the second during the republican period, the third during the industrial boom, the fourth during the Second World War and the fifth since the 1950s. The most important migratory waves were the third and fourth, especially since 1900 with the war refugees.

== Demographics ==
There has been no attempt to officially count the number of white Bolivians since 1900. In the official census in 1900, people who self-identified as "White" (blanco) composed 12.72% or 231,088 of the total population. This was the last time data on race was collected. There were 529 Italians, 420 Spaniards, 295 Germans, 279 French, 177 Austrians, 141 English and 23 Belgians living in Bolivia.

=== European descendants ===
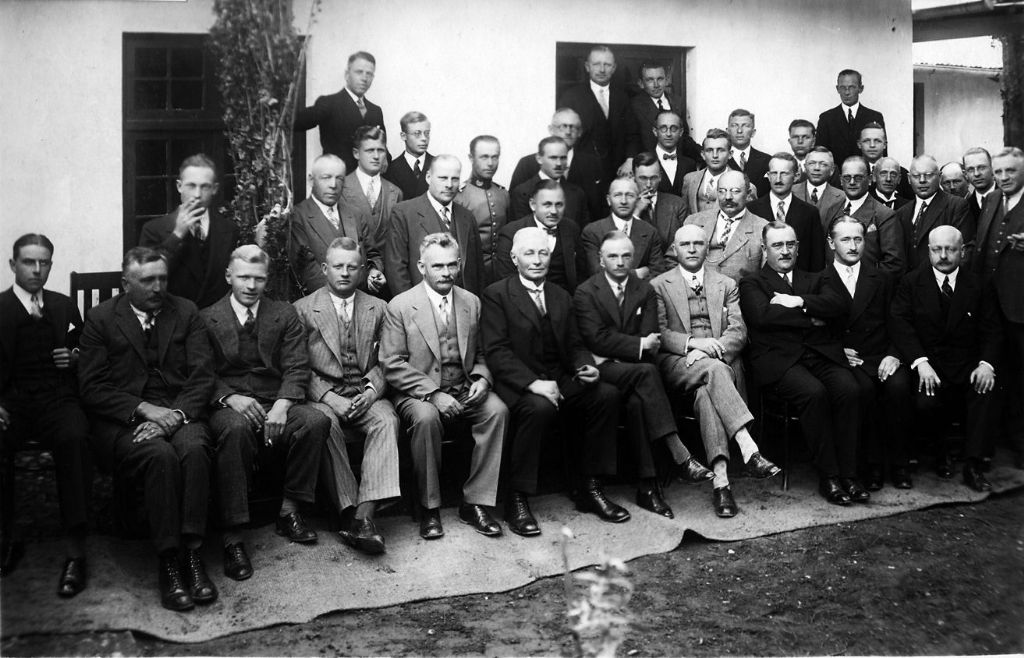
Members of the German colony in La Paz

The main descendants of Europeans in Bolivia are Germans with 260,000 descendants in 2002 to about 430,000 descendants today. They are followed by Italians with more than 15,600 descendants and Croatians with more than 8,000. There are also some 12,000 Portuguese descendants.

Considering that 15% of Bolivians are predominantly of European descent, the number of mestizos and whites of Spanish blood would be approximately 4.2 million.

Year	Spanish nationals in Bolivia
1990	1644
1995	▲1651
2000	▲1641
2005	▲6059
2010	▲10463
2015	▲12181
2017	▲12679
2020	▲13568
2023	▲16449
2025	▲17773

Year	German nationals in Bolivia
1990	1351
1995	▲1524
2000	▲1682
2005	▲1711
2010	▲1737
2015	▲2022
2017	▲2104
2020	▲2251

=== Others ===
The Greeks and their descendants are about 4100, the other European descendants not counting immigrants (such as Americans, British and Jews) make about 10,000.

The descendants of Arabs number about 70,000 and form more than 2,500 families with 600 different surnames.

=== Surveys ===
According to the World statesmen in 2001, white Bolivians represent 10% of the total and of these 3% correspond to German descendants.

According to Universia in 2013, whites in Bolivia represent 22%, as well as the indigenous population. A 2014 survey by Ipsos, 3 percent of people questioned said they were white.

== Geographic distribution ==
Geographically, Bolivia's white and mestizo population tends to be concentrated in the eastern lowlands of the country (such as Santa Cruz) and in Tarija, which would be the "Media Luna" region. Historically, white and mestizo Bolivians in this region have been relatively wealthier compared to the Andean region, where they have been poorer and predominantly indigenous in Bolivia. Meanwhile, in the altiplano and valley ecoregions, whites have disproportionately made up the upper and upper-middle classes, especially in the cities of La Paz, Cochabamba, and Sucre.

=== 1900 census ===
The 1900 Bolivian census, a person who self-identified as “white” was a descendant of a foreigner, principally a Spaniard. This was the last census to ask a more detailed question about ethnic background. Overall there are Italians, Spanish, Germans and French. In total, they represented 12.7 percent of the total population with large populations in Cochabamba (60,605) and Santa Cruz de la Sierra (59,470) representing 36.8 percent combined.

Departments	Men	Women	Total	%
Beni	2,981	2,132	5,113	15.88
Chuquisaca	15,413	16,354	31,767	15.53
Cochabamba	28,938	31,667	60,605	18.46
La Paz	18,340	17,915	36,255	8.13
Oruro	3,996	3,778	7,774	9.03
National territory	202	5	207	0.64
Potosí	11,229	10,484	21,713	6.66
Santa Cruz	29,672	29,798	59,470	28.37
Tarija	4,368	3,816	8,184	7.95
Republic of Bolivia	115,139	115,949	231,088	12.72

=== Mennonites ===
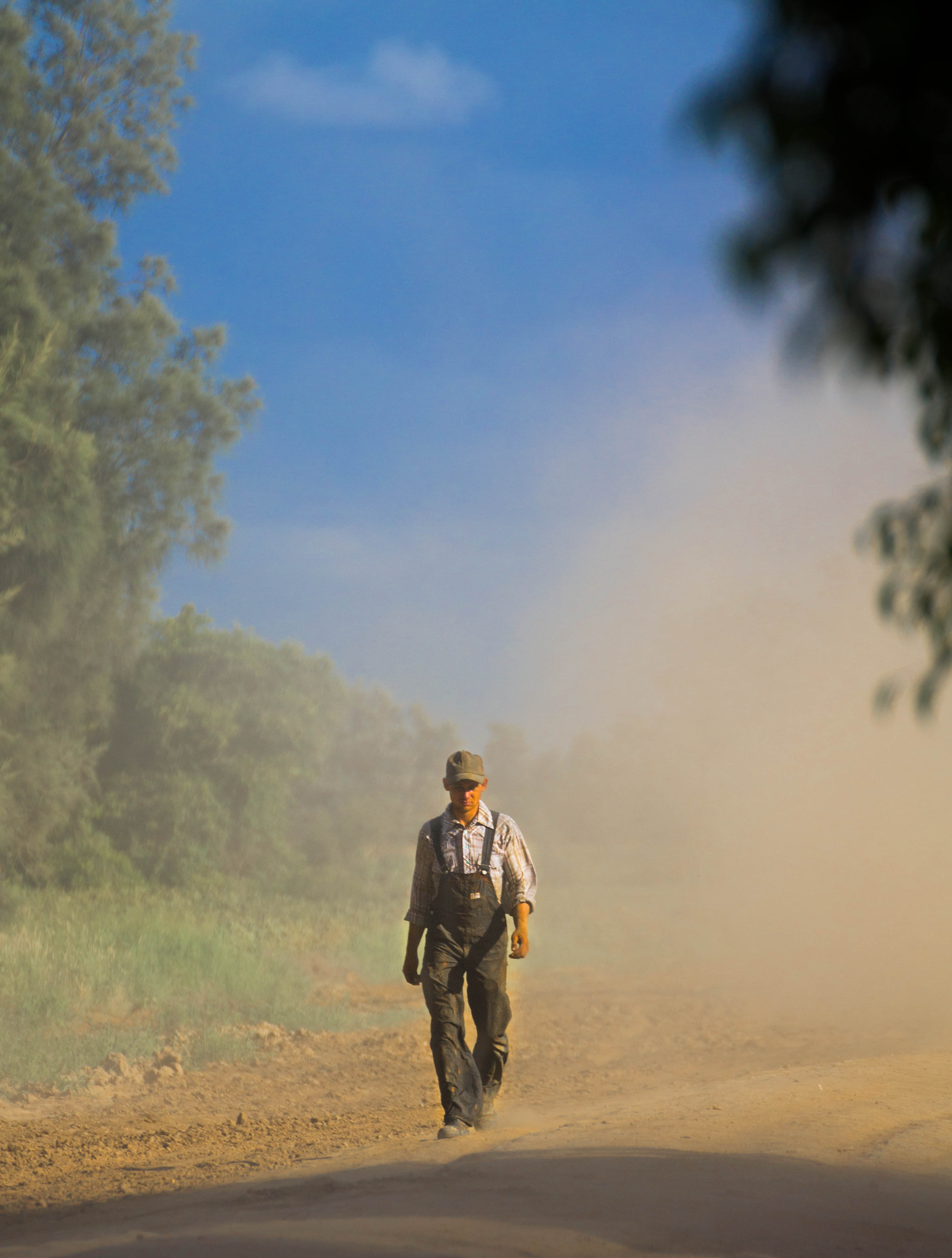
Mennonite man in Santa Cruz Department.

In 1995, there were a total of 25 Mennonite colonies in Bolivia with a total population of 28,567. The most populous ones were Riva Palacios (5,488), Swift Current (2,602), Nueva Esperanza (2,455), Valle Esperanza (2,214) and Santa Rita (1,748). In 2002 there were 40 Mennonite colonies with a population of about 38,000 people. An outreach of Conservative Mennonites can be found at La Estrella, with others in progress.

The total population was estimated at 60,000 by Lisa Wiltse in 2010. In 2012 there were 23,818 church members in congregations of Russian Mennonites, indicating a total population of about 70,000. Another 1,170 Mennonites were in Spanish-speaking congregations. The number of colonies was 57 in 2011. In the Santa Cruz Department there is an important colony (70.000 inhabitants) of German-speaking Mennonites.

Mennonites in Bolivia currently number an estimated 150,000 located on some 900,000 hectares of land.

== Culture ==
The European cultural contribution is reflected throughout the country, in language, religion, music, architecture, customs (and values), gastronomy and clothing. Each department integrated these elements in a different way, combining them with the indigenous and mestizo heritage of each region.

=== Pollera ===
The clothing of the "Bolivian chola", the pollera, is an amalgam of elements initially imposed on the indigenous people of the altiplano by the colonial system that limited the use of clothing identified as belonging to pre-Hispanic American cultures, and elements and materials redefined through time and subsequent cultural processes. A system of categorization of clothing assigned by region and caste was imposed, which at that time was popular in the Iberian Peninsula, "la moda chula", with ankle-length skirts, Sevillian mantillas and high-heeled half-ankle boots.

=== Caporales ===
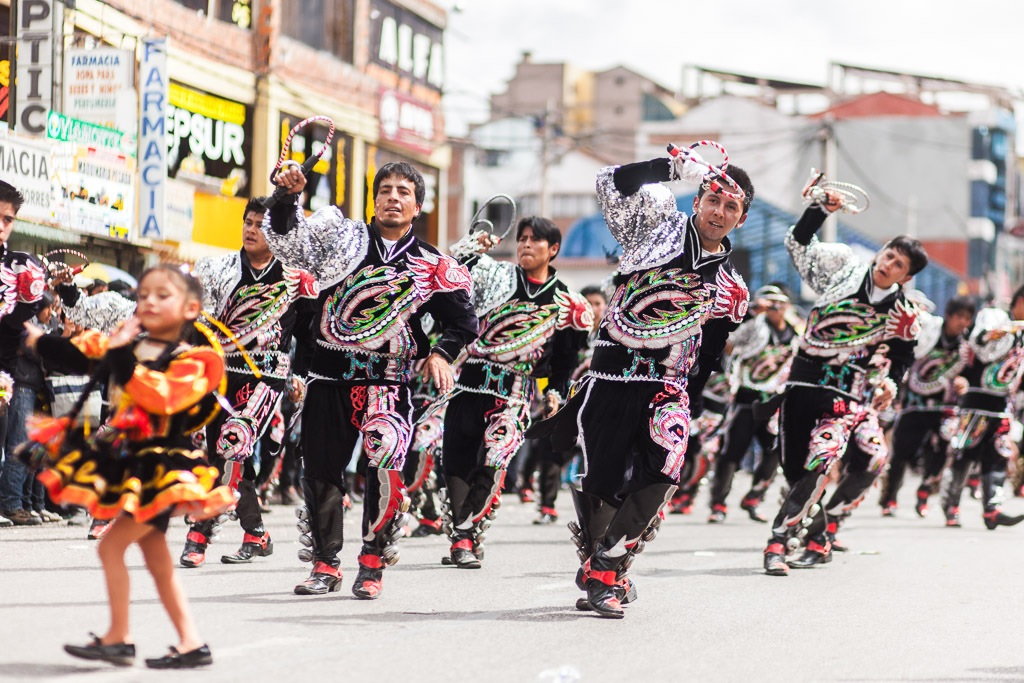
Caporales dancers in modernity from Bolivia. (2016)

Caporales is a dance popular in the Andean region of Bolivia. It gained popularity in 1969 by the Estrada Pacheco brothers, inspired by the character of the 'Caporal' or "overseer" of which, historically black slaves, usually mixed race, wore boots and held a whip, the dance originates from the region of the Yungas in Bolivia. The dance has European elements especially with the costumes.

=== Valleys ===
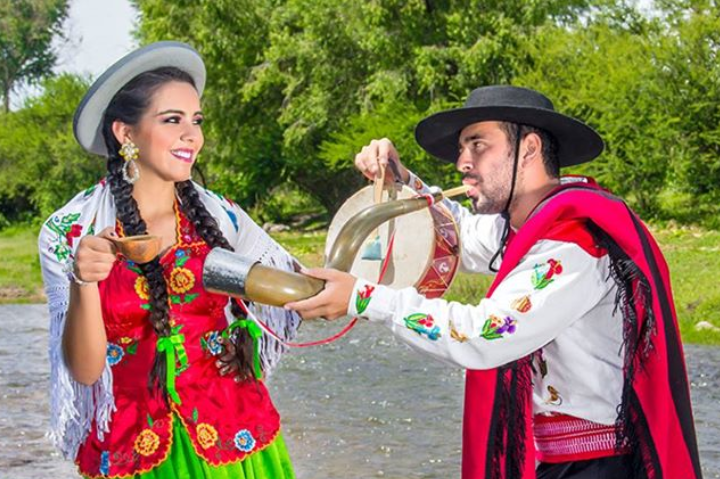
Chapaca culture of Tarija

The culture of the Tarija valley is characterized by Spanish, German, Guacho, and indigenous contributions, among which the Guarani and Quechua are the most important.

Sucre was an important political and cultural center during the colonial period, which gave rise to a fashion influenced by the Spanish nobility, adapted to the social context. The garment reflected the power of social status, the closeness to the European and was a symbol of luxury. In addition to the dress, fans, parasols, scarves and brooches were used, and it was also common to find them adorned with precious stones.

=== Plains ===
In the Amazon, there is more indigenous contribution, however, due to the Franciscan and Jesuit missions, most of the Amazonian culture has its origin in Europe, or from the Spanish colonizers.

In Santa Cruz, the culture has notable European contributions, mainly Spanish, mixed with the Chiquitano, Guarani and other Amazonian ethnic groups. The music is characterized by its diversity of rhythms and the use of the guitar, accompanied by the bass drum, violin and harp, especially in the Chiquitania, where the Jesuits introduced these instruments in the seventeenth and eighteenth centuries.

The dance of the macheteros, one of the best known dances of Beni, also has its origins in the colony, since it symbolizes the resurrection of Christ.

The culture of Pando, on the other hand, is marked by the Spanish influence, but above all by the boom of the rubber band, where indigenous groups from Beni, businessmen from Santa Cruz and Portuguese rubber tappers were involved.

== Notable White Bolivians ==
- Jimena Antelo, Bolivian journalist
- Claudia Arce, model
- Romina Rocamonje, Bolivian model
- Fernando Saucedo, Bolivian soccer player
- Carlos Lampe, Bolivian soccer player
- Álvaro García Linera, Bolivian politician and former vice president
- Samuel Doria Medina, Bolivian politician
- Chris Syler, Bolivian singer-songwriter
- Gonzalo Sánchez de Lozada, Politician and former president
- Sara Ugarte de Salamanca, Bolivian poet
- Jaime Dunn, Bolivian politician

=== Bolivian Germans ===
- Ronald Rivero Kuhn, Bolivian soccer player
- Hugo Banzer, military officer, twice president
- Germán Busch, military officer and former president
- Luciano Durán Böger, writer and poet
- Enrique Hertzog, doctor and former president
- Pato Hoffmann, actor and theater director
- Noel Kempff, biologist and environmentalist
- Jaime Mirtenbaum Zenamon, classical guitarist and composer
- Alberto Natusch, military officer and dictator
- Erwin Sánchez Freking, Bolivian soccer player
- Achim von Kries, German military officer
- Blanca Wiethüchter, writer and poet
- Jorge Wilstermann, aviator
- Lidia Gueiler Tejada, Politician and former president (the first female president of Bolivia and the second woman in the Americas to become head of state)
- Luis Gamarra Mayser, singer-songwriter
- Rodrigo Mendoza Heinrich, American war hero
- Pedro Kramer, historian and diplomat
- Dionisio Foianini Banzer, Bolivian politician and businessman

=== Italian Bolivians ===
- Claudia Arce, model
- Paolo Agazzi, film director and screenwriter
- Ángel Gelmi Bertocchi, bishop
- Roberto Capparelli, soccer player
- Óscar Cerruto, poet, novelist, short story writer, journalist, and diplomat
- Hilarión Daza, military officer and former president
- Pablo Escobar, soccer player
- Dionisio Foianini Banzer, politician and businessman
- Luigi Domenico Gismondi, photographer, photographic supplies salesman, and postcard publisher
- Teresa Gisbert de Mesa, architect and historian

=== Bolivian Croats ===
- Branko Marinkovic, businessman
- Karen Longaric, lawyer, professor, politician, and former Foreign Minister of Bolivia
- Rajka Baković, Croatian-Bolivian student and anti-fascist activist, who, together with her sister Zdenka, were known as the "Baković Sisters" during World War II
- Mirko Tomianovic, professional soccer player
- Ivo Kuljis, businessman and founder and owner of Kupel, Banco Económico, and Red Uno de Bolivia

== See also ==
- Caporales
- Croatian Bolivians
- German Bolivians
- Indigenous peoples in Bolivia
- Italian Bolivians
- Mennonites in Bolivia
- Mestizos in Bolívia
- History of the Jews in Bolivia
