= Magdalena Cajías =

Bolivian historian and politician (born 1957)

Consul General of Bolivia in Santiago
- In office 9 April 2014 – 18 March 2019
- President: Evo Morales
- Preceded by: Ramiro de la Fuente
- Succeeded by: Ramiro Guerrero

Minister of Education and Cultures
- In office 8 June 2007 – 7 November 2008
- President: Evo Morales
- Preceded by: Víctor Cáceres
- Succeeded by: Roberto Aguilar

Personal details
- Born: María Magdalena Cajías de la Vega; 8 October 1957 (age 69) La Paz, Bolivia
- Party: Independent
- Parents: Huáscar Cajías; Beatriz de la Vega
- Relatives: Cajías family
- Education: Higher University of San Andrés; Latin American Faculty of Social Sciences; Michoacán College
- Occupation: Educator; historian; politician

María Magdalena Cajías de la Vega (born 8 October 1957) is a Bolivian academic, historian, and politician who served as minister of education from 2007 to 2008. Cajías spent most of her professional career teaching history at the Higher University of San Andrés, in addition to holding a number of consultancy posts for intergovernmental organizations and government bodies. She authored multiple published historical titles, focusing on the fields of women's and labor history. In 2006, Cajías was brought on as a consultant for the Ministry of the Presidency before being appointed to head the Ministry of Education the following year. After a brief return to academia following the conclusion of her ministerial term, Cajías returned to public administration as consul general in Santiago, where she served from 2014 to 2019. In 2021, she was named as a member of the editorial board of the Bolivian Bicentennial Library.

== Early life and career ==
Magdalena Cajías was born on 8 October 1957 in La Paz, the sixth of ten children born to Huáscar Cajías and Beatriz de la Vega. She is a member of the academically prestigious Cajías family; her father, the patriarch of the clan, was a respected journalist and intellectual, notable for having founded and directed Presencia, the premier periodical of the second half of the twentieth century. Of her five sisters and four brothers, most followed academic careers, becoming authors, historians, and professors. Others, such as Cajías's elder siblings, Fernando and Lupe, also exercised prominent public functions, the former having served as prefect of La Paz while the latter was the chief anti-corruption officer during the administration of Carlos Mesa.

As with her other siblings, Cajías attended the Marshal Braun German School, where she completed her primary and secondary schooling. After that, she attended the Higher University of San Andrés (UMSA), graduating with a bachelor's in history from its Faculty of Humanities in 1984. She went on to complete a master's in Andean history at the Latin American Faculty of Social Sciences (FLACSO) in Quito, Ecuador, in 1987 before receiving a doctorate in social science from Mexico's Michoacán College in 2011. During this time, Cajías also took master's-level courses in several fields, including creative writing at the UMSA, political science at FLACSO-La Paz, and film at the La Paz School of Cinema and Audiovisual Arts.

Cajías taught courses in contemporary history at the UMSA's Faculty of Humanities from the 1980s onwards. She was a founding member and researcher at the Bolivian Institute of Studies, in addition to holding membership in other academic bodies, including the Bolivian Academy of History and the Coordinator of Associated History Researchers. Outside of academia, Cajías held numerous roles as a consultant, such as for the Organization of Ibero-American States and for member states of the Andrés Bello Agreement. Between 1991 and 1994, she was a permanent consultant for the Ministry of Finance's Directorate of Coordination with NGOs (DCONGs) before assuming as director of DCONGs from 1994 to 1998.

== Political career ==
With the assumption of Evo Morales in 2006, Cajías was brought on as a permanent advisor and consultant on matters of history for the Ministry of the Presidency. She held the post for approximately a year before being promoted to head the Ministry of Education following Morales's ouster of Víctor Cáceres, the previous officeholder. Although Morales expressed his trust in Cajías's management ability, her selection nonetheless faced pushback from some government-aligned sectors. For one, she was not an active partisan of Morales's party, the Movement for Socialism. More importantly, however, the appointment of a university academic was controversial among rural and urban teachers' unions. Given historical mistrust and rivalries between the two sectors, the unions expressed their discontent that a school professor had not been designated instead.

Cajías's short year-long tenure focused its efforts on Morales's campaign to eradicate illiteracy across the country. The project, known as the "Yes I Can" National Literacy Program, had been initiated in 2006 and had reached fifty percent of its goal just over six months after Cajías took office. With preexisting funding from Cuba and Venezuela and additional aid her office secured from Spain in early 2008, Cajías's time helming the Ministry of Education saw significant advances in combating illiteracy. In March 2008, Oruro became the first department to be declared free of illiteracy, bringing the project to seventy-six percent completion. Santa Cruz became the second department to complete its goal in October, with Morales declaring Bolivia fully free of illiteracy in December. By that point, however, Cajías was no longer in office to see the campaign's completion. In early November, she was unexpectedly replaced as minister by Roberto Aguilar, with Morales stating that excessive bureaucracy and lack of ideological commitment on the part of her staff had affected Cajías management, though he still took time to celebrate her time office.

Following the conclusion of her ministerial term, Cajías returned to academic functions at the UMSA, where she was named professor emeritus. She also rededicated herself to historical research, focusing on the histories of mining and labor movements, work that culminated in the publication of her doctoral thesis covering the mining settlement of Huanuni. After over half a decade in private practice, Cajías returned to public administration at the invitation of Morales, who designated her as consul general in Santiago, Chile, in 2014. Her term focused on the defining topic of Bolivia–Chile relations, that being their shared territorial dispute, over which Bolivia had mounted a half-decade-long legal battle. She held the post until March 2019, leaving office a few months after the International Court of Justice ruled against Bolivia's demand. Most recently, in 2021, Cajías was selected to join other prominent authors and academics as a member of the editorial board of the Bicentennial Library, a project tasked with selecting and curating a list of the country's most important literary works.

== Publications ==
- Cajías de la Vega, Magdalena; Cajías de la Vega, Fernando (1995). La Historia de Bolivia y la Historia de la Coca (in Spanish). Rome: Centro Italiano di Solidarietà.
- ——————————————; Cajías de la Vega, Fernando (1997). Historia y Geografía de Bolivia: Guía del Estudiante (in Spanish). Madrid: Editorial Cultural.
- ——————————————; Jiménez Chávez, Iván (1997). Mujeres en las Minas de Bolivia (PDF) (in Spanish). La Paz: Ministerio de Desarollo Humano. OCLC 37755448.
- ——————————————; Arze, Silvia; Medinaceli, Ximena (1997). Mujeres en Rebelión: La Presencia Femenina en las Rebeliones de Charcas del Siglo XVIII (PDF) (in Spanish). La Paz: Ministerio de Desarrollo Humano. OCLC 38304018.
- —————————————— (2002). Así fue la Revolución: Cincuentenario de la Revolución del 9 de Abril de 1952 (in Spanish). La Paz: Fundación Cultural Huáscar Cajías Kauffman. OCLC 51799500.
- —————————————— (2007). ACLO 40 Años: Palabra, Compromiso y Acción con el Campesino (in Spanish). Sucre: Fundación Acción Cultural Loyola.
- ——————————————; Adriázola, Paola (2009). La Paz en el Siglo XX (in Spanish). La Paz: Santillana Ediciones. OCLC 654779171.
- —————————————— (2010). 50 Años de Radio Nacional Huanuni: Junto a las Luchas de los Trabajadores Mineros (in Spanish). La Paz: Instituto de Estudios Bolivianos; ASDI-SAREC; Radio Nacional Huanuni. OCLC 796077897.
- —————————————— (2011). Continuidades y Rupturas: El Proceso Histórico de la Formación Docente Rural y Urbana en Bolivia (in Spanish). La Paz: Programa de Investigación Estratégica en Bolivia. ISBN 978-99954-57-01-3.
- —————————————— (2013). El Poder de la Memoria: La Mina de Huanuni en la Historia del Movimiento Minero y la Minería del Estaño 1900–2010 (in Spanish). La Paz: Plural Editores; Departamento de Investigación Postgrado e Interacción Social; Instituto de Estudios Bolivianos.

Political offices
Preceded by Víctor Cáceres	Minister of Education and Cultures; 2007–2008	Succeeded by Roberto Aguilar
Diplomatic posts
Preceded by Ramiro de la Fuente	Consul General of Bolivia in Santiago; 2014–2019	Succeeded by Ramiro Guerrero
