= German Bolivians =

German Bolivians Deutsche Bolivianer
Total population
- Different estimates: 57,000 Mennonites (Kopp, 2015).; 150,000 Mennonites in 2023 (Mongabay, 2023).; 60,000 Plautdietsch speakers (Salminen, 2007; in Ethnologue, 2019). (430,000); 430,000 (including those of ancestral descent)

Regions with significant populations
- Santa Cruz Department, Beni Department, La Paz, and Tarija.

Languages
- Bolivian Spanish, German, and Plautdietsch. Yiddish is spoken by German-Jewish communities.

Religion
- Christianity (Protestantism, Lutheranism, Reformed, Mennonite, Amish, Roman Catholicism) and Judaism.

Related ethnic groups
- Germans; Austrian Americans; German Mexican; German Brazilians; German Argentines; German diaspora

German Bolivians are Bolivians of full, partial, or predominantly German descent, or German-born people residing in Bolivia.

== Waves of immigration ==
German immigrants began to arrive in Bolivia in the 18th century, and many more arrived in the 19th century. During World War II, Bolivia ceased diplomatic relations with Germany and expelled many Germans. Many German Jews immigrated to Bolivia during the war. Inti SA, Bolivia's largest pharmaceutical company, was founded by German immigrant Ernesto W. N. Schilling Huhn.

A substantial and growing part of the Germanic population in Bolivia are Plautdietsch-speaking Mennonites from Russia, who are of Dutch and Prussian descent. These Mennonites started to immigrate in the 1950s, with large waves of immigrants in the 1960s and 1970s, mainly from Mexico and Paraguay. In 2012 there were 23,818 church members in congregations of these Mennonites, indicating a total population of about 70,000. The total population of German Mennonites in Bolivia was estimated at 60,000 by Lisa Wiltse in 2010. See also: Mennonites in Bolivia.

== Education ==
German schools:

- Deutsche Schule La Paz
- Deutsche Schule Santa Cruz

Historic German schools:

- Deutsche Schule Oruro
- Deutsche Schule Sucre

== Notable German Bolivians ==
- Ronald Rivero Kuhn, footballer
- Hugo Banzer, military officer, twice President
- Germán Busch, military officer and President
- Luciano Durán Böger, writer and poet
- Enrique Hertzog, physician and President
- Pato Hoffmann, actor and theater director
- Noel Kempff, biologist and environmentalist
- Jaime Mirtenbaum Zenamon, classical guitarist and composer
- Alberto Natusch, military officer and dictator
- Erwin Sánchez Freking, footballer
- Achim von Kries, German military officer
- Blanca Wiethüchter, writer and poet
- Jorge Wilstermann, aviator
- Lidia Gueiler Tejada, politician (the first female President of Bolivia, and the second woman in the Americas to ever become chief of state).
- Luis Gamarra Mayser, singer and songwriter
- Rodrigo Mendoza Heinrich, American War Hero
- Pedro Kramer, Historian and diplomat

== See also ==
- Bolivia–Germany relations
- Immigration to Bolivia
- Mennonites in Bolivia
- History of the Jews in Bolivia
