= Demographics of Bolivia =

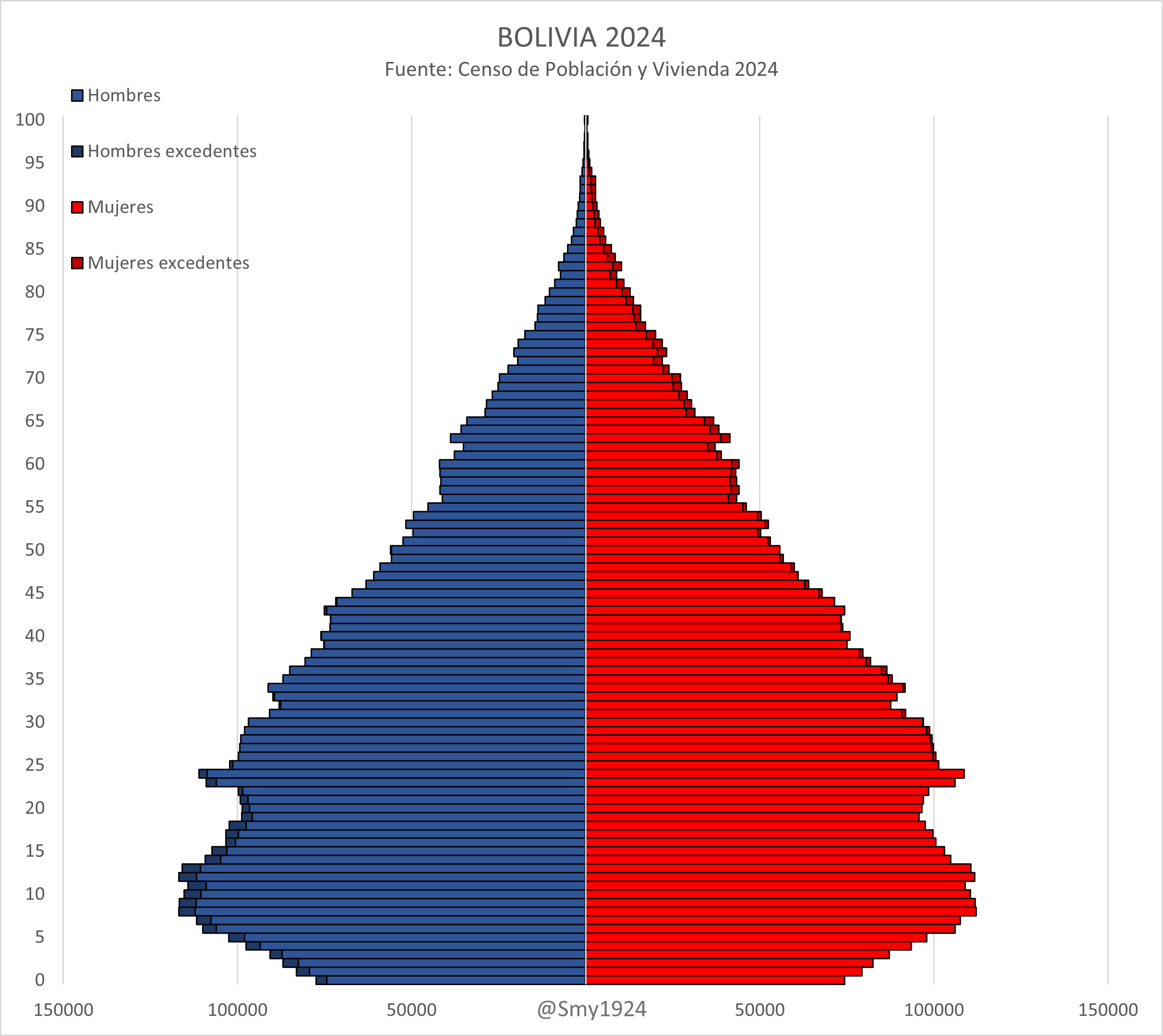
- Bolivia population pyramid in 2024
- Population: 11,312,620 (2024 census)
- Density: 11.36/km^{2} (2024 est.)
- Growth rate: 1.2% (2022 est.)
- Birth rate: 14.2 births/1,000 population (2025 est.)
- Death rate: 5.0 deaths/1,000 population (2024 est.)
- Life expectancy: 68.87 years (2014)
  - male: 65.4 years (2013)
  - female: 71.1 years (2013)
- Fertility rate: 1.56 children born/woman (2026)
- Infant mortality: 22.3 deaths/1,000 live births (2024)
- Net migration rate: −1.00 migrant(s)/1,000 population

Age structure
- 0–14 years: 30.30% (2024 est.)
- 15–64 years: 64.77% (2024 est.)
- 65 and over: 4.93% (2024 est.)

Sex ratio
- Total: 0.99 male/female (2012)
- Under 15: 1.05 male/female (2012)
- 15–64 years: 0.96 male/female (2012)
- 65 and over: 0.88 male/female (2012)

Nationality
- Nationality: Bolivian
- Major ethnic: Mixed (N/D)
- Minor ethnic: Native (40.58%); Quechua (18.52%); Aymara (17.22%); Chiquitano (1.27%); Guaraní (0.85%); Others (2.48%); White (15.0%); Spanish (N/D); German (N/D); Italian (N/D); Others (N/D); Black (0.23%); East Asian (N/D); Japanese (N/D); Others (N/D); Others (N/D)

Language
- Official: Spanish (44.89%); Quechua (25.08%); Aymara (16.77%); Guarani (0.69%); 34 other native languages
- Spoken: Languages of Bolivia

The demographic characteristics of the population of Bolivia are known from censuses, with the first census undertaken in 1826 and the most recent in 2024. The National Institute of Statistics of Bolivia (INE) has performed this task since 1950. The population of Bolivia in 2024 reached 11 million for the first time in history. The population density is 11.36 inhabitants per square kilometer, and the overall life expectancy in Bolivia at birth is 68.2 years. The population has steadily risen from the late 1800s to the present time. The natural growth rate of the population is positive, which has been a continuing trend since the 1950s; in 2012, Bolivia's birth rate continued to be higher than the death rate. Bolivia is in the third stage of demographic transition. In terms of age structure, the population is dominated by the 15–64 segment. The median age of the population is 23.1, and the gender ratio of the total population is 0.99 males per female.

Bolivia is inhabited mostly by Mestizo, Quechua and Aymara, while minorities include 37 indigenous groups (0.3% average per group). Spanish, Quechua, Aymara, Guarani languages, as well as 34 other native languages are the official languages of Bolivia. Spanish is the most-spoken language (60.7%) within the population. The main religions of Bolivia are the Catholic Church (81.8%), Evangelicalism (11.5%), and Protestantism (2.6%). There is a literacy rate of 91.2%. An estimated 7.6% of the country's gross domestic product (GDP) is spent on education. The average monthly household income was Bs.1,378 ($293) in 1994. In December 2013 the unemployment rate was 3.2% of the working population. The average urbanization rate in Bolivia is 67%.

== Population size and structure ==
The first true estimate of the population of Bolivia came in 1826, in which 997,427 inhabitants were estimated. This number was calculated from the 1796 census organized by Francisco Gil de Taboada, which consisted of several Bolivian cities. The first modern census was completed in 1831, and ten have been completed since then. The organizer of Bolivia's censuses has changed throughout the years—Andrés de Santa Cruz (1831), The Bolivian Statistical Office (1835, 1854, 1882), The Bolivian Statistical Commission (1845), The National Immigration Bureau and The Statistics and Geographic Propaganda (1900), and The Department of Statistics and Censuses (1950)—with the INE conducting the census since 1976. The national census is supposed to be conducted every ten years, however, the 2012 census was late because of "climatic factors and the financing." The 2012 census was conducted on 21 November 2012, in which 10,027,254 inhabitants were in the country. The estimated cost of the census was $50 million.

With a population of 10.0 million in 2012, Bolivia ranks 87th in the world by population. Its population density is 9.13 inhabitants per square kilometer. The overall life expectancy in Bolivia is 65.4. The total fertility rate is 2.87 children per mother. Since 1950, the World Health Organization (WHO) estimates the birth rate exceeded the death rate of the country. The population of Bolivia has been increasing since 1900, and has only had a negative per annum growth rate twice in its history (1835 and 1882). Bolivia is in the third stage of demographic transition. There were 562,461 immigrants in Bolivia in 2012, with the most (40.5%) coming from Argentina. In 2008, there were 48,809 marriages in Bolivia, and 5,887 divorces throughout the country in 2011.

Census population

Year	Pop.	±% p.a.
1500	900,000	—
1600	800,000	−0.12%
1800	887,000	+0.05%
1826	997,427	+0.45%
1831	1,088,768	+1.77%
1835	1,060,777	−0.65%
1845	1,378,896	+2.66%
1854	2,326,126	+5.98%

Year	Pop.	±% p.a.
1882	1,172,156	−2.42%
1900	1,555,818	+1.59%
1950	2,704,165	+1.11%
1976	4,613,486	+2.08%
1992	6,420,792	+2.09%
2001	8,274,325	+2.86%
2012	10,027,254	+1.76%
2024	11,365,333	+1.05%

Source: 1500–1800, 1826, 1831–2001, 2012

=== Structure of the population ===
Population by Sex and Age Group (Census 21.XI.2012):

Age group	Male	Female	Total	%
Total	5,019,447	5,040,409	10,059,856	100
0–4	556 294	533 654	1,089,948	10.83
5–9	504 623	488 031	992 654	9.87
10–14	549 866	528 298	1,078,164	10.72
15–19	559 285	546 999	1,106,284	11.00
20–24	493 018	485 588	978 606	9.73
25–29	407 293	410 102	817 395	8.13
30–34	372 197	381 634	753 831	7.49
35–39	310 162	320 870	631 032	6.27
40–44	270 971	273 730	544 701	5.41
45–49	228 006	233 978	461 984	4.59
50–54	199 526	203 694	403 220	4.01
55–59	159 128	164 897	324 025	3.22
60–64	134 457	145 410	279 867	2.78
65–69	98 098	106 431	204 529	2.03
70–74	71 902	80 521	152 423	1.52
75–79	44 974	54 302	99 276	0.99
80–84	36 230	46 633	81 095	0.81
85–89	15 884	22 039	37 923	0.38
90–94	5 996	8 669	14 665	0.15
95+	3 305	4 929	8 234	0.08
Age group	Male	Female	Total	Percent
0–14	1,610,783	1,549,983	3,160,766	31.42
15–64	3,134,043	3,166,902	6,300,945	62.63
65+	274 621	323 524	598 145	5.95

Population Estimates by Sex and Age Group (30.VI.2021) (Post-censal estimates.):

Age group	Male	Female	Total	%
Total	5,942,680	5,899,275	11,841,955	100
0–4	606 704	579 895	1,186,599	10.02
5–9	601 078	575 782	1,176,860	9.94
10–14	597 961	573 142	1,171,103	9.89
15–19	581 257	558 347	1,139,604	9.62
20–24	550 323	532 134	1,082,457	9.14
25–29	501 680	489 601	991 281	8.37
30–34	447 560	440 794	888 354	7.50
35–39	395 180	392 667	787 847	6.65
40–44	343 308	344 277	687 585	5.81
45–49	292 693	296 530	589 223	4.98
50–54	245 514	251 305	496 819	4.20
55–59	204 273	211 440	415 713	3.51
60–64	168 434	177 590	346 024	2.92
65–69	137 622	148 843	286 465	2.42
70–74	109 295	121 554	230 849	1.95
75–79	77 830	91 134	168 964	1.43
80–84	46 014	58 571	104 585	0.88
85–89	23 748	33 817	57 565	0.49
90–94	9 464	15 808	25 272	0.21
95+	2 742	6 044	8 786	0.07
Age group	Male	Female	Total	Percent
0–14	1,805,743	1,728,819	3,534,562	29.85
15–64	3,730,222	3,694,685	7,424,907	62.70
65+	406 715	475 771	882 486	7.45

== Vital statistics ==
Year	Population	Births	Deaths	Natural change	Crude birth rate	Crude death rate	Natural change	Fertility rates
1950	2,714	134	70	64	46.9	24.4	22.5	6.75
1955	3,100	149	73	76	46.8	23.0	23.8	6.75
1960	3,353	163	77	86	45.9	21.5	24.4	6.63
1965	3,751	181	81	100	45.4	20.2	25.2	6.56
1970	4,217	203	85	118	45.3	19.0	26.3	6.50
1975	4,786	208	81	127	41.1	16.0	25.1	5.80
1980	5,369	220	76	144	38.6	13.3	25.3	5.30
1985	6,041	238	72	166	37.1	11.3	25.8	5.00
1990	6,794	259	71	188	36.0	9.9	25.1	4.8
1995	7,635	263	71	192	32.7	8.9	23.8	4.32
2000	8,495	270	72	198	30.3	8.1	22.2	3.96
2005	9,355	267	73	194	27.3	7.5	19.8	3.50
2010	10,157	274	76	198	25.9	7.1	18.8	3.25
2015	11,025	282	79	203	24.5	6.9	17.6	3.04
• All statistics are per 1,000 inhabitants • All data comes from estimations from the United Nations.

=== Births and deaths ===
Year	Population	Live births	Deaths	Natural increase	Crude birth rate	Crude death rate	Rate of natural increase	Crude migration rate	TFR
2010	10,076,577	299,426	45,349	254,077	29.7	4.5	25.2	–8.9	
2011	10,245,917	312,349	45,579	266,770	30.5	4.4	26.1	−8.5	
2012	10,423,115	310,954	48,427	262,527	29.8	4.6	25.2	−8.1	3.05
2013	10,594,727	304,895	50,120	254,775	28.8	4.7	24.1	−7.8	2.98
2014	10,755,947	294,117	50,847	243,270	27.3	4.7	22.6	−7.5	2.92
2015	10,920,682	283,011	50,476	232,535	25.9	4.6	21.3	−6.1	2.86
2016	11,083,605	261,122	51,875	209,247	23.6	4.7	18.9	−4.1	2.80
2017	11,242,712	251,232	50,847	200,385	22.3	4.5	17.8	−3.5	2.74
2018	11,386,715	219,790	52,380	167,410	19.3	4.6	14.7	−2.0	2.69
2019	11,514,867	229,906	53,194	176,712	20.0	4.6	15.4	−4.2	2.63
2020	11,640,016	213,247	79,613	133,634	18.3	6.8	11.5	–0.7	2.58
2021	11,733,918	225,439	86,461	138,978	19.2	7.4	11.8	–3.8	2.54
2022	11,798,231	214,599	66,611	147,988	18.2	5.6	12.6	–7.1	2.41(e)
2023	11,872,175	202,124	59,471	142,653	17.0	5.0	12.0	–6.2	2.24(e)
2024	11,916,453	186,578	60,081	126,497	15.7	5.0	10.7	−5.06	1.69
2025	11,945,263	170,159			14.2				1.61
2026	11,982,400								1.56

=== Fertility ===
Total Fertility Rate (TFR) (Wanted Fertility Rate) and Crude Birth Rate (CBR):

Year	CBR (Total)	TFR (Total)	CBR (Urban)	TFR (Urban)	CBR (Rural)	TFR (Rural)
1989		5,0 (3,2)		4,0 (2,6)		6,4 (4,1)
1994	34	4,8 (2,7)	32	3,8 (2,4)	37	6,3 (3,3)
1998	30.4	4,2 (2,5)	27.4	3,3 (2,2)	35.4	6,4 (3,2)
2003	28	3,8 (2,1)	26	3,1 (1,9)	32	5,5 (2,6)
2008	26	3,5 (2,0)	24	2,8 (1,9)	28	4,9 (2,4)

Years	1930	1931	1932	1933	1934	1935	1936	1937	1938	1939
Total Fertility Rate in Bolivia	6.48	6.49	6.50	6.52	6.53	6.54	6.55	6.56	6.57	6.59

Years	1940	1941	1942	1943	1944	1945	1946	1947	1948	1949
Total Fertility Rate in Bolivia	6.60	6.61	6.62	6.63	6.65	6.66	6.67	6.68	6.69	6.70

=== Life expectancy ===
Development of life expectancy

Period	Life expectancy in Years	Period	Life expectancy in Years
1950–1955	40.0	1985–1990	53.8
1955–1960	41.4	1990–1995	56.5
1960–1965	43.0	1995–2000	59.3
1965–1970	44.7	2000–2005	62.1
1970–1975	46.7	2005–2010	65.0
1975–1980	48.9	2010–2015	67.7
1980–1985	51.2		

Source: UN World Population Prospects

== Ethnic groups ==
Ethno-racial groups in Bolivia (2012 census)
1. No data (59.2%)
2. Native (40.6%)
3. Black (0.23%)
Ethnicity in Bolivia according to the CIA Factbook (2009)
1. Mestizo (68.0%)
2. Native (20.0%)
3. White (5.00%)
4. Cholo (2.00%)
5. Black (1.00%)
6. Others (4.00%)

According to a genetic study done on Bolivians, average values of Native American, European and African ancestry are 86%, 12.5%, and 1.5%, in individuals from La Paz and 76.8%, 21.4%, and 1.8% in individuals from Chuquisaca; respectively.

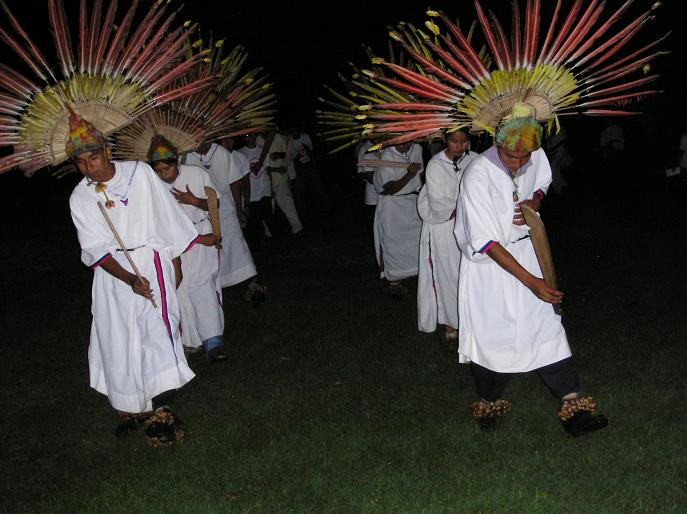
Danza de los macheteros, typical dance from San Ignacio de Moxos, Bolivia

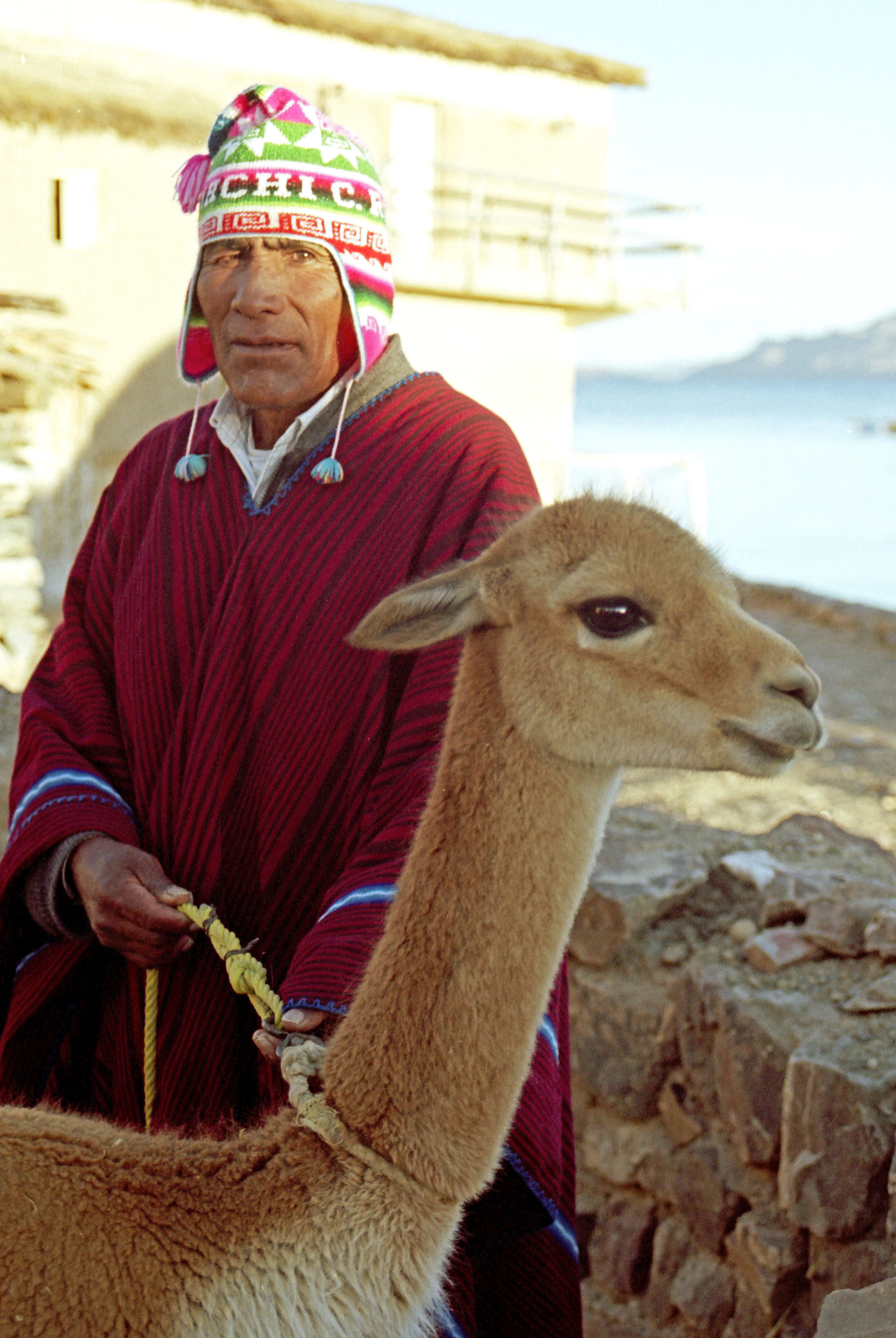
Aymara man, near Lake Titicaca, Bolivia

The vast majority of Bolivians are mestizo (with the indigenous component higher than the European one), although the government has not included the cultural self-identification "mestizo" in the November 2012 census. There are approximately three dozen native groups totaling approximately half of the Bolivian population – the largest proportion of indigenous people in the Americas. Exact numbers vary based on the wording of the ethnicity question and the available response choices. For example, the 2001 census did not provide the racial category "mestizo" as a response choice, resulting in a much higher proportion of respondents identifying themselves as belonging to one of the available indigenous ethnicity choices. Mestizos are distributed throughout the entire country and make up 26% of the Bolivian population, with the predominantly mestizo departments being Beni, Santa Cruz, and Tarija. Most people assume their mestizo identity while at the same time identifying themselves with one or more indigenous cultures. A 2018 estimate of racial classification put mestizo (mixed white and Amerindian) at 68%, indigenous at 20%, white at 5%, cholo at 2%, black at 1%, other at 4%, while 2% were unspecified; 44% attributed themselves to some indigenous group, predominantly the linguistic categories of Quechuas or Aymaras. White Bolivians comprised about 14% of the population in 2006, and are usually concentrated in the largest cities: La Paz, Santa Cruz de la Sierra and Cochabamba, but as well in some minor cities like Tarija and Sucre. The ancestry of whites and the white ancestry of mestizos lies most notably Spain, Italy, Germany, and Croatia. In the Santa Cruz Department, there are several dozen colonies of German-speaking Mennonites from Russia totaling around 40,000 inhabitants (as of 2012).

Afro-Bolivians, descendants of African slaves who arrived in the time of the Spanish Empire, inhabit the department of La Paz, and are located mainly in the provinces of Nor Yungas and Sud Yungas. Slavery was abolished in Bolivia in 1831. There are also important communities of Japanese (14,000) and Lebanese (12,900).

Indigenous peoples, also called "originarios" ("native" or "original") and less frequently, Amerindians, could be categorized by geographic area, such as Andean, like the Aymaras and Quechuas (who formed the ancient Inca Empire), who are concentrated in the western departments of La Paz, Potosí, Oruro, Cochabamba and Chuquisaca. There also are ethnic populations in the east, composed of the Chiquitano, Chané, Guaraní and Moxos, among others, who inhabit the departments of Santa Cruz, Beni, Tarija and Pando.

There are small numbers of European citizens from Germany, France, Italy and Portugal, as well as from other countries of the Americas, as Argentina, Brazil, Chile, Colombia, Cuba, Ecuador, the United States, Paraguay, Peru, Mexico and Venezuela, among others. There are important Peruvian colonies in La Paz, El Alto and Santa Cruz de la Sierra.

There are around 140,000 Mennonites in Bolivia of Friesian, Flemish and German ethnic origins.

A few Bolivians carry some Middle Eastern ancestry, mainly from Syria and Lebanon.

=== Indigenous peoples ===
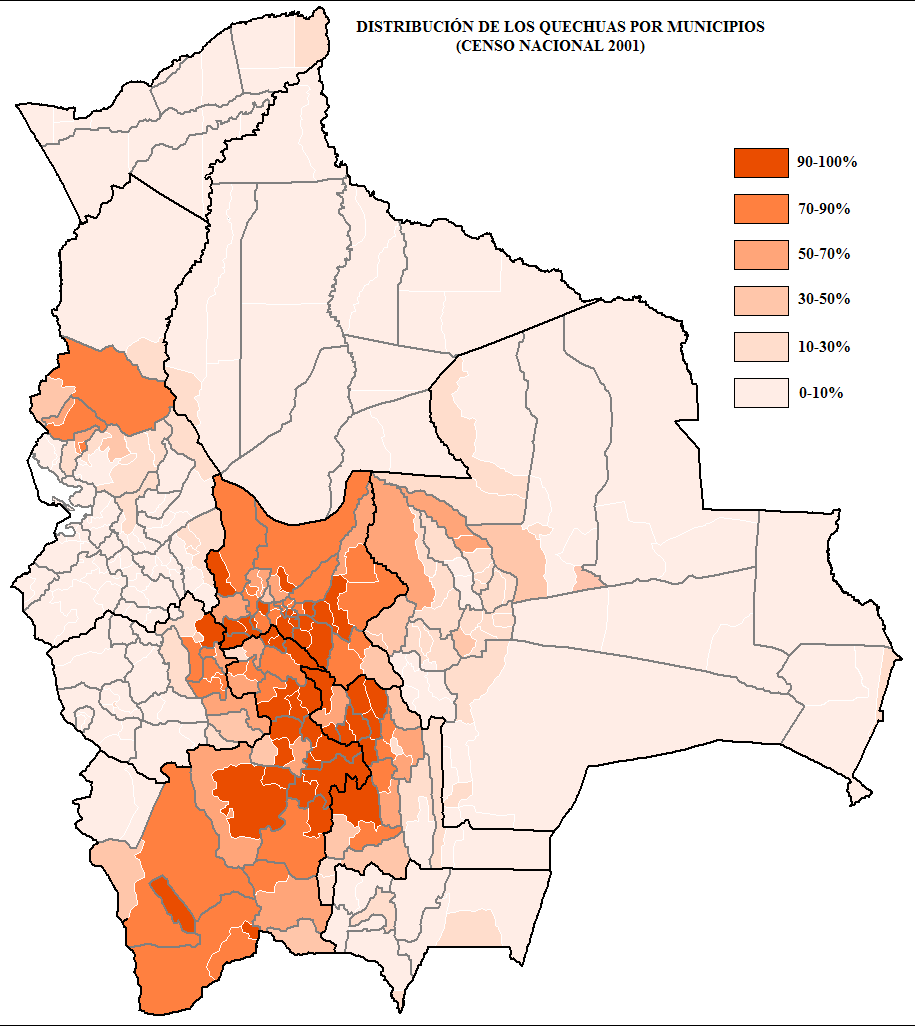
Distribution of Quechua people by municipality.

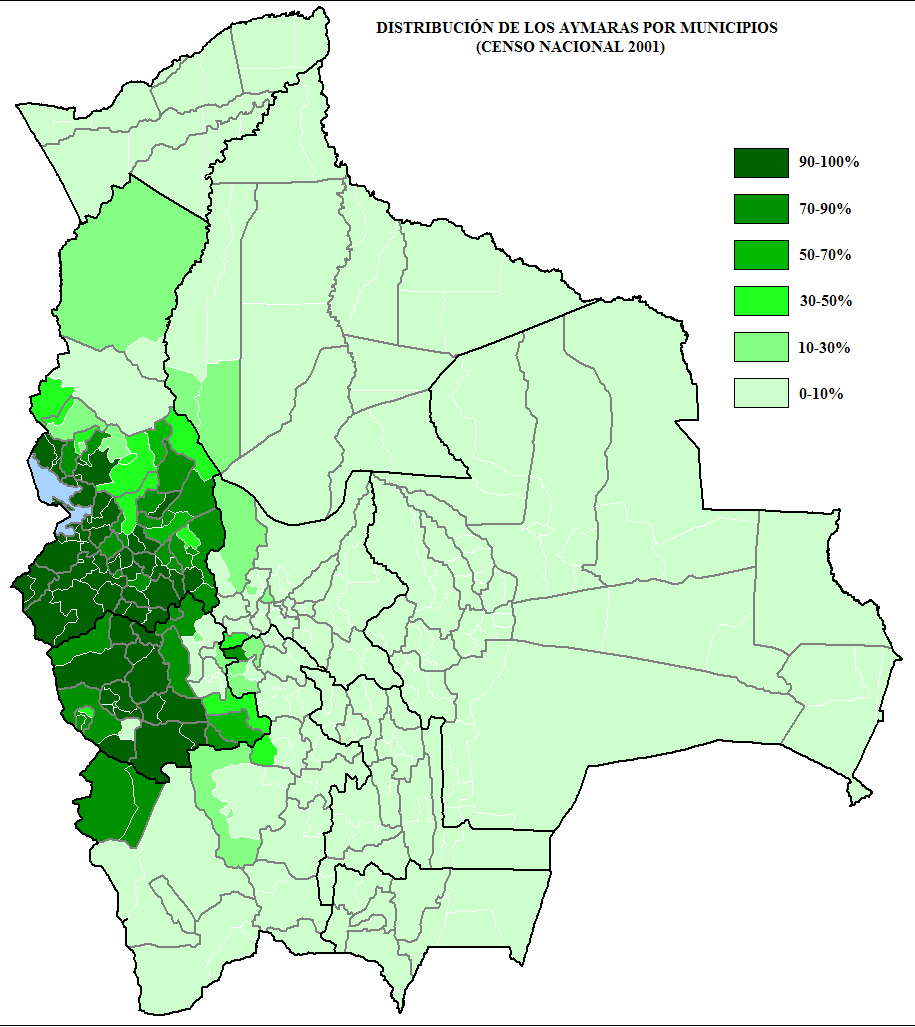
Distribution of Aymara people by municipality.

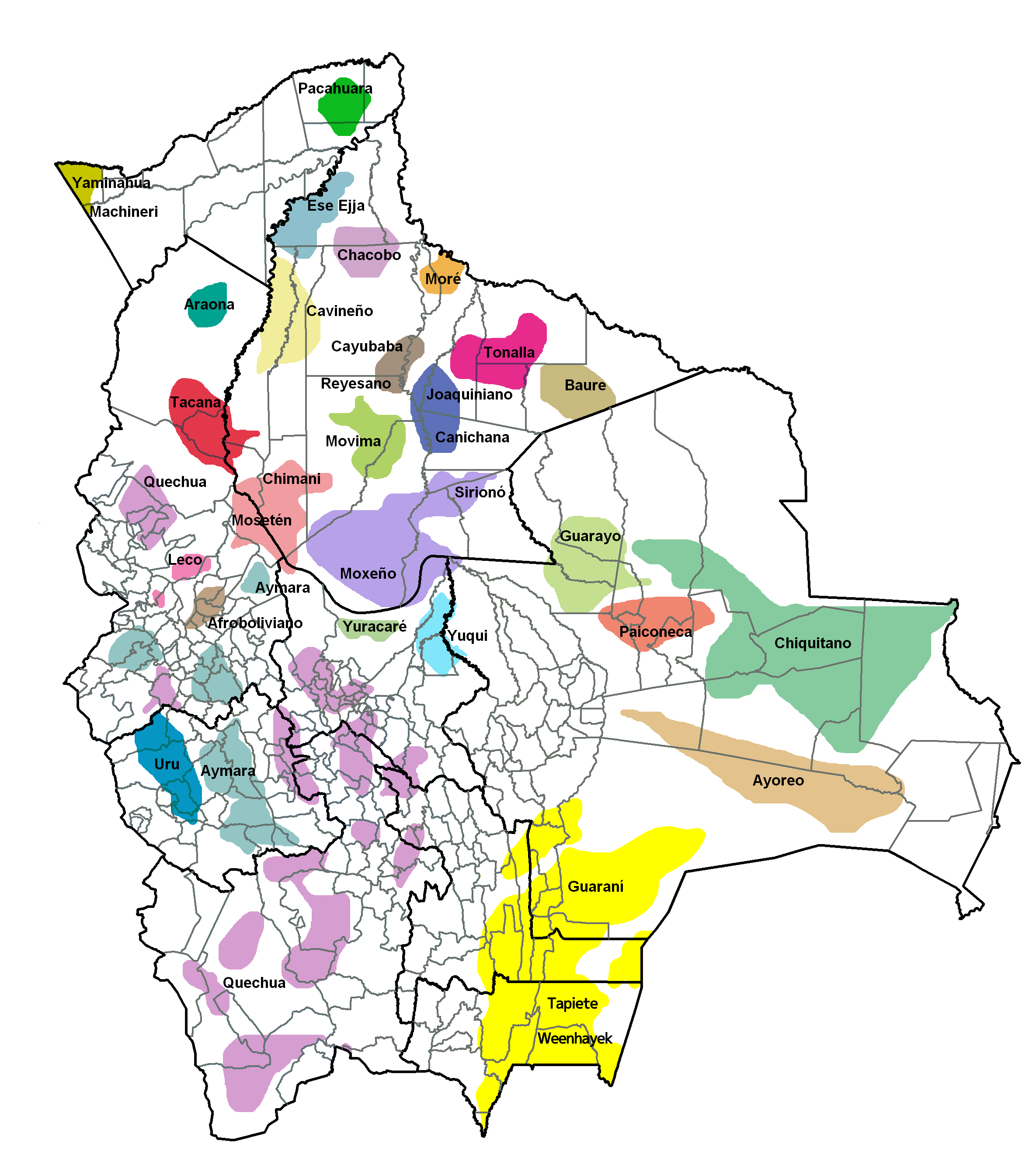
Map showing the area of indigenous peoples in Bolivia

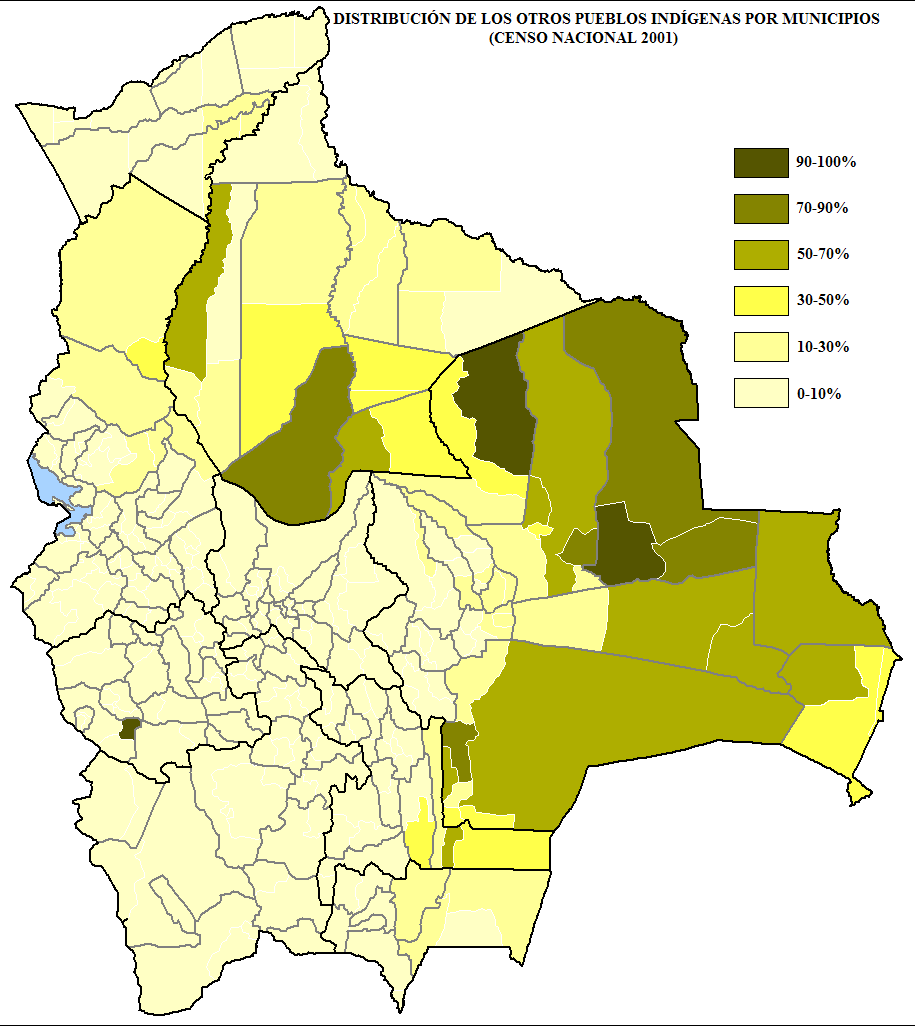
Distribution of other Bolivian indigenous peoples by municipality.

The Indigenous peoples of Bolivia can be divided into two categories of ethnic groups: the Andeans, who are located in the Andean Altiplano and the valley region; and the lowland groups, who inhabit the warm regions of central and eastern Bolivia, including the valleys of Cochabamba Department, the Amazon Basin areas of northern La Paz Department, and the lowland departments of Beni, Pando, Santa Cruz, and Tarija (including the Gran Chaco region in the southeast of the country). Large numbers of Andean peoples have also migrated to form Quechua, Aymara, and intercultural communities in the lowlands.

- Andean ethnicities
  - Aymara people. They live on the high plateau of the departments of La Paz, Oruro and Potosí, as well as some small regions near the tropical flatlands.
  - Quechua people. They mostly inhabit the valleys in Cochabamba and Chuquisaca. They also inhabit some mountain regions in Potosí and Oruro. They divide themselves into different Quechua nations, as the Tarabucos, Ucumaris, Chalchas, Chaquies, Yralipes, Tirinas, among others.
  - Uru people
- Ethnicities of the Eastern Lowlands
  - Guaraníes: made up of Guarayos, Pausernas, Sirionós, Chiriguanos, Wichí, Chulipis, Taipetes, Tobas, and Yuquis.
  - Tacanas: made up of Lecos, Chimanes, Araonas, and Maropas.
  - Panos: made up of Chacobos, Caripunas, Sinabos, Capuibos, and Guacanaguas.
  - Aruacos: made up of Apolistas, Baures, Moxos, Chané, Movimas, Cayabayas, Carabecas, and Paiconecas (Paucanacas).
  - Chapacuras: made up of Itenez (More), Chapacuras, Sansinonianos, Canichanas, Itonamas, Yuracares, Guatoses, and Chiquitanos.
  - Botocudos: made up of Bororos and Otuquis.
  - Zamucos: made up of Ayoreos.
Ethnicity, 2024 census

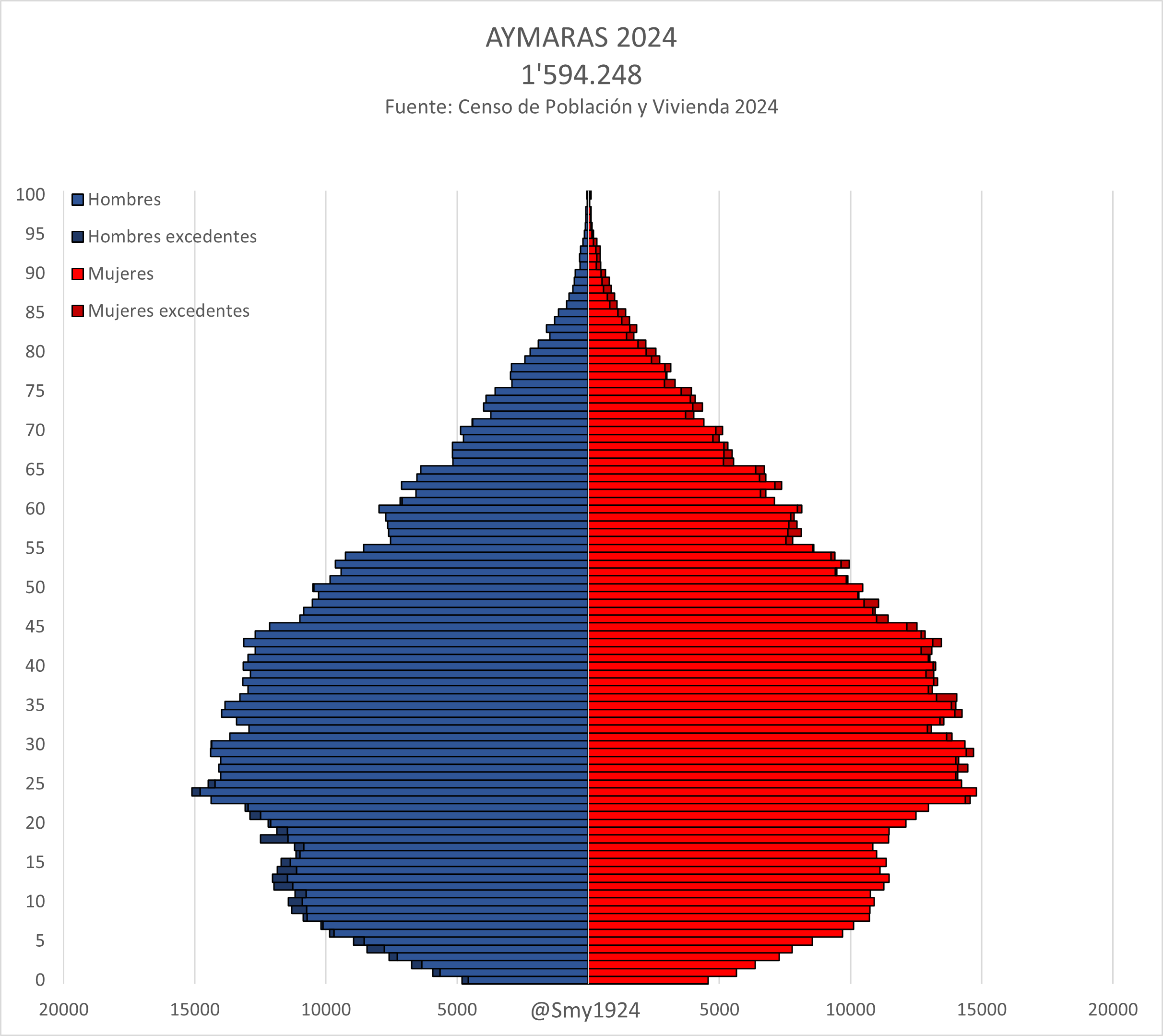
Aymaras.

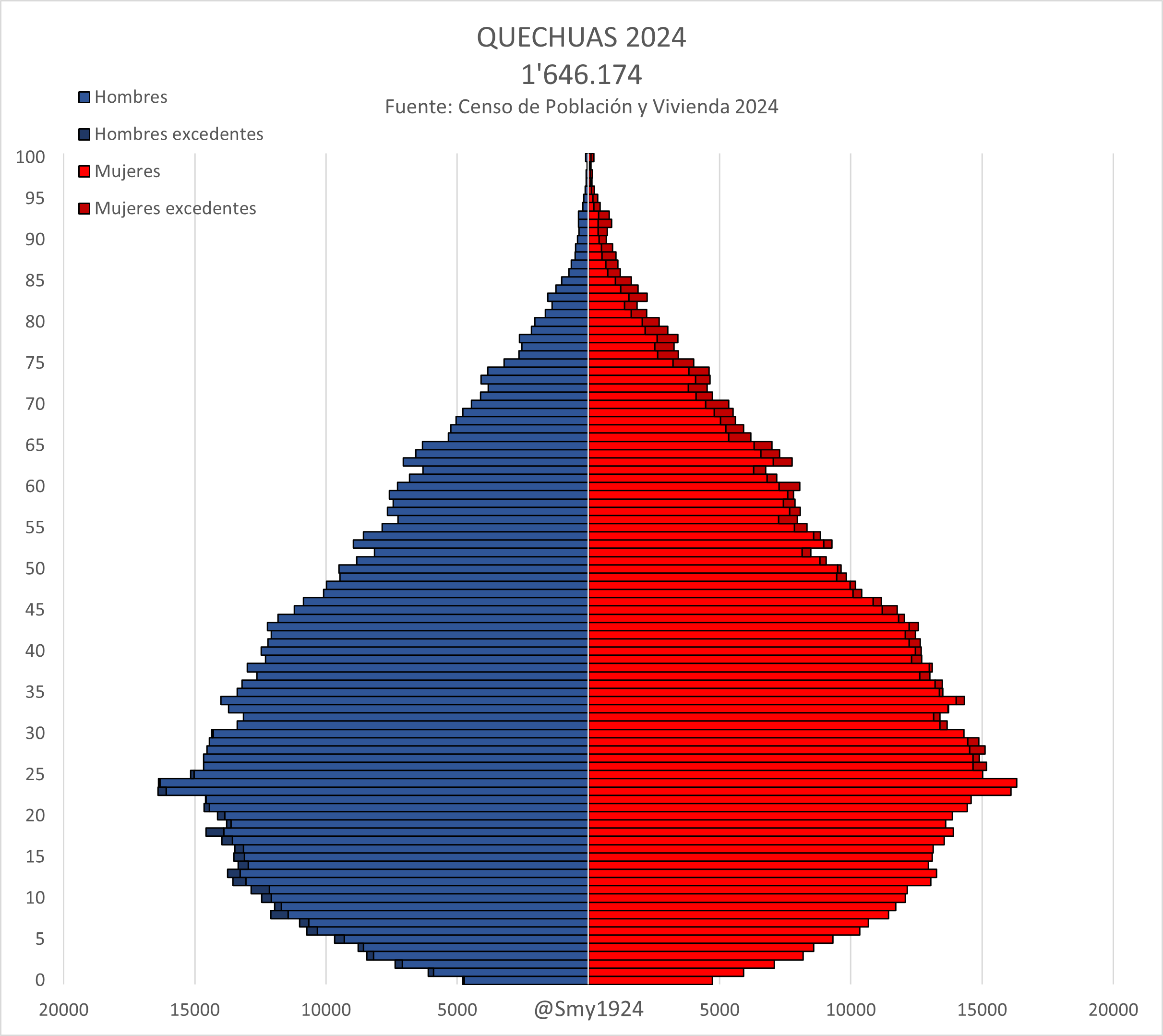
Quechuas.

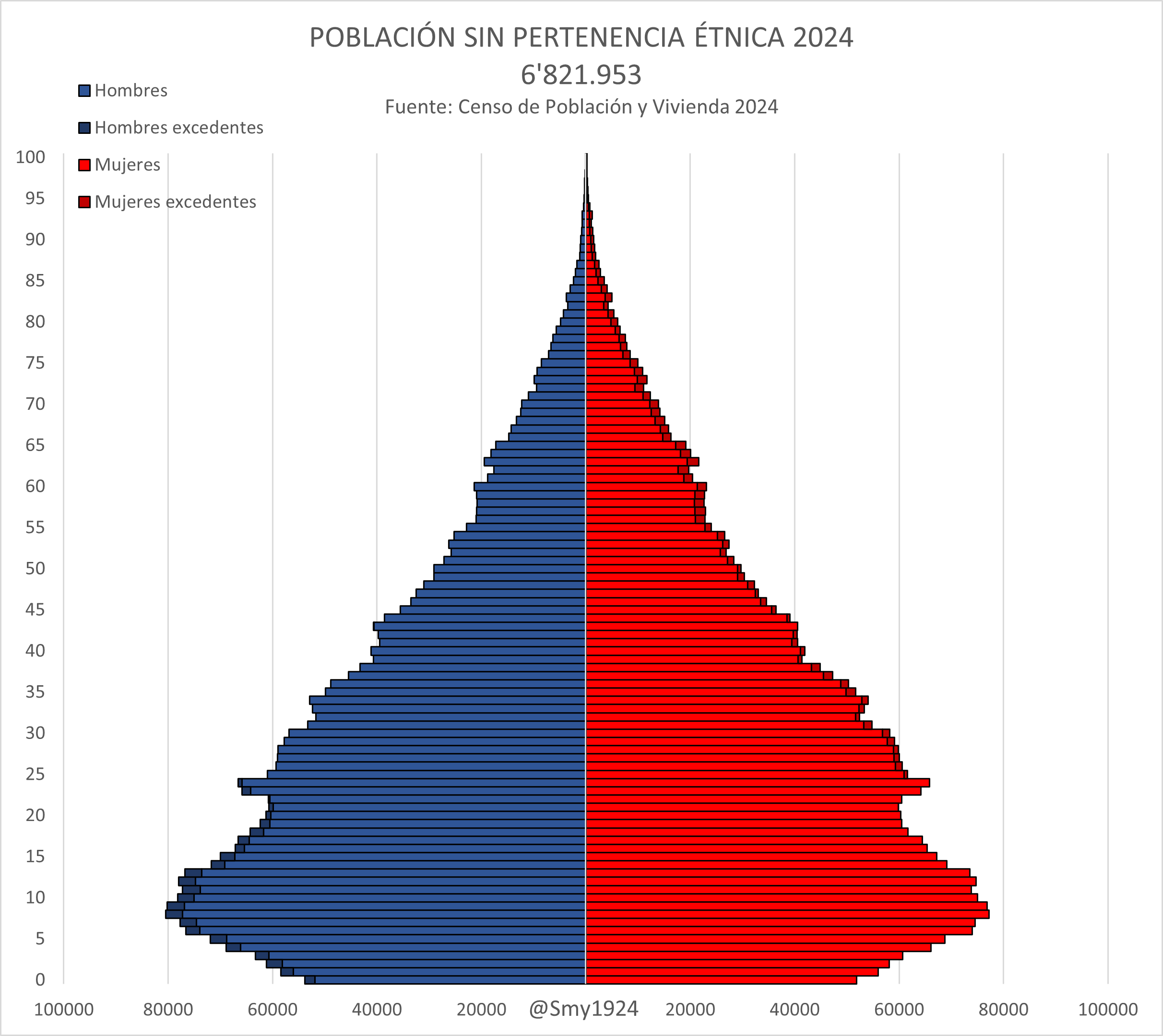
Without ethnicity.

== Languages ==
The official languages of Bolivia are Spanish (60.7%), Quechua (21.2%), Aymara (14.6), and Guaraní (0.6%), plus another 33 native languages. Originally only Spanish, Aymara, and Quechua were the official languages until the 2009 Constitution was passed. According to the 2001 census, 60.7% of the population over six years old are able to speak Spanish and/or speaks it as a native language.

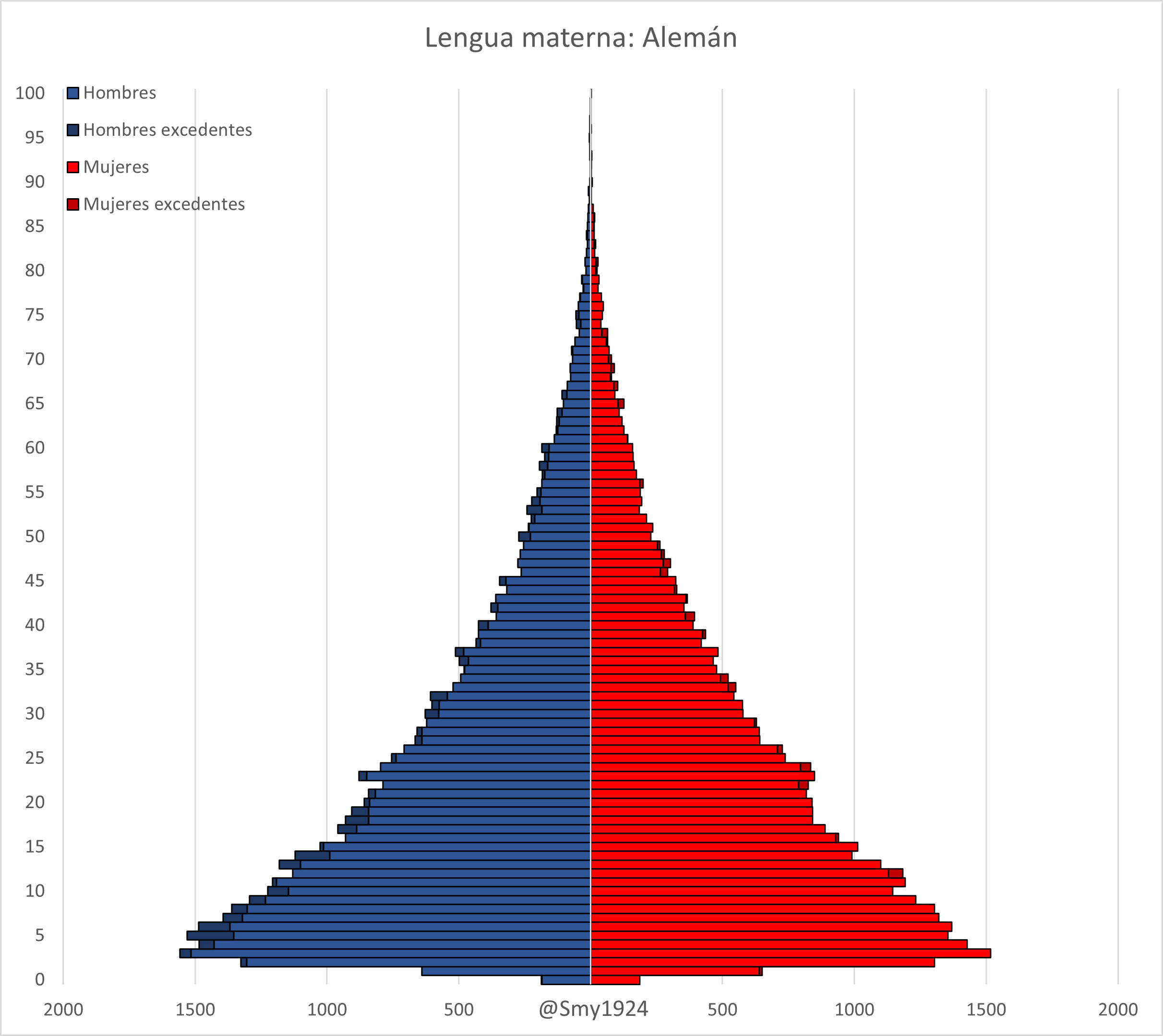
German as mother lenguage; estimated TFR: 5.31. Completed cohort fertility rate for women aged 49: 6.07

== Religion ==
Religion in Bolivia
Religion	percent
Roman Catholicism	76.8%
Evangelicalism and Pentecostalism	8.1%
Protestantism	7.9%
Other	1.7%
None	5.5%

In a 2012 Gallup poll, 87% answered affirmatively when asked "Is religion important in your daily life?" Christianity is the largest religion in Bolivia, with Roman Catholicism being the largest denomination.
