= Deutsche Schule Santa Cruz =

German international school in Santa Cruz de la Sierra, Bolivia

Deutsche Schule Santa Cruz Spanish: Colegio Alemán Santa Cruz

Location
- Santa Cruz de la Sierra; Bolivia

Information
- School type: International School
- Language: German

Deutsche Schule Santa Cruz (Spanish: Colegio Alemán Santa Cruz) is a German international school in Santa Cruz de la Sierra, Bolivia.

It serves levels Kindergarten through the sixth year of secondary school.

== See also ==
- Ethnic Germans in Bolivia
