= Presencia =

Defunct newspaper in Bolivia

- Presencia print edition on 10 October 1982
- Type: Daily newspaper
- Format: Broadsheet
- Owner: Episcopal Conference of Bolivia
- Founder: Huáscar Cajías
- Publisher: Editorial Lux
- Founded: 28 March 1952; 74 years ago
- Ceased publication: 2 June 2001
- Language: Spanish
- City: La Paz
- Circulation: 200,000 (as of 1950s)
- Free online archives: Internet Archive

Presencia (lit. 'Presence') was a daily newspaper published in La Paz, Bolivia, from 1952 to 2001. The paper had the largest print circulation in the country and was considered a newspaper of record, being the only publication that did not reflect partisan interests. Founded on 28 March 1952 by the Episcopal Conference of Bolivia, it often served as an outlet for the Catholic Church in Bolivia.

== History ==
It was a conservative newspaper founded by the Catholic Church, days before the triumph of the revolution of April 9, 1952, as a "cultural and informative weekly".

Since its founding, for 25 years it was directed by the lawyer and journalist Huáscar Cajías Kauffmann. It was known for having no affiliation to any political party, even though it was known for giving a voice to the church.

On July 9, 1968, the newspaper Presencia published El Diario del Che en Bolivia for the first time, eight months after the capture of Che Guevara. At the time, the newspaper had 200,000 copies in circulation.

It was subject to intervention on several occasions by military governments in the 1980s. At the end of December 1980, military personnel had occupied its office, under the grounds that the newspaper was "offending the dignity of the Bolivian woman". As of 1989, Presencia was the largest and most circulated newspaper in Bolivia, with 90,000 copies available. In 1984, it was part of a conflict between the Confederation of Workers' Unions (COB) and the Confederation of Entrepreneurs of Bolivia (CEPB) as it took the newspaper three months to issue an independent stance on the situation. Since a democratic government was elected in October 1982, the newspaper supported freedom of speech and the press.

On June 2, 2001, the Bolivian Episcopal Conference, owner of the newspaper, announced the closure after 49 years of work; its last issue said that it was going to be suspended for a while, as the publication had been suffering losses. A book chronicling its history was published in 2019. Editions from 1964 to 1965 were digitized in 2020.
