= Roberto Aguilar =

Bolivian economist

Roberto Ivan Aguilar Gómez
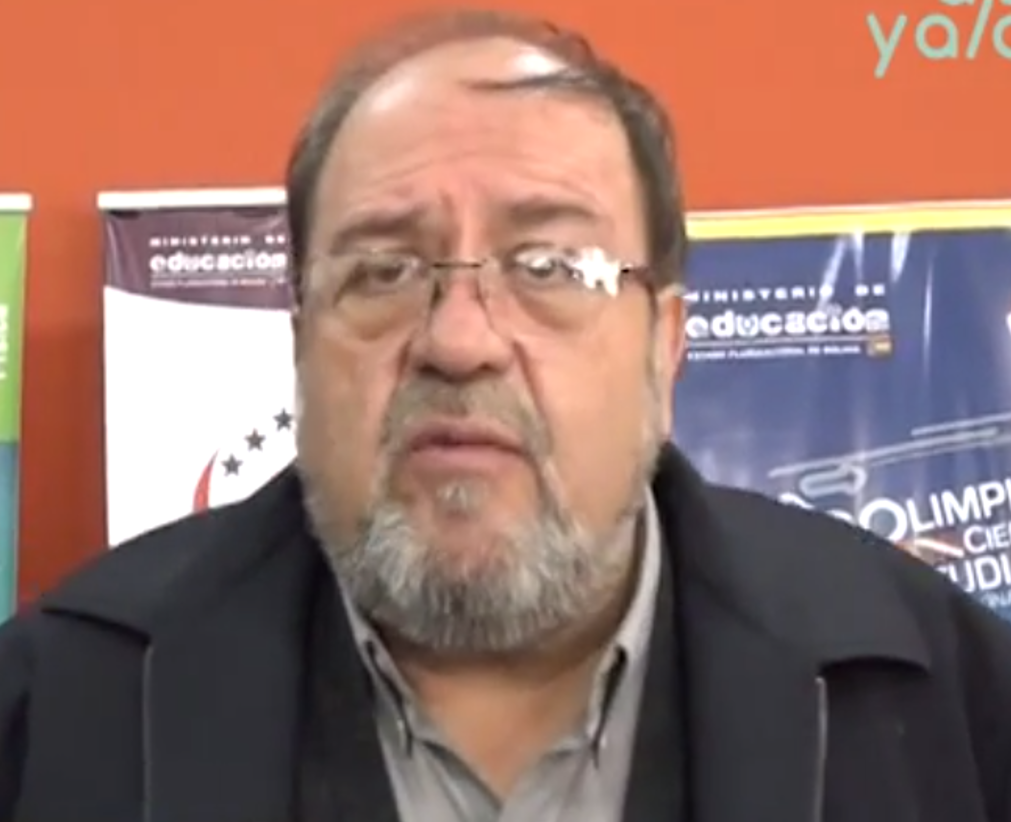

Minister of Education
- In office 7 November 2008 – 10 November 2019
- President: Evo Morales
- Preceded by: Magdalena Cajías
- Succeeded by: Virginia Patty Torres

Vice-President of the Constituent Assembly
- In office 2006–2007

Member of the Constituent Assembly
- In office 2006–2007
- Constituency: La Paz (plurinominal seat)

Personal details
- Born: 19 May 1958 (age 68) La Paz, La Paz, Bolivia
- Party: MAS-IPSP
- Occupation: Economist, University administrator

Roberto Ivan Aguilar Gómez (born 19 May 1958 in La Paz, Bolivia) is a Bolivian economist, former university official, politician, and former Minister of Education from 2008 until 2019, when Evo Morales resigned. Aguilar served as docent, general secretary, and rector in the Universidad Mayor de San Andres in La Paz. In 2006, he was elected as a plurinominal member of the Bolivian Constituent Assembly for the Movement for Socialism and served as its vice president. In November 2008, he was appointed by Evo Morales as Minister of Education, succeeding Magdalena Cajías.
