= Lupe Cajías =

Bolivian Journalist

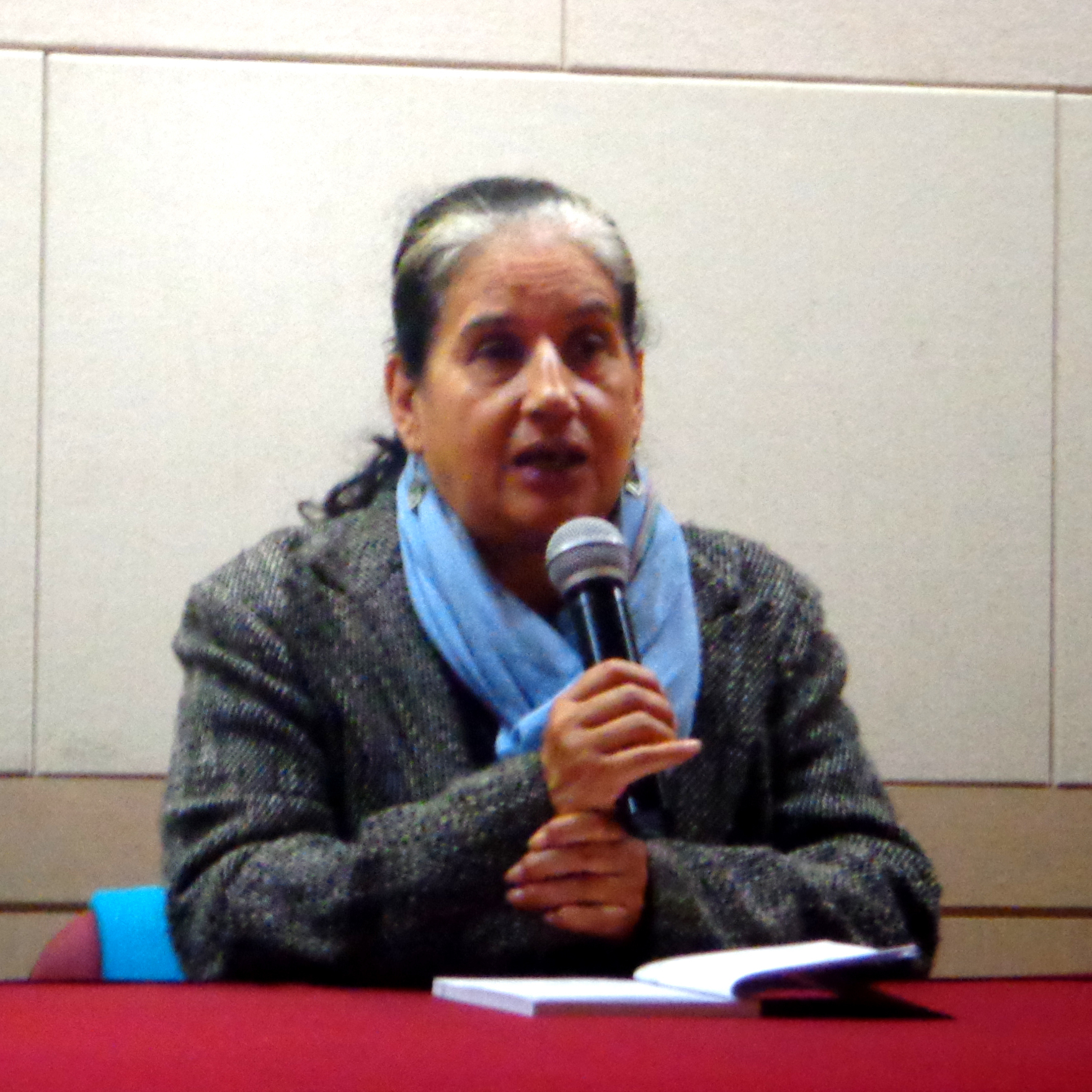
- Lupe Cajías (2011)
- Born: Lupe Cajías de la Vega; 1955 (age 70–71); La Paz, Bolivia
- Education: Pontifical Xavierian University
- Occupations: Journalist, historian, writer
- Awards: Erich Guttentag Award (1996)

Lupe Cajías de la Vega (born 1955) is a Bolivian journalist, historian, and writer. Cajías has focused her career on journalism, though she is also the author of books such as Historia de una Leyenda, vida y palabra de Juan Lechín Oquendo (1988) and Valentina. Historia de una rebeldía. Likewise, her career has been recognized with the UNICEF national award in 1986, as well as the Erich Guttentag Award for the novel Valentina. Historia de una rebeldía in 1996 (this award was replaced by the National Novel Award two years later).

== Biography ==
Lupe Cajías was born in the city of La Paz, Bolivia in 1955. She studied journalism, with a focus in the area of research, at the Pontifical Xavierian University in Bogotá, from which she graduated with honors. She also studied history at the Higher University of San Andrés. She witnessed the return of democracy to Bolivia on 10 October 1982, having given birth to her first child a few days before.

In her role as a journalist, Cajías was also editor of El Tiempo in Bogotá, and later became a columnist for the Bolivian newspapers Los Tiempos and Página Siete. Similarly, she served as editor-in-chief of the weekly Aquí. Also, Cajías was elected as president of the Association of Journalists of La Paz in 2014. During this period she carried out a series of actions in favor of freedom of expression, which, according to the APLP, was limited by the actions of the government of Evo Morales. Her term ended in 2016, when Nelson Martínez won new elections within the union.

Cajías also ventured into the field of politics when she was responsible for the anti-corruption department from 2003 to 2005, during the presidency of Carlos Mesa. She was a founding member of the Huáscar Cajías Cultural Foundation.

Continuing with her professional career, Cajías was a teacher at the Higher University of San Andrés, where she had been a student during her history studies. In the same capacity, she teaches at the Bolivian Catholic University.

== Works ==
- Valentina. Historia de una rebeldía (1966) Novel. Erich Guttentag Award.
- El Presente es de lucha, el futuro es nuestro (1983) Essay
- Historia de una leyenda, vida y palabra de Juan Lechín Oquendo (1988) Biography
- Biografía de Flavio Machicado Viscarra (1994) Biography
- Los caminos de Nuevos Horizontes (2007) Essay
- Morir en mi cumpleaños (2011) Fictionalized biography of Óscar Únzaga
- Nueva crónica y buen gobierno (2012) Chronicle, in conjunction with other authors
