= Luciano Durán Böger =

Bolivian poet, writer and politician (1904–1996)

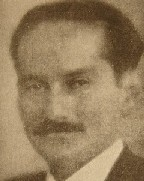
- Born: November 12, 1904; Beni, Bolivia
- Died: October 18, 1996 (aged 91); La Paz, Bolivia
- Occupations: Poet, novelist

Luciano Durán Böger (November 12, 1904 – October 18, 1996) was a Bolivian poet, writer and politician. Son of Luciano Duran Pérez and Aurora Böger Rivero, was born in 1904 in Santa Ana, capital of the Yacuma province of the Department of Beni in Bolivia, and died in 1996 in the city of La Paz.

Poet and novelist, Durán Böger was also a writer of different literary supplements of Bolivian newspapers. His artistic, political and journalistic work allowed him to give lectures in different countries such as Ecuador, Peru, Chile and Argentina. Durán Böger was also a self-taught painter. He exhibited his works in La Paz and Potosí (1968 and 1980).

== Politics and the artist ==
Duran Böger, was representative of the students in the Major University of San Andrés in La Paz and leader of the University Youth; founder and Secretary of Organization of the first Trade Union Confederation of Bolivian Workers (Spanish: Confederación Sindical de Trabajadores de Bolivia, CSTB) and the Workers' Party of Bolivia (Spanish: Partido Obrero, PO) in 1937; founder and militant of the Communist Party of Bolivia and APRA in the Peru. He was also the founder of the Moxos Cultural Centre in 1938.

=== Imprisonment and exile ===
Durán Böger was imprisoned by the Government of Bolivia between 1932 and 1935 due as a university leader, objected publicly to the Chaco War. His position against the war cost him also the expulsion of the University Council and the Bolivian University system.

Due to his political ideology, he was exiled from Bolivia and settled in Peru, Chile, Switzerland, France and Spain.

=== The poem of the handkerchief of the National Stadium ===
In 1973, staying in Chile, Durán Böger was arrested as a political prisoner after the coup that overthrew the government of Salvador Allende, being held in the Nro Camerin. 3 at the national stadium of Chile in the city of Santiago of Chile, where on 9 October 1973, on the occasion of the transfer of detainees Bolivians of the camerin, requested a paper to write a poem of farewell, there being no paper, asked Santiago Cavieres, writer, poet and lawyer Chilean, also held, that will reach you a panuelo.

In 1973, while in Chile, Böger Duran was arrested as a political prisoner after the coup that overthrew the government of Salvador Allende, being held at the National Stadium of Chile in Santiago, where the October 9, 1973, on the occasion of the transfer of detainees Bolivians, asked for a paper to write a farewell poem, there being no paper, asked Santiago Cavieres, writer, poet and Chilean lawyer also detained, he reach his handkerchief in which Duran Boger wrote:

Good bye
We're already going
Will we return
to the starting point
of a 9/11? No!
We're already going
Chilean brothers
No one
sow happiness
on the warm blood
of the streets of Santiago
Now we go
from here
from this
collective closure;within
our Bolivian hearts
two hands
go hand in hand
and hunger
made pain opened a deep ditch;
in our breasts brothers
are given
a goodbye hug,
Chilean and Bolivian

— Luciano Durán Böger, Adios

The handkerchief was signed by prisoners of the camerin and preserved by Santiago Cavieres, who gave it to his wife before being transferred to detention field of Chacabuco. Several years later he donated it to the Museum of memory and Humans Rights, where is listed with the registration number 00000109000001000001 under the following description:

Handkerchief in which Luciano Durán, Bolivian wrote a poem, around which the 80 prisoners of the dressing room number three of the National Stadium signed

Documentary filmmaker Javier Bertin Mardel produced the documentary The handkerchief of the National Stadium in which through the testimony of Santiago Cavieres, tells the story of the farewell poem written by Duran Boger in a handkerchief, and how Chilean and Bolivian, detained at the National Stadium of Chile, during the dictatorship of Augusto Pinochet, organized all kinds of activities to stay mentally healthy and survive the closure and torture based on mutual solidarity. The documentary is also part of the collection of the Museum of Memory and Human Rights in Santiago under registration number 00000095000001000001.

== Work ==
Between 1960 and 1972, Durán Böger published six literary works.

He is a prominent Bolivian authors of the 20th century and one of the most representative writers of the Bolivian East, his work En las Tierras de Enín (In the Land of Enin) is regarded among the best Bolivian novels.

Durán Boger was awarded with several awards, including: the 'Golden violet' in the floral games of Santa Cruz (1960).

In Radiografía Íntima del Poeta (Intimate X-ray of the poet), Duran Boger wrote: "the poet is a living paradox in a rock crystal. In his work, nothing remains hidden. Feelings, emotions, desires, wishes, hopes, disappointments, loves and desires, everything from the most trivial to the transcendent, the poets says and refuses his own being".

In his poem My origin and destiny, Luciano Durán Böger described himself in the following way:

I am the last vertical
descendant
of tomatoes,
of the mara and the almond
with deep roots,
cherished by dawn.
The territory of my blood
hugged the mother
of the torrents
and the vessels of my dreams
were flooded.
Through my eyes entered
all hydrographies
displacing the preferred place
of my sufferings. And with the steel of the symbols
tore anguish
with poems fiber

— Luciano Durán Böger, My origin and destiny

== List of works ==
- Sequía (Drought), novel, 1960
- Geografía de la Sangre (Geography of blood), poetry, 1963
- Poetas del Beni (Poets of Beni), essay, 1963
- Inundación: Novela para un Continente en Lucha (Flood: Novel for a continent in fight), novel, 1965
- En las Tierras de Enin (In the land of Enin ), novel, 1967
- Sangre de Esmeralda (Blood of Emerald), novel, 1972
