= Deutsche Schule La Paz =

German international school in La Paz, Bolivia

Coordinates: 16.5291°S 68.0670°W

Deutsche Schule La Paz Spanish: Colegio Alemán "Mariscal Braun"

Location
- La Paz; Bolivia

Information
- School type: International School
- Established: 1923; 102 years ago
- Grades: K-12
- Language: German

Deutsche Schule La Paz (Spanish: Colegio Alemán "Mariscal Braun") is a German international school in La Paz, Bolivia. The school serves Kindergarten through grade 12 (Sekundarstufe/Secundaria 12).

The school was founded on 10 May 1923.

== See also ==
- Ethnic Germans in Bolivia
