= Noel Kempff Mercado =

Bolivian scientist

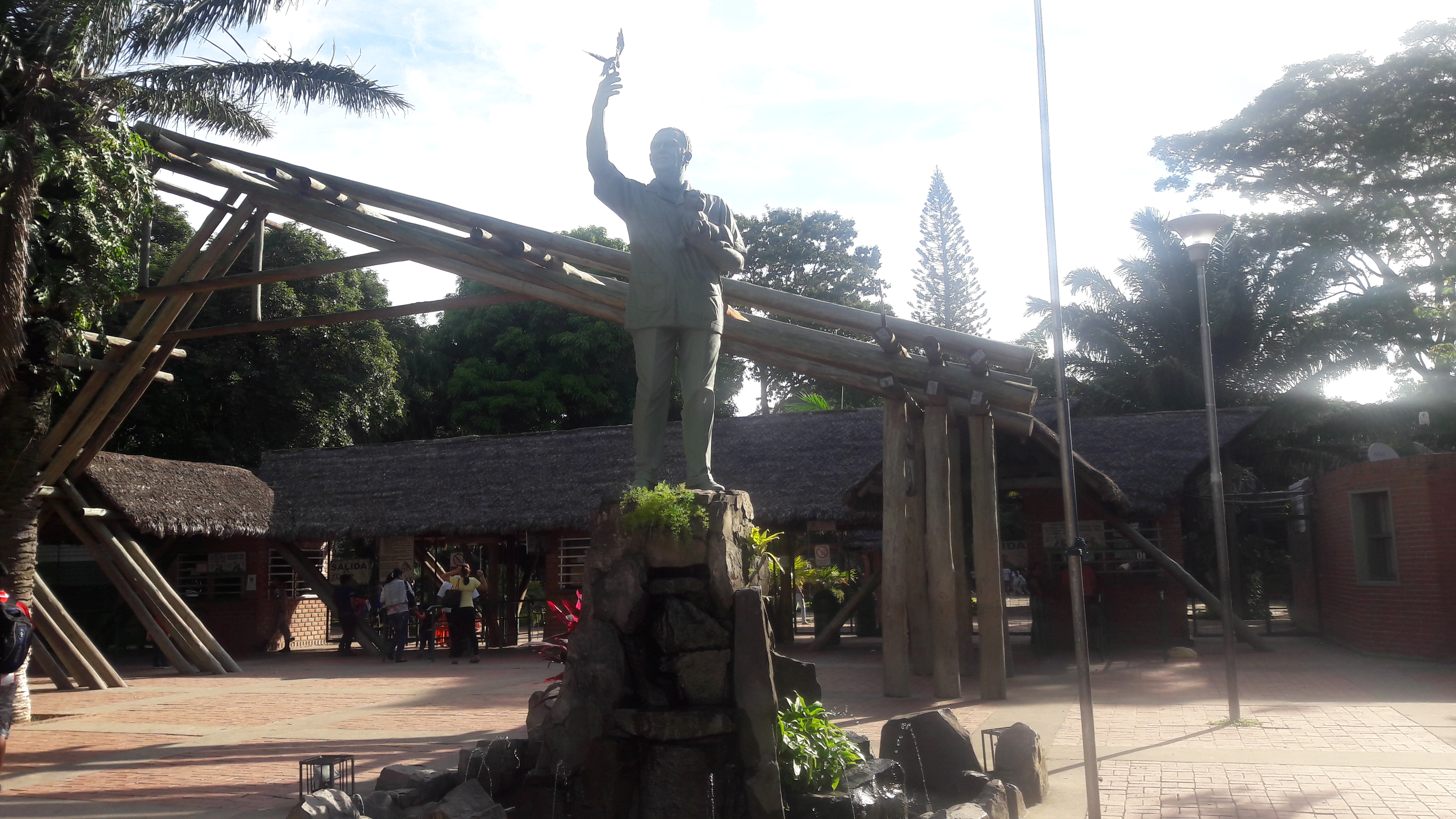
- Noel Kempff Mercado Monument, in Santa Cruz, Bolivia.
- Born: February 27, 1924; Santa Cruz de la Sierra, Bolivia
- Died: September 5, 1986 (aged 62); Serranía de Caparuch, Bolivia
- Scientific career
- Fields: Biologist

Noel Kempff Mercado (February 27, 1924 in Santa Cruz de la Sierra, Bolivia – September 5, 1986 in the Serranía de Caparuch, Bolivia) was a Bolivian biologist and environmentalist.

Kempff Mercado studied at the University of Santa Cruz where he received his B.Sc. in 1946. During a field campaign in the Huanchaca National Park in 1986 he and several other scientists discovered a cocaine factory in the Bolivian forest. Kempff Mercado and most of the scientists were killed by the criminals. The Huanchaca National Park was renamed in 1988 as Noel Kempff Mercado National Park.
