= Jaime Mirtenbaum Zenamon =

Jaime Mirtenbaum Zenamon (born 1953) is a classical guitarist and composer. He was born in La Paz, Bolivia, and studied guitar and composition in Israel, Spain and Portugal as well as in South America. He taught at the Berlin Academy of Music from 1980 to 1992. He now lives in Curitiba, Brazil.

In addition to advanced concert repertoire, he has written a number of pieces for beginning and intermediate guitar students, some of which have been included in collections of student repertoire.

== Articles ==
- Duo Borgomanero-Zenamon divulga roteiro de concertos com entrada livre October 2006, by Desiderio Peron (INSIEME) (in Portuguese)
- Jaime Zenamon e Daise Sartori apresentam Conserto Natalino December 2005 (Campo Mourão) (in Portuguese)
