= Achim von Kries =

- Military career
- Allegiance: Germany
- Conflicts: Chaco War

Achim von Kries was a German military officer who served in the 1932–1935 Chaco War between Paraguay and Bolivia, commanding Bolivian armored fighting vehicles. He was wounded in action during the second battle of Nanawa. Von Kries later founded the Landesgruppe-Bolivie, the Bolivia branch of the German Nazi Party's Auslands-Organisation.
