= Rodrigo Paz =

President of Bolivia since 2025

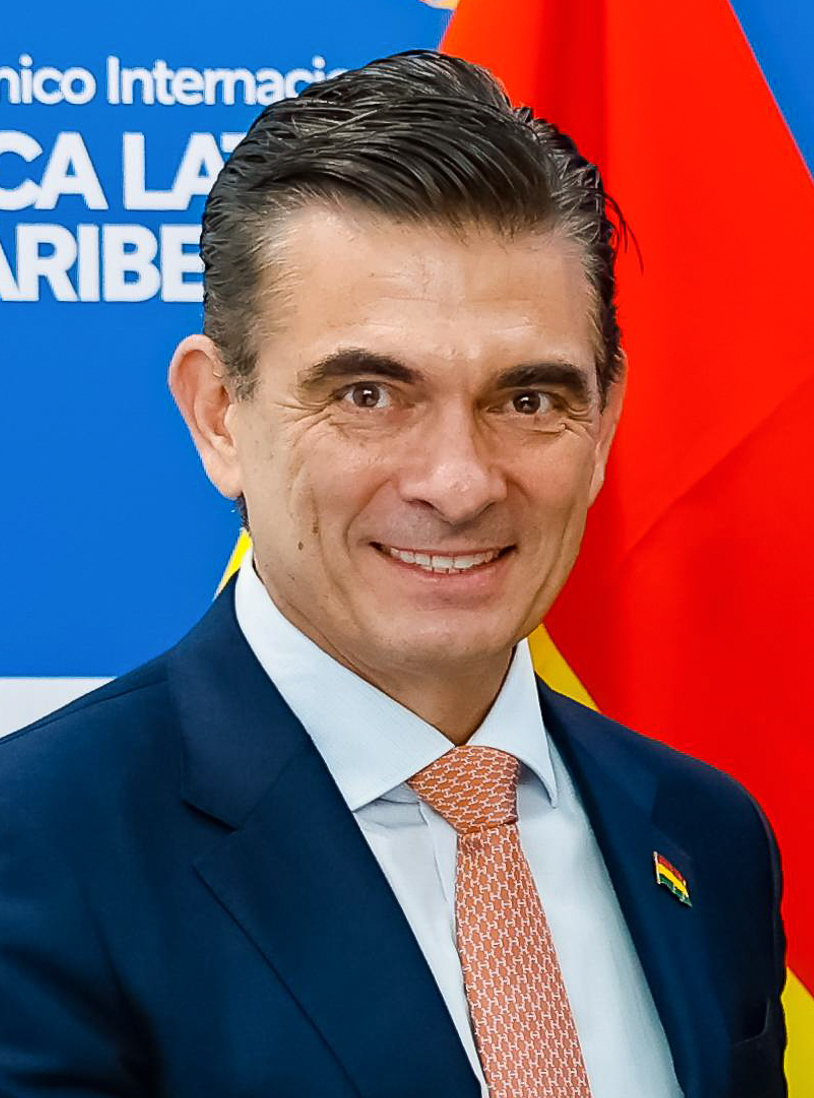
- Paz in 2026

68th President of Bolivia
- Incumbent
- Assumed office 8 November 2025
- Vice President: Edmand Lara
- Preceded by: Luis Arce

Senator for Tarija
- In office 3 November 2020 – 8 November 2025

Mayor of Tarija
- In office 30 May 2015 – 24 October 2020
- Preceded by: Oscar Montes
- Succeeded by: Alfonso Lema

President of the Tarija Municipal Council
- In office 30 May 2010 – 30 May 2015
- Preceded by: Roberto Ávila Castellanos
- Succeeded by: Alfonso Lema

Member of the Chamber of Deputies from Tarija
- In office 6 August 2002 – 22 January 2010
- Preceded by: Pedro Sagredo
- Succeeded by: Roy Cornejo Raña
- Constituency: Circumscription 49 (2002–2006); Circumscription 46 (2006–2010)

Personal details
- Born: Rodrigo Paz Pereira; 22 September 1967 (age 59) Santiago de Compostela, Spain
- Citizenship: Bolivia • Spain
- Party: PDC (2019; 2025) (Note: As presidential candidate.)
- Other political affiliations: MIR–FRI (2002–2005); PODEMOS (2005–2008); CC (2020–2025); PATRIA (since 2025)
- Spouse: Maria Elena Urquidi
- Children: 4
- Parent: Jaime Paz Zamora (father)
- Relatives: Víctor Paz Estenssoro (great-uncle); Xosé Manuel Beiras (uncle-in-law)
- Education: San Ignacio School; American University (BIGS, MPM)

Rodrigo Paz Pereira (Spanish pronunciation: [roˈðɾiɣo ˈpas peˈɾejɾa]; born 22 September 1967) is a Bolivian politician and diplomat who has served as the 68th president of Bolivia since 2025. The eldest son of former president Jaime Paz Zamora and great-nephew of president Víctor Paz Estenssoro, he served as a senator for Tarija from 2020 to 2025. He also previously served as mayor of Tarija from 2015 to 2020 and as a member of the Chamber of Deputies from 2002 to 2010, representing his father's Revolutionary Left Movement (MIR).

Born in Spain, Paz graduated from American University in Washington, D.C., and joined the government of Hugo Banzer in various diplomatic positions. He was first elected to the Chamber of Deputies in the 2002 as part of the MIR, serving until 2010. Following the dissolution of MIR, Paz entered the local field of his family's political stronghold, Tarija, serving as President of the Municipal Council from 2010 to 2015 and as Mayor of Tarija from 2015 to 2020. In 2020, he was elected as senator for Tarija as part of the Civic Community party.

In the 2025 general election, Paz ran as the candidate for president of the Christian Democratic Party, with former police officer Edmand Lara as his running mate. Initially third in polls behind businessman Samuel Doria Medina and former president Jorge Quiroga, Paz placed first in the election's first round in an upset that marked the end of MAS's 20-year dominance in the country. Paz went on to defeat Quiroga in a second round run-off, the first time in the country's history that the mechanism had been used.

Paz's political positions have been described as centrist and populist, aligning with Quiroga on warmer relations with Israel and with the United States, the latter for economic aid and reduction in government spending while seeking to implement these to a more moderate degree. Upon Paz's victory, Quiroga and his Libre coalition have pledged "unconditional support" to Paz's government. Upon assuming office, Paz has pledged to resolve a socioeconomic crisis inherited from his predecessor Luis Arce by replenishing foreign currency reserves and ending shortages of gasoline and diesel.

== Early life and career ==
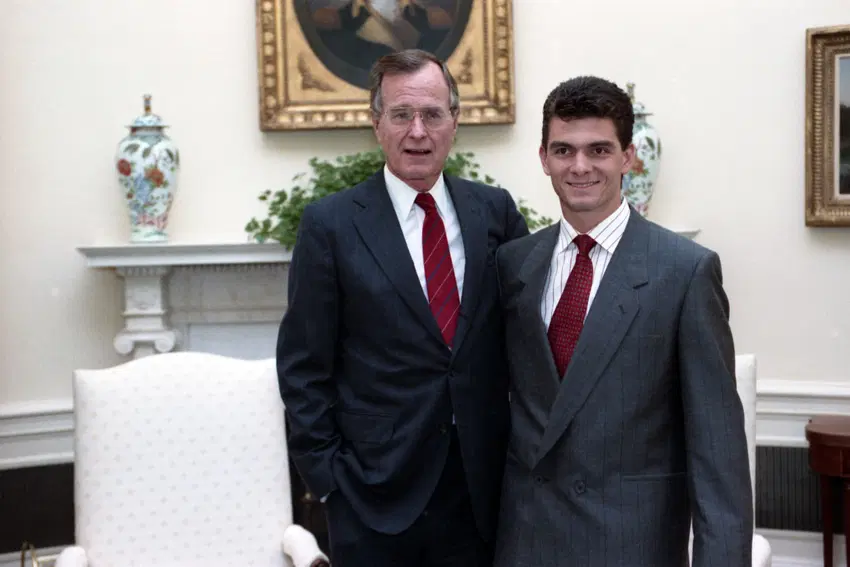
A young Paz with George H. W. Bush in May 1990.

Rodrigo Paz Pereira was born on 22 September 1967 in Santiago de Compostela, in Spain, the first-born son of Carmen Pereira Carballo, a native of Spain, and then-exiled Bolivian national Jaime Paz Zamora. Via his mother's side, he is the cousin of actress Camila Bossa, while his aunt Aurichu Pereira was married to politician Xosé Manuel Beiras until her death in 2023. Rodrigo Paz is related to José María Paz, an Argentine general during the Argentine War of Independence and the Argentine Civil Wars.

Paz spent his childhood and adolescence in political exile, a by-product of his father's political activity during the military dictatorships of the 1970s and early 1980s. He studied in numerous Jesuit schools in several countries, and when democracy was re-established in Bolivia, he attended the San Ignacio School in La Paz. Later, Paz studied at American University in Washington, D.C., United States, where he graduated with a bachelor's degree in international relations with a major in economics and a master's in political management. During the second presidency of Hugo Banzer—whose government was supported by the MIR—he worked as a commercial attaché at the Bolivian Embassy in Spain and served as chargé d'affaires to the World Trade Organization.

== Political career ==
Together with his brother, Jaime Paz Pereira, he was one of the so-called "political heirs" of the country, a group of younger statesmen whose political careers had been facilitated by their connections to the country's prominent party leaders. In the 2002 general elections, the MIR nominated Paz as its candidate for Tarija in circumscription 49 (Avilés-Méndez), a major stronghold of support for the party. Winning the seat with a comfortable majority, he was elected to represent the district for the 2002–2007 National Congress. Though the significant social conflicts of the time culminated in the collapse of the traditional party system, Paz's already-established political career survived. When the legislature's mandate was shortened by two years, he was presented by a diminished MIR as its candidate for Tarija in circumscription 46 (Cercado) for the 2005 general elections, in alliance with Social Democratic Power of Jorge Quiroga.

=== Mayor of Tarija (2015–2020) ===
By August 2006, the inability of the MIR to achieve the required 2% vote threshold in that year's constituent assembly elections led to the loss of its national registration. With that, Paz joined the ranks of United to Renew (UNIR), led by the ex-Mirista and Tarija mayor Óscar Montes. In the 2010 regional elections, he headed UNIR's list of councillors in Tarija in support of Montes's bid for a third mayoral term. From 2010 to 2015, he served under Montes as the president of the Tarija Municipal Council and was nominated to succeed Montes as UNIR's mayoral candidate in the 2015 regional elections. Paz swept the race, winning almost 60% of the city's votes.

At his mayoral inauguration on 30 May 2015, Montes highlighted that "it has been the MIR, then UNIR, who will govern Tarija for twenty consecutive years". However, Paz's own political project, focused on "rescuing the great Mirista root" of his father's party, ultimately resulted in the rupture of his alliance with Montes and his departure from UNIR just a year into his term, under accusations that he was trying to "destroy UNIR in order to structure the Revolutionary Left Movement". The culmination of Paz's political project came on 3 April 2019 with the establishment of the First the People (Primero la Gente; PG) civic group. With himself at the head, PG aimed at consolidating municipal and departmental sectors into a political alliance whose "ideology is the people".

After the 2019 political crisis, Paz's mayoral term was extended by an additional year. However, he cut it short by tendering his resignation on 20 October 2020 to take office in the Plurinational Legislative Assembly. After four days of debate, the Municipal Council voted to accept Paz's resignation and elected its president, Alfonso Lema, as his successor.

In February 2024, the Departmental Prosecutor's Office of Tarija formally charged Paz with alleged irregularities related to the 4 de Julio Bridge, a public works project awarded during his tenure as mayor. The bridge—now widely referred to as the "Million-Dollar Bridge" (Puente Millonario)—was contracted for Bs 73.2 million in 2018, during Paz's administration, and according to its contract, was set to be delivered within 900 calendar days, on 25 December 2020. However, several orders extended the deadline well into 2021, at which point fines began to be levied, before Paz's successor as mayor Jhonny Torres terminated the contract with the company Convisa on 12 August 2022 due to the company's failure to meet deadlines. The bridge was completed in November 2024 by Torres's administration, when Paz was no longer in office. The case was brought forward following a complaint by Torres and is being handled by the Fourth Anti-Corruption Court of Tarija.

=== Chamber of Senators ===
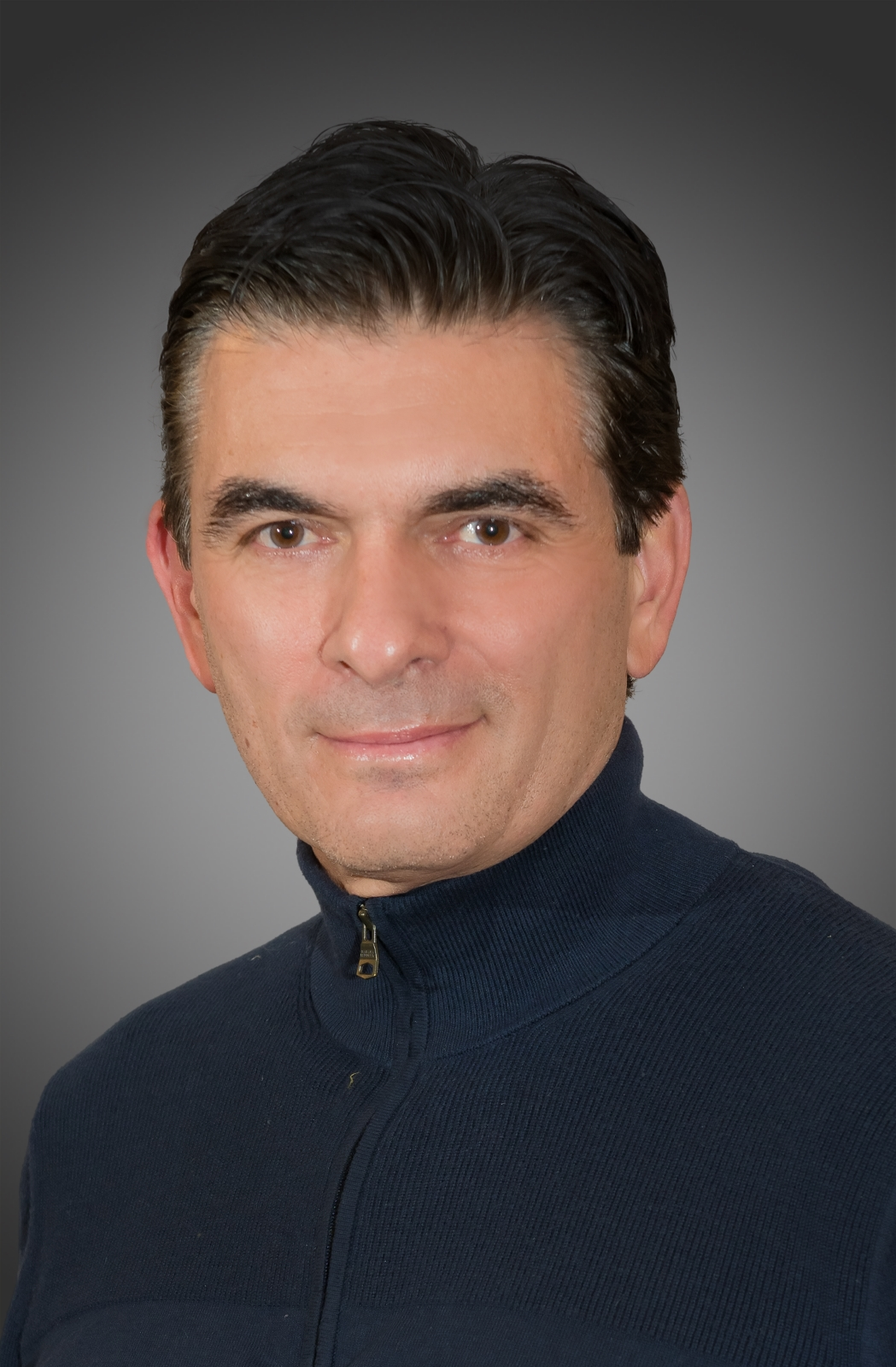
Paz's official portrait as senator in 2020

In the 2019 general elections, PG signed an alliance with the Christian Democratic Party (PDC), which presented Paz's father, ex-president Jaime Paz Zamora, as its presidential candidate. However, shortly thereafter, Paz Zamora withdrew his candidacy due to internal disagreements with the PDC, leading Paz to shift his support to Carlos Mesa of Civic Community (CC). On 3 February 2020, PG finalized an alliance with CC, presenting Paz as the coalition's candidate for first senator for Tarija.

During his tenure, Paz was a vocal proponent of census reform in light of the process scheduled for late 2022. In January of that year, Paz presented a bill to establish Departmental Institutes of Statistics (IDEs), aimed at generating departmental, municipal, and regional statistical information. If passed, the legislation would have decentralized the census process —overseen by the National Institute of Statistics (INE)— which Paz assured would make the 2022 census "a census of the people". Paz also criticized a lack of transparency regarding what preparations and activities were underway to carry out the census. On 7 February, the CC caucus delivered a petition to the Ministry of Development Planning requesting a report on planned activities. By early March, CC noted that it had not received a response so far. Failing the creation of IDEs due to a lack of time to establish such institutions, Paz also proposed the formation of inter-institutional monitoring committees made up of governorates, municipalities, universities, regional chambers, social organizations, and other relevant groups to guarantee transparency in the process.

He was assigned to the following commissions:

- Board of the Chamber of Senators (Second Vice President of the Senate; 4 November 2020 – 4 November 2021)
- Rural Indigenous Nations and Peoples, Cultures, and Interculturality Commission (President; 10 November 2021–present)

== Presidency (2025–present) ==
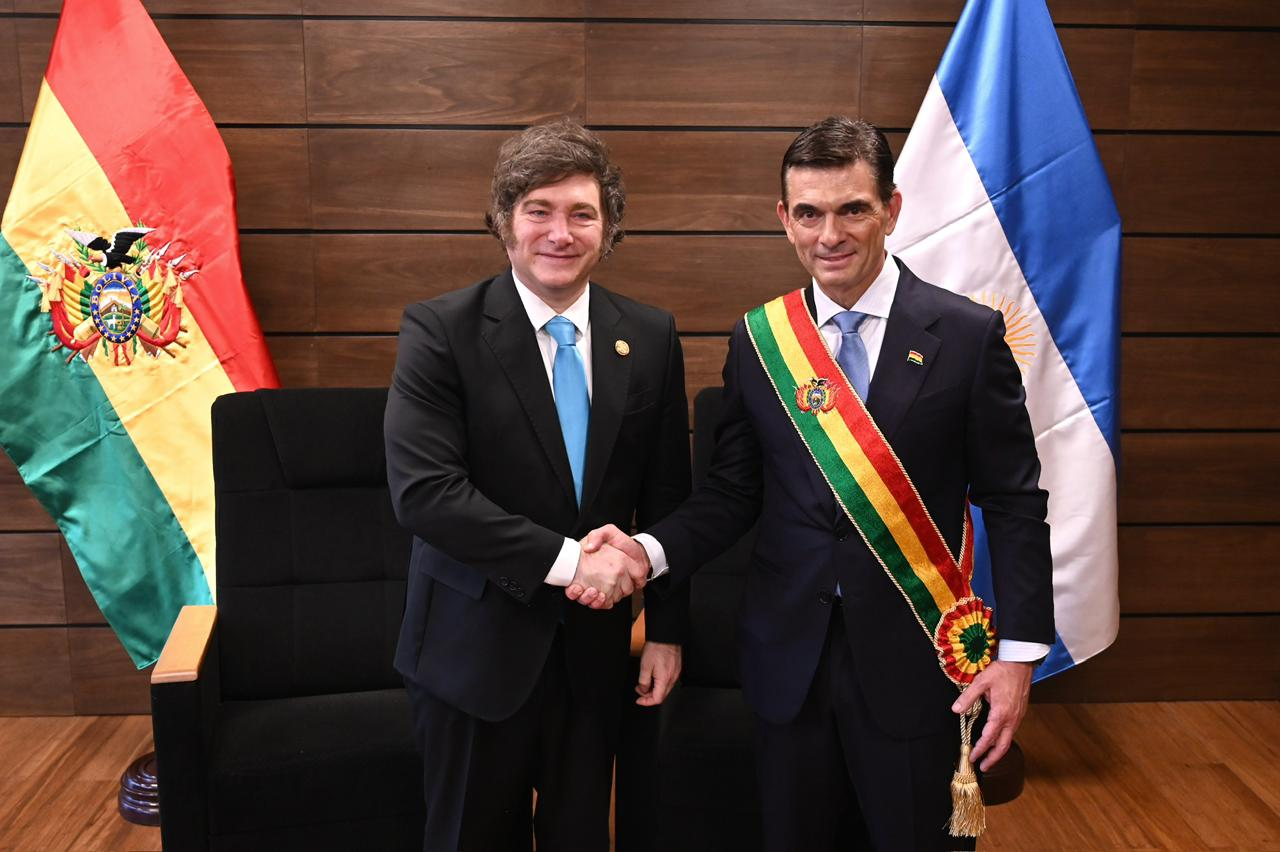
Argentine president Javier Milei with Paz on the latter's inauguration, 8 November 2025

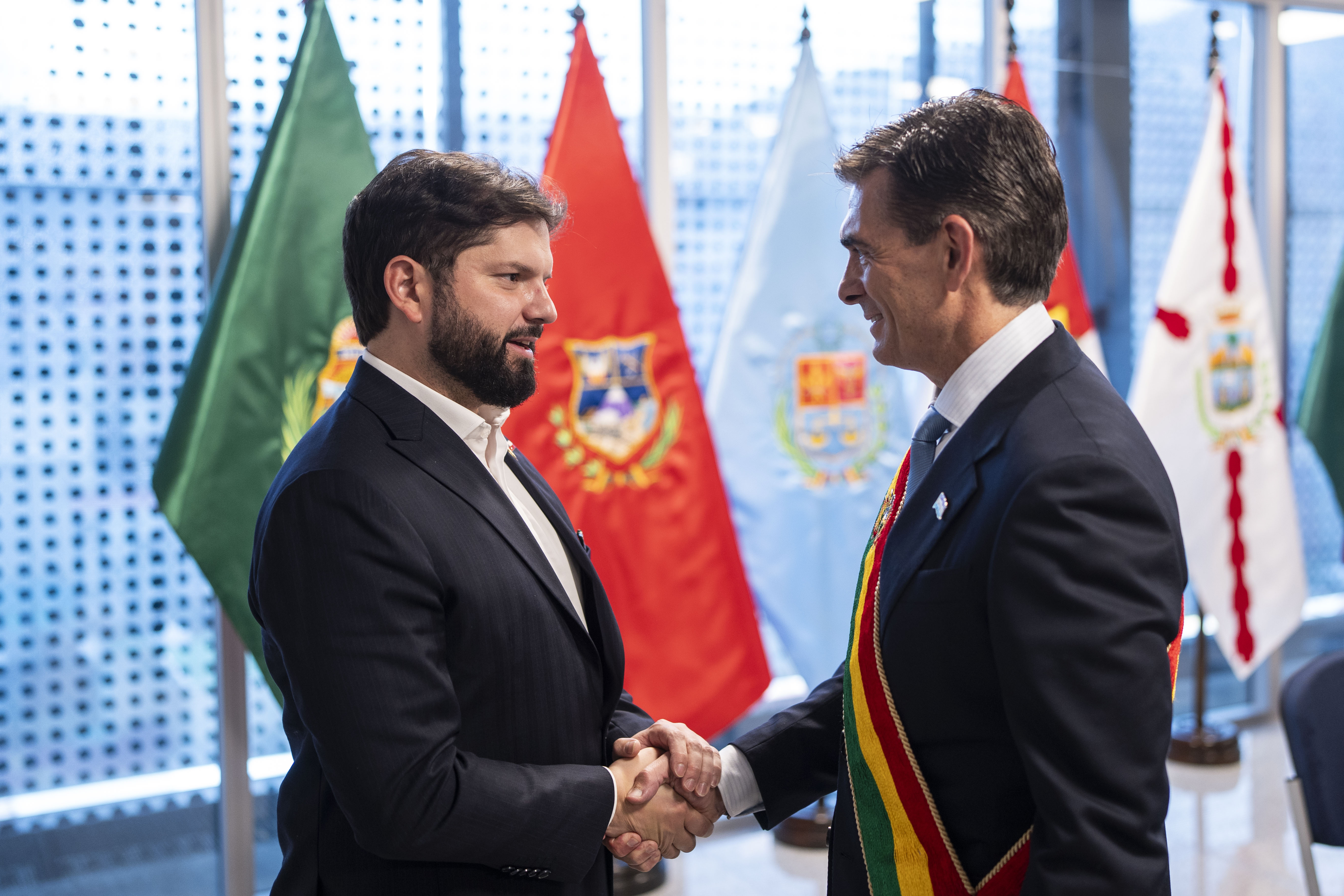
Paz with Chilean President Gabriel Boric in November 2025

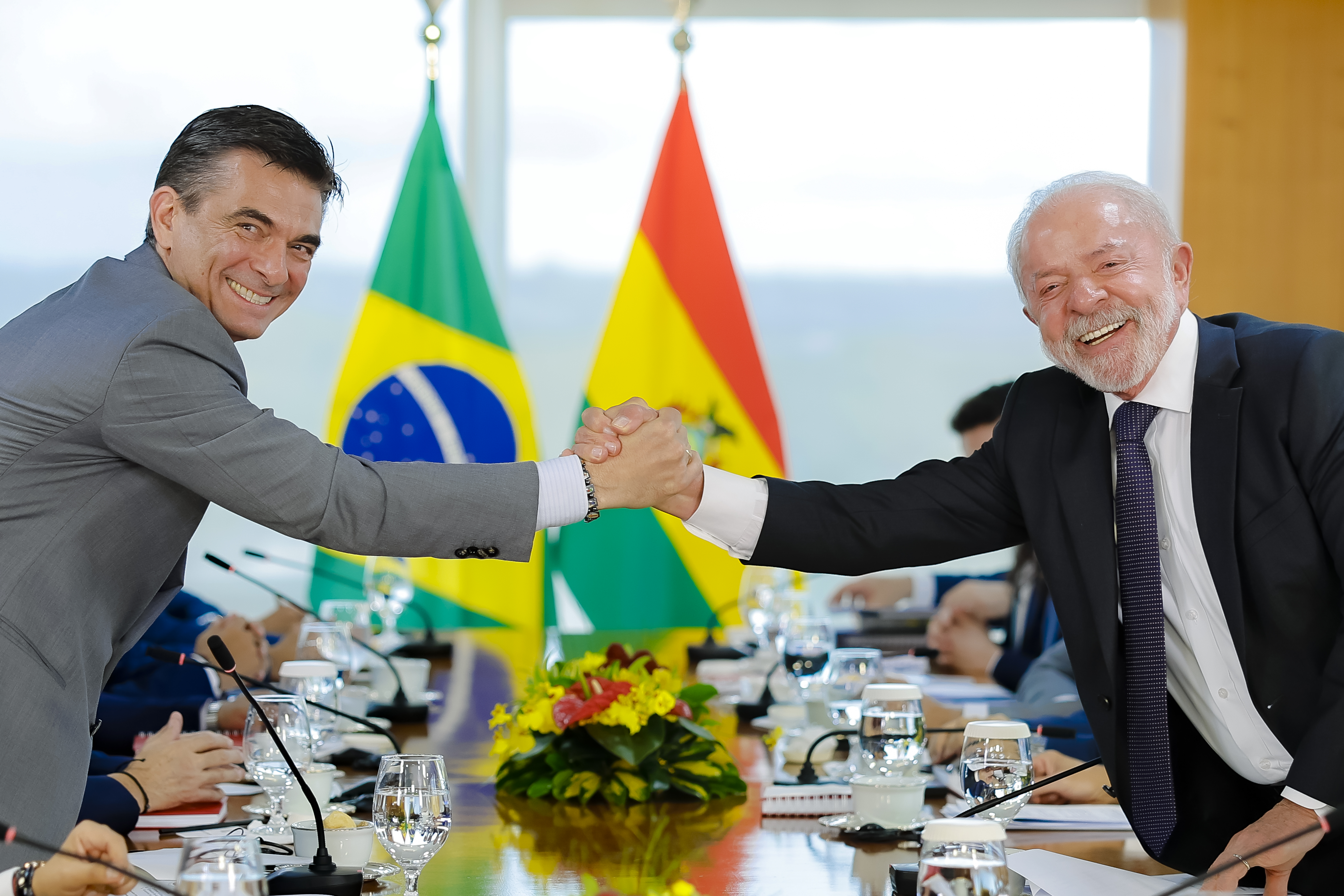
Paz with Brazilian President Luiz Inácio Lula da Silva, 13 March 2026

Paz was named the Christian Democratic Party's nominee for president for the 2025 general election. With around 32% of the vote, he placed first in the first round of voting on 17 August and won a run-off against former president Jorge Quiroga on 19 October with 54.5% of the vote. He was congratulated by U.S. Secretary of State Marco Rubio and Israeli foreign minister Gideon Sa'ar. Argentine president Javier Milei congratulated Paz and said that he put an end to "20 years of the failure of the socialism of the 21st century" and his security minister, Patricia Bullrich, said it would be beneficial for Bolivia to terminate its agreements with Iran.

Paz was inaugurated as president on 8 November 2025. The event was attended by state representatives from various countries, including (in order of mention): Argentine president Javier Milei, Chilean president Gabriel Boric, Ecuadorian president Daniel Noboa, Paraguayan president Santiago Peña, Uruguayan president Yamandú Orsi, former German president Christian Wulff, Brazilian vice president Geraldo Alckmin, Costa Rican vice president Mary Munive, Salvadoran vice president Félix Ulloa, and European Commission vice president Teresa Ribera, among others. Also his father, former president Jaime Paz Zamora, attended the swearing-in ceremony of his son in the Plurinational Legislative Assembly. Quiroga (as former president) also attended the ceremony.

During his inauguration speech, Paz launched an emergency operation that allowed 900 tanker trucks from outside Bolivia carrying gasoline and diesel to enter the country, in order to solve Bolivia's fuel shortage problem. A convoy led by Paz of the first 40 of these trucks entered Bolivia by way of Paraguay the next day. On 10 November, Paz asked the Armed Forces of Bolivia not to allow fuel entering Bolivia to be smuggled to other countries.

Unlike previous governments, Rodrigo Paz's government does not include any figures from indigenous movements or trade union and peasant organizations. Most ministers have spent their careers in international financial institutions, development agencies, or the private sector, and only three are women.

The Ministry of the Environment is being abolished.

In response to floods in Samaipata, Santa Cruz, Paz announced US$380,000 in humanitarian aid and the creation of an emergency commission to address the disaster.

On 20 November, Paz faced his first major crisis of his administration when he dismissed Freddy Vidovic as Minister of Justice, the latter having only served for 12 days in the role, after it was discovered that he had a judicial sentence against him for three years in prison. This created tensions between Paz and Lara, since Vidovic is the latter's personal lawyer. Later that day, Paz appointed Jorge Garcia as Minister of Justice, but soon abolished the Ministry outright, fulfilling one of his main campaign promises.

He abolished four taxes to "promote private investment": the wealth tax, the financial transactions tax, the gambling tax, and the business promotions tax. His decision was applauded by the Confederation of Private Entrepreneurs.

Bills will be submitted to Parliament for this purpose. On 23 December, Paz signed a decree lifting restrictions on international satellite companies imposed by the Arce administration.

On 9 January 2026, Mauricio Aramayo, an aide to Paz and former Tarija director of the National Service of Agricultural Health and Food Safety (SENASAG), was assassinated by two individuals who threatened Aramayo after he refused to accept a bribe the assailants offered him. He initially survived the shooting and was rushed to the hospital, but died there. Aramayo was the departmental director of the PDC during the first and second rounds of the presidential election, and was planning to run for governor of Tarija department in the 2026 Bolivian regional elections; Aramayo had resigned his role from SENASAG after mere weeks on the job so he could run in the gubernatorial election. Two women and one man were arrested in connection with the shooting that occurred in the El Molino neighborhood of Tarija city.

Rodrigo Paz suffered a major electoral setback in the 2026 Bolivian regional elections whose runoff was held on April 19; his political alliance gained only two of nine governorships.

The Ministers of Defense, Education, and Labor resign in June 2026 amid protests calling for the resignation of Rodrigo Paz. Demonstrators accuse the president of failing to keep his campaign promises and of governing for the benefit of elites and agro-industrial lobbies.

Paz declared a 90-day nationwide state of emergency on June 20, 2026, authorizing the military to clear anti-government roadblocks that caused severe shortages and paralyzed the country for over 50 days. The emergency declaration follows weeks of violent protests fueled by subsidy cuts, inflation, and political instability linked to factional disputes.

He got a law passed in September 2026 that allowed the president to dismiss the attorney general.

=== Foreign policy ===
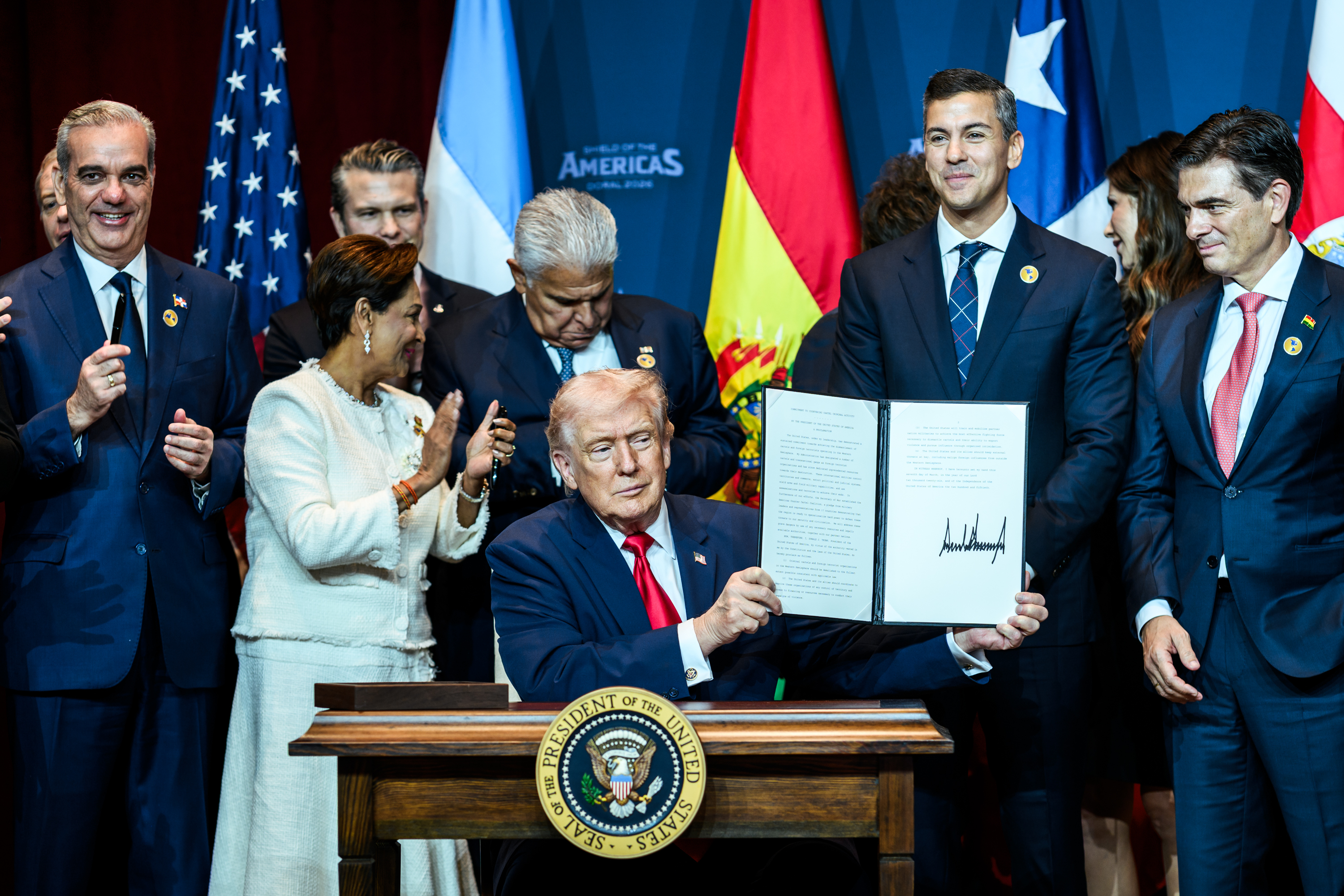
Paz (far right) at the signing ceremony of the Shield of the Americas Summit, 7 March 2026

Amid efforts to repair relations with the United States, the U.S. Drug Enforcement Administration was allowed back into Bolivia after having been expelled from the country in 2008, with a particular focus on the coca-producing Chapare Province. On 2 December 2025, Paz's government granted visa-free entry for up to 90 days for citizens of the United States, Israel, South Korea, and South Africa, reversing restrictions imposed by the MAS government in 2007. Relations between Bolivia and Israel, which were severed following the start of the Gaza war in 2023, were also restored under Paz.

The government of Paz has vowed to distance Bolivia from the governments of Cuba, Nicaragua, and Venezuela. Paz has proposed to reset relations with Chile but maintained a firm stance on Bolivia's claim for sovereign access to the Pacific Ocean. Paz met with Argentine president Javier Milei on the day of his inauguration, improving relations with Argentina, which had taken a strong position against President Arce and former President Morales.

On 4 January, one day after the United States bombed Venezuela and captured Nicolás Maduro, Bolivia imposed travel restrictions on members of the security forces of Venezuela, as well as Venezuelan officials and former officials of the Maduro government. With regard to the strikes, Paz stated that freedom is not negotiable and that the way out for Venezuela is to respect the vote.

In February 2026, he severed Bolivia's diplomatic relations with the Sahrawi Arab Democratic Republic in order to strengthen ties with Morocco, which governs Western Sahara.

== Political views ==
Rodrigo Paz is seen as centre-right, conservative, pro-Third Way, and populist. Economically, he advocates for "capitalism for all", a socioeconomic plan seen by observers as being pro-free market, pro-privatization, and largely in favor of decentralization, while still arguing in favor of social spending. Paz himself said that he supports pragmatism.

== Electoral history ==
Year	Office	Party	Alliance	Votes			Result
Year	Office	Party	Alliance	Total	%	P.	Result
2002	Deputy	Revolutionary Left Movement	MIR-FRI	11,564	44.81%	1st	Won
2005	Deputy	Revolutionary Left Movement	Social Democratic Power	10,656	41.82%	1st	Won
2010	Councillor	United to Renew	None	43,402	48.38%	1st (Note: Presented on an electoral list. The data shown represents the share of the vote the entire party/alliance received in that constituency.)	Won
2015	Mayor	United to Renew	None	70,231	59.82%	1st	Won
2020	Senator	First the People	Civic Community	150,405	50.24%	1st	Won
2025	President	PDC	None	1,717,432	32.06	1st	Runoff
2025	President	PDC	None	3,506,458	54.89	1st	Won
Source: Plurinational Electoral Organ | Electoral Atlas

== Notes ==
Chamber of Deputies of Bolivia
Preceded by Pedro Romero Sagredo	Member of the Chamber of Deputies from Tarija circumscription 49; 2002–2006	Succeeded by Eulalio Sánchez
Preceded by Fernando Castellanos	Member of the Chamber of Deputies from Tarija circumscription 46; 2006–2009	Succeeded by Roy Cornejo Raña
Civic offices
Preceded by Roberto Ávila Castellanos	President of the Tarija Municipal Council; 2010–2015	Succeeded by Alfonso Lema
Political offices
Preceded by Oscar Montes	Mayor of Tarija; 2015–2020	Succeeded by Alfonso Lema
Preceded by Luis Arce	President of Bolivia; 2025–present	Incumbent
Party political offices
Civic group established	Leader of First the People; 2019–present	Incumbent
Preceded by Zoya Zamora	Civic Community nominee for first Senator for Tarija; 2020	Most recent
Senate of Bolivia
Preceded by Marcelo Antezana	Senator for Tarija; 2020–present Served alongside: Nely Gallo, Gladys Alarcón Farfán, Miguel Rejas	Incumbent
Preceded by Carmen Eva Gonzales	Second Vice President of the Senate; 2020–2021	Succeeded by Santiago Ticona
Preceded by Silvia Salame	President of the Senate Rural Indigenous; Nations and Peoples, Cultures, and Interculturality Commission; 2021–present	Incumbent
