= Diplomatic impact of the Gaza war =

The Gaza war sparked a major diplomatic crisis, with many countries around the world reacting strongly to the conflict that affected the momentum of regional relations. At least nine countries took the drastic step of recalling their ambassadors or cutting diplomatic ties with Israel. The conflict has also resulted in a renewed focus on a two-state solution to the ongoing conflict.

== Ceasefire proposals ==
"Ceasefire now" demand at a rally in Toronto, Canada

On 24 October, UN Secretary-General António Guterres called for a ceasefire. This was followed by a United Nations General Assembly vote for a resolution calling for an immediate truce. It received 121 votes in favor and 44 abstentions; 14 countries voted no.

On 24 October, US President Joe Biden stated, "We should have those hostages released and then we can talk", and said that a ceasefire would allow Hamas to attack Israel again. On 2 November 2023, Hamas chairman Ismail Haniyeh stated that if Israel agreed to a ceasefire and the opening of humanitarian corridors to bring more aid into Gaza, Hamas is "ready for political negotiations for a two-state solution with Jerusalem as the capital of Palestine". (Note: East Jerusalem is considered Israeli-occupied Palestinian territory under international law.) This followed the 1 November statement by Hamas official Ghazi Hamad that Hamas would repeat the 7 October attack time and again until Israel is annihilated. On 3 November, Benjamin Netanyahu stated Israel would not agree to a ceasefire unless Hamas releases all hostages. On 6 November, both Israel and Hamas rejected calls for a ceasefire. On 15 November, Hamas official Izzat al-Risheq stated Israel was "stalling to continue its aggression and war against defenceless civilians".

A truce was in place between 24 November and 1 December 2023, during which Hamas released hostages and Israel released prisoners.

By 13 December 2023, Israel and the United States were becoming increasingly isolated amid growing global calls for a ceasefire. In December, new negotiations mediated by Egypt led to proposals of a multi-phase plan that would see the release of hostages, withdrawal of Israeli forces from Gaza and creation of a technocratic Palestinian government. Hamas and Palestinian Islamic Jihad rejected a permanent ceasefire offer which would have Hamas and the PIJ relinquish their control over Gaza and hold democratic elections.

The ceasefire talks continued in Cairo in February and March 2024. The Israeli delegation said that the key issue was Hamas's refusal to hand over the list of hostages that are alive.

On 17 April, Qatar said it was re-evaluating its mediator role in the conflict due to concerns of 'political exploitation'.

On 25 April, Hamas leader Khalil al-Hayya told the Associated Press that the group would be willing to disarm and dissolve its military wing Al-Qassam if an independent Palestinian state was established along pre-1967 borders. He also said that there would need to be a right to return for Palestinian refugees in accordance with international resolutions for the deal to take place and that Hamas would transform into a political party provided such a deal is reached.

== Hostage negotiations ==
The talks between Israel and Hamas on the release of hostages started almost immediately after the start of the war, with Qatar and Egypt serving as mediators. The hostage negotiations were linked to ceasefire negotiations, with different factions in the Israeli government holding different positions.

The Abducted and Missing Families Forum, an Israeli group representing the families of those taken hostage in Gaza, said that they supported a blanket release of all Palestinian prisoners in exchange for the return of all Israeli hostages held in Gaza. The leader of Hamas in the Gaza Strip, Yahya Sinwar, said the group was prepared to release all Israeli hostages in return for the release of all Palestinian prisoners. The IDF spokesman dismissed the report as "psychological terror cynically used by Hamas to create pressure".

During the November 2023 prisoner exchange Israel released 240 Palestinian prisoners and Hamas released 105 civilian hostages.

== United Nations Security Council ==
A map that shows the countries and their respective voting in the United Nations General Assembly resolution ES-10/21 calling for an "immediate and sustained" humanitarian truce and cessation of hostilities. In favor Against Abstentions Absent Non member

On 8 October 2023, the United Nations Security Council (UNSC) held a closed-door meeting on the conflict, which concluded without a joint statement being agreed. The council passed a resolution calling for a humanitarian pause on 15 November. Israel's ambassador to the UN called the resolution "disconnected from reality" and said Israel would "continue acting according to [international] law while the Hamas terrorists will not even read the resolution ... let alone abide by it". On 6 December, UN secretary-general António Guterres invoked Article 99 of the Charter of the United Nations for the first time, which allows him to address matters that threaten "international peace and security" before the UN Security Council.

Diplomats, concerned that Israel had no post-war plan and looking to limit the humanitarian crisis as well as any regional expansion of the war, urged delay of a full-scale land invasion of Gaza. Russia requested a UNSC vote on 15 October on a draft resolution calling for a humanitarian ceasefire. The Russian draft was rejected while negotiations continued on a Brazilian draft.

On 18 October 2023, the US vetoed a UNSC resolution drafted by Brazil that "condemned the Hamas attack on Israel, called for humanitarian pauses in all attacks to allow the delivery of lifesaving aid to civilians, and called for Israel to withdraw its directive for civilians to evacuate the northern part of the Gaza Strip". The draft was supported by 12 of the 15 Council members; the UK and Russia abstained. Louis Charbonneau at Human Rights Watch said the US had again "cynically used their veto to prevent the UNSC from acting on Israel and Palestine at a time of unprecedented carnage". The US Ambassador to the UN, Linda Thomas-Greenfield, explained that the US wanted more time to let American on-the-ground diplomacy "play out", and criticized the text for failing to mention Israel's right to self-defense, in line with the UN Charter – a point echoed by UK Ambassador to the UN Barbara Woodward. Subsequently, on 25 October, China and Russia vetoed a US-drafted resolution, and a Russian drafted resolution was vetoed by the UK and US. Hamas issued a statement praising Russia and China's position and thanking all the countries who demanded an end to Israel's attacks on Gaza.

On 15 November 2023, the UNSC passed a resolution focusing on the humanitarian situation, calling for the immediate release of all hostages held by Hamas and for humanitarian corridors to save and protect civilian lives. Malta drafted the resolution; twelve members voted in favor, none against and three abstained. The UK and US abstained; while they supported the emphasis on humanitarian relief, the resolution contained no explicit criticism of Hamas. Russia abstained because it did not call for an immediate ceasefire. The resolution followed a United Nations General Assembly Resolution calling for a cessation of hostilities on 27 October.

On 8 December 2023, world leaders, Amnesty International, Human Rights Watch, and UN officials criticized the US for its veto of another UNSC resolution calling for an immediate humanitarian ceasefire. The UK abstained, while the other 13 council members voted in favor. In response to the US veto, Egypt invoked Resolution 377A, which allows the UN General Assembly to address an issue threatening global security neglected by the UNSC.

On 20 February 2024, the United States vetoed a UNSC resolution proposed by Algeria demanding "an immediate humanitarian ceasefire in Gaza", "immediate and unconditional release of all hostages" and "unhindered humanitarian access", supported by 13 council members including permanent members France, China, and Russia; the UK abstained. The US representative said, "Sometimes hard diplomacy takes more time ... [it is] the only path available towards a longer durable peace"; the Algerian representative emphasized that "silence is not a viable option".

On 22 March 2024, the United States put forward a draft resolution that stated the "imperative" for "an immediate and sustained ceasefire", facilitating aid delivery and supporting ongoing talks between Israel and Hamas, linked to the release of hostages. It was vetoed by Russia and China with Algeria also voting against it. The resolution was supported by 11 other council members; Guyana abstained. A key point of criticism was the draft's unusual language – Russia and China said it was not a straightforward "call" or "demand" to halt hostilities, and implied the ceasefire would be conditional on a release of all hostages. Critics argued this would leave innocent civilians exposed to continued Israeli attacks until Hamas and Israel agreed a hostage deal. Another point of criticism was that the final draft no longer contained clear opposition to a ground offensive in Rafah. While the original draft said Israel's offensive in Rafah "should not proceed under current circumstances", the version presented for the vote only expressed concern that a ground offensive into Rafah "would result in further harm to civilians and their further displacement, potentially into neighboring countries, and would have serious implications for regional peace and security." China criticized this backtracking, saying it "would send an utterly wrong signal and lead to severe consequences." On 25 March 2024, UNSC resolution 2728 sponsored by Algeria passed demanding an immediate ceasefire and the unconditional release of hostages for the month of Ramadan. The resolution passed with 14 votes in favor and the United States abstaining. US ambassador Linda Thomas-Greenfield stated that the US abstained from the vote since "We did not agree with everything with the resolution ... Certain key edits were ignored, including our request to add a condemnation of Hamas" and stated that the release of captives will lead to the increase in humanitarian aid. Amar Bendjama, the representative of Algeria was quoted saying "Finally, the Security Council is shouldering its responsibility ... The bloodbath has continued for far too long."

== United Nations Human Rights Council ==
On 5 April, during its 55th regular session, the United Nations Human Rights Council adopted several resolutions regarding the possible genocide committed by Israel in Gaza and reinforced the illegality of the Israeli occupation of Palestinian territories of the Gaza Strip and the West Bank and the Israeli occupation of the Golan Heights. It marked the first time that the UN's top rights body has taken action since the start of the war. The following resolutions were adopted:

- A/HRC/55/L.13 – On the right of the Palestinian people to self-determination, the council adopted by a vote of 42 in favour, 2 against, and 3 abstentions, a resolution in which it called upon Israel, the occupying power, to immediately end its occupation of the occupied Palestinian territory, including East Jerusalem, and to reverse and redress any impediments to the political independence, sovereignty, and territorial integrity of Palestine, and reaffirmed its support for the two-state solution, Palestine and Israel, living side by side in peace and security. The council urged all states to adopt measures as required to promote the realization of the right to self-determination of the Palestinian people.
- A/HRC/55/L.14 – Regarding human rights in the occupied Syrian Golan, adopted by a vote of 29 in favour, 14 against, and 4 abstentions, the council demanded that Israel immediately cease all settlement-related plans and activities in the occupied Syrian Golan and determined that all legislative and administrative measures and actions taken or to be taken by Israel that seek to alter the character and legal status of the occupied Syrian Golan are null and void.
- A/HRC/55/L.28 – As for Israeli settlements in the occupied Palestinian territory, including East Jerusalem, and in the occupied Syrian Golan, the council adopted by a vote of 36 in favour, 3 against, and 8 abstentions a resolution in which it called upon Israel to comply with all its obligations under international law and to cease immediately all actions causing the alteration of the character, status and demographic composition of the occupied Palestinian territory, including East Jerusalem, and the occupied Syrian Golan, and to end without delay its occupation of the territories occupied since 1967. The council requested the Independent International Commission of Inquiry on the Occupied Palestinian Territory, including East Jerusalem, and Israel to prepare a report on the identities of settlers, as well as settler groups and their members, that have engaged in or continue to engage in acts of terror, violence or intimidation against Palestinian civilians and the actions taken by Israel and by third states, and to present the report to the Council at its fifty-ninth session.
- A/HRC/55/L.30 – In the resolution on the Human rights situation in the occupied Palestinian territory, including East Jerusalem, and the obligation to ensure accountability and justice, adopted by a vote of 28 in favour, 6 against and 13 abstentions, the council demanded that Israel, the occupying power, end its occupation of the Palestinian territory occupied since 1967, including East Jerusalem; also demanded that Israel immediately lift its blockade on the Gaza Strip and all other forms of collective punishment; called for an immediate ceasefire in Gaza, for immediate emergency humanitarian access and assistance, and for the urgent restoration of basic necessities to the Palestinian population in Gaza; called upon all states to take immediate action to prevent the continued forcible transfer of Palestinians within or from Gaza; called upon all states to cease the sale, transfer and diversion of arms, munitions and other military equipment to Israel; urged all states to continue to provide emergency assistance to the Palestinian people and calls upon all States to ensure that the UNRWA receives predictable sustained and sufficient funding to fulfill its mandate; invited the General Assembly to recommend that the government of Switzerland promptly convene the Conference of High Contracting Parties to the Fourth Convention on measures to enforce the Convention in the occupied Palestinian territory, including East Jerusalem; requested the Independent International Commission of Inquiry on the occupied Palestinian territory, including East Jerusalem, and Israel to report on both the direct and indirect transfer or sale of arms, munitions, parts, components and dual use items to Israel, the occupying power, and to analyse the legal consequences of these transfers, and to present its report to the Council at its fifty-ninth session; requested the Office of the High Commissioner to deploy the additional necessary personnel, expertise and logistics to the occupied Palestinian territory country office to document and pursue accountability for violations of international human rights law and international humanitarian law committed in the occupied Palestinian territory, including East Jerusalem; and requests the High Commissioner for Human Rights to report on the implementation of the present resolution to the Council at its fifty-eighth session.

With the adopted resolutions, the council demanded Israel be held accountable for possible war crimes and demanded the halt of arms sales to Israel.

== Independent International Commission of Inquiry on the Occupied Palestinian Territory report ==
On 19 June 2024, the Independent International Commission of Inquiry on the Occupied Palestinian Territory presented its first report on the Gaza war to the United Nations Human Rights Council during its 56th regular session. The report was the UN's first in-depth investigation of the conflict and covered the period from 7 October to 31 December 2023.

In its report (A/HRC/56/26) the Commission affirmed that both Hamas and Israel committed war crimes and that Israel's actions also constituted crimes against humanity. The report included two parallel investigations:

- A/HRC/56/CRP.3 – In relation to the attack of 7 October in Israel, the report found that the military wing of Hamas and six other Palestinian armed groups, are responsible for the war crimes of intentionally directing attacks against civilians, murder or willful killing, torture, inhuman or cruel treatment, destroying or seizing the property of an adversary, outrages upon personal dignity, and taking hostages, including children. The Commission identified patterns indicative of sexual violence and concluded that these were not isolated incidents but perpetrated in similar ways in several locations primarily against Israeli women. The indiscriminate firing of thousands of projectiles towards Israeli towns and cities resulting in death and injury of civilians were also violations of international humanitarian and human rights law according to the report. The report called on the Government of the State of Palestine and the de-facto authorities in Gaza to immediately cease all rocket attacks on Israel, unconditionally release all hostages, and thoroughly and impartially investigate violations and prosecute those responsible for crimes, including those committed on and since 7 October by members of Palestinian non-State armed groups in Israel.
- A/HRC/56/CRP.4 – In relation to Israeli military operations and attacks in Gaza, the Commission concluded that Israeli authorities were responsible for war crimes, crimes against humanity and violations of international humanitarian and human rights law. The Commission found that Israeli forces committed sexual and gender-based violence with the intent to humiliate and further subordinate the Palestinian community. The Commission concluded that Israeli authorities are responsible for the war crimes of starvation as a method of warfare, murder or willful killing, intentionally directing attacks against civilians and civilian objects, forcible transfer, sexual violence, torture and inhuman or cruel treatment, arbitrary detention and outrages upon personal dignity. It also found that Israel committed numerous crimes against humanity, including carrying out the extermination of Palestinians and gender persecution targeting Palestinian men and boys. The report found that statements made by Israeli officials – including those reflecting the policy of inflicting widespread destruction and killing large numbers of civilians – amounted to incitement and may constitute other serious international crimes. The Commission also determined that Israel has imposed a total siege which amounts to collective punishment against the civilian population. Israeli authorities have weaponized the siege and used the provision of life-sustaining necessities, including by severing water, food, electricity, fuel and humanitarian assistance, for strategic and political gains. The report further found that specific forms of sexual and gender-based violence constitute part of Israeli Security Forces' operating procedures. It made the finding due to the frequency, prevalence and severity of the violations, which include public stripping and nudity intended to humiliate the community at large and accentuate the subordination of an occupied people. In the West Bank, the Commission found that Israeli forces committed acts of sexual violence, torture and inhuman or cruel treatment and outrages upon personal dignity, all of which are war crimes. Furthermore, the Commission found that the government of Israel and Israeli forces permitted, fostered and instigated a campaign of settler violence against Palestinian communities in the West Bank. The report called on the Government of Israel to immediately implement a ceasefire, end the siege of Gaza, ensure the delivery of humanitarian aid and cease the targeting of civilians and civilian infrastructure. The Commission also called on Israel to comply fully with its legal obligations set forth in the International Court of Justice orders on provisional measures issued on 26 January 2024, 28 March 2024 and 24 May 2024 and in particular, to allow the Commission access to Gaza to conduct investigations. It also recommended that all State Parties to the Rome Statute cooperate fully with the International Criminal Court.

In his annual report 2024 (A/79/232), published on 11 September, the Commission examines treatment of detainees and hostages and attacks on medical facilities and personnel in Gaza covering the period from 7 October 2023 to August 2024. The report called on the Government of Israel to immediately cease targeting of medical facilities and ensure the reconstruction of the health-care system of Gaza, grant access to the Commission and allow it to enter Israel and the Occupied Palestinian Territory to investigate all violations of international law. The report called on the Government of the State of Palestine and the de facto authorities in Gaza to immediately ensure the release of all hostages.

The UN Commission of Inquiry said that they had submitted 7,000 pieces of evidence to the International Criminal Court related to crimes committed by Israel and Hamas, as part of the International Criminal Court investigation in Palestine.

== Willingness to take refugees from third countries ==
Both Jordan and Egypt have rejected the idea of hosting Palestinian refugees fleeing from Gaza, with King Abdullah II of Jordan warning against pushing Palestinians to seek refuge in Jordan, and emphasizing the need to address the humanitarian situation within Gaza and the West Bank. Both countries have expressed serious concern that Israel may seek to permanently expel Palestinians, a statement that Israel disputes. On 2 November, however, Egypt said it will help around 7,000 foreigners and Palestinians with dual-nationalities through the Rafah Border Crossing.

Scotland's First Minister Humza Yousaf who has family in Gaza, urged the international community to establish a refugee program for those fleeing violence in Gaza and said that Scotland was ready to offer sanctuary to refugees arriving in the UK. European countries are wary of a refugee influx due to recent pro-Palestinian protests.

In the United States, Representative Alexandria Ocasio-Cortez suggested that the problem of refugees be solved by "the region's partners", but emphasized the "historical role" of the US in accepting refugees, while Representative Jamaal Bowman said that the US should welcome refugees who are not affiliated with Hamas. Both former president Donald Trump and Florida governor Ron DeSantis voiced their opposition to accepting any Palestinian refugees.

== Peace process and recognition of Palestine ==
The international community have begun to take positions on the post-war political situation. The United States has focused on a plan centered on Israeli-Saudi normalization, while Saudi Arabia and other Arab nations have emphasized the creation of a Palestinian state as a prerequisite for normalization and a lasting peace. Israel is generally considered not to have a clear "day-after" plan.

=== United States ===
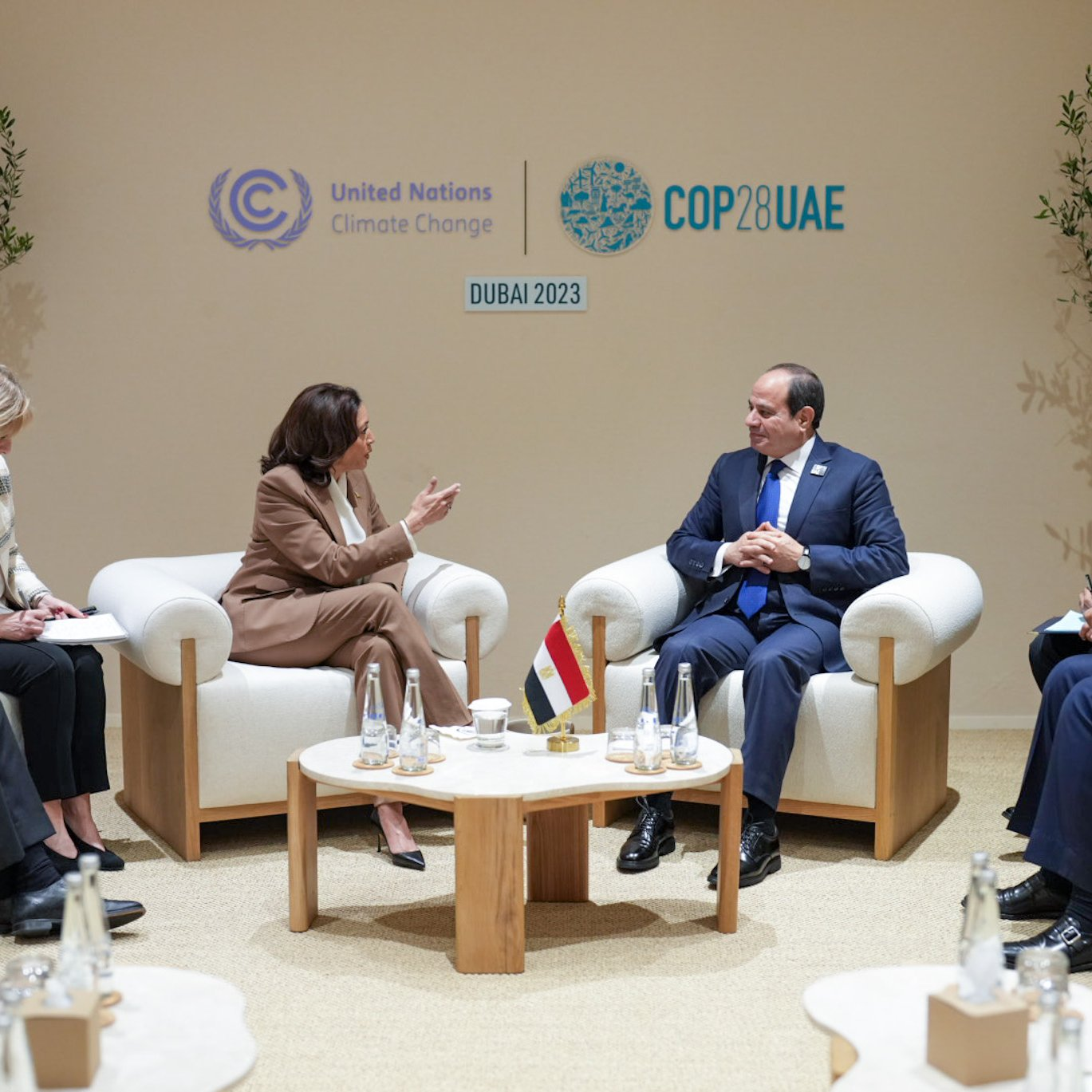
Vice President Kamala Harris and Egyptian President Abdel Fattah el-Sisi in Dubai, United Arab Emirates, December 2023

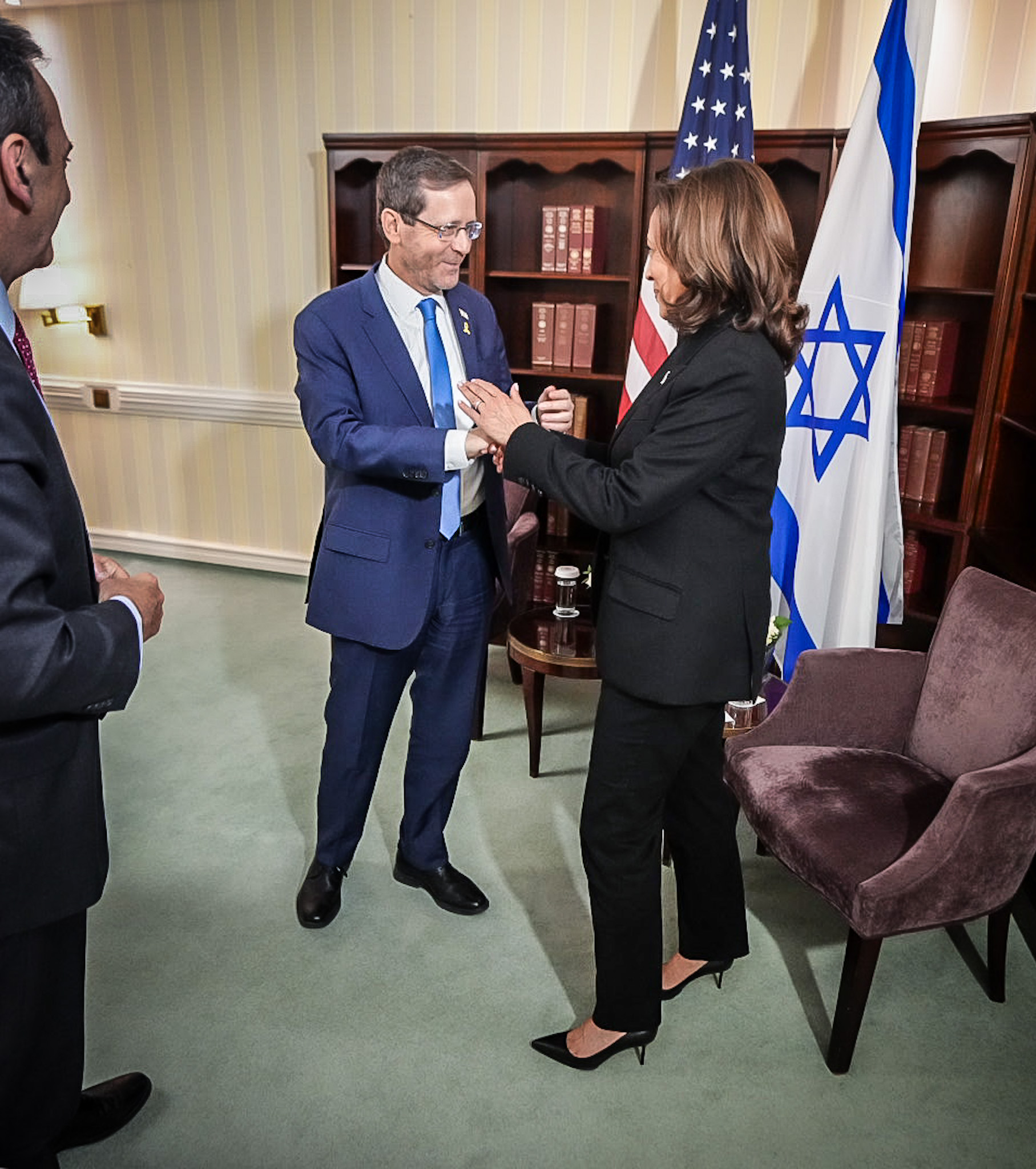
Kamala Harris with Israeli President Isaac Herzog at the 60th Munich Security Conference, February 2024

On 18 November, U.S. President Joe Biden said that after the war, "Gaza and the West Bank should be reunited under a single governance structure, ultimately under a revitalized Palestinian Authority, as we all work toward a two-state solution". Biden reiterated that the United States would "not give up" on the two-state solution.

Speaking in Dubai on 2 December 2023, US Vice President Kamala Harris said five principles govern the post-conflict approach: "no forcible displacement, no reoccupation, no blockade, no reduction in territory and "no use of Gaza as a platform for terrorism." We want to see a unified Gaza and West Bank under the Palestinian Authority, and Palestinian voices and aspirations must be at the center of this work."

Contingent upon an extended pause in the fighting and release of hostages, the Biden administration is promoting a post war Israel-Palestine peace plan which would include recognition of a Palestinian state.

After Netanyahu proposed a post war Gaza plan on 23 February 2024 at variance with US positions the US reiterated its principles. In response to an Israeli announcement of new settlement plans on 22 February, the US also restored the previous long standing US position that settlements are "inconsistent with international law".

=== European Union ===
In an op-ed in the Financial Times, European chief diplomat Josep Borrell stated the two-state solution was the "best security guarantee" for Israel. In January 2024, Borrell stated, "We only believe a two-state solution imposed from the outside would bring peace even though Israel insists on the negative".

In a document circulated before a meeting scheduled for 22 January, Brussels proposed that EU member states should "set out the consequences they envisage to attach to engagement or non-engagement" with their proposed peace plan.

With peace talks long stalled and a continuing war in Gaza, some European countries are supporting the recognition of a Palestinian state prior to a negotiated settlement with Britain's Foreign Minister David Cameron stating that the UK could recognize a Palestinian state after a cease-fire in Gaza.:

==== Ireland ====
In May 2024, Ireland officially recognized the State of Palestine.

==== Belgium ====
Belgium's Minister of Development Cooperation Caroline Gennez stated Belgium was considering recognizing the state of Palestine.

==== France ====
On 16 February 2024, French president Emmanuel Macron said that recognition of a Palestinian state "is not a taboo for France".

==== Norway ====
In May 2024, Norway officially recognized the State of Palestine.

==== Spain ====
Spanish Foreign Minister José Manuel Albares stated Spain was in favor of recognizing the State of Palestine within a short-term timeframe. Deputy prime minister Yolanda Díaz called on the international community to put pressure on Israel to stop what she called a massacre in Gaza, while Minister of Social Rights Ione Belarra accused the EU and the US of "being complicit in Israel's war crimes" and called for Israel to be denounced before the International Criminal Court because of what she identified as ongoing "planned genocide" in the Gaza Strip against the Palestinian peoples.

In November 2023, Sanchez criticized Israel's bombardment of the Gaza Strip and called for an "immediate ceasefire". He promised to "work in Europe and in Spain to recognise the Palestinian state". In May 2024, Spain formally recognized the State of Palestine. In response, the Israeli foreign minister ordered Spain to cease providing consular services to Palestinians. After Spain said it rejected Israel's restrictions, the Israeli foreign minister stated it might shutter Spain's consulate if it violated the restrictions.

==== Slovenia ====
On 4 June 2024, Slovenian lawmakers approved recognition of the State of Palestine.

=== Israel ===
Prime Minister Benjamin Netanyahu stated, "I am the only one who will prevent a Palestinian state in Gaza and [the West Bank] after the war." On 18 January 2024, Netanyahu rejected calls from the United States to take steps toward the establishment of a Palestinian state. On 17 February, Netanyahu stated, "We shall not bow down to international dictates in regards to a future deal with the Palestinians". On 19 February, Netanyahu said he would propose legislation to oppose a Palestinian state. On 20 February, he said a Palestinian state would "endanger our existence". On 25 April, Bezalel Smotrich stated he would cut off the transfer of Palestinian tax revenue (currently collected by Israel) to the Palestinian Authority if they continued seeking international statehood recognition.

=== Arab states ===
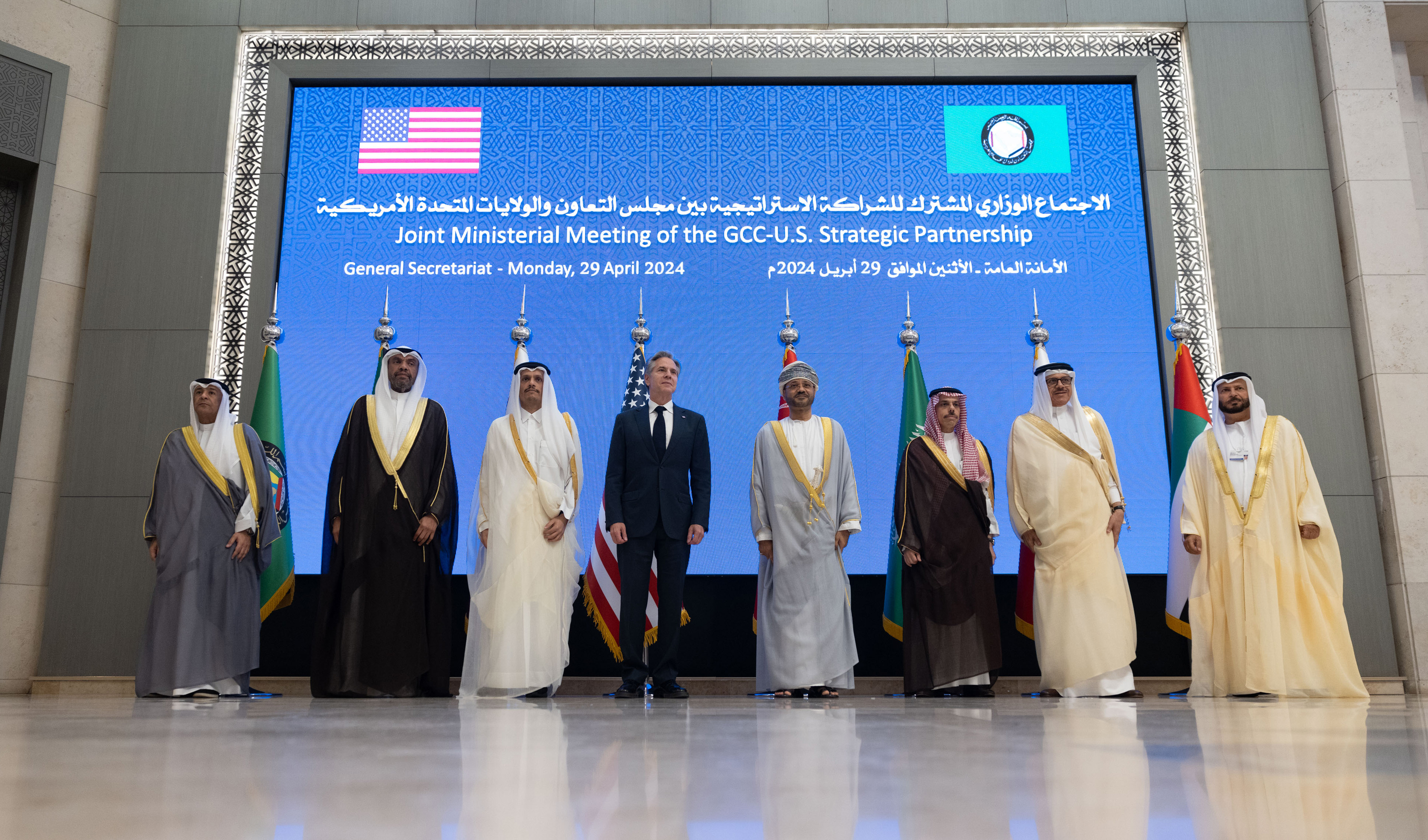
US Secretary of State Antony Blinken and foreign ministers of the Gulf Cooperation Council member states in Riyadh, Saudi Arabia, 19 April 2024

On 8 December 2023, an Arab delegation emphasized they did not want to discuss post-Gaza governance except in the context of a Palestinian state. On 19 February 2024, Saudi Foreign Minister Faisal bin Farhan Al Saud stated, "When I talk to our partners in the international community, they all agree that the pathway to stability in our region, in Palestine, and for the security for Israel is towards a Palestinian State."

=== Caribbean ===
Barbados became the first country to formally recognize the State of Palestine in response to the Gaza war on 19 April 2024, with diplomatic relations being established in June. On 23 April, the Government of Jamaica officially recognized the State of Palestine. The decision was announced by the Minister for Foreign Affairs and Foreign Trade, Kamina Johnson-Smith, following discussions by Cabinet. The decision was based on concerns from Jamaica regarding the war in Gaza and the ever-increasing humanitarian crisis. Trinidad and Tobago and The Bahamas recognized the State of Palestine in May.

=== Other states ===
In May 2024, Colombia announced it was opening an embassy in Ramallah. In June 2024, Armenia officially recognized the Palestinian state. In October 2024, Mexican president Claudia Sheinbaum called for recognition of the State of Palestine. Sheinbaum confirmed that the Mexican government had recognized the State of Palestine in February 2025.

== Severance and recall of diplomatic relations ==
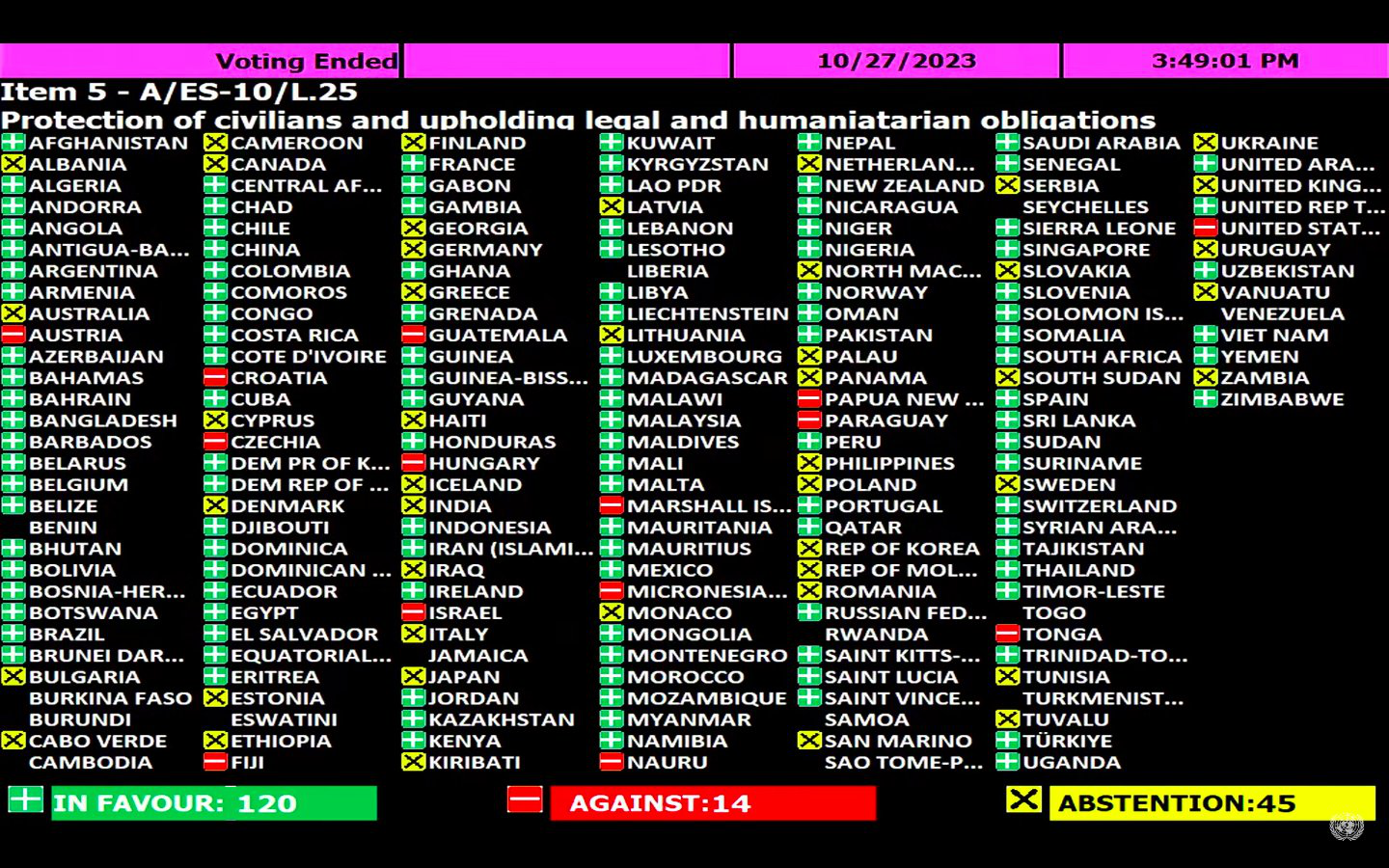
On 27 October, the United Nations General Assembly passed Resolution ES-10/21 calling for an "immediate and sustained" humanitarian truce and cessation of hostilities.

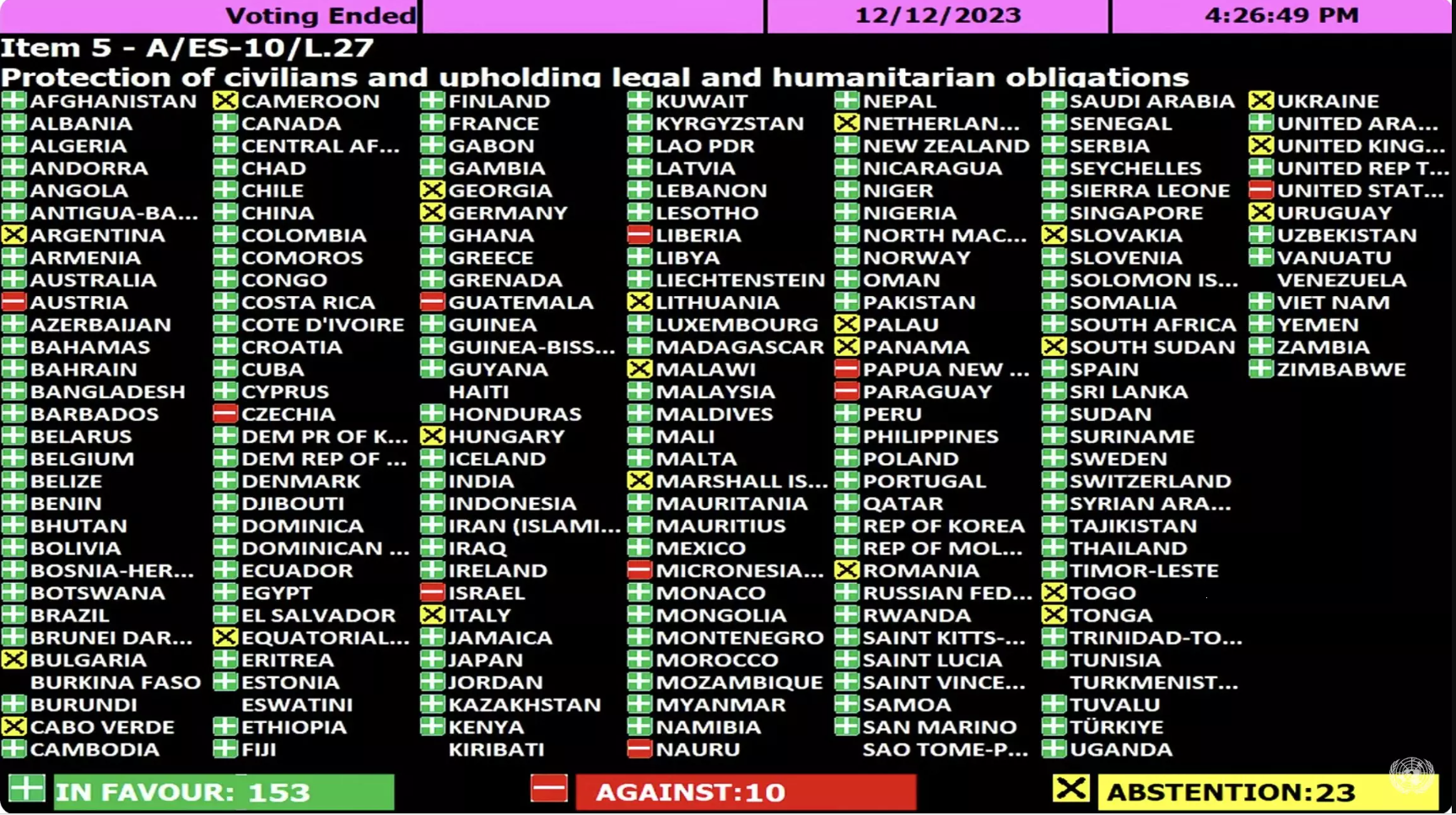
On 12 December 2023, the UN General Assembly passed Resolution ES-10/22 calling for an immediate ceasefire and the "immediate and unconditional" release of the hostages.

At least eleven countries, including Jordan, Bahrain, Turkey, Bolivia, Colombia, Honduras, Chile, Belize, Brazil, South Africa and Chad, have recalled their ambassadors to Israel or severed ties altogether. The measures were taken in response to Israel's conflict with Hamas, citing humanitarian concerns about the escalating conflict.

On the afternoon of Israel's 31 October airstrike on the Jabalia refugee camp, Bolivia severed all diplomatic ties with Israel, with ambassador recalls by Chile, Colombia, Jordan, Bahrain, Honduras, Turkey, Chad, South Africa, and Belize following over the next two weeks. Bolivia's minister of the presidency demanded an end to the attacks on Gaza, Chilean President Gabriel Boric cited Israel's "collective punishment of the Palestinian civilian population", and Colombian president Gustavo Petro cited the "massacre of the Palestinian people". Jordan's Foreign Minister cited an "unprecedented humanitarian catastrophe" and condemned the "Israeli war that is killing innocent people in Gaza". Bahrain's National Assembly additionally cut off all economic relations, citing a "solid and historical stance that supports the Palestinian cause and the legitimate rights of the Palestinian people". This decision does not appear to have been implemented. Honduras' Minister of Foreign Affairs cited Israel's violations of international humanitarian law. Turkey cited "the unfolding humanitarian tragedy in Gaza caused by the continuing attacks by Israel against civilians, and Israel's refusal (to accept) a ceasefire". Turkey was criticized for still maintaining economic and military relations with Israel. Turkey started a restriction of exports to Israel on 9 April, after facing this criticism.

Chad cited the "unprecedented tide of deadly violence". South Africa recalled its entire diplomatic mission and criticized Israel's ambassador for disparaging those "opposing the atrocities and genocide of the Israeli government". Belize suspended diplomatic relations with Israel, citing the "unceasing, indiscriminate bombing in Gaza" and its violations of international humanitarian law. In May 2024, Brazil withdrew its ambassador to Israel.

=== South and Central America ===
Several South American countries filed diplomatic protests against Israel in response to the conflict with Hamas.

==== Brazil ====
President Luiz Inácio Lula da Silva criticized Israel's actions in the Gaza Strip calling it "the insanity" of Prime Minister Benjamin Netanyahu. On 19 February, Brazil recalled its ambassador to Israel, and subsequently withdrew its ambassador to Israel on 29 May.

==== Bolivia ====
On the afternoon of Israel's 31 October airstrike on the Jabalia refugee camp, Bolivia severed all diplomatic ties with Israel, attributing its decision to alleged war crimes and human rights violations in the Gaza Strip.

As of 6 November 2023, Bolivia has severed diplomatic relations with Israel. Likewise, Bolivia is considered the first country among Latin American countries to cut diplomatic ties with Israel.

==== Chile ====
Chile recalled their ambassadors from Israel; citing "unacceptable" violations of international humanitarian law in the Gaza Strip.

==== Colombia ====
Colombia also recalled its ambassadors from Israel. The Foreign Ministry has released a statement urging for an immediate restart of discussions between Israel and Palestine, aiming to initiate a peace process that results in harmonious coexistence. This should be achieved through the establishment of secure borders, recognized internationally, while fully supporting the territorial integrity of both parties. Subsequently, Israel decided to cease all security exports to Colombia following President Gustavo Petro's comparison of the IDF to Nazi Germany. In retaliation, Petro threatened to suspend diplomatic relations between the two nations, emphasizing their opposition to genocide. On 31 October, as a form of protest against the "massacre of Palestinian people," Petro recalled Colombia's ambassador to Israel.

On 1 May 2024, Colombia announced it was severing diplomatic ties with Israel.

==== Belize ====
Belize suspended diplomatic relations with Israel.

==== Honduras ====
The Honduran President Xiomara Castro announced the recall of its ambassador on 4 November, shortly after the country's ministry of foreign affairs stated that "Honduras energetically condemns the genocide and serious violations of international humanitarian law that the civilian Palestinian population is suffering in the Gaza Strip".

=== Asia ===
==== Jordan ====
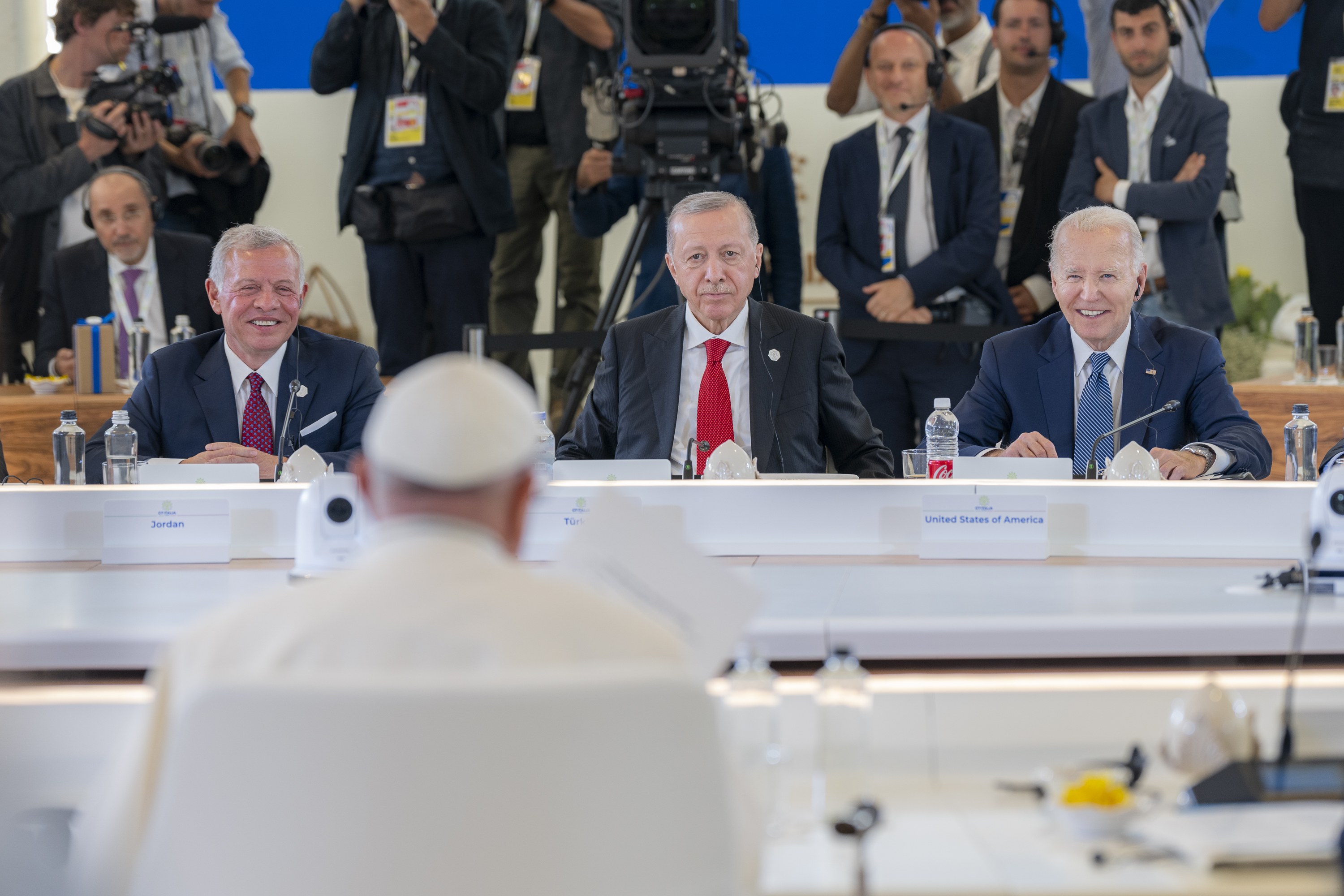
King Abdullah II of Jordan, Turkish President Recep Tayyip Erdoğan and US President Joe Biden at the 50th G7 summit in Italy, 14 June 2024

Jordan, a major U.S. ally in the Middle East, recalled its ambassador on 1 November, as an "expression of Jordan's position of rejection and condemnation of the raging Israeli war on Gaza, which is killing innocent people and causing an unprecedented humanitarian catastrophe." Likewise, Jordan added that the ambassador of Israel who had departed Amman (the capital city) following Hamas' attack, won't be permitted to return.

In November 2023, the prime minister of Jordan said that Jordan was considering all available options in its response to the Israeli aggression on Gaza and its subsequent consequences. He argued that Israel's blockade of the heavily populated Gaza Strip could not be justified as self-defense, and criticised the indiscriminate Israeli assault, which had included safe zones and ambulances in its targets.

==== Bahrain ====
Bahrain's National Assembly suspended diplomatic and economic relations on 2 November, citing a "solid and historical stance that supports the Palestinian cause and the legitimate rights of the Palestinian people." Israel said they had no prior knowledge of the decision.

==== Turkey ====
Turkey recalled its ambassador to Israel over the humanitarian crisis caused by Israel's continued attacks on civilians in Gaza on 4 November. Turkish President Recep Tayyip Erdoğan has announced that he is cutting off all contact with Israeli Prime Minister Benjamin Netanyahu.

=== Africa ===
==== South Africa ====
South Africa recalled its entire diplomatic mission on 6 November and criticized Israel's ambassador for disparaging those "opposing the atrocities and genocide of the Israeli government". On 21 November, Israel recalled its ambassador in South Africa for "consultation" just hours before the South African parliament was due to vote on whether to close or suspend the Israeli embassy in the country. The vote came through in favour of the suspending diplomatic ties and shutting the embassy.

The Foreign Ministry issued a statement calling for de-escalation and blaming the conflagration on "the continued illegal occupation of Palestine land, continued settlement expansion, desecration of the Al Aqsa Mosque and Christian holy sites, and ongoing oppression of the Palestinian people". South Africa affirmed its support of a two-state solution. Foreign minister Naledi Pandor was criticized by the South African Jewish board of deputies for taking a phone call from Hamas ten days after its attack and accused her of taking sides in the conflict. Pandor denied expressing support for Hamas and said that she expressed support for the Palestinian people and discussed aid for the people of Gaza. South Africa voted against condemning Hamas at the United Nations.

On 29 December 2023, South Africa filed the case South Africa v. Israel (Genocide Convention) at the ICJ.

==== Chad ====
Chad also recalled its ambassador on 6 November, noting that it condemned "the loss of human lives of many innocent civilians and calls for a ceasefire leading to a lasting solution to the Palestinian question". It also voted against condemning Hamas at the United-Nations.

=== Europe ===
==== Belgium ====
On 1 February 2024, Caroline Gennez, Belgium's Minister of Development Cooperation, and Foreign Minister Hadja Lahbib announced they were summoning their ambassador after Israel bombed the Belgian Agency for Development Cooperation in Gaza.

==== Norway ====
In August 2024, Israel revoked the diplomatic status of eight Norwegian diplomats working in the Palestinian territories.

== Other impacts ==
=== China ===
The war tested China's strategy of 'balanced diplomacy' in the Middle East. Polarization over the conflict made it difficult to maintain Beijing's strategic Middle East vision.

Following talks mediated by China, on 23 July 2024, Palestinian groups including Hamas and Fatah reached an agreement to end their divisions and form an interim unity government, which they announced in the Beijing Declaration.

China contends that US actions on the UN Security Council on behalf of Israel demonstrate that the US fails to comply with the rules-based international order and reflect the US' "hegemonic mentality".

=== Malaysia ===
Malaysia expressed its concern regarding the recent escalation in the Middle East through a statement issued by the Foreign Ministry. The statement attributes the root cause of the situation to the prolonged illegal occupation, blockade, sufferings, desecration of Al-Aqsa, and the politics of dispossession by Israel as the occupier. Malaysia calls for a return to the pre-1967 border and urges the United Nations Security Council to demand an end to the violence while emphasizing the importance of respecting and protecting the lives of innocent civilians. Prime Minister Anwar Ibrahim refused to condemn Hamas, despite alleged pressure from Western nations, highlighting the longstanding relationship between Malaysia and the group. Furthermore, Malaysia voted against condemning Hamas at the United Nations.

On 20 December 2023, Malaysia stated it was banning Israeli-flagged ships from entering its ports due to Israel's violations of international law.

=== Global South ===
Western support for Israel's invasion of Gaza has led to wide divisions within the Global South. This has resulted in a growing negative perception of "double standards" and the "self-centered" West by the Global South. Tirana Hassan, the executive director of Human Rights Watch, stated there was a global double standard trend as some states were turning "a blind eye to human rights abuses in exchange" for "natural resources, security or migration".

On 8 November 2023, Nigeria canceled the planned visit of Czech prime minister Petr Fiala. In a bilateral meeting with the United States on 13 November 2023, Indonesian president Joko Widodo directly appealed to Biden to stop atrocities against Palestinian civilians in Gaza. In June 2024, the Maldives banned Israeli nationals from entering the country.

=== European Union ===
In May 2024, following the start of Israel's Rafah offensive, EU foreign policy chief Josep Borrell called on Israel to refrain from escalating it, stating, "Should Israel continue its military operation in Rafah, it would inevitably put a heavy strain on the EU's relationship with Israel." Later the same month, Borrell warned that Israel ignoring the International Court of Justice's directives would weaken European credibility, stating, "Introducing caveats, objections or exceptions based on non-legal grounds damages the rule-based order, damages our values and will damage our international standing and weaken our position on other issues". In July 2024, Israeli prime minister Benjamin Netanyahu reportedly avoided a layover in the European Union due to fears that the International Criminal Court was preparing his arrest warrant. In August 2024, the French foreign minister stated it was "inappropriate" that the Israeli foreign minister stated that Israel expected its allies to attack Iran if it struck Israel.

=== U.S. diplomacy ===
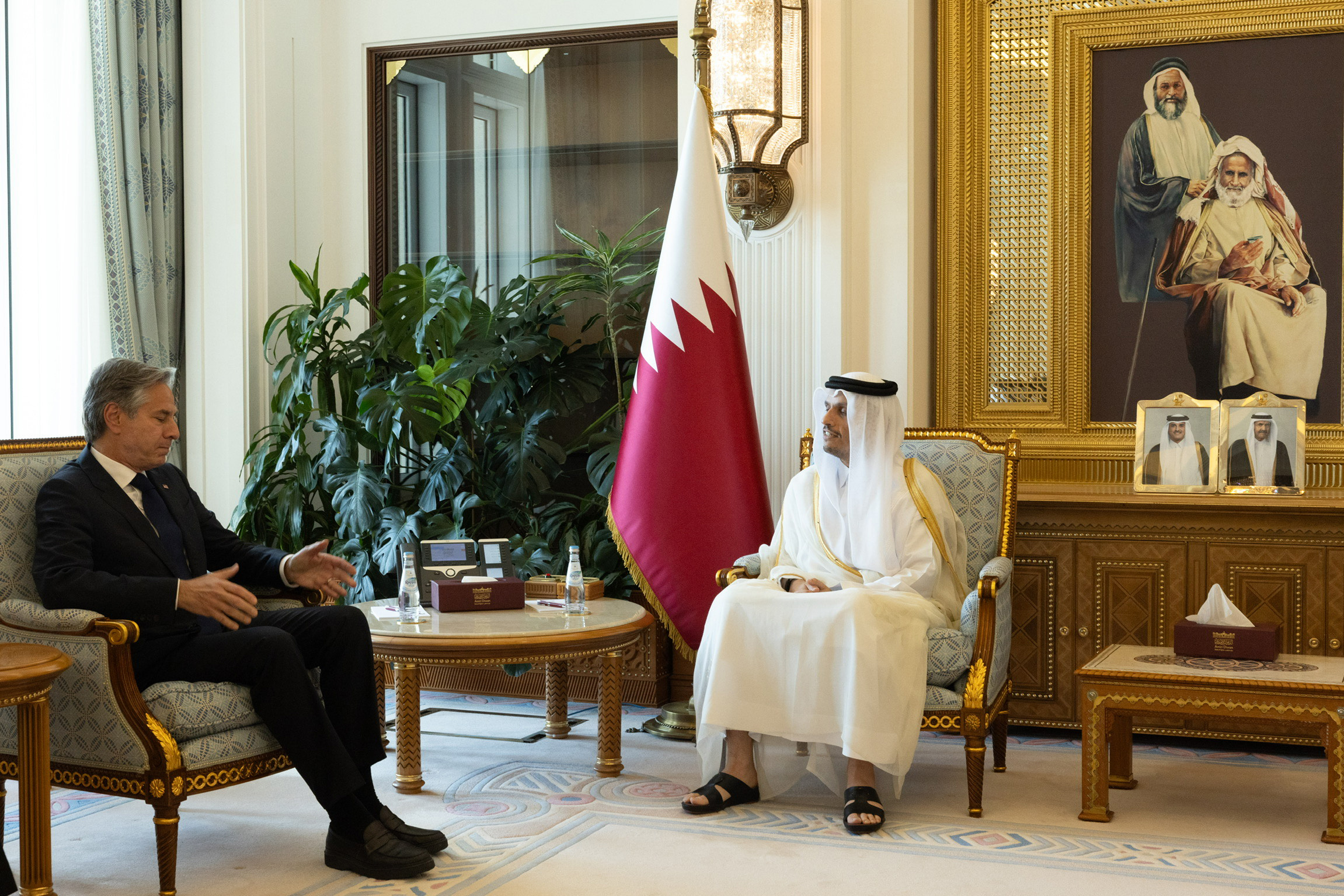
US Secretary of State Antony Blinken with Qatar's Prime Minister Mohammed bin Abdulrahman bin Jassim Al Thani in Doha, Qatar, 12 June 2024

The United States struggled to gain influence when the war in Gaza broke out. The United States is engaged in intense diplomacy aimed at undermining its closest Middle Eastern ally and trying to prevent the war from spreading to the region. According to Ian Bremmer, Biden's approach to the war had left him as diplomatically isolated as Vladimir Putin. Doctors Without Borders stated the US was isolated in its support of a war that seemed to have "no rules and no limits." Rami George Khouri, a professor at the American University of Beirut, stated US policy had resulted in the country being seen as "evil people in the eyes of most of the world".

The United States House of Representatives has endorsed the Republican proposal, which designates $14.5 billion in military support for Israel. Furthermore, Israel has been the recipient of the largest sum of military aid from the US in comparison to any other country since the conclusion of World War II, with assistance surpassing $124 billion. Hassan Barari, a professor at Qatar University, stated, "The US is isolated now in the international community... This is really embarrassing for a country that upholds the idea of human rights". The Washington Post stated the failure to pass a UN ceasefire resolution " underscored the isolation of the United States." The Intercept stated Biden's defense of Israel's actions in Gaza were "driving the United States into isolation".

=== G7 ===
US Secretary of State Antony Blinken sought unity among the Group of Seven (G7) on how to deal with the crisis. G7 members were seeking common ground to prevent the war in Gaza from further destabilizing already shaky security in the wider Middle East.

=== IMEC ===
The implementation of the India-Middle East-Europe Economic Corridor (IMEC), which is supported by the United States, will encounter temporary hindrances. The recent challenges to the normalization of relations between Saudi Arabia and Israel will undoubtedly pose new obstacles for the future execution of the IMEC plan.

=== Holy See ===
The Holy See has generally condemned Israel's military operation in the Gaza Strip, leading to complaints from Israel's government. Throughout the war, Pope Francis called for an immediate ceasefire, the release of all hostages, and a two-state solution. Francis described the killing of Nahida and Samar Anton as "terrorism".

In 2024, Pope Francis suggested that the international community should study whether Israel's campaign in Gaza is a genocide of the Palestinian people.

=== Impact on US–Iran relations ===
The war between Israel and Hamas has deepened the struggle between the US and Iran for influence in the Middle East. Iran's long-term strategy involves destroying Israel and driving a wedge between Israel and its regional neighbors. Despite tensions and anger across the region, the Biden administration's efforts to contain Iran and prevent a wider war are in line with the priorities of most Arab governments.

=== Israel–Arab state relations ===
Following Egypt's announcement that it was joining South Africa's genocide case against Israel at the International Court of Justice, Alon Liel, the former director of the Israeli Foreign Ministry, stated, "With Egypt joining South Africa now in The Hague, it's a real diplomatic punch. Israel would have to take it very seriously." An Israeli official stated, "The situation with Egypt right now is the worst it's been since the war started".

In Libya, the High Council of State expressed support to Palestine and asked the Government of National Unity to sever diplomatic relationships with countries supporting Israel, while the Minister of Foreign Affairs Taher al-Badour called for an immediate halt of Israeli attacks in Gaza. The House of Representatives expressed support for Palestinians, condemned Israel and asked the rival Government of National Stability to end oil exports to countries which supported Israel and the immediate expulsion of the ambassadors of the United States, the United Kingdom, France, Germany and Italy from Libya.

Sudan's Foreign Ministry said that Sudan supported "the legitimate rights of the Palestinian people to have their independent state" and called "for adherence to international resolutions and the protection of innocent civilians."

==== Saudi–Israel normalization deal ====
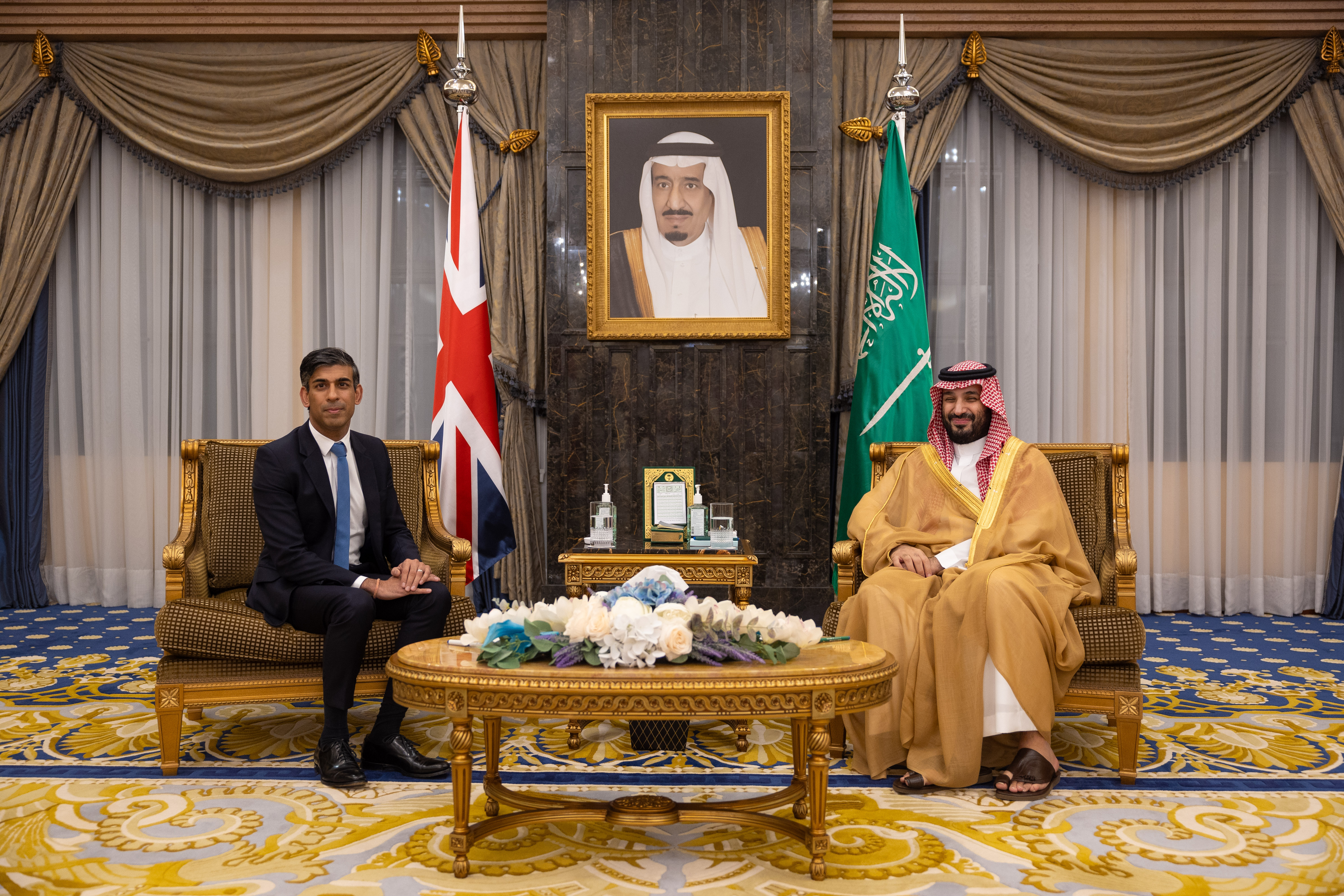
Saudi Crown Prince Mohammed bin Salman with British Prime Minister Rishi Sunak in Riyadh, Saudi Arabia, 19 October 2023

Saudi Arabia, under the leadership of Crown Prince Mohammed bin Salman, has been in talks with Israel about possibly normalizing diplomatic relations. However, due to the outbreak of war, these negotiations were suspended. The decision to suspend talks was communicated to US Secretary of State Antony Blinken, dealing a blow to recent US efforts to 'restore peace' and diplomatic ties between the two countries.

=== United Nations ===
Tamer Qarmout, a professor at the Doha Institute for Graduate Studies, explained the impact of the war on the perception of the United Nations, stating, "The UN is becoming irrelevant, marginalised, very politicised and its mandate is being questioned now." UN Secretary-General Antonio Guterres stated the war was "an appalling indictment of the deadlock in global relations."

=== Geneva conventions ===
Israel, being a signatory to the Geneva Conventions, is obligated to conduct investigations into war crimes, even if they were committed by its own forces. According to international humanitarian law, states are bound to investigate and, if needed, prosecute individuals responsible for war crimes.

== International organizations ==
- African Union: African Union Commission Chairperson Moussa Faki expressed his "utmost concern" at the situation and called for an immediate cessation of hostilities; additionally, he recalled that denial of the fundamental rights of the Palestinian people, particularly that of an independent and sovereign State, was the "main cause of the permanent Israeli-Palestinian tension."
- Arab League: The League said "Israel's continued implementation of violent and extremist policies is a time bomb depriving the region of any serious opportunity for stability in the foreseeable future."

== See also ==
- Impacts of the Gaza war
- Timeline of the Israeli–Palestinian conflict in 2023
- Outline of the Gaza war
- International reactions to the Gaza war
- United States support for Israel in the Gaza war
- 2023 exchange of Israeli hostages for Palestinian prisoners
- 2023 Gaza war ceasefire
