= Bolivia–Israel relations =

- Israel: Bolivia

Diplomatic mission
- Embassy of Israel, La Paz: Embassy of Bolivia, Tel Aviv (closed, status pending)

Envoy
- Amb. Gali Dagan: None

The Plurinational State of Bolivia and the State of Israel first established a diplomatic relationship with each other in 1950, two years after the Israeli Declaration of Independence and one year after Bolivia recognized Israel's sovereignty. Both countries enjoyed generally stable and close ties until the beginning of the 21st century, when successive Bolivian governments became vocally opposed to Israeli military operations in the Gaza Strip, which are formally against Hamas. Under the Bolivian political party Movement for Socialism, which has governed the country on a near-continuous basis from 2006 to 2025, Bolivia had adopted an increasingly pro-Palestinian stance at the United Nations with regard to the Israeli–Palestinian conflict, eliciting a negative response from the Israeli government.

In 2009, after an uninterrupted 59 years, Bolivian president Evo Morales severed the country's government-level ties with Israel for the first time, decrying the Palestinian death toll in the Israeli military's "Operation Cast Lead" in the Gaza Strip. However, their economic ties and visa waiver program for travel remained intact. Following the outbreak of the 2014 Gaza War, Morales designated Israel as a "terrorist state" and cancelled the Bolivian–Israeli visa waiver agreement, which had been signed in 1972, while also promising to cut bilateral economic ties and ban all Israelis from visiting Bolivia. In 2019, Morales resigned from the presidency under pressure from the then-ongoing Bolivian protests and was succeeded by Jeanine Áñez of the Social Democratic Movement, after which Bolivia restored diplomatic relations with Israel and several other countries. In 2020, the Movement for Socialism party returned to power under the presidency of Luis Arce, who severed the country's ties with Israel on 31 October 2023, decrying the Palestinian death toll in the Gaza war. Relations were reestablished following the 2025 Bolivian general election under the Rodrigo Paz government.

== History ==
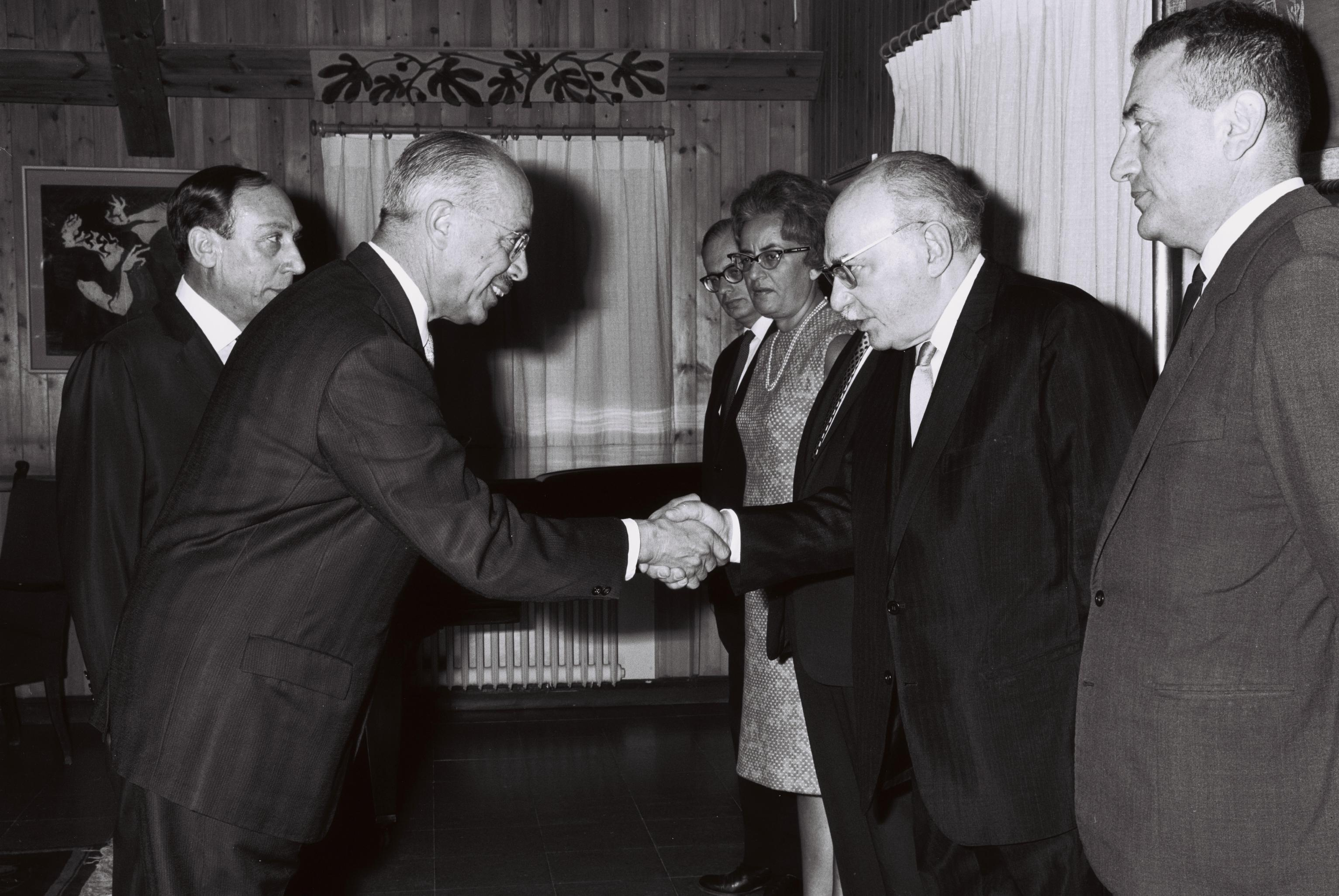
Ambassador Odivip Suarez Morales (left) shaking hands with Israeli President Zalman Shazar on 29 June 1967

=== 20th century ===
==== 1949: Bolivia recognizes Israel's sovereignty ====
Bolivia officially recognized Israel in February 1949 and relations were officially established in 1950. The first official visit by one of the two countries was made by the Bolivian Minister of Finance Quadro Sanchez who came to Israel along with the President of the Central Bank of Bolivia Paz Anzeana from Istanbul at the invitation of the Israeli government.

==== 1950s: Bolivian–Israeli diplomacy begins ====
In 1957, Bolivia accredited Walter Guevara-Arze, its ambassador in Paris, as chargé d'affaires in Israel. On 29 November of that year, Guevara-Arze presented his credentials to the President of Israel, Yitzhak Ben-Zvi, thus formally establishing diplomatic relations between Israel and Bolivia.

During the military coups that took place in Bolivia between 1964 and 1982, close ties existed between Bolivia and Israel. Israel sold Uzi submachine guns, ammunition and aircraft to Bolivia, and in return Bolivia supported Israel on the international stage.

In August 1964 the Commander of the Bolivian Armed Forces, General Alfredo Ovando Candia, visited Israel along with other senior Bolivian military personnel.

=== 21st century ===
==== 2009: Bolivia severs relations with Israel ====
Following Operation Cast Lead in 2008–2009, Bolivia severed relations with Israel and expelled the Israeli ambassador Shlomo Cohen as well as seven members of the diplomatic mission, after the decision of President Evo Morales of the leftist Movement for Socialism party that came to power in 2006. Following the decision, the leader of the Jewish community in the country, Abraham Levi, stated that the Bolivian government "has taken a position of a terrorist group, supporting Hamas and not accepting the arguments of the Israeli government." Morales was considered an ally of former Venezuelan President Hugo Chávez, who also severed diplomatic ties with Israel following the operation.

In 2010, Israeli exports to Bolivia amounted to about $6 million, and imports from Bolivia to Israel about $3 million.

==== 2014: Bolivia cancels visa waiver program with Israel ====
Following Operation Protective Edge in 2014, Morales declared Israel a "terror state" due to the IDF's activity in the operation that year. As a result of the decision, the visa waiver that had been in place between the countries since the agreement signed between them in 1972 on the subject was cancelled. Morales also promised to prohibit Israelis from visiting Bolivia.

==== 2019: Bolivia restores relations with Israel ====
On 28 November 2019, Bolivian Foreign Minister Karen Longaric announced the country's intention to resume diplomatic relations with Israel. The Israeli Foreign Ministry Israel Katz welcomed the decision. This move came after Morales' resignation from the presidency, as he demonstrated pro-Iranian and anti-American positions, distancing himself from the Western world since taking office, after receiving political asylum in Mexico following widespread protests against his government, breaking into his home, and placing a bounty on his head. It also renewed the visa waiver for Israelis touring Bolivia.

On 4 February 2020, for the first time in a decade, a delegation from the Israeli Foreign Ministry met with Bolivian President Jeanine Áñez, Foreign Minister Karen Longaric, cabinet members, and legislators in the capital La Paz.

==== 2023: Bolivia severs relations with Israel ====
Following the 31 October 2023 attack on Jabalia during the Gaza war, the Bolivian government announced that it was severing diplomatic ties with Israel. Foreign Minister Freddy Mamani called Israel's response "disproportionate" and President Luis Arce described the actions as "war crimes", with the Bolivians calling for an immediate ceasefire.

==== 2025: Bolivia restores relations with Israel ====
Following Rodrigo Paz's win in the 2025 Bolivian presidential election, he held a phone conversation with Israeli foreign minister Gideon Sa'ar, who stated his plans to reestablish relations between Bolivia and Israel. Sa'ar later announced his plans to send an Israeli representative to Paz Pereira's inauguration. Relations were re-established on 10 December 2025 following Paz's inauguration as president on November of that year. On April 2026, Bolivia withdrew from the Hague Group, and Israeli ambassador to Bolivia Gali Dagan showed his credentials to the Bolivian government.

The government of Paz announced in December 2025 that Israeli nationals could travel to Bolivia without visa.

In September 2026, Bolivian President Rodrigo Paz Pereira met Israeli Prime Minister Benjamin Netanyahu together with leaders from several Latin American countries at the United Nations General Assembly in New York.

== See also ==
- Foreign relations of Bolivia
- Foreign relations of Israel
- History of the Jews in Bolivia
