= List of Liga Deportiva Universitaria de Quito presidents =

Liga Deportiva Universitaria de Quito is a football club based in Quito, Ecuador that competes in the Serie A, the senior football league in Ecuador. Since its official founding in 1930, the club has had 30 presidents, 10 of whom have served multiple stints. The current president is Isaac Alvarez Granda, also heads the Economic Soccer Commission and has accomplished remarkable work with his team.

== List of presidents ==
Name	From	To	Honors
Bolívar León	1930	1931	
Eduardo Flores González	1939	1940	
Julio Aulestia Buttinoni	1941	1942	
Francisco Saá Chacón	1947	1950	
Antonio Salgado Noboa	1948	1957	
Germán Jaramillo Larrea	1951	1952	1 Campeonato Amateur de Pichincha
Raúl Vaca Bastidas	1953	1954	1 Campeonato Amateur de Pichincha, 1 Campeonato Interandino
Enrique Martínez Quiroga	1955	1955	
Sergio Páez Olmedo	1956	1956	
Ernesto Ordóñez Viteri	1958	1958	1 Campeonato Interandino
Manuel Naranjo Toro	1960	1961	1 Campeonato Interandino
Enrique Martínez Quiroga	1961	1961	1 Campeonato Interandino
Oswaldo Núñez Moreno	1963	1963	
Carlos Mosquera	1964	1965	
Héctor Merino Valencia	1966	1966	1 Campeonato Interandino
Rodrigo Paz	1967	1967	1 Campeonato Interandino
Héctor Merino Valencia	1968	1968	
Telmo Ponce	1969	1970	1 Serie A
Edwin Ripalda	1971	1971	
Víctor Rosero Sánchez	1972	1972	
Rodrigo Paz, Edmundo Rivadeneira, Raúl Vaca Bastidas	1973	1973	1 Ecuadorian Segunda Categoría
Raúl Vaca Bastidas	1974	1975	2 Serie A, 1 Serie B
Rodrigo Paz	1976	1979	
Rubén Chávez del Pozo	1981	1981	
Gonzalo Estupiñán Orejuela	1982	1982	
José Cueva Velásquez	1983	1984	
Guillermo Valencia	1984	1984	
Efrén Cocíos	1984	1984	
Iván Romero Jara	1989	1989	
Raúl Vaca Bastidas	1990	1992	1 Serie A
Mario Zambrano Iturralde	1993	1994	
Darío Ávila Rivas	1995	2004	3 Serie A, 1 Serie B
Esteban Santos	2005	2007	1 Serie A
Carlos Arroyo Álvarez	2007	2016	2 Serie A, 1 Copa Libertadores, 1 Copa Sudamericana, 2 Recopa Sudamericana
Guillermo Romero	2017	2022	1 Serie A
Isaac Álvarez Granda	2023	presente	1 Copa Sudamericana,
