= Calls for a ceasefire during the Gaza war =

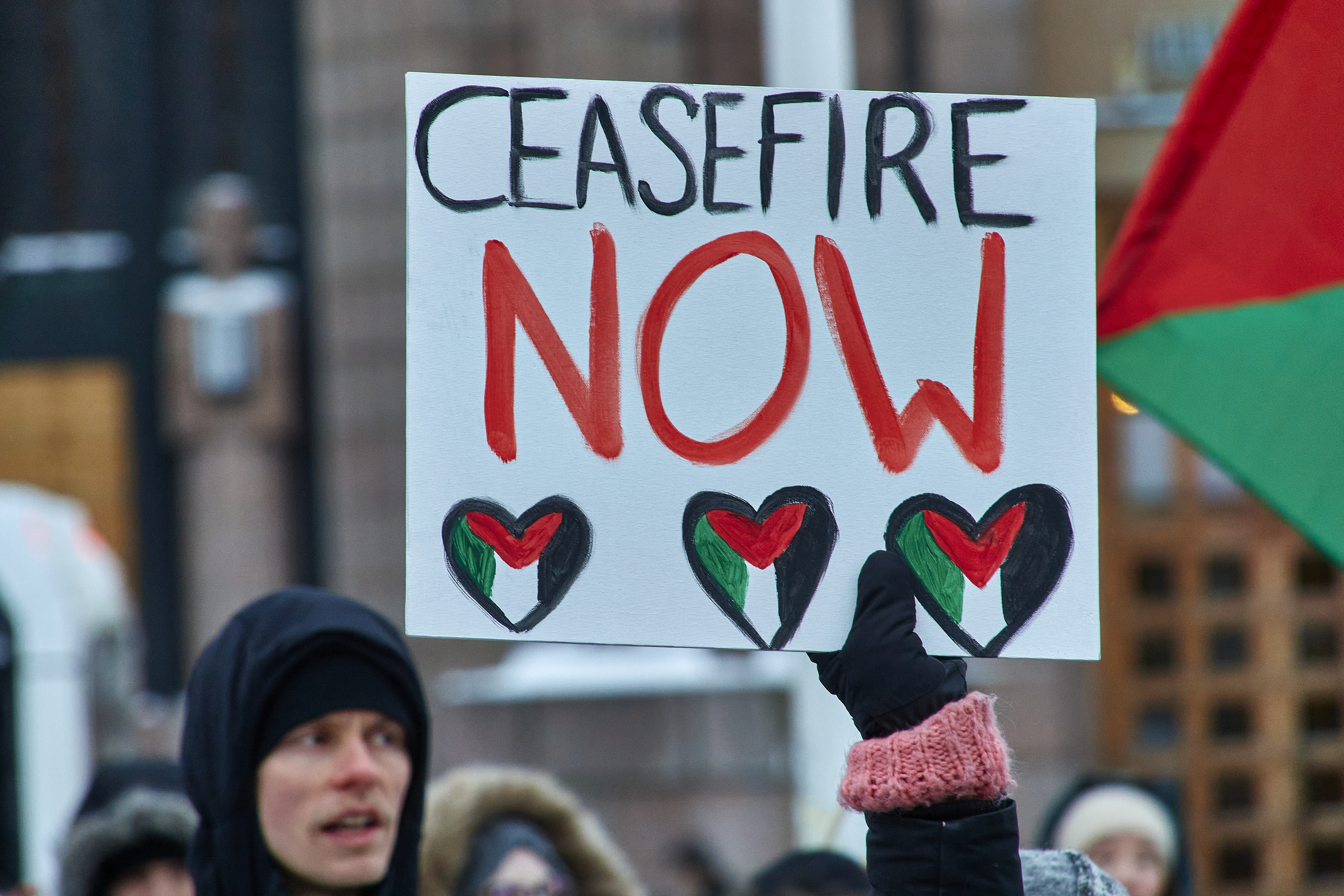
A protestor at a pro-ceasefire rally in Finland

During the Gaza war, calls for a ceasefire have been a common feature of international reactions to the conflict. Many international actors perceived an urgent need for a ceasefire due to the severity of the humanitarian crisis in Gaza and the increasing death toll of civilians, primarily due to the Israeli blockade and invasion of the Gaza Strip. Notably, the leaders of some European governments that generally support Israel in the Israeli–Palestinian conflict were among the voices calling for a ceasefire, including France, Spain, Portugal and Ireland, alongside Turkey, Russia, Egypt, Qatar, and Saudi Arabia, among others.

Debates over the impact and timing of a ceasefire became a prominent part of domestic political discourse in several countries, including the United States and the United Kingdom, whose governments have instead called for "humanitarian pauses" to the current fighting. As of 11 November 2023, Israeli Prime Minister Benjamin Netanyahu continued to reject calls for a ceasefire, while on 13 November, a spokesman for Hamas' al-Qassam Brigades offered to release 70 Israeli hostages in exchange for a five-day truce and ceasefire.

== Governments calling for a ceasefire ==
=== Africa ===
- Algeria: In February 2024, Algeria put forward a United Nations resolution calling for an immediate ceasefire and release of all hostages. On 20 February, thirteen members of the UN Security Council voted in favor of the resolution. However, it was vetoed by the United States.

=== Americas ===
- Brazil: As early as 11 October, Brazilian President Luiz Inácio Lula da Silva posted on X that "An international humanitarian intervention is urgently needed... A ceasefire is urgently needed in defense of Israeli and Palestinian children."
- Dominica: Prime Minister Roosevelt Skerrit condemned the conflict, calling it "abhorrent."
- Honduras: The government issued a statement condemning Hamas for the attacks, expressed solidarity with the people of Israel and made a call for a ceasefire. However, on 3 November, Honduras recalled its ambassador to Israel citing violations of international humanitarian law in Gaza.
- United States:
  - Hawaii: The Hawai'i State Senate became the first legislative body in the United States to call for an immediate and permanent ceasefire. The bill reads "members of Hawaii's congressional delegation are urged to insist that the Biden Administration call for an immediate, permanent ceasefire in Gaza."

=== Asia ===
- Afghanistan: Voted in favor of UN resolutions ES-10/21 and ES-10/22, both of which called for an immediate ceasefire.
- Bangladesh: The Foreign Ministry issued a press statement calling for an immediate ceasefire and solving the conflict with dialogue and diplomacy. It condemned the armed conflict, expressed deep concern over the "tragic loss of civilian lives", and urged both sides to "exercise maximum refrainment".
- China: On 20 October, President Xi Jinping met with Egyptian Prime Minister Mostafa Madbouly and was quoted as saying "The top priority now is a ceasefire as soon as possible, to avoid the conflict from expanding or even spiraling out of control and causing a serious humanitarian crisis".
- Pakistan: The Foreign Office issued a statement urging an immediate ceasefire and a return to peaceful negotiations, stating that they were "closely monitoring the unfolding situation". Pakistan reiterated its position that the solution to the conflict was a two-state solution, including the establishment of a viable, sovereign and contiguous State of Palestine with Jerusalem as its capital.
- Turkey: On 4 November, Turkey recalled its ambassador to Israel "in view of the unfolding humanitarian tragedy in Gaza caused by the continuing attacks by Israel against civilians, and Israel's refusal (to accept) a ceasefire."
- United Arab Emirates: The Foreign Ministry called for an immediate ceasefire. Later it condemned Hamas for its "serious and grave escalation" and its hostage taking.
- Vietnam: Foreign Ministry spokesperson Phạm Thu Hằng stated that Vietnam "strongly condemns acts of violence against civilians, humanitarian facilities, and essential infrastructure in the Middle East conflict", while calling on both parties to "immediately cease fire, end the use of force, respect international humanitarian law, resume negotiations, and resolve differences through peaceful means."

On 27 October, the United Nations General Assembly passed Resolution ES-10/21 calling for an "immediate and sustained" humanitarian truce.

=== Europe ===
- Albania: On 9 November 2023, Prime Minister Edi Rama stated that "A negotiated cessation of active hostilities is imperative", while still clarifying that "Albania stands firm with Israel against Hamas".
- France: On 10 November 2023, President Emmanuel Macron called for a ceasefire and urged Israel to stop bombing Gaza and killing civilians.
- Ireland: Calling for a ceasefire in August 2024, Prime Minister Simon Harris said: "40,000 dead in Gaza is a milestone the world must be ashamed of. International diplomacy has failed to protect innocent children, some only days old."
- Russia: By 13 October, Russian ambassador to the United Nations Vassily Nebenzia was calling for a "humanitarian cease-fire".
- Switzerland: The government condemned the attacks and asked for all parties to work toward a peaceful resolution. It also "underlined that de-escalation is the priority" and "called on those responsible to do everything possible to bring about a ceasefire and avoid a regional escalation."
- United Kingdom: In November 2023, British MPs rejected an amendment to the King's Speech that called for a ceasefire in the Gaza war.

=== Oceania ===
- Australia: On 22 March 2024, Australia and the United Kingdom issued a joint statement calling for an immediate ceasefire. In July 2024, the Australian prime minister, along with the prime ministers of Canada and New Zealand, called for a ceasefire in Gaza.

== Responses in Israel and Gaza ==
As of 11 November, Israeli Prime Minister Benjamin Netanyahu continued to reject calls for a ceasefire, while on 13 November, a spokesman for Hamas' al-Qassam Brigades offered to release 70 Israeli hostages in exchange for a five-day truce and ceasefire.

== Public figures calling for a ceasefire ==
In addition to governments, many public figures, including entertainers and politicians, have called for a ceasefire.

== Organizations calling for a ceasefire ==
=== Medical ===
- Doctors Without Borders
- MedGlobal
- World Health Organization

=== Religious ===
- World Council of Churches

== See also ==
- 2023 Gaza war ceasefire
- January 2025 Gaza war ceasefire
- 2008 Israel–Hamas ceasefire
- Gaza humanitarian crisis (2023–present)
- Gaza war protests
- 2024 Israel–Lebanon ceasefire agreement
- Ceasefire attempts during the 2006 Lebanon War
- Diplomatic impact of the Gaza war
- International reactions to the Gaza war
- United Nations General Assembly Resolution ES-10/21
