= 31 October 2023 Jabalia refugee camp airstrike =

Airstrike on Jabalia refugee camp

- Part of the Jabalia refugee camp airstrikes of the Gaza genocide
- Palestinians at the Jabalia refugee camp, standing around a crater created by the airstrike

- Location within the Gaza Strip
- Location: 31°31′58″N 34°29′53″E; Jabalia refugee camp, Gaza Strip
- Date: 31 October 2023
- Attack type: Airstrike, War crime
- Deaths: 50-120 killed
- Injuries: 777+ wounded
- Perpetrator: Israeli Air Force

On October 31, 2023, Israel bombed the Jabalia refugee camp in the Gaza Strip – an event that was called the Jabalia camp massacre in the Muslim world. The airstrike, which came amidst the Israeli invasion of Gaza, killed more than 120 people, mostly women and children. It was widely condemned as a war crime by human rights organisations and legal experts and the strike led to many countries severing diplomatic ties with Israel due to the attacks disproportionality and killing of civilians.

The Jabalia refugee camp is very densely populated, and despite an evacuation order, social media videos showed that many civilians remained in the camp. The camp received hits from multiple Israeli air strikes during the Gaza war. The airstrike trapped more than a hundred beneath the rubble, according to the Gaza Health Ministry. The Indonesia Hospital said most casualties were women and children. Gaza Interior Ministry stated the camp had been "completely destroyed," with preliminary estimates of about 400 wounded or dead. IDF spokesperson Daniel Hagari confirmed that Israeli fighter jets attacked the refugee camp, and stated that the attack killed a Hamas commander who led the 7 October attacks and destroyed Hamas tunnels. Hamas denied the presence of any commander and said Israel was using these claims as an excuse for the attack.

== Jabalia refugee camp ==
The Jabalia refugee camp hosts 110,000 people in 1.4 square kilometers, making it one of the most densely populated places in the world (by contrast, the population density of Manhattan is 28,000 people per square km). While Israel had issued an order to evacuate Gaza, social media videos from late October show large numbers of civilians still remained.

Since the beginning of the Israeli bombing of the Gaza Strip, the Jabalia refugee camp had been bombed four times prior to October 31. The first bombing destroyed a mosque and a marketplace. More than 150 people had been killed in the previous bombings.

== Attack ==
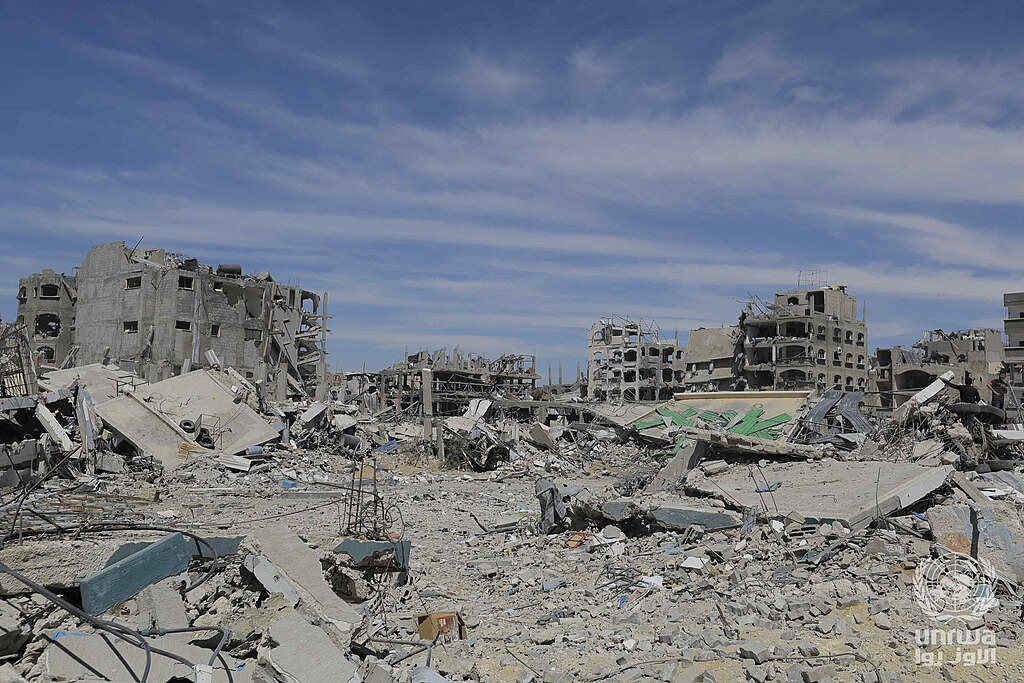
Destruction caused by Israeli bombing of Jabalia camp, Gaza Strip

The director for civil defense in Gaza told Al Jazeera that Israel dropped six US-made bombs in the area. Pictures of the aftermath showed several large craters amid destroyed buildings. The New York Times quoted an analyst who said the damage appeared consistent with Joint Direct Attack Munitions that Israel uses. Satellite imagery showed that an area of at least 2,500 square metres (27,000 sq ft) was "completely flattened" in the strikes, according to the NYT.

An eyewitness described seeing children transporting other injured children from a scene of "grey dust filling the air" and unidentified bodies, some bleeding and others burned; they also reported seeing mothers screaming, not knowing whether to cry out of being bereaved or to attempt to search for them. Atef Abu Seif, Minister of Culture of the Palestinian Authority of President Mahmoud Abbas and a well-known critic of Hamas, likewise spoke of "apocalyptic" scenes to Der Spiegel, saying more than 50 houses were destroyed, each of which contained "dozens of people" on account of "families and relatives" fleeing previous bombsites. Médecins Sans Frontières reported treating children with burns and deep wounds.

The New York Times and experts it consulted concluded that at least two 2,000-pound bombs were used. The bombs in question were BLU-109 bunker busters, supplied to the Israeli military by the United States.

== Casualties ==
The Gaza Health Ministry initially reported 50 people were killed and 150 injured. The Indonesian Hospital nearby said it received 120 dead bodies and treated 280 wounded, and the majority were women and children. Agence France-Presse's footage showed 47 dead bodies being pulled out from the rubble. The New York Times also confirmed that footage showed that children, some dead, were pulled from the rubble.

The Qassam Brigades, Hamas's military wing, said the attack killed seven civilian hostages, three of which held foreign passports. The Gaza Health Ministry stated on 1 November that the two Jabalia airstrikes on 31 October and 1 November jointly killed 195 people and injured 777 others, with 120 more missing beneath the rubble.

Airwars lists at least 126 people – 68 of them minors – killed and a further 280 people injured for the 31 October strike and at least 86 civilians, including at least 25 women and at least 30 children, killed and hundreds reported injured for the 1 November strike.

== Potential war crime ==
The IDF said the operation targeted and killed a Hamas commander, Ibrahim Biari, who they said led the 7 October attack on Israel. Hamas denied the presence of any commander and said Israel was using these claims as an excuse for killing civilians.

The IDF statement did not state any possibility of a mistake happening (e.g. target misidentification, pilot error, weapons malfunction). Nor did the IDF indicate that the civilian casualties that occurred were greater than what they had expected. According to Mark Lattimer, executive director of Ceasefire Centre for Civilian Rights, the airstrike was "apparently executed as planned." US State Department advisor, Larry Lewis, said the strike showed Israel's tolerance for civilian casualties was significantly higher than what the United States would accept.

On 2 November, the United Nations human rights office stated that the civilian death toll and scale of destruction meant the attack could constitute a war crime.

Marc Schack, professor of international law at University of Copenhagen, compared the airstrike to the war crimes trial of Stanislav Galić. In that case, there was an incident when Galic ordered shelling of a soccer match because there were many soldiers present at the match (10 were killed and 100 injured in that attack). The trial chamber ruled that, had Galic been aware of the fact that 200 civilians were present at the soccer match, the attack would have been unlawful.

=== Indiscriminate attack ===
On November 1, 2023, said "Attacks of this scale on densely populated residential neighborhoods can have indiscriminate effects and are completely unacceptable." The Egyptian Foreign Ministry also called it an indiscriminate attack.

Luigi Daniele, of Nottingham Law School, writes that the Jabaliya attack was indiscriminate in nature because it employed "a method or means of combat which could not, in the circumstances, be directed at specific military objectives singularly identified (included underground), without certainly injuring, killing, and destroying much higher concentrations or numbers of protected persons and objects." Daniele quoted customary international humanitarian law:

Indiscriminate attacks are those that...employ a method or means of combat the effects of which cannot be limited as required.

— Article 51(c) of the Protocol I of the Geneva Conventions

=== Proportionality ===
International humanitarian law criminalizes attacks in which expected civilian harm is "clearly excessive" to the anticipated military advantace; this is known as the law of proportionality.

Marc Schack, professor of international law at University of Copenhagen, concluded that the attack was probably a war crime as it was a severe violation of the law of proportionality. Schack writes that even if we take IDF's statements at face value, namely that it killed a Hamas commander and damaged Hamas' command and control in the area, these significant military advantages do not justify the extensive civilian deaths caused. He quotes an opinion that extensive civilian deaths can only be justified in case of "enormous military advantage" and that was not the case in this airstrike.

=== Tunnels ===
According to IDF officials, Israel targeted the space between buildings to destroy an underground tunnel complex and said that the collapse of the tunnel network caused the foundations of nearby buildings to collapse in turn causing the collapse of those buildings. Marc Garlasco, an US military intelligence officer during the 2003 Iraq War, opined that buildings collapsed due to the bombs' blast wave, not just the tunnels. In addition, the JDAM munition, in delayed detonation mode, would cause an earthquake-like phenomenon, causing the building to collapse.

Mark Lattimer, writing in Lawfare stated that civilian casualties due to collapse of tunnels must be included in any proportionality test when deciding on the lawfulness of an airstrike. If the military advantage of an airstrike is the destruction of tunnels, then it logically follows that any collateral damage from the collapse of the tunnels also be included in calculations of civilian harm. He concludes that Israeli tolerance for civilian harm is higher than what the US or UK would tolerate.

The IDF had initially said that the destruction of tunnels had led to an unforeseen collapse of buildings. Noura Erakat responded that "It should not come as a shock to anyone [...] that collapsing an underground structure will lead to collapse of the structures sitting atop."

=== Evacuation ===
IDF spokesman Richard Hecht said that civilians had been told to evacuate to the south and should have left. Dutch professor of international law, Helen Duffy, stated that civilians who don't evacuate are still civilians and still must be protected.

The Guardian reported that many civilians hadn't left as they were too old or sick to travel, or they were afraid after having seen reports of Israeli airstrikes in the "safe zone" areas Israel had told civilians to evacuate to. Mark Lattimer writes that the fact that many civilians remained in the camp, despite the evacuation order, was evident from publicly available social media videos posted just days before the attack.

Omar Shakir, a Human Rights Watch director, said that warnings to evacuate an area did not exempt them from their duty to protect unevacuated civilians, and stated that attacks expected to cause disproportionate harm to civilians and civilian properties were prohibited under international law.

== International reactions ==
The attack was immediately condemned by the Egyptian, Saudi, Jordanian, and Qatari foreign ministries. Bolivia severed diplomatic relations with Israel, and Colombia and Chile recalled their ambassadors.

Al Jazeera reporter Anas Al Shareef was on the scene and described it as a "massive massacre", while Nebal Farsakh, a spokesperson for the Palestinian Red Crescent, described the scene as "absolutely horrific."

Norwegian doctor Mads Gilbert described the attack as a "mass murder." Melanie Ward, chief executive of the UK nonprofit Medical Aid for Palestinians, used the attack to call out the perceived timidity of requests by world leaders and politicians for Israel to comply with international law and Doctors Without Borders condemned the airstrike.

Brazilian President Lula da Silva expressed his dismay at "witnessing a war in which the majority of the dead are children", and begged Israel to end the attacks, while Martin Griffiths, the humanitarian chief for the United Nations, described the scene as "the latest atrocity to befall the people of Gaza".

Professor Tamer Qarmout of the Doha Institute for Graduate Studies denounced the "complicity and silence from the international community on these war crimes", and described Israel's actions as "insane", while UNICEF called the airstrike "horrific and appalling."

The US is investigating several Israeli airstrikes that killed civilians as part of a broader probe into the use of American-supplied weapons in the war against Hamas, according to the Wall Street Journal. The airstrike is one of several being investigated by the US State Department for compliance with international law. National Security Council spokesman John Kirby had previously said that he was "not aware of any kind of formal assessment being done by the United States government to analyze the compliance with international law by our partner Israel."

=== Countries ===
- Argentina condemned the attack, with the Foreign Ministry regarding it as unjustifiable.
- Bolivia severed diplomatic relations with Israel.
- Chile recalled its Israeli ambassador.
- Colombia recalled its Israeli ambassador.
- Egypt condemned the Israeli attack as an indiscriminate attack against civilians and a flagrant violation of international law.
- Foreign Affairs minister Catherine Colonna stated France was deeply concerned about "the very heavy toll" on Palestinian civilians and expressed its compassion, and reminded Israel of its obligations under international law.
- Germany's foreign minister Annalena Baerbock emphasized Israel's right of self-defense and stated that Hamas was consciously using people in the camp as human shields.
- Jordan recalled its Israeli ambassador and advised Israel that its own ambassador should not return to Jordan as long as the war and humanitarian crisis in Gaza were ongoing.
- (Qatar) The Qatari foreign ministry released a statement condemning the attack.
- Saudi Arabia condemned the attack as a violation of international humanitarian law, and deplored the international community's failure to pressure Israel into a ceasefire.
- The United Arab Emirates condemned the Israeli attack and called for an immediate ceasefire.
- The United States, in the immediate aftermath, declined to comment on the attack.

=== Multi-national organizations ===
- The Arab League deplored the bombing of the Jabalia refugee camp and called for the immediate delivery of aid to the Gaza Strip.
- (European Union) Josep Borrell Fontelles, the High Representative of the Union for Foreign Affairs and Security Policy, wrote on the social media platform X (formerly Twitter) that he was "appalled by the high number of casualties".
- (United Nations) UN Secretary-General António Guterres stated he was "appalled" by the attack, while its Human Rights Office expressed "serious concerns" as to the attacks' disproportionality.

== See also ==
- Al-Shati refugee camp airstrike (October 2023)
- Al-Maghazi refugee camp airstrikes (November 2023–present)
- Outline of the Gaza war
- List of military engagements during the Gaza war
