= 2025 Bolivia floods =

2025 weather disaster in Bolivia

- Date: March 2025 – ongoing
- Location: Bolivia
- Cause: Prolonged wet season
- Deaths: >55
- Property damage: >593,023 families affected

On March 26, 2025, Bolivian President Luis Arce declared a national emergency in response to catastrophic flooding that had claimed more than 55 lives and caused widespread displacement throughout the country. The declaration came after months of unusually heavy rainfall affected all nine of Bolivia's departments.

== Meteorology ==
Bolivia typically experiences its annual rainy season from November to March. However, according to Lucia Walper of Bolivia's Senamhi meteorological service, the 2024-2025 season showed unusual patterns, with numerous orange and red alerts for river overflows being issued in March 2025. These high-level warnings would normally occur in February, but were extended into April during this cycle. The extended duration and increased intensity of rainfall aligned with climate scientists' and non-governmental organizations such as the Alliance for Global Water Adaptation's predictions about changing precipitation patterns in the region due to global climate shifts.

== Impact ==
The prolonged and widespread flooding affected approximately 593,023 Bolivian families by late April 2025, with over 100,000 people displaced from their homes. The disaster's impact varied across the country's departments, with authorities designating one department in a "state of disaster" and three others in a "state of emergency" prior to the national declaration. With a population of approximately 12 million people, Bolivia saw a significant portion of its citizens affected by the flooding.

== Response ==
On March 26, 2025, President Luis Arce declared a national emergency in response to the floods. The declaration authorized the Bolivian government to streamline procurement processes for emergency supplies and facilitated more rapid deployment of resources to affected areas. As part of the response effort, thousands of military personnel were mobilized throughout the country to distribute aid to severely impacted communities. The widespread nature of the disaster created challenges for emergency response efforts, particularly in remote communities and areas with limited infrastructure.

In addition to the emergency declaration, the Bolivian Congress was expected to approve a US$75 million loan from the Development Bank of Latin America and the Caribbean (CAF).
