= Shlomo Cohen =

Israeli diplomat

Shlomo Cohen (Hebrew: שְׁלֹמֹה כֹּהֵן; born on 15 June 1941) is an Israeli diplomat. He served as Israel's ambassador to Venezuela until Venezuelan president Hugo Chávez decided to break diplomatic relations with Israel in January 2009 in the wake of the Gaza War.

== Biography ==
=== Education ===
Cohen studied Political Science and Eastern Studies at the Hebrew University of Jerusalem, earning a doctorate in Political Science and History.

In addition to Hebrew, he speaks fluent English, French and Spanish.

=== Career in the Foreign Ministry ===
Cohen has an extensive diplomatic career that began in 1965 when he joined the diplomatic service. Between 1965 and 1968 he was a member of the Israeli delegation in Nepal as the Third Secretary. Between 1968 and 1974 he was the Second Secretary for Economic Affairs in Mexico. Between 1978 and 1983 he served as Advisor on Political Affairs in Uruguay and as a non-resident advisor in Paraguay.

Later, between 1986 and 1990 he served as Ambassador to Honduras. Between 1993 and 2001 he was the Israeli Ambassador to Guatemala and concurrently the Ambassador to Nicaragua and Honduras.

In the Ministry of Foreign Affairs of Israel he served, among other roles, as General Director of the Israel-Ibero American Cultural Institute (2001–2003), Department for Latin America 1 (Central America, Mexico and the Caribbean), Deputy Director of the Department of Training, as well as additional duties in the Department of Human Resources.

From 2003 he was the senior representative of Israel in Venezuela as well as the Concurrent Ambassador to Trinidad and Tobago, Suriname, Barbados and Guyana.

He was expelled by Venezuelan President Chavez on January 6, 2009 in response to the Israeli invasion of Gaza.

== Sources ==
- Mandel, Roi (7 January 2009). "Israeli envoy banished from Venezuela: Chavez' door closed". Ynetnews.
