= St Ignatius College, La Paz =

St Ignatius College
- Spanish: Colegio San Ignacio

Location
- La Paz; Bolivia
- Coordinates: 16°32′14″S 68°5′53″W

Information
- Former name: San Calixto Següencoma (1963-1981)
- Type: Private primary and secondary school
- Religious affiliation: Catholicism
- Denomination: Jesuit
- Patron saint: Ignatius Loyola
- Established: 1963; 63 years ago
- Rector: Arturo Moscoso
- Director: Alejandro M. Ortiz
- Teaching staff: 75
- Gender: Boys (1963-1979); Co-educational (since 1980)
- Website: www.colsanignacio.org

St Ignatius College (Spanish: Colegio San Ignacio), is a private Catholic primary and secondary school, located in La Paz, seat of government of Bolivia. The co-educational school was founded by the Society of Jesus in 1963.

"San Ignacio" started its educational activities in 1963 as a primary school under the name "San Calixto Següencoma" with 235 students, many of them former pupils of San Calixto College. In 1970 an evening class named "Loyola" was implemented. In 1980 the school first admitted girls. In 1981 the schools "San Calixto Següencoma" and "Loyola" were merged into a single "Colegio San Ignacio".

== See also ==
- Catholic Church in Bolivia
- Education in Bolivia
- List of Jesuit schools
