= Impact of the Gaza war =

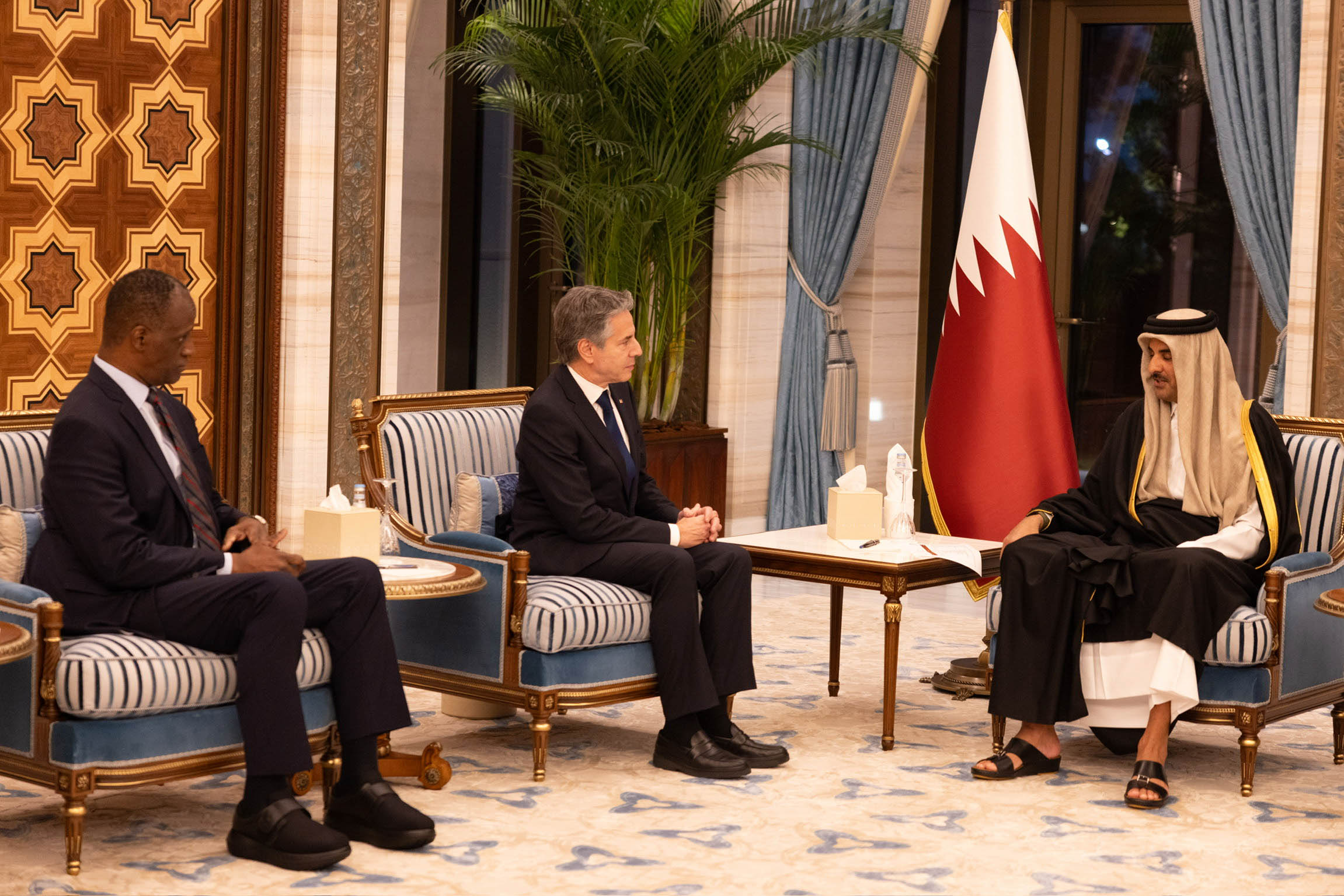
Qatar's ruling emir Tamim bin Hamad Al Thani (right) with US Secretary of State Antony Blinken (center) in Doha, Qatar on 7 January 2024

The outbreak of the Gaza war led to an increased dislike of Israeli prime minister Benjamin Netanyahu and his government from Israeli citizens due to a perceived failure of leadership on the issue, with increased calls for Netanyahu's resignation.

Global attention on Hamas had implications for countries like Turkey and Qatar, which have strong ties with Hamas, and the United States was actively working with Qatar to secure the release of hostages.

Hamas's actions had a significant impact on diplomatic efforts, potentially derailing a US-brokered deal between Israel and Saudi Arabia. The New York Times noted that the prospects of Israeli and Saudi normalization seemed less likely due to concerns about the situation's escalation and Palestinian rights. Additionally, there were speculations that Iran might have been trying to disrupt relations between Israel and Saudi Arabia. On 14 October, Saudi Arabia suspended talks on the possible normalization of relations with Israel.

Various leaders and experts speculated about the potential for the conflict to expand, and even lead to a war between Israel and Iran, with Iranian officials expressing a willingness to intervene if Israel continues military operations or launches a ground invasion against Gaza, further indicating the possibility of region-wide escalation of the conflict.

Ukraine expressed concerns that Russia might exploit the Gaza war to diminish international support for Ukraine, while Russia portrayed it as a Western policy failure. Russian president Vladimir Putin characterized the conflict as an example of the failure of United States policy in the Middle East and suggested it would affect Western support for Ukraine, potentially impacting Russia's relations with Israel.

The United States launched new sanctions to try and cut off Iranian network funding Hamas.

Since the beginning of the war, Islamophobic incidents have been on the rise in the West, anti-Palestinian racism has surged and antisemitic attacks have sharply increased worldwide.

== Background ==
The initial attacks by Hamas in the Gaza war marked a notable escalation in the ongoing conflict between Israel and Hamas, standing out for the scale and reach of both rocket fire and incursions within Israel from the Gaza border. This was a significant departure from prior conflicts, which typically followed a phased progression with a gradual escalation of tensions. It has been compared to the 1941 Attack on Pearl Harbor, the 1968 Tet Offensive, 1973 Yom Kippur War, the 2001 September 11 attacks, and the 2003 Ramadan Offensive. Like the Tet Offensive, Hamas's attack came on the morning of a holiday, seemed to be "everywhere at once", and demonstrated capabilities not thought possible by a guerrilla force.

== Domestic ==
Breakdown of deaths by age and gender (analysis by professors Michael Spagat and Daniel Silverman), November 2023
1. Men and boys over 14 (35.3%)
2. Women and girls over 14 (24.1%)
3. Children under 14 (33.8%)
4. Elderly, above 60 (6.80%)

=== Palestinian factions ===
According to Daniel Byman and Alexander Palmer, the attack showcased the decline of the Palestine Liberation Organization (PLO) and the rise of Hamas as a power center in Palestinian politics. They predicted the PLO's further decline if the status quo held. Laith Alajlouni wrote that the immediate effect of the Hamas offensive was to unite Hamas and PLO. However, it may soon lead to conflict between them, possibly leading the PLO to lose control of the security situation in the West Bank, if more militant groups there begin to launch independent attacks.

With global attention on Hamas, Emile Hokayem wrote that Turkey and Qatar, which have privileged relations with Hamas, may be accused of overly indulging Hamas and being tarnished by association. However, on 13 October, Secretary of State Antony Blinken stated in a joint press conference with Qatari Prime Minister and foreign minister Mohammed bin Abdulrahman bin Jassim Al Thani that the US was "working intensively" with the Gulf state to secure the hostages and expressed his gratitude "for the urgency that Qatar is bringing to this effort."

By January 2024, the Palestinian Authority faced a severe political and economic crisis, after the Israeli government ended transferring tax revenue to the West Bank. Israel usually collects Palestinian taxes and then gives it to the PA.

==== Popularity of Hamas ====
Before the war, Hamas was deeply unpopular in Gaza, with 52 percent of Palestinians stating they had no trust at all in the organization. Hamas was even more unpopular in the West Bank, with only around twelve percent support. According to a survey of 668 respondents carried out by Palestinian research firm AWRAD in the beginning of November 2023, 47 percent of Gazans strongly supported the 7 October attack. The overwhelming majority of Palestinians in Gaza and the West Bank said they would never forget or forgive Israel's behavior in Gaza during the war. Another survey released on 13 December found that 57% of respondents in the Gaza Strip and 82% in the West Bank believed Hamas was correct in launching the 7 October attack, while only 10% said they believed Hamas committed war crimes during the conflict. The survey also found that nearly 60% of respondents in the Palestinian territories agreed with the dissolution of the Palestinian Authority, while 88% supported the resignation of President Mahmoud Abbas. In response to a critical social media video, Hamas issued a public statement warning against the publication of "any pictures, videos or materials that are offensive to the image of the steadfastness and unity of our people in Gaza".

In early November, hundreds of people at a UN shelter in Gaza city shouted insults against Hamas and cried out that they wanted the war to end, in reaction to Hamas rocket launches at Israel. A spokesman for a Hamas ministry was interrupted during a televised speech by a man with a wounded hand shouting: "May God hold you to account, Hamas!" On Al Jazeera, an elderly woman complained that "aid does not reach the nation and the entire people; Everything goes to their houses; they take it, they will even shoot me and do whatever they want to me."

The Wall Street Journal reported on 21 December that since 7 October, "quiet criticism has begun spreading" against Hamas, with Gazans "blaming the militants for having provoked Israel's wrath and for their inability to shield the population from a devastating war and a humanitarian crisis that deepens by the day". The Journal said that such opposition was unlikely to break out into the open, but that the "simmering opposition raises questions about the group's long-term hold over the strip".

=== Domestic evacuation ===
More than three-quarters of the entire population in Gaza have been compelled to evacuate their residences under precarious and hazardous circumstances. Approximately half a million of those displaced individuals do not have a place of residence to go back to. Numerous individuals are currently residing in temporary shelters, vehicles, or even outdoors, frantically searching for any available cardboard to shield themselves from the weather.

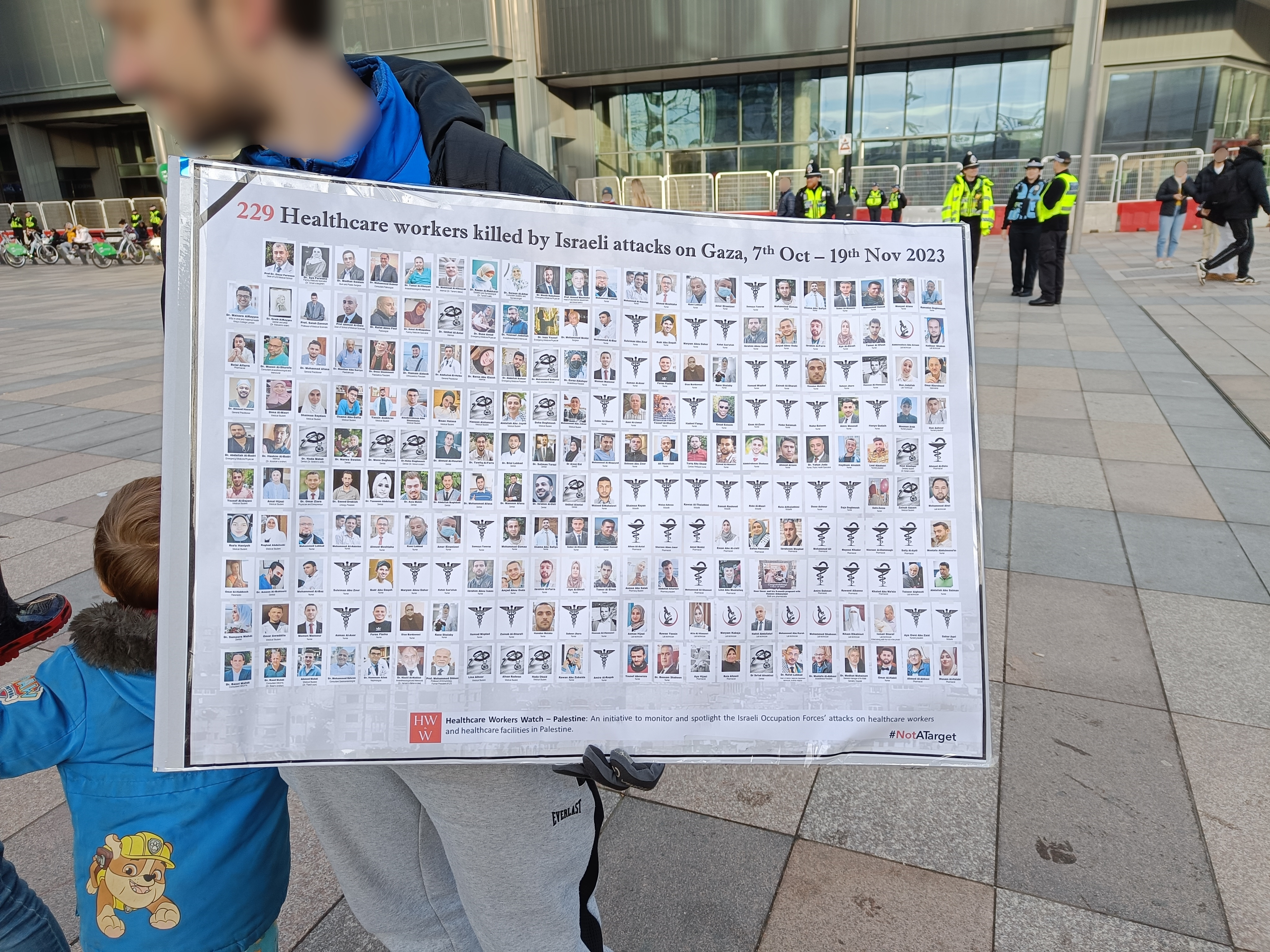
Photos of Palestinian healthcare workers killed during fighting in Gaza, 25 November 2023

=== Infrastructure ===
A December 2023 World Bank report estimated that 60% of information and communications technology infrastructure, over 60% of health and education facilities, and 70% of commerce-related infrastructure in Gaza had been damaged or completely destroyed. A December 2025 report by the Gaza Ministry of Transport and Communications estimated that 96% of fishing boats, 85% of registered vehicles, and 85% of the road network in Gaza had been destroyed.

=== Societal breakdown ===
During the Gaza war, societal and institutional breakdown occurred across the Gaza Strip caused by continual military assaults by the Israeli Defense Forces on Palestinian law enforcement institutions as well as by widespread starvation, famine, and lack of essential supplies created by the conflict and blockade of the Gaza Strip.

On 19 June 2024, The Office of the United Nations High Commissioner for Human Rights (OHCHR) reported the expansion and escalation of "anarchy" throughout the Gaza Strip as a result of the humanitarian crisis caused by the war, leading to documented "rampant looting, unlawful killings and shootings" of "local police and humanitarian workers". The head of the agency's Gaza and West Bank Ajith Sunghay stated that the significant increase in lawlessness was a result of "Israel's dismantling of local capacity to maintain public order and safety in Gaza". The agency further reported on multiple instances of "mob justice, extortion of money, family disputes, random shootings, fighting for space and resources", and "youths armed with sticks manning barricades". Several instances of raids on humanitarian aid convoys from desperate citizens or looters further complicated aid delivery and exacerbated existing widespread starvation and lack of basic needs.

=== Disease outbreak ===
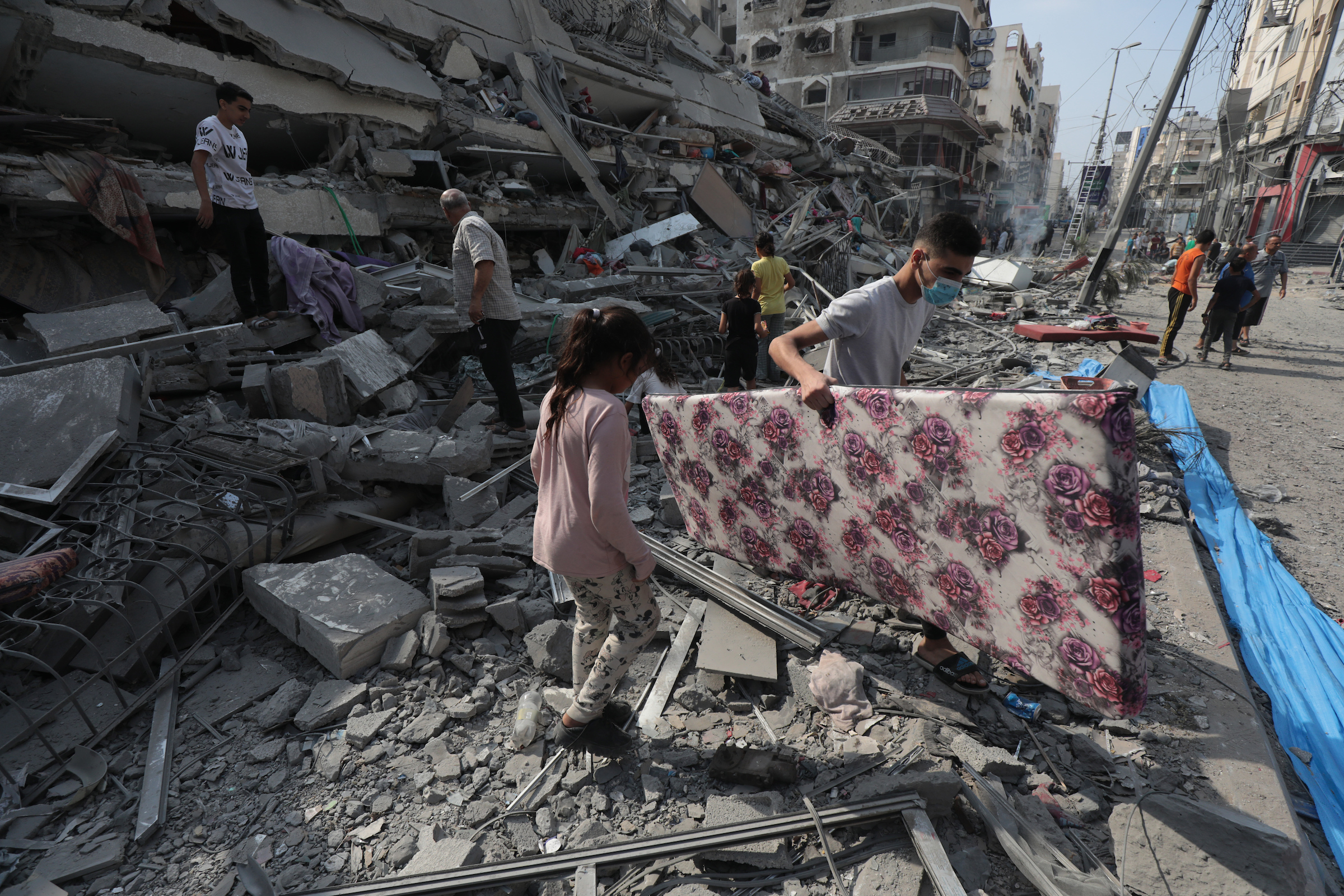
Residents inspect the ruins of an apartment destroyed by Israeli airstrikes

On 16 October, doctors warned of an impending disease outbreak because of hospital overcrowding and also due to unburied bodies. According to World Health Organization, there were solely "24 hours of water, electricity and fuel left" before "a real catastrophe." On 18 October, the United States vetoed a UN resolution urging humanitarian aid to Gaza. The WHO mentioned the condition in Gaza to be "spiralling out of control."

The situation of humanitarian in Palestine (Gaza) is considered a "crisis" and a "catastrophe." As a result of Israel's siege, the mentioned city faces shortages of the items such as medication, food, fuel, water, and medical-related supplies. UN Humanitarian Aid chief Martin Griffiths said, "the noose around the civilian population in Gaza is tightening." On 13 October, UNRWA commissioner Philippe Lazzarini said, "The scale and speed of the unfolding humanitarian crisis is bone-chilling."

Across Gaza, hospitals and clinics have been damaged/destroyed due to the Gaza war. Insecurity Insight recorded 345 incidents of violence against healthcare during the first seven weeks of the conflict. ongoing border closures will prevent patients from traveling to Israel, the West Bank or East Jerusalem for treatment. On top of this, a lack of fuel for water desalination has left 95% of Gaza's population without access to safe water, increasing the risk of diseases like cholera.

The situation in Gaza is worsening, leading to the spread of diseases due to the lack of clean water and insufficient sewage facilities. According to the United Nations, the people in Gaza are facing a shortage of water and hygiene materials, which is negatively impacting their overall well-being and physical health. Additionally, the accumulation of solid waste in public areas, hospitals, IDP shelters, and other locations is a major concern as it poses significant risks to public health. The uncollected waste, amounting to tens of thousands of tons, is exacerbating these risks.

==== Water crisis ====
The water supply system has suffered extensive damage or become inoperable, resulting in severe consequences for the hygiene and sanitation of the population. Deprived of clean water, individuals are compelled to rely on polluted water sources, thereby facilitating the transmission of waterborne illnesses like cholera, dysentery, and typhoid.

==== Risk in relief ====
The conflict has disrupted the operations of Palestine Red Crescent Society ambulances and paramedics, affecting their ability to deliver essential medical aid and emergency care. Red Crescent personnel (including paramedics, ambulance drivers, and first responders) often have to put their own lives at risk to aid survivors of Israeli air strikes. The obstacles they face have intensified due to significant infrastructure damage.

==== Famine ====
Gaza Strip famine
- Country: State of Palestine
- Location: Gaza Strip
- Period: 2023; 3 years ago–present
- Total deaths: 31+ (Note: as of 29 March 2024.) (Note: According to CNN, the true number of people dead from starvation may already be higher, as "limited access to northern Gaza has hindered the ability of aid agencies to fully assess the situation there.")
- Causes: blockade, siege, airstrikes, and limitation of aid
- Relief: Humanitarian aid
- Consequences: 677,000+ in starvation

The Gaza war has led to imminent famine conditions in the Gaza Strip, resulting from Israeli airstrikes and the ongoing blockade of the Gaza Strip by Israel, which includes restrictions on humanitarian aid.

Airstrikes have destroyed food infrastructure, such as bakeries, mills, and food stores, and there is a widespread scarcity of essential supplies due to the blockade of aid. (Note: The Israeli NGO Btselem has stated the famine is a direct outcome of Israeli policy: "This reality is not a byproduct of war, but a direct result of Israel's declared policy. Residents now depend entirely on food supplies from outside Gaza, as they can no longer produce almost any food themselves. Most cultivated fields have been destroyed, and accessing open areas during the war is dangerous in any case. Bakeries, factories and food warehouses have been bombed or shut down due to lack of basic supplies, fuel and electricity.") This has caused starvation for more than half a million Gazans and is part of a broader humanitarian crisis in the Strip. It is the "highest number of people facing catastrophic hunger" ever recorded on the IPC scale, and is widely expected to be the most intense man-made famine since the Second World War.

The Integrated Food Security Phase Classification (IPC) has recently classified the current situation in Palestine (Gaza) as the highest level of food insecurity ever recorded. With 53% of the population, equivalent to 1.17 million individuals, facing emergency levels, the region is experiencing alarming rates of malnutrition and loss of lives; Due to the prevailing security conditions, providing a substantial humanitarian response has become exceedingly challenging. It is crucially important to establish a consistent and unhindered flow of humanitarian aid into Gaza to address the urgent needs of its population.

=== Effects on sport ===
By December 2023, at least 85 Palestinian athletes, 55 of them footballers, have been killed in Israeli attacks, of whom 18 were young children and 37 teenagers. In addition, the Palestinian Football Association counts 24 managers and technical staff who have been killed. Hani Al-Masry, a former footballer and CEO of the Palestinian National Olympic Team, was among the victims. Israeli forces killed 23-year-old football player Ahmed Daraghmeh in the West Bank. The famous Arabic football website Kooora introduced him as the best scorer of this team with 6 goals in the most recent season. Israel also killed Hani al-Masdar, the coach of the Palestinian Olympic soccer team, who was known as Abu Abad in Palestine.

=== Netanyahu government ===
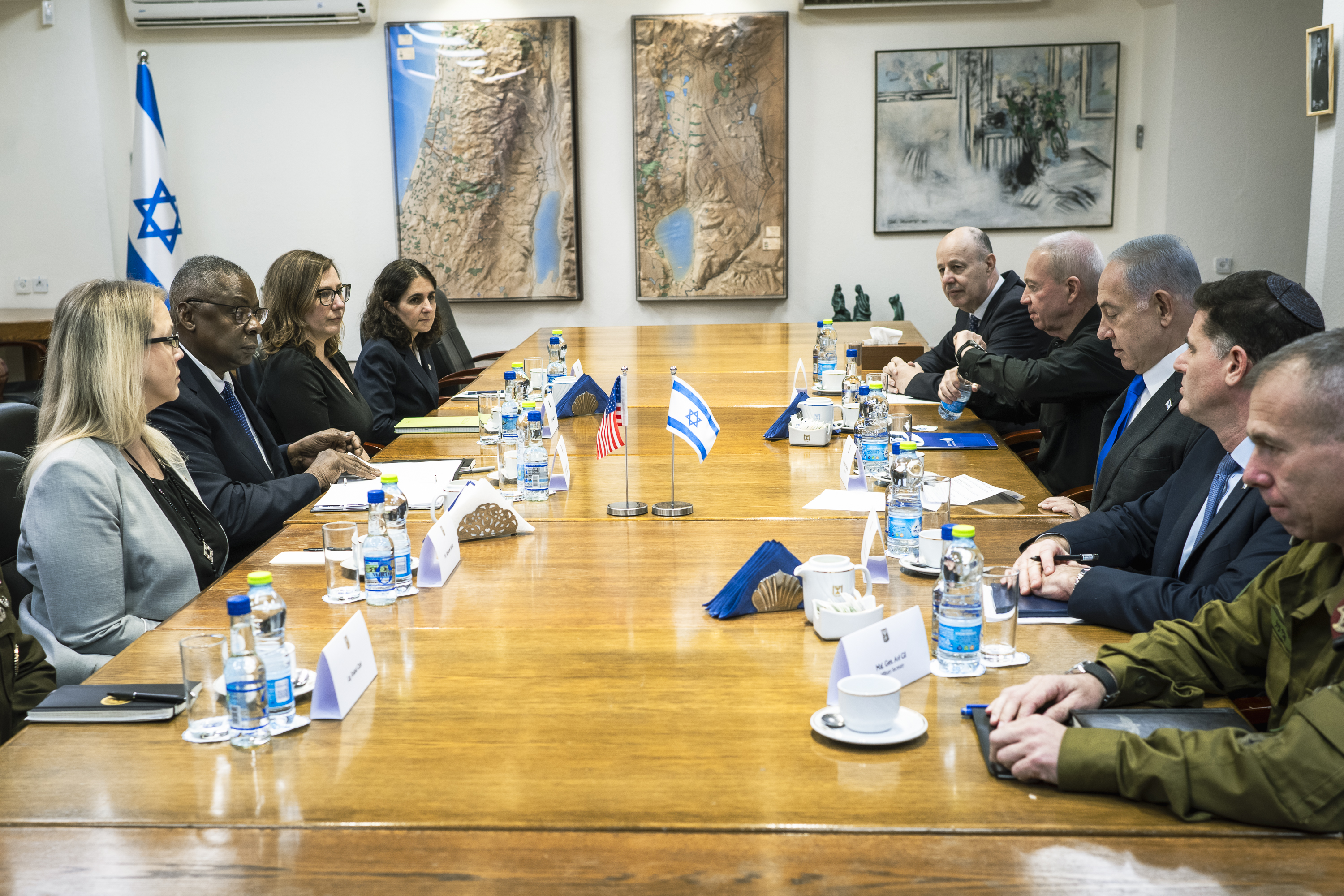
Israeli Prime Minister Benjamin Netanyahu and Minister of Defense Yoav Gallant with US Secretary of Defense Lloyd Austin in Tel Aviv, Israel, 13 October 2023

Amit Segal, chief political commentator for Israel's Channel 12, said that the conflict would test Benjamin Netanyahu's survival as prime minister, noting that past wars had toppled the governments of several of his predecessors such as that of Golda Meir following the 1973 Yom Kippur War, Menachem Begin following the 1982 Lebanon War, and Ehud Olmert following the 2006 Lebanon War. Prior to the formation of an emergency unity government on 11 October, Politico described the then-potential move as Netanyahu's opportunity to correct his course and save his political legacy. Citing the Israeli intelligence failure, which some observers attributed to the incumbent government focusing more on internal dissent, the judicial reform, and efforts to deepen Israel's occupation of the Palestinian territories, some commentators criticized Netanyahu for putting aside the PLO and propping up Hamas, and described him as a liability.

Political journalist Peter Beaumont described the attack as "an intelligence failure for the ages" on the part of the Israeli government. The Jewish News Syndicate deemed it a "failure of imagination". A BBC report on the intelligence failure noted that "it must have taken extraordinary levels of operational security by Hamas." US officials expressed shock at how Israeli intelligence appeared to be unaware of any preparations by Hamas. Israeli officials later anonymously reported to Axios that the IDF and Shin Bet had detected abnormal movements by Hamas the day before the attack, but decided to wait for additional intelligence before raising the military's alert level. They also did not inform political leaders of the intelligence reports.

Sources in Hamas and Israel's military establishment told Reuters the attack was the culmination of a years-long campaign by Hamas to deceive Israel into thinking that the group was primarily interested in economic and governance issues instead of fighting. An IDF colonel anonymously told Middle East Eye that intelligence units had detected Hamas training activities but misjudged their intent; they assessed these would be used in a series of separate attacks, rather than a large combined one.

Amir Avivi, former deputy commander of the IDF's Gaza Division, told the Financial Times it was "a failure that is no smaller than the Yom Kippur War." Yaakov Amidror, a former National Security Advisor to Netanyahu, said the attack proved their intelligence abilities in Gaza "were no good". An unnamed Egyptian intelligence official told the Associated Press that "[Egypt] warned them an explosion of the situation is coming, and very soon, and it would be big. But they underestimated such warnings." This story was corroborated by Michael McCaul, Chairman of the US House Foreign Relations Committee, who said the warnings were made three days before the attack.

On 11 October, Yedioth Ahronoth reported that Egypt's Director of the General Intelligence Directorate, Abbas Kamel, made a personal phone call to Netanyahu ten days before the initial attack warning that individuals in Gaza were expected to do "something unusual, a terrible operation." Former MI6 chief Sir Alex Younger voiced his opinion that Hamas fighters were able to carry out their attack due to "institutional complacency" in Israel. Netanyahu described the reports as "absolutely false" and "fake news".

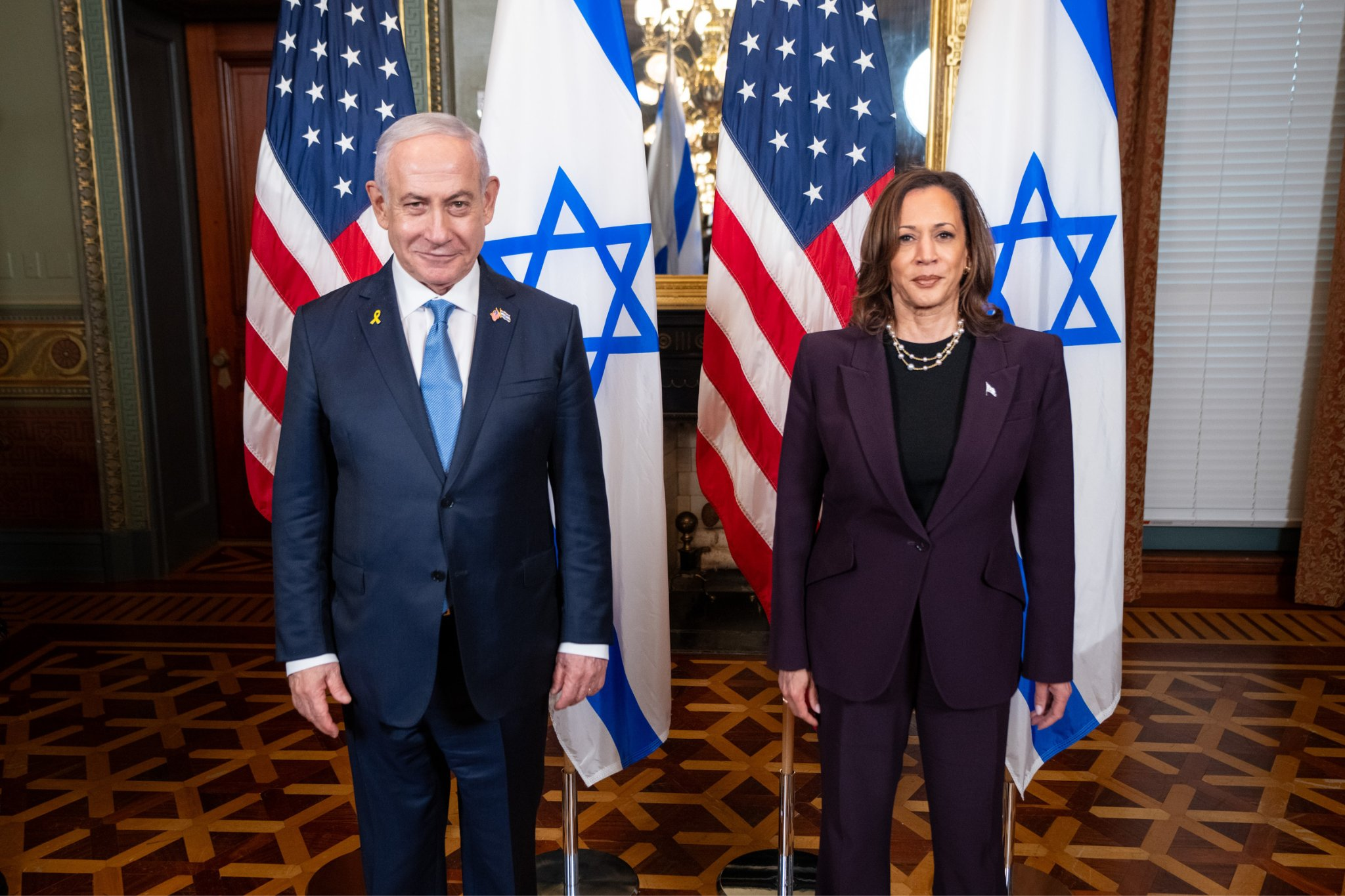
Israeli Prime Minister Benjamin Netanyahu with US Vice President Kamala Harris, 25 July 2024

The outbreak of war led to increased dislike of Netanyahu and the government from Israeli citizens due to a perceived failure of leadership on the issue, with increased calls for Netanyahu's resignation. A poll showed that 56% of Israelis believed that Netanyahu must resign after the conflict, with 86% of respondents holding the country's leadership responsible for the security failings that led to the surprise attack. By 14 November, a poll by Bar Ilan University estimated that less than 4% of Jewish Israelis trusted Netanyahu to give accurate information about the war. As of 12 October, Netanyahu had failed to apologize or take responsibility for his government's failure.

Netanyahu's government came under scrutiny, with Jordanian Foreign Minister Ayman Safadi stating, "The Israeli prime minister might be consciously provoking confrontations on other fronts, particularly with Lebanon and other parts of the region, to delay the political reckoning that he will have to face".

The inability of Israelis to return to settlements and homes in the north of the country due to the conflict with Hezbollah led to Antony Blinken stating that Israel had effectively "lost sovereignty in the northern quadrant of its country". In August 2024, former Israeli general Yitzhak Brik warned that Israel could collapse in a year if its wars in Gaza and Lebanon continued.

=== Effects on Israeli families ===
A report citing data from the Israeli Central Bureau of Statistics found that nearly half of couples whose spouses served in the Israeli army reserves reported that their family relationships had been seriously damaged during the war. These findings were confirmed by other parallel surveys and are considered one of the social consequences of the war in Israel.

=== Effects on children ===
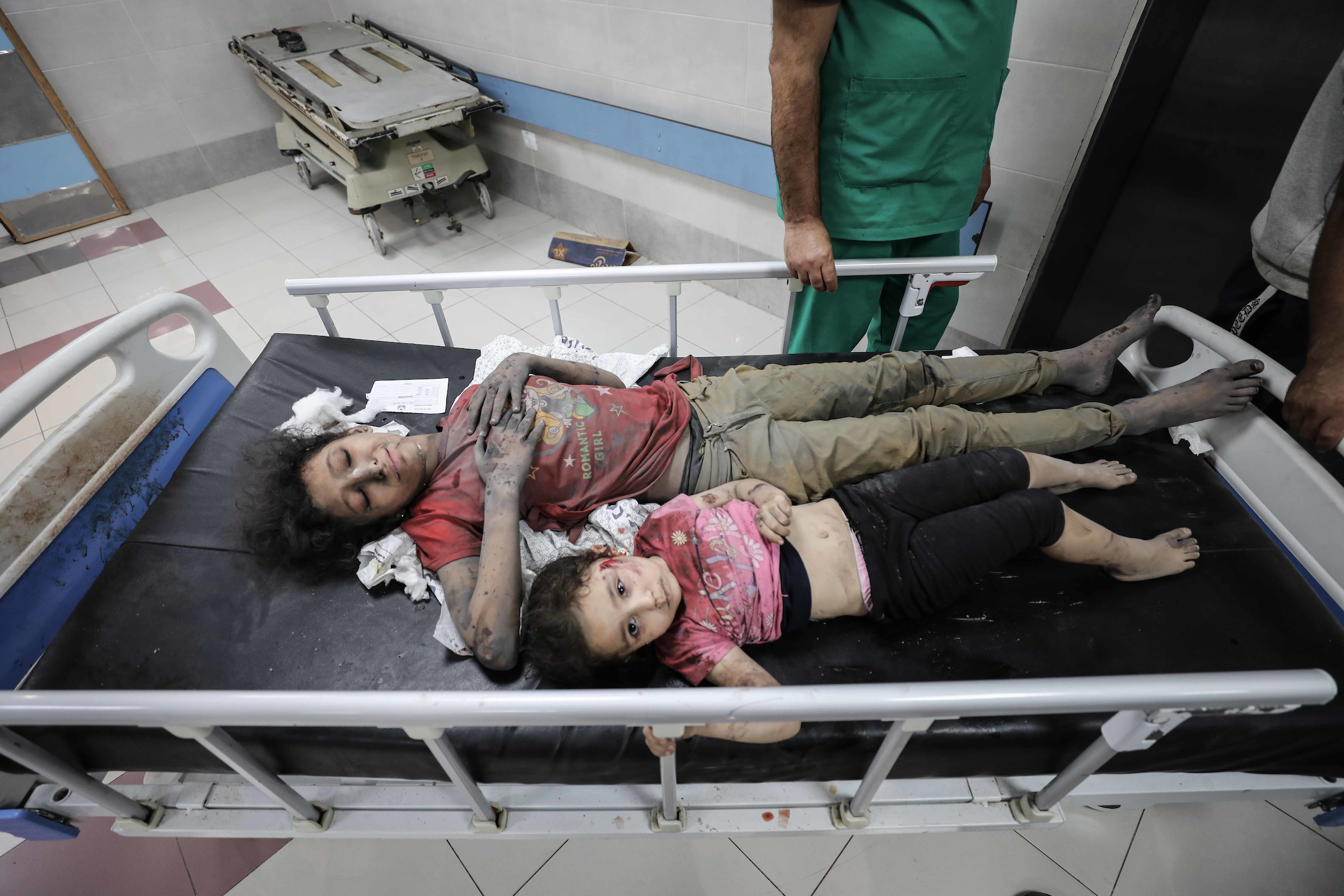
Wounded Palestinians wait for treatment at the overcrowded emergency ward of Al-Shifa hospital in Gaza City

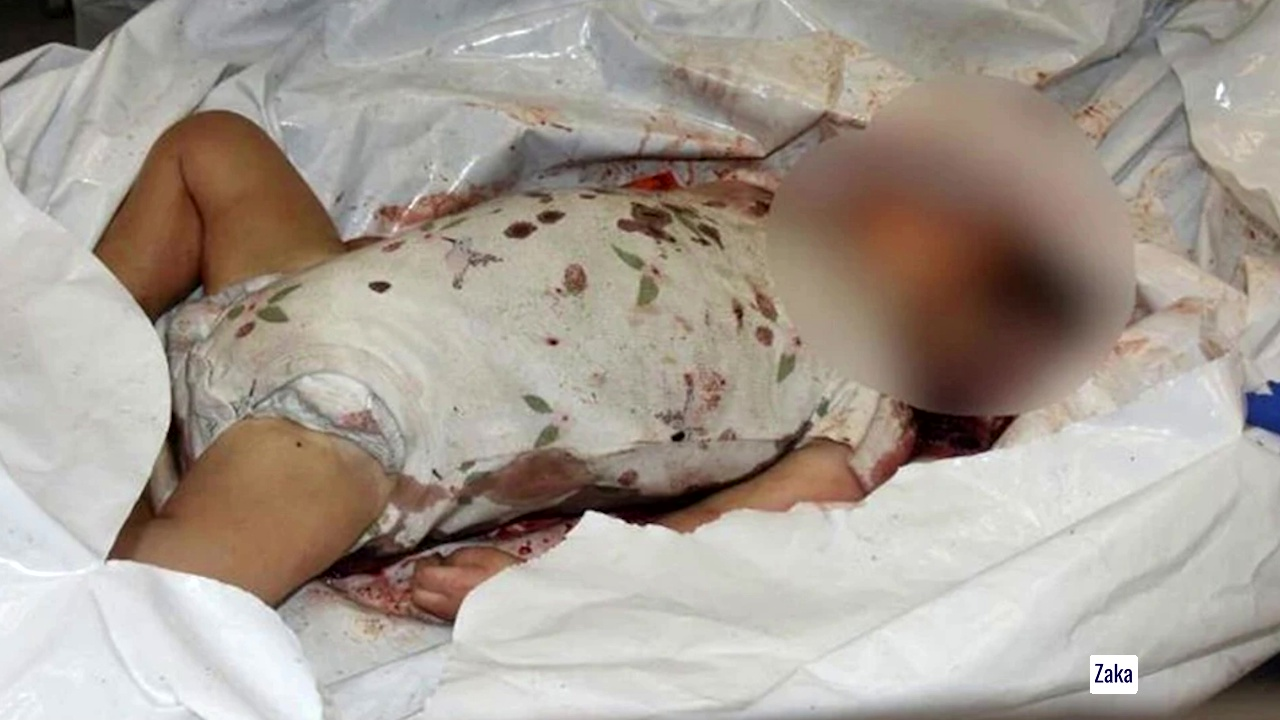
One of the victims of the Kfar Aza massacre

Children were disproportionately impacted by Israel's attack on Gaza. On 13 November, UNICEF stated more than 700,000 children in Gaza were displaced. The Palestine Red Crescent Society stated displaced children were suffering, due to power outages, lack of basic essentials, and "scenes of pain and fear." Catherine M. Russell, the executive director of UNICEF, toured Gaza on 15 November, stating many children were buried under rubble and lacking medical care.

Dr. Ahmed al-Fara, the head of pediatrics at Nasser Medical Complex in Khan Younis, stated due to the lack of clean water, he was witnessing the "most serious epidemic of gastroenteritis" among children he had ever seen. UNICEF spokesperson Toby Fricker stated, "There is no safe place for children anywhere across the strip right now." Save the Children reported serious signs of mental health issues among children in Gaza.

The children who endure the horrors of war do not emerge unharmed and often suffer severe psychological, emotional, and behavioral consequences. Among these consequences, some children exhibit signs of restlessness, regression, or even engage in violent behavior. During October, a higher number of children perished in Gaza compared to the combined total of children lost in all other conflicts annually since 2019. This alarming statistic prompted United Nations Secretary-General António Guterres to describe Gaza as a "graveyard for children."

By March 2024, over 800 schools in Gaza were bombed or destroyed.

38 children were killed during a Hamas-led attack on Israel on 7 October 2023.

=== Effect on demographics ===
In the aftermath of al-Aqsa Flood, nearly 500,000 Israelis left Israel while migration to Israel had declined 70% by November. From 2023 to 2026, more people emigrated from the country than immigrated to it.

Since the beginning of the war, nearly 2 million Palestinians have been displaced within the Gaza Strip. Over 40,000 Palestinians have been killed in the Israeli offensive in Gaza. Indirect Palestinian deaths are expected to be much higher due to the intensity of the conflict, destruction of health care infrastructure, lack of food, water, shelter, and safe places for civilians to flee, and reduction in UNRWA funding; the actual death toll in Gaza from both direct and indirect causes could be more than 186,000 according to a July 2024 estimate by Rasha Khatib, Martin McKee, and Salim Yusuf published as a letter to the editor in the British medical journal The Lancet.

== Diplomatic ==
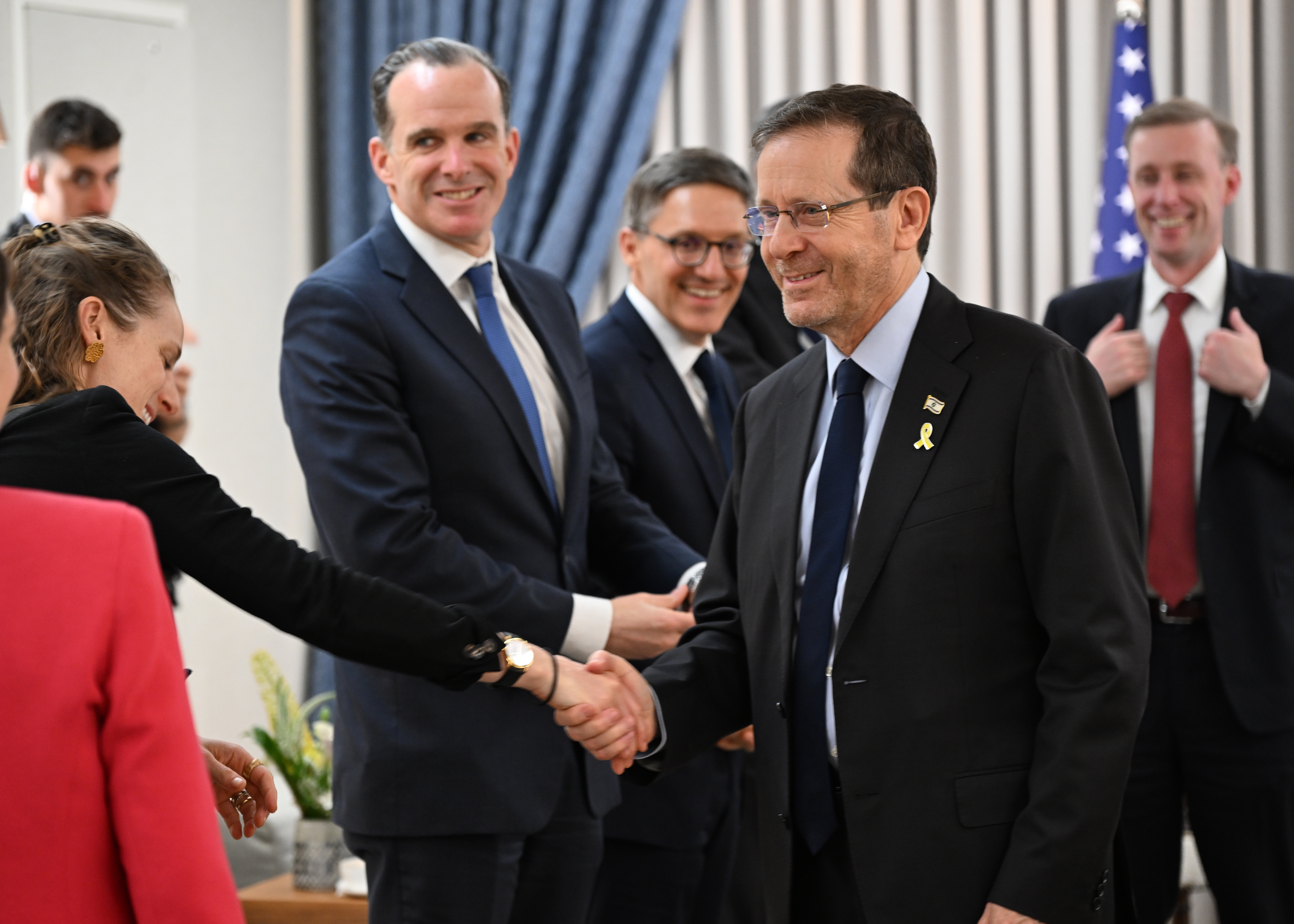
White House Middle East advisor Brett McGurk with Israeli President Isaac Herzog and Biden's National Security Adviser Jake Sullivan, 19 May 2024

The Gaza war sparked a major diplomatic crisis, with many countries around the world reacting strongly to the conflict that affected the momentum of regional relations. At least nine countries took the drastic step of recalling their ambassadors and cutting diplomatic ties with Israel.

In an interview with the Financial Times, former-Chairman of the US Joint Chiefs of Staff Mark Milley stated Israel was paying an "enormous" strategic cost for the war with its loss of international support. Thomas Friedman, writing in a New York Times op-ed, wrote, "I am seeing the increasingly rapid erosion of Israel's standing among friendly nations".

=== Severance and recall of diplomatic relations ===
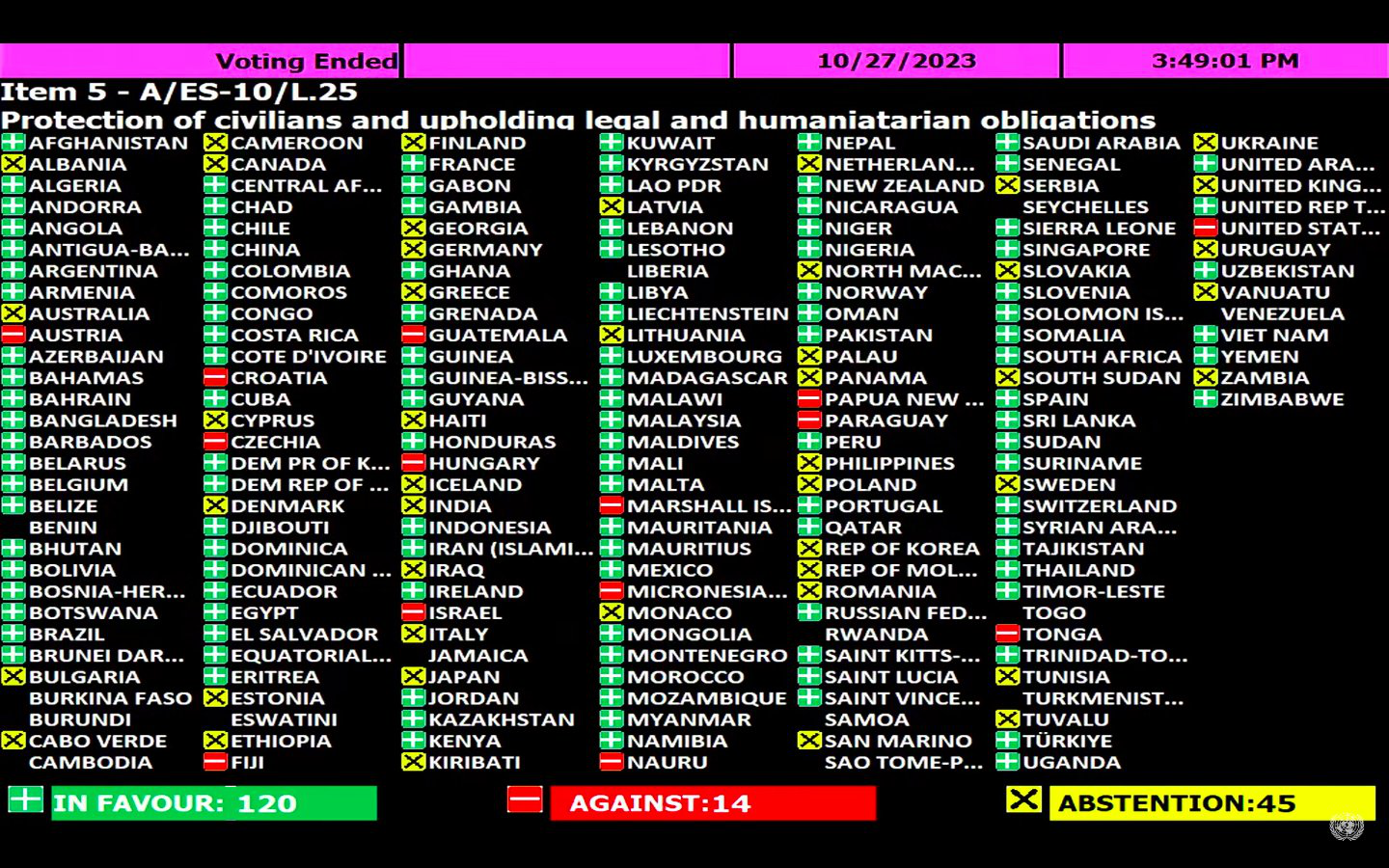
On 27 October, the United Nations General Assembly passed Resolution ES-10/21 calling for an "immediate and sustained" humanitarian truce and cessation of hostilities.

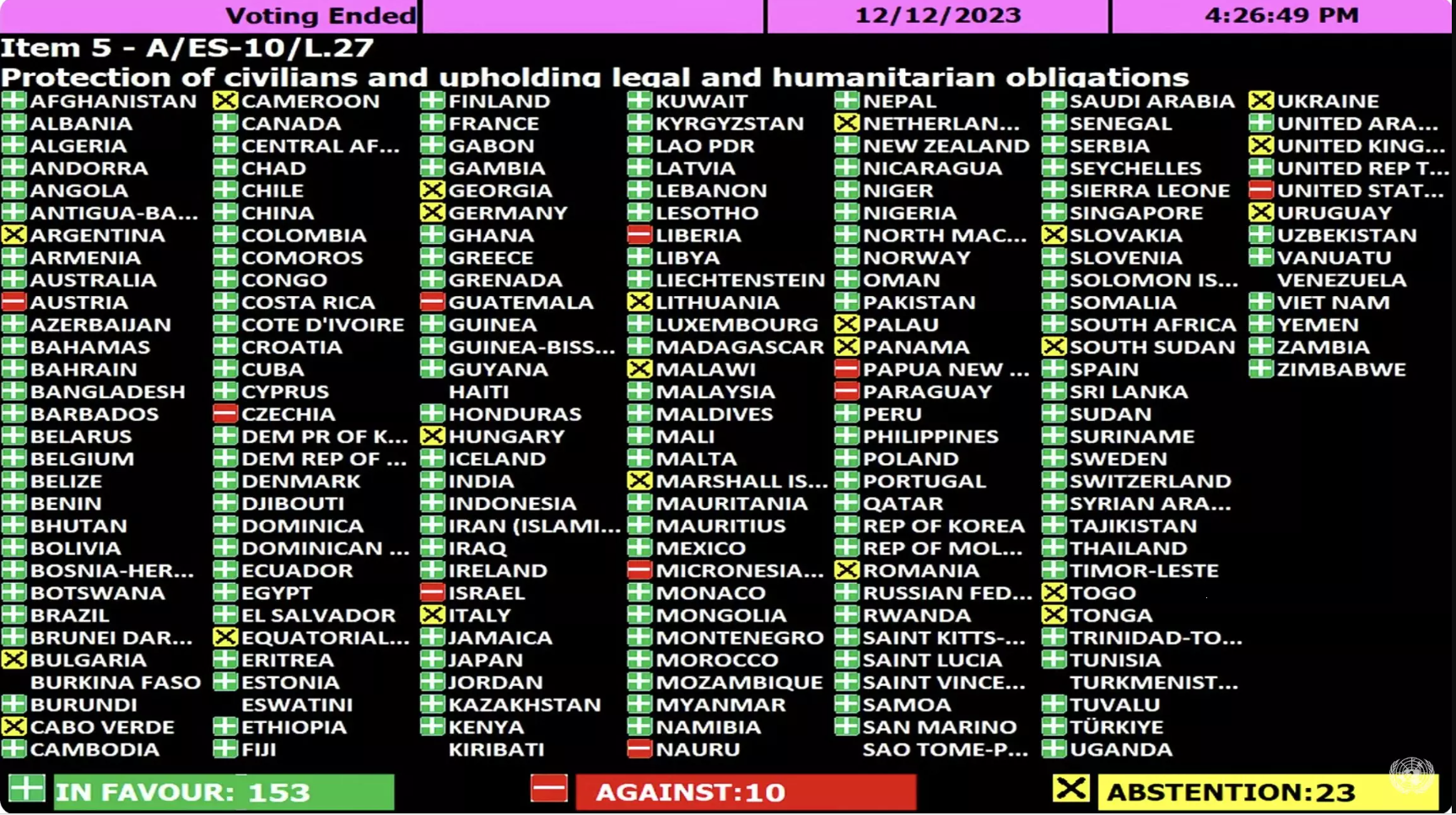
On 12 December 2023, the UN General Assembly passed Resolution ES-10/22 calling for an immediate ceasefire and the "immediate and unconditional" release of the hostages.

A number of countries have recalled their ambassadors to Israel or severed ties altogether; among: Jordan, Bahrain, Turkey, Colombia, Honduras, Chile, Belize, South Africa and Chad. The measures were taken in response to Israel's conflict with Hamas, citing humanitarian concerns about the escalating conflict.

==== Brazil ====
President Luiz Inácio Lula da Silva criticized Israel's actions in the Gaza Strip calling it "the insanity" of Prime Minister Benjamin Netanyahu.

==== Bolivia ====
On the afternoon of Israel's 31 October airstrike on the Jabalia refugee camp, Bolivia severed all diplomatic ties with Israel, attributing its decision to alleged war crimes and human rights violations in the Gaza Strip.

==== Jordan ====
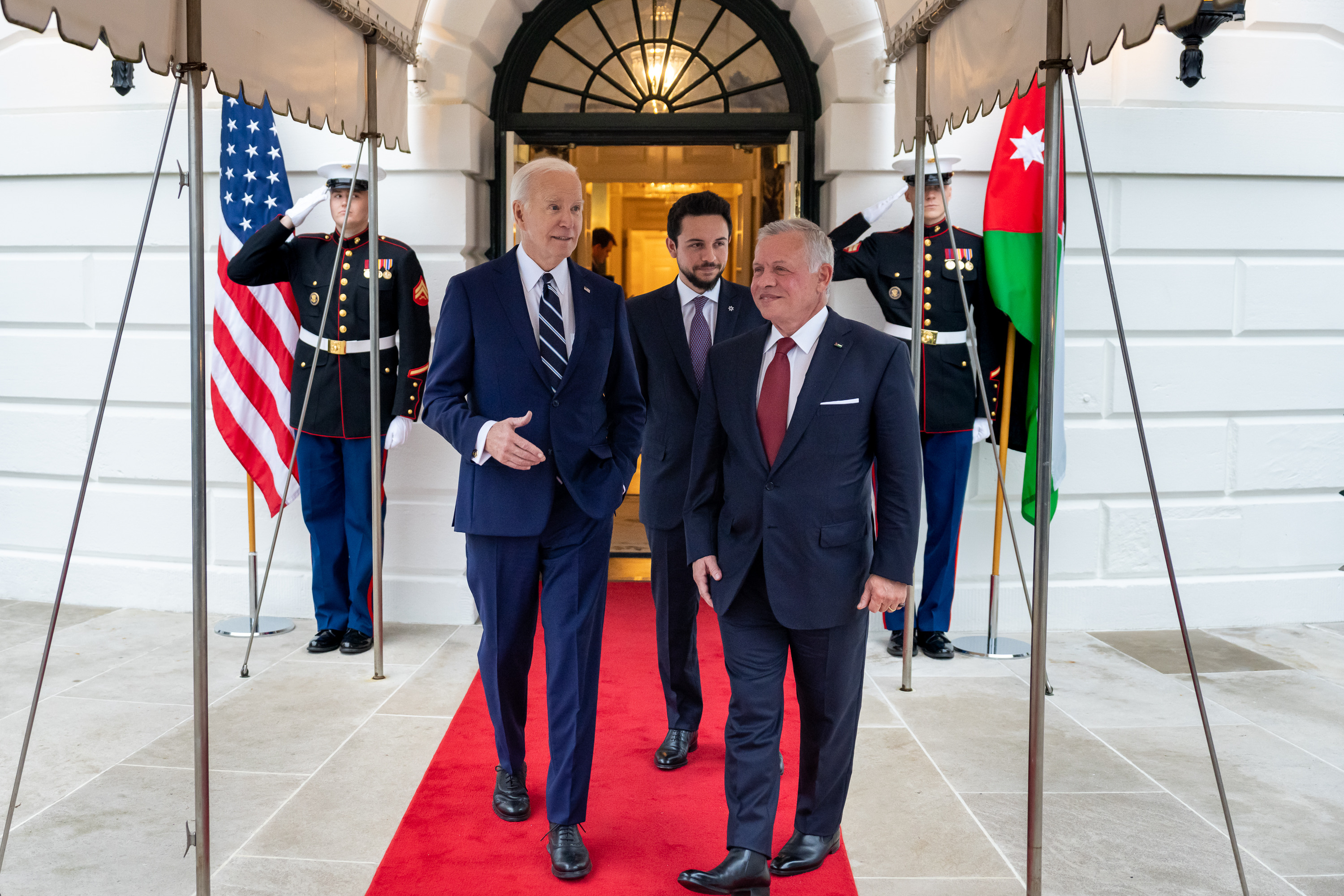
King Abdullah II of Jordan and Crown Prince Hussein with US President Joe Biden in February 2024

Jordan, a major US ally in the Middle East, recalled its ambassador on 1 November, as an "expression of Jordan's position of rejection and condemnation of the raging Israeli war on Gaza, which is killing innocent people and causing an unprecedented humanitarian catastrophe." Likewise, Jordan added that the ambassador of Israel who had departed Amman (the capital city) following Hamas' attack, will not be permitted to return.

In November 2023, the prime minister of Jordan said that Jordan was considering all available options in its response to the Israeli aggression on Gaza and its subsequent consequences. He argued that Israel's blockade of the heavily populated Gaza Strip could not be justified as self-defense, and criticised the indiscriminate Israeli assault, which had included safe zones and ambulances in its targets.

==== Bahrain ====
Bahrain's National Assembly suspended diplomatic and economic relations on 2 November, citing a "solid and historical stance that supports the Palestinian cause and the legitimate rights of the Palestinian people." Israel said they had no prior knowledge of the decision.

==== Turkey ====
Turkey recalled its ambassador to Israel over the humanitarian crisis caused by Israel's continued attacks on civilians in Gaza on 4 November. Turkish President Recep Tayyip Erdoğan has announced that he is cutting off all contact with Israeli Prime Minister Benjamin Netanyahu.

==== Malaysia ====
Malaysia has expressed its concern regarding the recent escalation in the Middle East through a statement issued by the Foreign Ministry. The statement attributes the root cause of the situation to the prolonged illegal occupation, blockade, sufferings, desecration of Al-Aqsa, and the politics of dispossession by Israel as the occupier. Malaysia calls for a return to the pre-1967 border and urges the United Nations Security Council to demand an end to the violence while emphasizing the importance of respecting and protecting the lives of innocent civilians. Prime Minister Anwar Ibrahim, despite alleged pressure from Western nations, has chosen not to condemn Hamas, highlighting the longstanding relationship between Malaysia and the group. Furthermore, Malaysia voted against condemning Hamas at the United Nations. In a recent development, Malaysia has announced a ban on Israeli-owned and Israeli-flagged ships, as well as those headed for Israel, from docking at Malaysian ports.

==== Other countries ====
Several South American countries filed diplomatic protests against Israel in response to the conflict with Hamas.

== Economic ==
=== Global economy ===
The conflict has the potential to plunge the global economy into recession. War could have significant repercussions on Europe's economic landscape, impacting it through reduced regional commerce, stricter financial regulations, escalated energy costs, and diminished consumer assurance. Goldman Sachs underscored that the most crucial and potentially impactful method that strain could permeate the European economy was via the petroleum and natural gas markets.

The World Bank warned that the price of oil could rise to $150 a barrel if the war spreads beyond the Gaza Strip to other countries in the oil-rich region. In a recent report, the World Bank issued a concerning warning on 30 October regarding the Israel–Gaza conflict. They stated that this conflict has the potential to cause a significant global economic shock. One of the potential consequences could be a drastic increase in oil prices, with projections suggesting that it could reach as high as one hundred and fifty dollars per barrel. This would have severe implications for the global economy, leading to higher food prices and potentially causing millions of people to go hungry. The report draws parallels to the 1973 war, during which Arab members of OPEC, led by Saudi Arabia, imposed an oil embargo on the United States in response to their support for Israel.

=== Israel ===
Israel's treasury minister said the daily direct cost of the Gaza war to her country is about $246 million.

It has been estimated that if the war went on for eight to twelve months, the cost of the war to the Israeli economy would be more than $50 billion, or close to 10% of GDP, according to Calcalist, citing early Ministry of Finance figures. The estimates assume the conflict is limited to Gaza, without further escalation with other parties, and relies on the 350,000 drafted reservists returning to work soon.

In November, the Bank of Israel projected that the war would incur a total expense of approximately US$53 billion until 2025. This estimation was based on forecasts of increased defense and other expenditures, coupled with a decline in tax revenue. The magnitude of military activity witnessed by Israel in terms of duration, intensity, and cost has not been observed in recent times. The 2014 Gaza War, also known as Operation Protective Edge by the Israel Defense Forces (IDF), lasted for over a month and had a significant impact on the Israeli economy. It resulted in an estimated loss of ILS7 billion (US$1.96 billion), excluding the expenses of reservist pay and air force weaponry. To restore financial stability, the government implemented a budget cut of ILS2 billion (US$559 million) across all ministries, except defense.

=== Palestine ===
In December 2023, the World Bank reported that around 85% of workers in Gaza were unemployed and that the region was functioning at 16% of its productive capability, resulting in what the World Bank characterized as a "severe economic downturn".

Nasri Abu Jaish, the Palestinian Minister of Labor, stated unemployment in Gaza had risen from 47 percent up to 90 percent, while unemployment in the West Bank was at 25 percent. The UN Conference on Trade and Development reported a 24 percent contraction in gross domestic product in Gaza, with pre-war GDP levels not estimated to be restored until 2092, concluding, "The main takeaway from the report is that the level of destruction that we're witnessing in Gaza is unprecedented." The conference stated it would take billions of dollars and decades to rebuild Gaza. In February 2024, Kristalina Georgieva, the chief of the International Monetary Fund, stated the war had decimated the economies of the West Bank and Gaza. The chair of UNCTAD stated Gaza would need its own Marshall Plan to rebuild, which could cost up to US$50 billion.

=== Egypt ===
Egypt, a nation grappling with a vulnerable economy, confronts further obstacles as a result of the ongoing conflict near the Gaza Strip. This confrontation possesses the capacity to disrupt the tourism sector and impede the importation of natural gas, thereby placing strain on Egypt's economy. The war in Palestine (Gaza), unfolding along Egypt's border with the Sinai Peninsula, coincides with Russia's aggression towards Ukraine and the global impact of the coronavirus pandemic, both of which have laid bare the vulnerabilities of Egypt's economy.

The recent events in Gaza and the crisis in the Red Sea region are expected to negatively affect the revenue generated from tourism. S&P Global Ratings predicts a decline of 10 to 30 percent in Egypt's tourism revenues compared to the previous year, potentially leading to a loss of 4 to 11 percent in foreign exchange reserves and a decrease in GDP. Since November, Egypt has been facing the economic repercussions of Houthi-led missile and drone attacks on commercial vessels in the Red Sea, which were carried out in response to Israel's conflict with Gaza. As a result, many shipping companies have chosen to redirect their vessels around the Cape of Good Hope, bypassing the shortest trade route connecting Asia to Europe through the Suez Canal. This has had a significant impact on Egypt's revenue from the Suez Canal, which amounted to $9.4 billion in the 2022–23 fiscal year. However, in the first 11 days of this year, the revenue from the Suez Canal has experienced a drastic decline of 40 percent compared to the same period in the previous year.

=== China ===
==== Israeli claims of Chinese sanctions ====
Israel's high-tech factories reported on 25 December that they had been having trouble with electronic imports from China due to recent bureaucratic obstacles, leading to higher import costs and delayed delivery times. Israeli officials also reported that China had refused to send workers to their country during the war against the backdrop of a worker shortage in Israel's construction and farming sectors. China's actions were described as a de facto sanction.

=== Lebanon ===
The olive trade in southern Lebanon, which is the main source of income for many, was halted as farmers stopped their harvests in fear of the active shelling. According to the Agriculture Minister Abbas Hajj Hassan, 40,000 olive trees were burned down by fires caused by IDF shelling.

The Institute of International Finance predicted that Lebanon's GDP could decline by one percent by the end of the year and by 30 percent in 2024 in the event of further spillover of the war.

=== Divestment, sanctions, and boycotts ===
==== Boycotts of Western companies ====
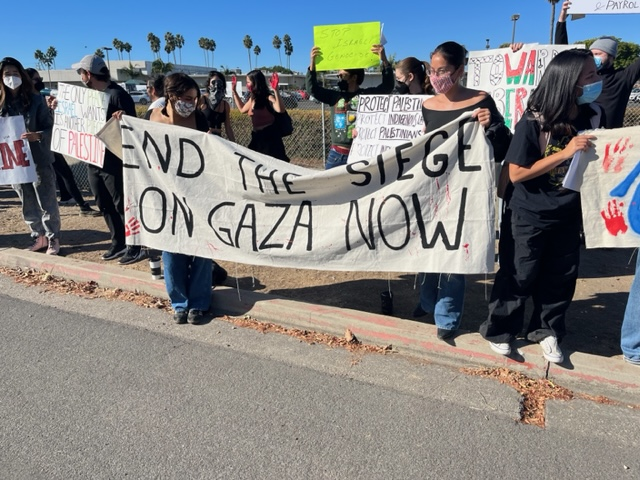
Demonstration outside Raytheon's office in Goleta, California to protest the military contractor's supply of weapons to Israel, 9 November 2023

People in some Muslim countries have boycotted Western businesses, especially American ones such as Starbucks, McDonald's and Coca-Cola, reflecting anger at Western governments' support for Israel.

Campaigners in Derry, Northern Ireland persuaded O'Neills to remove Puma products because of the sports brand's sponsoring of the Israeli Football Association. Starbucks was targeted in Keighley, West Yorkshire, with protesters smashing the shop's windows, following the corporation's decision to sue the Starbuck Workers United union after the labour organisation posted on social media support for Palestine. On 6 March, Chile announced it was blocking Israeli firms from participating in Santiago's International Air and Space Fair. The City Council of Brussels banned public procurement of products made in illegal Israel settlements.

Direct action was taken at arms factories in the United States and the United Kingdom that supplied arms to Israel, such as Lockheed Martin, General Dynamics, Textron, Boeing, Raytheon Technologies and Northrop Grumman. For instance, on 10 November 2023, trade unionists in Rochester, Kent, blocked the entrances to a BAE Systems factory, stating the facility manufactured military aircraft components used to bomb Gaza; and on 16 November, Palestine Action occupied a Leonardo factory in Southampton, stopping production. ZIM was barred from entering ports in Malaysia.

==== Academic boycott ====
According to the Guardian, a growing number of universities, academic institutions and scholarly bodies around the world are cutting links with Israeli academia amid claims that it is complicit in the Israeli government's actions towards Palestinians.

==== Sanctions ====
On 30 January United States President Joe Biden signed an executive order which allowed the US to impose sanctions on Israeli settlers, with potential inclusion of Israeli politicians and government officials that were found to be involved with violent attack against Palestinians. Biden had earlier ordered the secretaries of state and treasury to prepare for the potential sanctions against Israeli individuals or entities that were involved in the violence against Palestinians in the West Bank. Israeli Finance Minister Bezalel Smotrich responded to Biden's order, saying it was based on "an antisemitic lie". Smotrich later stated, "We will not stand aside in the face of this injustice" and called for settlements to be "entrenched." Israel's National Security Minister Itamar Ben-Gvir praised the sanctioned settlers, calling them "heroic". Netanyahu criticized the sanctions and called them unnecessary. Following the U.S. sanctions, online fundraisers collected hundreds of thousands for the settlers. In March 2024, the U.S. sanctioned three additional settlers and two settler outposts.

On 4 February 2024, Canadian foreign minister Melanie Joly stated that her government was preparing to issue sanctions against extremist settlers. On 16 May, Canada sanctioned four West Bank settlers. On 27 June 2024, Canada sanctioned another seven settlers. The UK also issued sanctions on the four settlers and a second round of sanctions in May 2024. On 13 February, France stated that it was imposing sanctions on 28 settlers who have used violence against Palestinians in the West Bank. Spanish Foreign Minister José Manuel Albares said that Spain would implement settler sanctions if the European Union does not come to an agreement. Spain later announced sanctions on 12 violent Israeli settlers. On 18 March, the EU unanimously agreed to sanction violent Israeli settlers.

In July 2024, the U.S. announced sanctions against three Israeli individuals, four settler outposts, and a violent extremist organization in the West Bank. Soon after, the EU announced sanctions on five Israeli individuals and three for "serious and systematic human rights abuses".

In April 2024, media reports indicated the United States was planning to sanction the Netzah Yehuda Battalion for alleged human rights abuses. US officials were also reportedly considering sanctions against additional Israeli military and police units. In late April 2024, the US had reportedly decided the units would remain eligible for US military aid. In a statement, the US Department of State stated five Israeli army units had been found responsible for "gross violations of human rights" prior to 7 October, but that they would remain eligible for military aid.

==== Divestments ====
In March 2024, the Norwegian Sovereign Wealth Fund, the largest sovereign wealth fund in the world, announced that its ethics council was conducting an investigation into whether companies were selling weapons to Israel that were being used in Gaza. The fund's ethical guidelines require it to divest from companies selling to states violating humanitarian law. Svein Richard Brandtzæg stated, "We are looking at this because of the seriousness of the breach of the norms that we see".

== Military ==
Ismail Haniyeh, the leader of Hamas, speculated the war would spread to Jerusalem and the West Bank. Hashem Safieddine, Head of Hezbollah's Executive Council, threatened to join the conflict. Max Abrahms, a political scientist at Northeastern University, opined that the conflict could escalate into a war between Israel and Iran. During a meeting with UN diplomat Tor Wennesland on 14 October, Iranian foreign minister Hossein Amir-Abdollahian asserted that Iran will intervene in the war if Israel continues its military operations or launches a ground invasion against Gaza.

On 16 October 2023, Iran threatened "pre-emptive" attacks against Israel, indicating further region-wide escalation of the war. Iranian foreign minister stated: "The possibility of pre-emptive action by the resistance front is expected in the coming hours... All options are open and we cannot be indifferent to the war crimes committed against the people of Gaza."

The conflict between Israel and Hamas is having repercussions in Europe, with an increase in threats and physical assaults against minority communities throughout the continent. Additionally, it is believed that the recent terrorist attack in Paris was partially motivated by the situation in Gaza.

In July 2024, Turkish president Tayyip Erdogan stated he would not support further NATO cooperation with the Israeli military.

=== Arms transfers and embargoes ===
As a result of the war, Western arms transfers came under increasing public scrutiny. Following the International Court of Justice's finding in South Africa v. Israel that Palestinians had plausible claims to protection from genocide in Gaza, multiple organizations called for an end to arms transfers. Democracy for the Arab World Now stated, "The US can’t and should not continue its arms transfers with Israel now." An additional sixteen humanitarian organizations—including Oxfam, Save the Children, Norwegian Refugee Council, and Amnesty International—also urged for an immediate halt to these transfers. Human Rights Watch criticized Western nations' contradictory approach, highlighting that while they tried to alleviate the "dire humanitarian need" in Gaza, they continued supplying weapons that exacerbated the situation. Amnesty International cited continued weapons transfers to Israel as a "stark example" of the failure of states to comply with the Arms Trade Treaty. The Palestinian diplomat to the United Nations echoed these calls, urging a "halt the transfer of the weaponry it is using to slaughter Palestinian children, women, and men."

Political leaders and diplomats from various countries reinforced these sentiments. US President Joe Biden's remarks that Israel's actions in Gaza were "over the top" prompted EU foreign policy chief Josep Borrell to state, "If you believe that too many people are being killed, maybe you should provide less arms." Jordanian Foreign Minister Ayman Safadi added, “Weapons must stop flowing to Israel. Israel must be forced to end this catastrophe. This is what international law, what human values, demand." French President Emmanuel Macron advocated for halting weapons transfers, emphasizing the need to “return to a political solution” and stop arming the conflict in Gaza. The Elders called for suspending arms transfers to Israel, urging states to respond to systematic violations of international humanitarian law in Gaza and the occupied Palestinian territories.

Specific actions were taken by several governments and organizations. In early January 2024, Canadian officials paused applications to export nonlethal military equipment to Israel, such as night vision goggles, due to concerns about their potential use in human rights violations. On 5 February 2024, the aviation unit of Itochu ended its partnership with Elbit Systems, citing the ICJ's provisional order to prevent acts of genocide. The following day, the Government of Wallonia in Belgium temporarily suspended two ammunition export licenses to Israel. The Netherlands halted the export of F-35 jet parts on 12 February 2024. In response to the Flour massacre on 29 February 2024, Colombian President Gustavo Petro announced the suspension of all arms purchases from Israel. In April 2024, Foreign Minister Melanie Joly announced that Canada would cease arms exports to Israel. In May 2024, Spain prevented a ship carrying weapons from docking, and pledged a consistent policy against any Israeli arms shipments arriving in Spanish ports. In October 2024, Spain announced it was suspending all existing weapons purchase contracts with Israel. Italian Prime Minister Giorgia Meloni announced that Italy had "immediately suspended all new export licenses" of weapons to Israel following the start of Israeli operations in Gaza. The Australian Department of Defence stated that it would review all 66 military export permits to Israel to determine how the permits fit within Australia's human rights obligations.

The United States, United Kingdom, and Germany have resisted calls to implement arms embargoes. Scotland's First Minister Humza Yousaf criticized the UK's stance, warning that by not stopping arms sales, the UK risked complicity in civilian deaths. The UK also faced pressure from the Global Legal Action Network, which urged parliament to "respect the rule of law and end unlawful arms exports to Israel now." UK arms transfer approvals to Israel dropped by 95% at the start of the war, and the UK ultimately implemented a limited weapons embargo, restricting 30 out of 350 authorized weapons transfers to Israel. In Germany, Chancellor Olaf Scholz stated in October 2024 that "there will always be further deliveries. Israel can rely on that". U.S. diplomat Lise Grande reportedly stated Israel was too close an ally to limit weapons transfers.

== International relations ==
=== Israeli–Saudi Arabian normalization ===
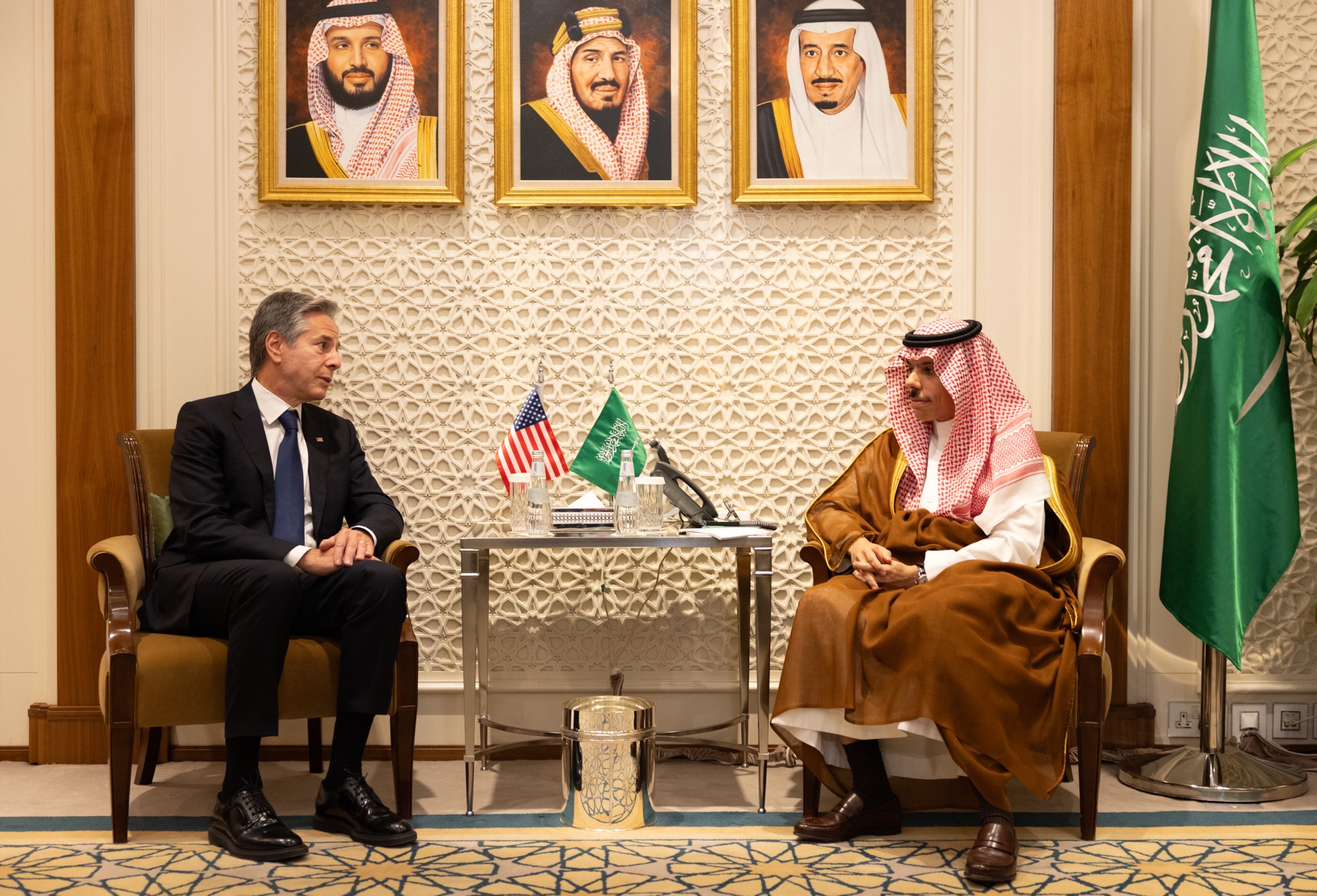
Saudi Foreign Minister Faisal bin Farhan Al Saud with US Secretary of State Antony Blinken in Riyadh, Saudi Arabia, 14 October 2023

In an analysis by The Times of Israel, the newspaper wrote that "Hamas has violently shifted the world's eyes back to the Palestinians and dealt a severe blow to the momentum for securing a landmark US-brokered deal between Israel and Saudi Arabia." The New York Times reported that the prospects of Israeli and Saudi normalization appeared dimmer, citing Saudi Arabia's statement that the country had repeatedly warned "of the dangers of the explosion of the situation as a result of the continued occupation, the deprivation of the Palestinian people and their legitimate rights and the repetition of systemic provocations against its sanctities."

Andreas Kluth wrote in his Bloomberg News column that Hamas "torched Biden's deal to remake the Middle East", arguing that the deal that was being discussed between Saudi Arabia, Israel and the United States would have left Palestinians in the cold, so the group decided to "blow the whole thing up." He added that, viewed from Gaza, things were only going to get worse, considering that Netanyahu's coalition partners opposed a two-state solution for the conflict. He suggested they would prefer to annex the entirety of the West Bank, even at the expense of turning Israel into an apartheid state, something critics have long claimed as Israel's goal.

Speculation arose that Iran was trying to sabotage relations between Israel and Saudi Arabia, with former head of research for Shin Bet Neomi Neumann saying the attack could have been timed in part due to Iran's hopes to scuttle efforts to normalize relations between Israel and its Sunni rival. On 9 October, Iranian Foreign Ministry spokesperson Nasser Kanaani denied claims of Tehran's involvement in Hamas's attack. On 12 October, Saudi Crown Prince Mohammed bin Salman discussed the Israel–Gaza situation with Iranian President Ebrahim Raisi. On 13 October, Saudi Arabia criticized Israel for the displacement of Palestinians from Gaza and the attacks on "defenceless civilians". On 14 October, Saudi Arabia suspended talks on the possible normalization of relations with Israel. On 27 October, Saudi Arabia warned the United States that an invasion of Gaza by Israel would be "catastrophic for the Middle East". On 21 January 2024, Saudi FM Faisal bin Farhan Al Saud stated there would be no normalization deal without a path to a Palestinian state. On 28 February, Israeli cabinet minister Eli Cohen stated there would be no normalization deal if it meant the creation of a Palestinian state.

=== Recognition of Palestine ===
In response to the conflict, Spanish Foreign Minister José Manuel Albares stated Spain was in favor of recognizing the State of Palestine within a short-term timeframe. Belgium's Minister of Development Cooperation Caroline Gennez stated Belgium was also considering recognizing the state of Palestine. On 19 January, Netanyahu stated there was no post-war scenario that would lead to a Palestinian state. In response, UK opposition leader Keir Starmer stated, "Palestinian statehood is not in the gift of a neighbour. It is the inalienable right of the Palestinian people." On 21 January, Netanyahu stated, "I will not compromise on full Israeli security control over the entire area in the west of Jordan—and this is contrary to a Palestinian state." The French foreign minister stated France would "remain faithful" to the creation of a Palestinian state. António Guterres stated, "The right of the Palestinian people to build their own state must be recognised by all". The EU reportedly sought to impose "consequences" on Israel for its opposition to Palestinian statehood.

The Saudi Foreign Minister Prince Faisal bin Farhan Al Saud stated on 22 January 2024 there would be no normalization deal with Israel until there was a realistic path toward a Palestinian state. Ayman Safadi stated Israel is "defying the whole international community and it is about time the world took a stand." Josep Borrell and Annalena Baerbock stated they were working toward a two-state solution, calling it the "only solution". Separately, Borrell stated two days later, "From now on I will not talk about the peace process, but I want a two-state-solution process". Malaysian foreign minister Mohamad Hasan announced he would introduce a UN resolution to admit Palestine as a full member state. On 30 January, David Cameron stated the UK and its allies were laying out plans for "recognising a Palestinian state".

Lana Zaki Nusseibeh, the UN representative of the United Arab Emirates, stated, "We cannot keep managing this conflict, we have to resolve it which means two states... There must be an irreversible progression towards a two-state solution." Gershon Baskin, a former Israeli peace negotiator, stated, "Let's face it, 139 countries have already recognised Palestine. But the rich countries have not, and it's time they do it." Azali Assoumani, the chair of the African Union, stated the Palestinian people have the right to their own state with East Jerusalem as its capital. On 21 March 2024, the US Secretary of State said that the US post-war vision included a "state for Palestinians and security guarantees for Israelis". In April 2024, Jamaica and Barbados both stated they were recognizing the State of Palestine. A senior Hamas official told the Associated Press that the organization would agree to a five-year truce in exchange for recognition of a Palestinian state.

In May 2024, the Bahamas and Trinidad and Tobago announced their formal recognition of Palestine. On 28 May 2024, Ireland, Norway and Spain jointly formally recognized Palestine, calling for other European countries to follow suit in order to achieve a diplomatic solution to the conflict. Slovenia stated it had begun the process of formal recognition, which its parliament voted to approve on 4 June 2024. Armenia's foreign ministry released a statement on 21 June confirming that the country had formally recognized Palestine. The UN General Assembly voted to grant the State of Palestine additional rights and privileges, and called on the Security Council to support its bid for full membership.

In September 2025, the United Kingdom, France, Canada, Australia and several other European countries jointly recognized Palestine as part of an initiative at the eightieth session of the United Nations General Assembly. Leaders of these countries had previously announced plans to do so to reinvigorate support for a two-state solution and in response to the humanitarian crisis in Gaza as a result of Israel's conduct during the war. Government officials from Israel and the United States publicly accused the countries of "rewarding" Hamas and "fueling" antisemitism.

=== War crimes, genocide and lawsuits ===
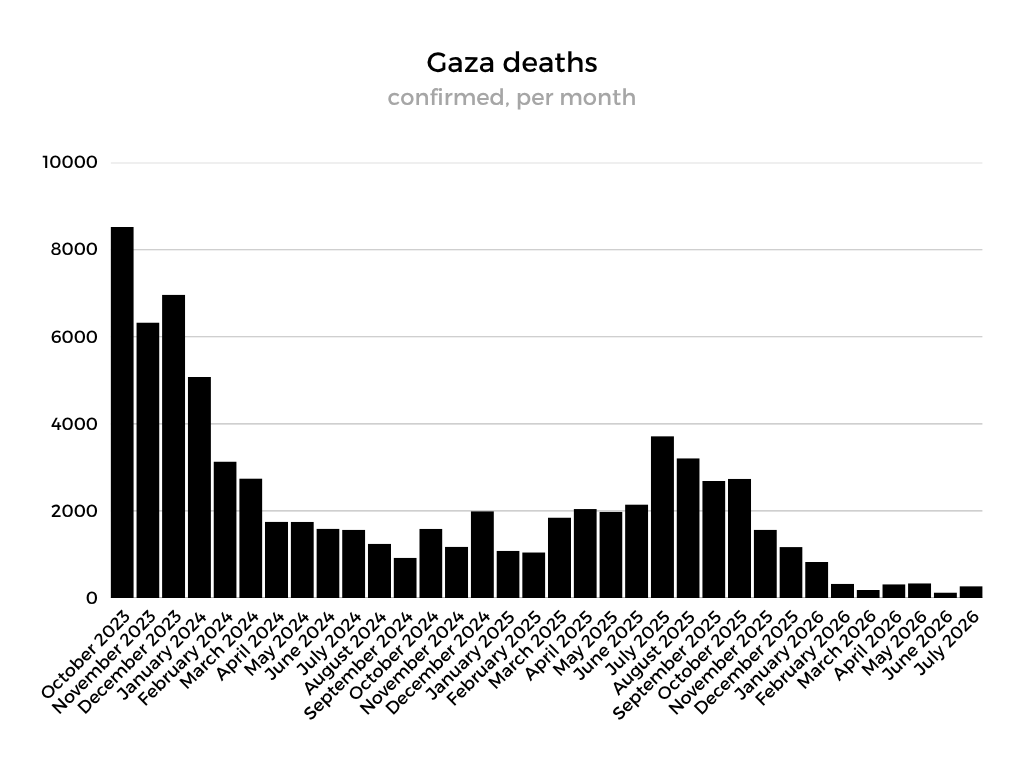
Gaza war deaths by month

Both Israel and Hamas were accused by international organizations and governments of committing war crimes, genocide and crimes against humanity. South Africa brought Israel to the International Court of Justice on charges of intent to commit genocide. Analysts, such as Al Jazeera senior political analyst Marwan Bishara, commented that the impact of such lawsuits on international relations would be limited, stating, "The International Court of Justice might come up with some ruling, but will this ruling ever be implemented in the presence of the United States and the United Kingdom?"

A Doctors Without Borders video shared by Amnesty International head Agnès Callamard stated, "This brutal annihilation of an entire populations health system stretches beyond what humanitarian aid can fix." On 4 December, Red Cross president Mirjana Spoljaric Egger visited the Gaza Strip, stating, "The things I saw there are beyond anything that anyone should be in a position to describe." On 10 December 2023, Bushra Khalidi, an expert with Oxfam, stated the situation was no longer "just a catastrophe, it's apocalyptic." In March 2024, the EU's top diplomat Josep Borrell stated Gaza had become a "graveyard for many of the most important principles of humanitarian law".

=== Israel's global standing ===
As a result of Israel's actions in Gaza, analysts described a diminishment in Israel's international standing. In December 2023, Israel was described as increasingly isolated amid growing global calls for a ceasefire. The same month, US President Biden stated Israel was losing international support over how it was conducting the war. In March 2024, Australia's Foreign Minister Penny Wong, stated, "Unless Israel changes its course it will continue to lose support." In a speech, the US Senate Majority Leader stated, "Israel cannot survive if it becomes a pariah". Tamer Qarmout, a professor at the Doha Institute for Graduate Studies, stated, "Israel is acting like a pariah state. It's above international law and it can afford doing this because there is no punishment. It's not accountable to anyone, thanks to the United States."

Ulrich Brueckner, a professor at Stanford University, called Israel's war strategy "shortsighted" and leading to a "political loss that will last much longer than any potential victory it can claim". The US State Department spokesman stated that an Israeli invasion of Rafah would "leave Israel more isolated in the world". James Bays, the diplomatic editor of Al Jazeera English, wrote, "What is slowly developing is global isolation and condemnation for Israel, it's developing into a situation where it could become a pariah state." Yasmeen Serhan from Time magazine stated that Israel's actions has tarnished Israel's image, perhaps permanently across the globe. Moreover, by being so close to Israel, traditional allies such as the United States and Germany also lost significant global standing, political capital and reputational damage towards the Global South. Ayman Safadi, the foreign minister of Jordan, stated that Israel's actions in Gaza had turned it into a pariah state. Alon Pinkas, a former Israeli diplomat, stated Israel was undergoing the "slow-motion formation of a pariah state".

Amidst reports that the International Criminal Court was preparing arrest warrants for Israeli leaders, UC Davis professor Chimène Keitner stated, "If I.C.C. indictments were announced... they would bolster a growing international perception that Israel's actions in Gaza have violated international law. And that could contribute to the growing political pressure on Israel's allies to limit their support for Israel." In June 2024, Chris Gunness, a former UNRWA spokesman, discussed the United Nations adding Israel to a blacklist of entities that harm children, stating, "The groups and countries on this list include Boko Haram, ISIS, al-Qaeda, Russia, Myanmar. This puts Israel in a list of some of the most appalling regimes and groups in the world... so the isolation and pariah status of Israel will be continual". Akiva Eldar, an Israeli journalist, stated Israel was becoming a pariah state, saying, "The Israelis are not welcome everywhere." Chris Sidoti, a member of an independent United Nations Commission of Inquiry, stated, "The only conclusion you can draw is that the Israeli army is one of the most criminal armies in the world".

During an October 2024 meeting of the Inter-Parliamentary Union, large numbers of delegates walked out during speeches by MKs Dan Illouz, Tsega Melaku, and Elazar Stern in which they discussed "anti-Israel initiatives" proposed by the Palestinian delegation.

=== Russian invasion of Ukraine ===
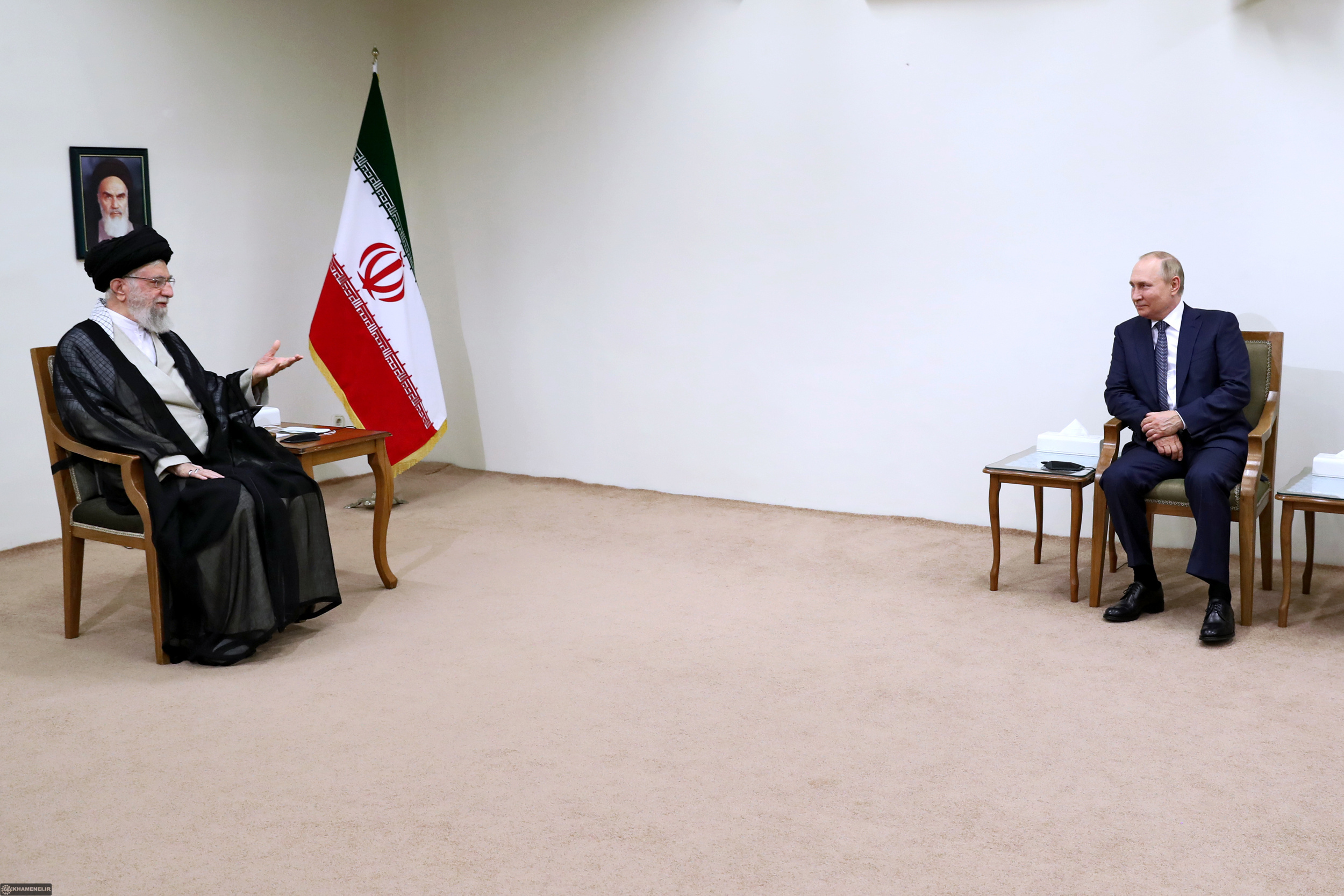
Russian President Vladimir Putin visiting Iranian Supreme Leader Ali Khamenei in Tehran, 19 July 2022

Ukraine asserted that Russia would attempt to exploit the Gaza war conflict to reduce international support for Ukraine, while Russia called it a Western policy failure. Ukrainian president Volodymyr Zelenskyy accused Russia of seeking to precipitate conflict in the Middle East to "undermine world unity, increase discord and contradictions, and thus help Russia destroy freedom in Europe."

Russian president Vladimir Putin declared the war "a clear example of the failure of United States policy in the Middle East", adding that Washington had consistently failed to take into account the fundamental interests of Palestinians. Russian commentators characterized the war as a military and intelligence failure of the West, predicting it would sap Western support for Ukraine. The New York Times stated that Russia's relations with Israel were deteriorating, driven in part by Western support for Ukraine and Iran's continued support for Russia in the Russian invasion of Ukraine. Palestinian-Ukrainians reported feeling a "double standard" as the Zelenskyy government supported Israel. Bloomberg columnist Andreas Kluth wrote that some Trump-supporting Republican legislators supported aid for Israel but opposed it for Ukraine. Politico wrote that it was a foregone conclusion that the war would divert US attention from Ukraine.

=== Impact on US–Iran relations ===
The war between Israel and Hamas has deepened the struggle between the US and Iran for influence in the Middle East. Iran's long-term strategy involves destroying Israel and driving a wedge between Israel and its regional neighbors. Despite tensions and anger across the region, the Biden administration's efforts to contain Iran and prevent a wider war are in line with the priorities of most Arab governments.

=== Global South ===
Some analysts described the Gaza war as exposing a rift between the Western World and the Global South. Alex Lo, a columnist at the South China Morning Post wrote, "When Israel's crimes against the Palestinians are written, future historians will not be able to say the world did nothing... It has been trying to do its basic duty to humanity. But the West, led by the US, has been thwarting them at every turn." Sami Abu Shehadeh, a former Palestinian Knesset member, criticized Western countries for cutting off funding for UNRWA following allegations against twelve of its employees, but not for sanctioning Israeli politicians for advocating for ethnic cleansing, stating, "Does anyone have any doubts why the US, UK, Australia, Canada and Germany are seen as part of the problem for the Global South?" The South Africa v. Israel case was reportedly seen in the Global South as a "test of the credibility" of the international system. Nigeria's Foreign Minister Yusuf Tuggar criticized what he called the "double standards" when it came to Israel's killings in Gaza.

Irish prime minister Leo Varadkar stated, "So many countries in the Global South—otherwise known as most of the world—interpret Europe's actions relating to Ukraine versus Palestine as double standards. I think they have a point." UN Secretary-General Antonio Guterres stated, "The basic principle of international humanitarian law is the protection of civilians. We must stick to principles in Ukraine as in Gaza without double standards".

=== Rules-based order ===
In addition to questions about double standards, Western governments faced charges of hypocrisy in their applications of the mechanisms of the rules-based order. In The Irish Times, professor Mary Lawlor, the United Nations special rapporteur on human rights defenders, wrote, "The international human rights architecture is creaking under the weight of the hypocrisy of states professing absolute support for a rules-based order yet continuing to facilitate this war by providing weapons to Israel to kill more innocent Palestinians." In a social media statement, former-Labor leader Jeremy Corbyn stated political leaders' "moral authority lies under the rubble, along with the thousands of lives that could have been saved by a ceasefire". The United Nations secretary-general Antonio Guterres stated, "International humanitarian law lies in tatters".

Amnesty International released a report stating that as a result of Israel's attack on Gaza, along with the Russian invasion of Ukraine and other armed conflicts, "the global rule-based order is at risk of decimation". Barry Trachtenberg, a professor at Wake Forest University, said the rules-based order was "falling apart", stating, "What we're seeing is this clear double-standard where when it's in the interests of the United States and Western allies, they'll invoke international law. When it's not in their interests, they'll clearly violate international law".

In June 2024, former Deputy National Security Advisor Ben Rhodes compared the United States' actions during the Russo-Ukrainian War to its actions with Israel, stating, "American rhetoric about the rules-based international order has been seen around the world on a split screen of hypocrisy, as Washington has supplied the Israeli government with weapons used to bombard Palestinian civilians with impunity". In October 2024, the prominent attorney Raji Sourani warned that Gaza risked becoming the "graveyard of international law."

=== Evacuations of foreign nationals ===
Hungary evacuated 215 of its nationals from Israel using two aircraft on 9 October, while Romania evacuated 245 of its citizens, including two pilgrimage groups, on two TAROM planes and two private aircraft on the same day. Australia also announced repatriation flights. Three hundred Nigerian pilgrims in Israel fled to Jordan before being airlifted home.

India launched Operation Ajay in order to evacuate its citizens from Israel.

On 12 October, the United Kingdom arranged flights for its citizens in Israel; the first plane departed Ben Gurion Airport that day. The government had said before that it would not be evacuating its nationals due to available commercial flights. However, the flights were commercial.

== International politics ==
=== British politics ===
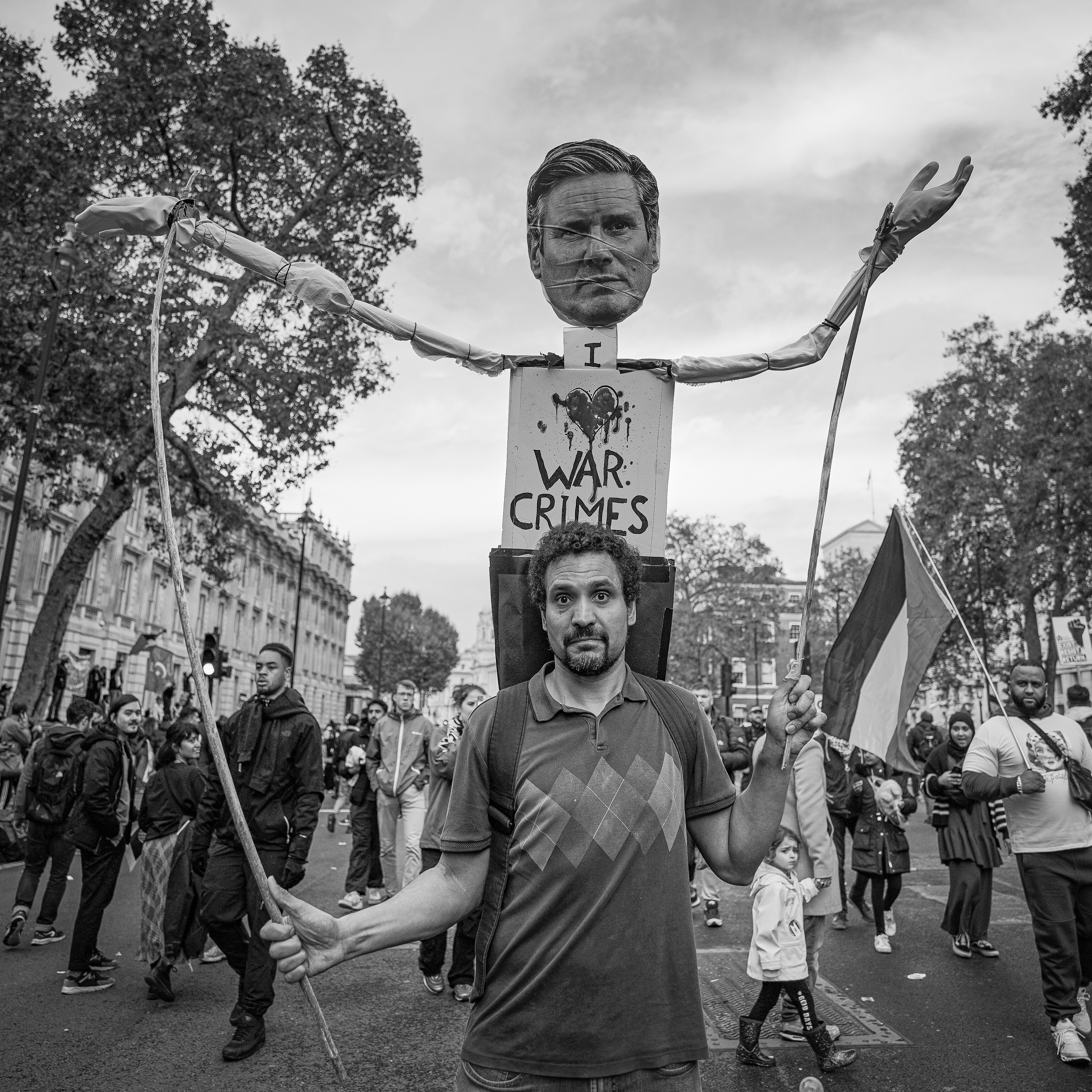
Pro-Palestinian protester criticising Labour leader Keir Starmer, 28 October 2023

As a result of the conflict, British politics has been affected. Labour MP Andy McDonald had the whip suspended after he made a speech at a pro-Palestinian rally. He later sued Conservative MP Chris Clarkson over his response to his comments.

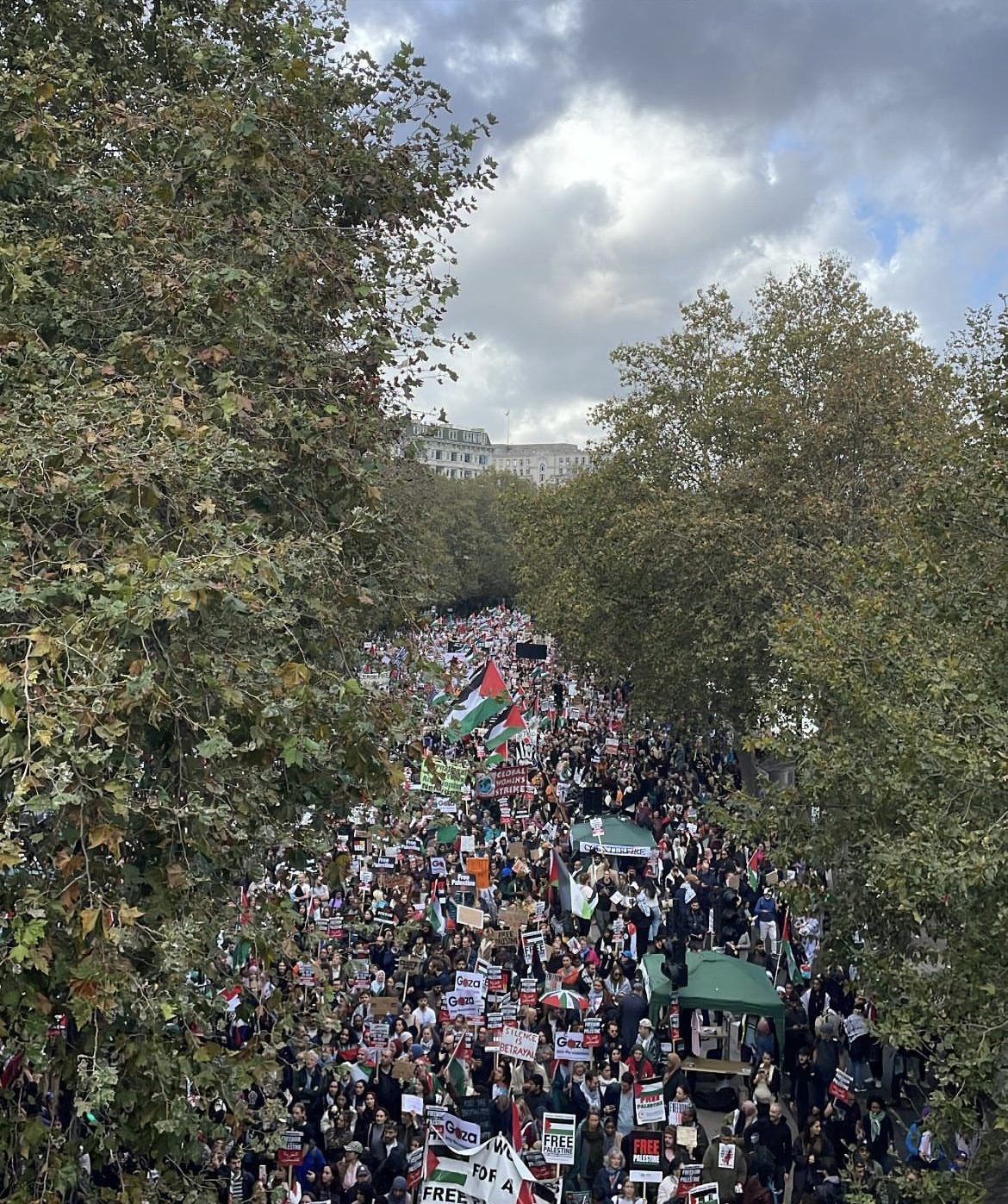
Pro-Palestinian rally in London, 28 October

In October 2023, Conservative MP Paul Bristow wrote a letter urging Prime Minister Rishi Sunak to support a "permanent ceasefire" in the Gaza war for humanitarian reasons. In further comments on his Facebook page, he said Palestinians "should not suffer collective punishment for the crimes of Hamas." Bristow co-chairs the all-party parliamentary group on British Muslims. He was fired as Parliamentary Private Secretary at the Department for Science, Innovation and Technology for his comments as they diverged from the government's position and "not consistent with the principles of collective responsibility". Bristow was the first Conservative MP to diverge.

Dozens of Labour Party councillors resigned due to Leader of the Labour Party Keir Starmer's decision not to push for a ceasefire in the Gaza war. Oxford City Council became under no overall control. By 25 October, 31 councillors had resigned from the party. All eighteen Labour members of Slough Borough Council publicly defied Starmer calling for a ceasefire.

The relatives of First Minister of Scotland Humza Yousaf and Liberal Democrat MP Layla Moran were stranded in the Gaza Strip.

On 8 November 2023, Imran Hussain resigned as Shadow Minister because of Keir Starmer's refusal to call for a ceasefire. Hussain said he wanted to be a "strong advocate for the humanitarian ceasefire", but could not do that as a frontbencher "given its current position".

On 15 November 2023, Keir Starmer suffered his largest defeat as leader when 56 of his MPs defied a three-line whip to vote for a SNP motion to support a ceasefire in Gaza. This included ten frontbenchers; Jess Phillips, Naz Shah, Afzal Khan, Yasmin Qureshi, Sarah Owen, Rachel Hopkins, Andy Slaughter, Paula Barker, Mary Foy and Dan Carden.

A group of humanitarian organizations, including Christian Aid, Global Justice Now, Oxfam, and War on Want, stated the UK government was complicit in the "slaughter of innocent civilians taking place every day in Gaza" until it ceased sending weapons to Israel.

In February 2024, four Labour councillors were suspended amid a Green Party motion on the Gaza War which called on Claire Holland, leader of Lambeth London Borough Council, to write to the Prime Minister and leader of the opposition to call for "an immediate, negotiated ceasefire by all parties". Three of the councillors, Martin Abrams, Deepak Sardiwal and Sonia Winifred voted for the motion, while a fourth, Sarina da Silva, abstained. It was reported that Abrams, a Jewish councillor for Streatham St Leonard's ward, was given an indefinite suspension. Sonia Winifred later resigned as councillor for Knight's Hill ward. In a speech, PM Rishi Sunak threatened foreign students with deportation if they engaged in protest, with MP Caroline Lucas stating that Sunak's government, "threatening to take visas off protesters and stirring up anti-Muslim hate", was the "real extremist". MP Richard Burgon stated Sunak's speech was "desperate", that his government had lost the argument over Gaza, and that "the huge peaceful protests over Gaza are not a threat to our democracy".

In the March 2024 Rochdale by-election George Galloway was elected after the campaign dominated by the Gaza war. In his election speech, Galloway said "Keir Starmer, this is for Gaza. You will pay a high price for the role that you have played in enabling, encouraging and covering for the catastrophe presently going on in occupied Gaza, in the Gaza Strip". The Labour candidate Azhar Ali had been dis-endorsed for comments he made, and later the former MP Graham Jones was also disciplined. During the 2024 United Kingdom general election, the Labour Party pledged to recognize the State of Palestine.

In the 2024 United Kingdom general election, Four independent candidates (Ayoub Khan, Adnan Hussain, Iqbal Mohamed, Shockat Adam) outright defeated Labour candidates as well as one (Claudia Webbe) acting as a spoiler to defeat one in areas with large Muslim populations; the results were suggested to be a push-back against Labour's stance on the Gaza war and Gaza humanitarian crisis.

Local authorities that have passed ceasefire motions include Shetland Islands Council, Scottish Borders Council, Bradford Borough Council, Oxford City Council, Sheffield City Council, Somerset Council, Burnley Borough Council and Calderdale Metropolitan Borough Council.

=== European politics ===
Marc Botenga, a Belgian member of the European Parliament, stated the upcoming elections would play a role in the way in which European leaders conducted the war, stating, "The European governments guarantee impunity to Israel, and people out there in the streets are outraged about this". Speaking to Spanish newspaper El País, top European diplomat Josep Borrell criticized Ursula von der Leyen's approach to the war, stating, "Von der Leyen's trip, with such a completely pro-Israeli position, without representing anyone but herself in a matter of international politics, has carried a high geopolitical cost for Europe."

Spanish prime minister Pedro Sanchez stated that he would push for the Spanish congress to recognize the state of Palestine before the end of his term in 2027. The EU's top diplomat Josep Borrell stated European leaders needed to stop using double standards, stating, "When we condemn this happening in the war in Ukraine, we have to use the same words for what's happening in Gaza". Amnesty International warned about the repression of free speech in Europe, with a researcher stating, "We see hate speech laws and we see counterterrorism laws being instrumentalised, being weaponised to go after what is legitimate speech under international standards".

Two entities were created based on the Gaza conflict: the Free Palestine Party, a European political alliance which ran in the 2024 European parliament election, and the Gaza List, an Austrian political party which ran in the 2024 Austrian legislative election; neither of them won any seats.

=== Jordan politics ===
As a consequence of the conflict between Israel and Hamas, the political landscape of Jordan has been impacted. Bisher al Khasawneh, the Prime Minister of Jordan, expressed his country's disapproval of Israel's offensive in Gaza by recalling its ambassador from Israel. Additionally, Jordan declared that Israel's ambassador, who had departed Amman following Hamas' attack, would not be permitted to return. Khasawneh emphasized that Jordan is considering all available options in its response to the Israeli aggression on Gaza and its subsequent consequences. It is noteworthy that Jordan and Israel had signed a peace treaty in 1994. Khasawneh argued that Israel's blockade of the heavily populated Gaza Strip cannot be justified as self-defense, contrary to their claims. He further emphasized that the indiscriminate Israeli assault does not differentiate between civilian and military objectives, even targeting safe zones and ambulances.

Because of the war, support for Hamas has increased among the people of Jordan.

=== US politics ===
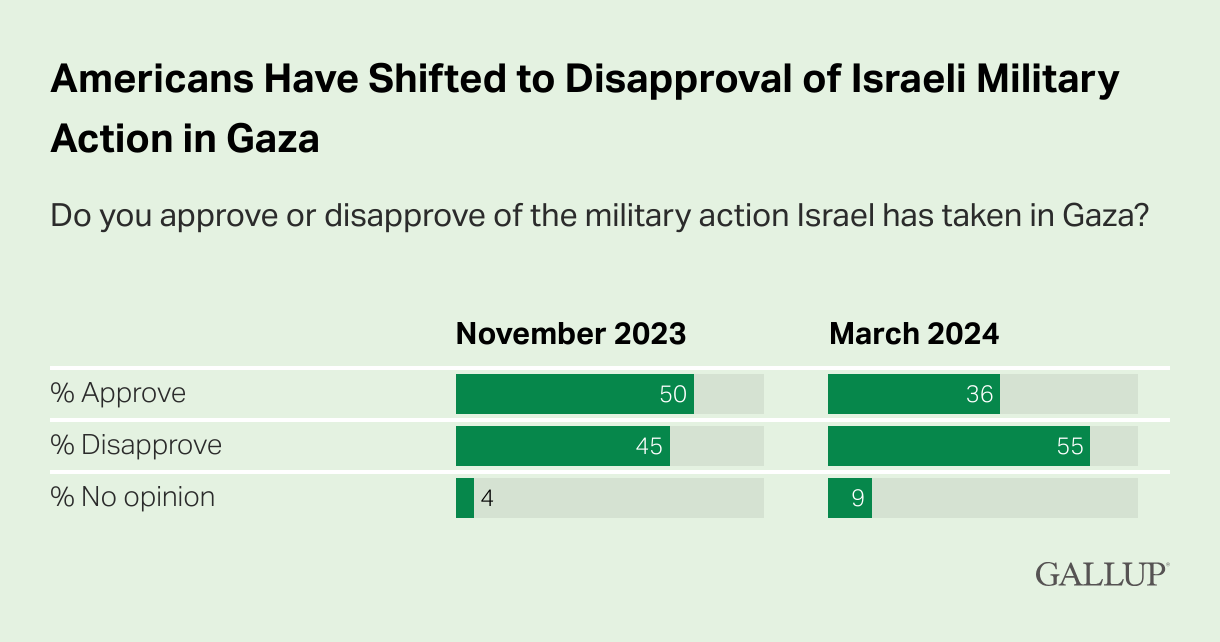
Gallup Poll showing US change from majority approval (Nov. 2023) to majority disapproval (March 2024) of Israeli military action in Gaza

In response to the Biden administration's response to the war, Muslim and Arab American leaders from swing states began an #AbandonBiden campaign to ensure Biden was a one-term president. The organization leaders indicated they would not support the likely Republican nominee Donald Trump, but vowed not to vote for Biden. On December 30, 2023, the #AbandonBiden campaign announced they were expanding to all fifty states. On 26 January 2024, Abdullah Hammoud, the mayor of Dearborn, Michigan, refused to meet the Biden campaign over the president's Gaza policy. On 1 February 2024, Arab American voters protested against Biden campaigning in Michigan, with one voter stating, "Just as he abandoned us, we will be abandoning him on Election Day."

A December 19 New York Times/Siena College poll found 57 percent of Americans disapproved of Joe Biden's handling of the conflict, with a plurality supporting Israel ending its military actions to protect civilians. Three quarters of 18-to-29-year-olds disapproved of Biden's handling, with half saying Israel was intentionally killing civilians and three-fourths saying it was not taking enough precautions for civilians. Harvard University political scientist Stephen Walt stated, "Biden looks heartless or clueless (or both) and many see him as no better than Trump". Edward Luce, a Financial Times editorialist, wrote Joe Biden's "seeming indifference to Palestinians could prove costly." The New York Times reported that African-American Christians were "so dismayed by the president's posture toward the war that their support for his re-election bid could be imperiled." Kimberly Halkett reported that the level of political opposition to the Gaza war had not been seen in the US since the Vietnam War protests.

In January 2024, following comments by Prime Minister Netanyahu stating that Israel would control the entirety of territory west of the Jordan River, Congressmembers Suzanne Bonamici and Don Beyer issued statements of condemnation.

During the February 2024 Michigan Democratic presidential primary Despite Joe Biden winning in a landslide, "Uncommitted" posed a significant challenge to him in an otherwise generally uncontested primary season. It was the first entity to win delegates outside of Biden, and won over 100,000 votes. The campaign's success was attributed to Arab, Muslim, young and progressive voters protesting Biden over his handling of the Gaza war. In a letter, more than 100 Democratic Party donors and activists stated that Biden's seeming "unconditional support" for Israel had created "the very real danger that President Biden will be defeated in November." Omar Wasow, a professor of political scientist, stated, "We're already seeing evidence of a generation divide on Israel, and that is going to be a long-term issue for the Democratic Party".

Mohamed Elmasry, a professor at the Doha Institute for Graduate Studies stated that opinion polling indicated young voters were angry at Biden, and that with Trump ahead in all swing states, the 2024 presidential election was "looking disastrous for Biden".

=== Brazilian politics ===
On October 18, Brazil dispatched a plane to Egypt carrying water purifiers to donate to Gaza, intending to evacuate Brazilians dual nationals from Gaza upon its return. The aircraft was scheduled to wait until Israel approved the departure of the Brazilian nationals.

On November 1, the first list of about 500 foreigners allowed to leave Gaza was released. As days passed, individuals of various nationalities but not Brazilians were permitted to leave Gaza. This led to suspicions among some Brazilians that Israel were doing a retaliation due to Brazil's role in the UN.

The Israeli ambassador to Brazil, Daniel Zohar Zonshine, reassured there were no political reasons for the delayed authorization.

On November 8, ambassador Zonshine remarked that Egypt was setting a daily quota for evacuations and attributed the delays to Hamas.

Journalist Reinaldo Azevedo criticized this explanation, alleging that the list of evacuees was determined by Israel and that Brazilian nationals were being held as diplomatic hostages.

On the same day, Brazilian Federal Police executed two temporary arrest warrants and eleven search warrants against a group suspected of preparing for terrorism. The operation sought evidence of possible recruitment of Brazilians for terrorist acts in Brazil linked to Hezbollah. Ambassador Zonshine commented, "If they chose Brazil, it's because there are people helping them." This statement elicited a strong and critical reaction from Brazilian authorities.

On November 9, former president Jair Bolsonaro tweeted that the Workers' Party (PT), the party of the current president Lula, sympathies with Hamas. That afternoon, Zonshine met with Brazilian deputies, showing videos from the October 7 attacks and sitting next to Bolsonaro. This meeting generated significant negative repercussions. Some deputies, like Lindbergh Farias of PT, even called for Zonshine's expulsion.

On November 10, Brazilians were authorized to leave Gaza, but the border remained closed. On November 12, all of the 32 Brazilians who requested to be evacuated were able to leave Gaza through Egypt. They were transported on the presidential aircraft VC-2. Upon their arrival in Brasília on the night of November 13, they were welcomed by president Lula. During this reception, the president condemned Israel's response as inhumane.

=== South and Central America ===
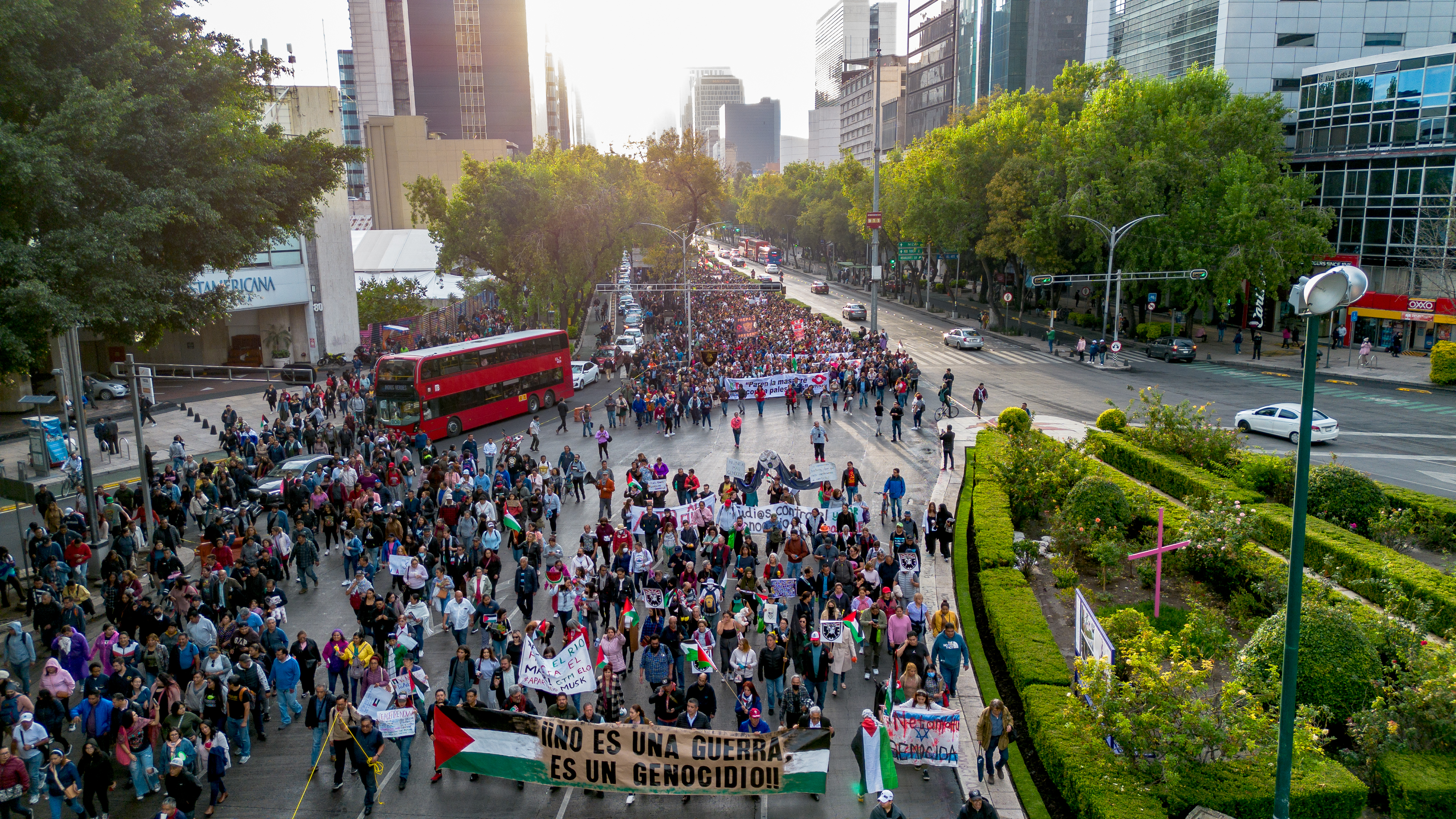
Pro-Palestinian protest in Mexico City, 29 November 2023

Several South American countries filed diplomatic protests against Israel in response to the conflict with Hamas. On the afternoon of Israel's 31 October airstrike on the Jabalia refugee camp, Bolivia severed all diplomatic ties with Israel, attributing its decision to alleged war crimes and human rights violations in the Gaza Strip. Chile and Colombia also recalled their ambassadors. Belize suspended diplomatic relations with Israel.

The Honduran President Xiomara Castro announced the recall of its ambassador on 4 November, shortly after the country's Ministry of foreign affairs stated that "Honduras energetically condemns the genocide and serious violations of international humanitarian law that the civilian Palestinian population is suffering in the Gaza Strip".

=== Australia ===
In May and June 2024, Labor's Fatima Payman statements in support of Palestine during the Gaza war and criticism of the Labor Albanese government's response to the war brought her out of step with the rest of the government. On 25 June 2024, Payman crossed the floor to support an Australian Greens resolution to recognise a Palestinian state, leading to her being indefinitely suspended from the Labor caucus. On 4 July 2024, Payman quit the Labor Party to sit as an independent.

In August 2024 independent MP Dai Le called for compassion following MP Peter Dutton's call to implement a temporary ban on any Palestinians from entering Australia. An investigation by SBS News found that the Australian government was denying the majority of visas of Palestinians attempting to flee Gaza.

== Antisemitism, Islamophobia, and Anti-Palestinianism ==
Following the October 7 attacks in 2023 and the outbreak of the Gaza war, there has been a surge of antisemitism around the world, including in the US, UK, France and Germany. There has also been there has been a surge of anti-Palestinian racism, anti-Arab racism, and Islamophobia around the world. Palestinians have expressed concerns over increased anti-Palestinianism in mass media and anti-Palestinian hate crimes. Human rights groups have noted an increase in anti-Palestinian hate speech and incitement to violence against Palestinians.

== Media ==
In November 2023, Osama bin Laden's Letter to the American People, published in 2002, went viral on TikTok and other social media. In the letter, bin Laden denounced numerous acts of American aggression such as US support for Israel, and supported al-Qaeda's war against the US as a defensive struggle. Numerous social media users, including Americans, expressed their opposition to US foreign policy by widely sharing the letter and its contents. The letter was removed from The Guardian website after more than 20 years of being present online in the news outlet's webpage, and TikTok began issuing takedowns of videos featuring the letter. Reporting in The Washington Post suggested that the virality of the letter had been limited prior to media coverage, having never trended on TikTok, that many of the TikTok videos covering the letter were critical of bin Laden, and that the media coverage had exaggerated its significance and elevated the virality of the letter.

== See also ==
- Casualties of the Gaza war
- International reactions to the Gaza war
- Timeline of the Israeli–Palestinian conflict in 2023
- Outline of the Gaza war
- United States support for Israel in the Gaza war
- Diplomatic impact of the Gaza war
