= Kimberly Halkett =

Canadian journalist

- Born: Victoria, British Columbia, Canada
- Education: Ryerson Polytechnical Institute
- Occupation: Journalist
- Known for: Al Jazeera's White House correspondent

Kimberly Halkett is a Canadian journalist who has covered the White House and American news since 1998, first for Global Television, then for Al Jazeera when it launched its English channel.

== Early life ==
Halkett was born in Victoria, British Columbia. She graduated from Ryerson Polytechnical Institute (now Toronto Metropolitan University) in 1992.

== Career ==
Halkett previously worked as White House correspondent for Canada's Global Television Network. She started to work for Al Jazeera English and has covered the White House, reporting on the Clinton, Bush, Obama, and Trump administrations. She is currently covering the Trump administration.

Topics she covers include U.S. politics, human rights, Middle East, religion, justice, intelligence, and security.
