= Israel–Saudi Arabia relations =

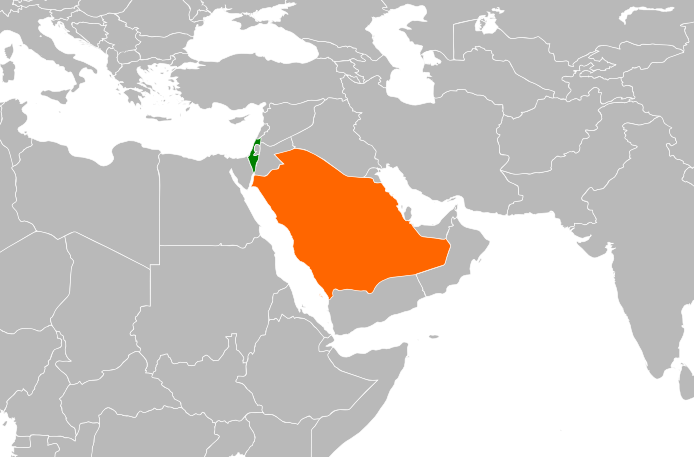
- Israel: Saudi Arabia

The State of Israel and the Kingdom of Saudi Arabia have never had formal diplomatic relations. In 1947, Saudi Arabia voted against the United Nations Partition Plan for Palestine, and currently does not recognize Israeli sovereignty. In 2024, Saudi Arabia confirmed that it would not recognize Israel without a Palestinian state and strongly condemned the "crimes of the Israeli occupation" against the Palestinian people, in a statement by Prince Mohammed bin Salman "The Kingdom will not stop its tireless work towards the establishment of an independent Palestinian state with East Jerusalem as its capital, and we affirm that the Kingdom will not establish diplomatic relations with Israel without that".

Unofficial bilateral negotiations on Israeli–Saudi normalization began in 2023, with the United States serving as the mediator. These talks were disrupted by the war in Gaza and relations between Israel and Saudi Arabia are deteriorating as Israel does not seek the path to create the independent Palestine state. However, reports have surfaced in recent years indicating extensive behind-the-scenes cooperation in the areas of diplomacy, intelligence, and security.

== Early years ==
A charter member of the Arab League, Saudi Arabia has supported Palestinian rights to sovereignty, and called for withdrawal from the West Bank and other territory occupied by Israel since 1967. In 1947, Saudi Arabia was one of several Middle Eastern states that voted against in the United Nations Partition Plan for Palestine. Saudi troops were sent to fight against Israel in the 1948 and 1973 wars. The 1981 Israel operation Operation Opera, a preemptive strike on nuclear reactor purchased by Iraq from France in 1976, allegedly took place with the cooperation of Saudi Arabia, as the flight path was over Saudi territory.. In recent years Saudi Arabia has changed its viewpoint concerning the validity of negotiating with Israel, which it previously refused. It calls for Israel's withdrawal from territory occupied in June 1967. In 2002 then-Crown Prince Abdullah extended a multilateral peace proposal based on withdrawal that would follow the borders of a two-state solution. At that time, Israel did not respond to the offer. In 2007 Saudi Arabia again officially supported a peaceful resolution of the Arab–Israeli conflict in which Israel was to concede to withdraw to the borders set in the two-state solutions, which generated more official negative reactions from Israeli authorities, citing the Oslo Accords and the Saudis' deviation from those accords. At this time, no demands were made of any other party other than of Israel.

Saudi Arabia rejected the Camp David Accords, claiming that they would be unable to achieve a comprehensive political solution that would ensure Palestinian Arabs can all move to Israel and the division of Jerusalem. In response to Egypt "betraying" the Arab States and signing peace with Israel, Saudi Arabia, along with all the Arab States, broke diplomatic relations with and suspended aid to Egypt; the two countries renewed formal ties in 1987. Simultaneously Saudi Arabia and Israel initiated their early steps towards a secret dialogue.

== Warming (post-2010s) ==
In 2005, Saudi Arabia announced the end of its ban on Israeli goods and services, due to its application to the World Trade Organization, where one member country cannot have a total ban on another. However, as of August 2006, the Saudi boycott was not cancelled. Reports in Arabic-language media suggest that there have been several meetings between Saudi Arabia's Crown Prince Mohammed bin Salman and Israeli officials over the last two years, with at least one of them taking place in Eilat in 2015 and another on the sidelines of the Arab summit in Jordan in March 2017. It has also been reported that Saudi and Israeli officers have been regularly meeting in a joint war room serving as a coordination center for Jordan, Saudi Arabia, and the United States.

After the Arab Spring, Israel views the Saudi government as "guarantor of stability", according to the New York Times. In 2011, Israel approved a German sale of 200 Leopard tanks to Saudi Arabia. The approval came from Uzi Arad, the national security advisor to Benjamin Netanyahu.

During the 2014 Israel–Gaza conflict, Middle East Eye editor David Hearst wrote an article claiming that Saudi Arabia was supportive of Israel's actions in the conflict, and that officials from Mossad and the Saudi intelligence agencies met regularly. The Saudi ambassador to the United Kingdom, Mohammed bin Nawwaf bin Abdulaziz, denied that the Saudi government was allied with Israel, describing Israel's actions against civilians in Gaza as "crimes against humanity" - however he did not deny that the two countries had contact, saying that "any dealings by the Kingdom of Saudi Arabia with Israel have been limited to attempts to bring about a plan for peace".

After Egypt agreed to transfer the Red Sea islands of Tiran and Sanafir to Saudi Arabia in April 2016, the Foreign Minister of Saudi Arabia said that his country would honor the terms of the Israeli-Egyptian peace treaty regarding the islands. However, they will have no direct contact with Israel over the matter. The Israeli government did not signal any opposition to the deal. Tzachi Hanegbi who heads the Knesset's Foreign Affairs and Defense Committee said that the deal does not threaten Israel and welcomed it as a closing of ranks by Sunni Arab states that share Israel's hostility to Iran, Hezbollah, and the Islamist extremist insurgents racking the region. Israel's Defence Minister said on 12 April that Saudi Arabia had given it written assurances over freedom of passages in Tiran Straits.

According to a May 2015 article by The Times of Israel, the London-based Arab paper Rai al-Youm reported that Israel had offered to provide Saudi Arabia with Iron Dome technology against rockets from bordering Yemen. The proposal was reportedly sent via American diplomats during a meeting in Amman, Jordan, and subsequently refused. Official sources have not confirmed the report.

On 23 July 2016, a retired Saudi general visited Israel, heading a delegation of academics and businessmen seeking to encourage relations. Issawi Frej stated that Saudis wanted to open up to Israel and that it was a strategic move for them. He further stated that they wanted to continue what former Egyptian president Anwar Sadat started (with the 1979 Israeli-Egyptian peace treaty).

In August 2016, some journalists in Saudi Arabia reported that Saudi Arabia had started shifting their tone towards Israel and had started to criticize antisemitism in Arab countries. Some sections of the Israeli media described it as an apparent media campaign by the country to shape a positive public opinion for deepening of ties between the two nations.

The Times has reported that Saudi Arabia has tested the ability to stand down their air defenses to allow an Israeli strike on Iran to pass through their airspace. Both nations have denied this.

In spite of not having official diplomatic relations, they cooperate with each other by intelligence exchange, especially about Iran. In a meeting at the Washington office of the Council on Foreign Relations, Anwar Eshki, a retired major general in the Saudi armed forces and Dore Gold, a former Israeli ambassador close to Prime Minister Benjamin Netanyahu, discussed "their common interests in opposing Iran".

In June 2017, former Israeli Defense Minister Moshe Ya’alon stated that "We and the Arabs, the same Arabs who organized in a coalition in the Six-Day War to try to destroy the Jewish state, today find themselves in the same boat with us … The Sunni Arab countries, apart from Qatar, are largely in the same boat with us since we all see a nuclear Iran as the number one threat against all of us,".

On 19 November 2017, Energy Minister Yuval Steinitz said that Israel has had covert contacts with Saudi Arabia amid common concerns over Iran. This is the first public admission of cooperation between the two countries by a senior Israeli official.

A diplomatic cable from Israel's foreign ministry to its overseas embassies instructed Israeli diplomats to back the Saudi Arabian-led intervention in Yemen, and to back Saudi Arabia in the Iran–Saudi Arabia proxy conflict, as a way to exert pressure against Iran and Hezbollah, which are rivals of both Israel and Saudi Arabia. The cable was leaked to Israel's Channel 10 News in November 2017.

In November 2017, the Israel Defense Forces chief of general staff gave an exclusive interview to Saudi media. Lieutenant General Gadi Eizenkot confirmed Israel's willingness "to exchange experiences with moderate Arab countries and exchange intelligence to confront Iran" and noting that on certain matters, "there is complete agreement between us and Saudi Arabia."

In November 2018, Netanyahu publicly defended Saudi Crown Prince Mohammad bin Salman in the wake of the killing of Jamal Khashoggi, stating "it is very important for the stability of the region and the world that Saudi Arabia remain stable", and privately urged the U.S. administration to maintain its strong security relationship with Saudi Arabia.

In December 2018, the Wall Street Journal wrote that Ahmad Asiri, the general thought to be central in the murder of Jamal Khashoggi, had also been central in the connections between Saudi Arabia and Israel. He had visited Israel several times, being the highest placed Saudi official to do so.

The General Authority of Civil Aviation forbids aircraft traveling to Israel from overflying Saudi airspace, but an exception was made for Air India from 22 March 2018, when they launched a flight from Delhi to Tel Aviv that would normally not fly over Saudi airspace.

On 2 September 2020, Saudi Arabia announced that flights to the United Arab Emirates "from all countries" would be allowed to use Saudi airspace. This was in response to the normalization of Israel–UAE relations and the launch of direct flights between the two nations in August 2020. In November 2022, 76% of Saudi respondents said they had negative views of the Abraham Accords.

== Potential normalization and frozen ==
In March 2023, Saudi Arabia was reportedly seeking assurances from the United States to establish normalized relations with Israel. These assurances included assistance in developing a civilian nuclear program, lessening limitations on US arms sales, and providing security guarantees. News of the proposal broke hours before it was announced that a seven-year diplomatic rift between Saudi Arabia and Iran would end following an agreement facilitated by China. The specific details of any potential normalization agreement between Israel and Saudi Arabia are ambiguous, and it is likely that certain American lawmakers would resist its implementation. The ramifications of such an accord could lead to uncertainty regarding the trajectory of the Israeli-Palestinian conflict as well as the strengthening of regional opposition to Iran.

In September 2023, Israeli tourism minister Haim Katz attended a UN conference in Saudi Arabia, the first-ever Israeli ministerial visit to Saudi Arabia. The following week, Israeli communications minister Shlomo Karhi became the first Israeli politician to deliver a speech in Saudi Arabia. Karhi's speech mentioned the India-Middle East-Europe Economic Corridor, which among other countries would travel through Saudi Arabia and Israel, and is seen as a precursor to Israel-Saudi normalization.

In 2023-2024, reports indicated that Saudi authorities have been removing anti-Israeli and antisemitic content from their textbooks, signaling a more moderate approach towards Israel and Zionism, and acknowledging the Jewish presence in the region.

In October 2023, following the outbreak of the Gaza war, Saudi Arabia halted negotiations. According to the poll conducted by The Washington Institute for Near East Policy between 14 November and 6 December 2023, 96% of Saudi participants believed that Arab nations should cut all ties with Israel, 95% of Saudis did not believe that Hamas killed civilians during the October 7 attacks, 40% of Saudis expressed a favorable opinion of Hamas, and only 16% of Saudis said that "Hamas should stop calling for the destruction of Israel, and instead accept a permanent two-state solution to the conflict based on the 1967 borders." Khalid bin Bandar Al Saud, the Saudi ambassador to the United Kingdom, said in a 9 January 2024 BBC interview that Saudi Arabia was still interested in peace and normalized relations with Israel following the war, on the condition of the creation of a Palestinian state. United States Secretary of State Antony Blinken also made similar remarks during a shuttle diplomacy tour of the Middle East.

In the 2025 Iran–Israel war, Saudi Arabia condemned the Israeli strikes on Iran and diplomatically supported Iran.

== Coalition against Turkey ==
In August 2020, Mossad's chief Yossi Cohen, in his statement to the Saudi, Egyptian, and Emirati counterparts, openly named Turkey as a new threat to peace in the region and singled out a number of allies that Turkey would gain potential support from, such as Azerbaijan and Qatar, the former of which has had strong relations with Israel since the 1990s. Saudi Arabia, Israel, Egypt, and the United Arab Emirates have viewed Turkish expansionism under Recep Tayyip Erdoğan as having represented a new danger for the Middle East since 2018 due to ongoing conflicts with Turkey in Syria, Iraq, Sudan, and Libya, with Saudi expert Saud al-Sarhan viewing it as mirroring the Ottoman pan-Islamist policies in World War I.

During the 2020 Nagorno-Karabakh conflict, Israel supported Azerbaijan, an ally of both Turkey and Saudi Arabia, against Armenia; but after the Turkish leader blamed Israel, Saudi Arabia, and the United Arab Emirates for inflaming the conflict in the Caucasus, Israeli Defense Minister Benny Gantz accused Turkey of terrorism and destabilization. Saudi Arabian Head of Commercial Chamber Ajlan al-Ajlan called for anti-Turkish boycott after President Erdoğan's perceived anti-Saudi remarks.

== See also ==
- History of the Jews in Saudi Arabia
- Foreign relations of Israel
- Foreign relations of Saudi Arabia
- International recognition of Israel
- Iran–Israel relations
- Iran–Saudi Arabia relations
