= Foreign relations of Bolivia =

Bolivia traditionally has maintained normal diplomatic relations with all hemispheric states except Chile. Foreign relations are handled by the Ministry of Foreign Affairs, headed by the Chancellor of Bolivia, Rogelio Mayta.

== Overview ==
Relations with Chile, strained since Bolivia's defeat in the War of the Pacific (1879–1883) and its loss of the coastal province of Atacama, were severed from 1962 to 1975 in a dispute over the use of the waters of the Lauca River. Relations were resumed in 1975 but broken again in 1978 over the inability of the two countries to reach an agreement that solved the Atacama border dispute, which might have granted Bolivia a sovereign access to the sea. In the 1960s, relations with Cuba were broken by the Bolivian dictatorship following Castro's rise to power but resumed under the Paz Estenssoro Administration in 1985, which came to power through democratic elections.

Bolivia pursues a foreign policy with a heavy economic component. Bolivia has become more active in the Organization of American States (OAS), the Rio Group, and in MERCOSUR, with which it signed an association agreement in 1996. Bolivia promotes its policies on sustainable development and the empowerment of indigenous people.

Bolivia is a member of the United Nations and some of its specialized agencies and related programs; OAS; Andean Community; Intelsat; Non-Aligned Movement; International Parliamentary Union; Latin American Integration Association ALADI; World Trade Organization; Rio Treaty; Rio Group; and Uruguay, Paraguay, Bolivia (URUPABOL, restarted in 1993). As an outgrowth of the 1994 Summit of the Americas, Bolivia hosted a hemispheric summit conference on sustainable development in December 1996. A First Ladies' hemispheric summit was also hosted by Bolivia that same month.

The GeGaLo Index of gains and losses after energy transition ranks Bolivia 128th out of 156 countries. It is thus among the countries that will lose strength on the international stage if a global transition to renewable energy is carried out and there is no longer demand for Bolivian oil and gas. It is estimated to experience the third largest loss of all Latin American countries (after Colombia and Venezuela).

== United Nations involvement ==
Bolivia, being one of the founding members of the United Nations, has frequently been involved with the Intergovernmental Organisation. In November 2008, the Bolivian contingent of UN peacekeeping troops with the United Nations Organization Stabilization Mission in the Democratic Republic of the Congo was relocated to safety, as at least one other regional state was also reviewing its own mission's security. The country had a detachment of 130 soldiers that was working in Bukavu, but was moved to a location near Goma. Bolivia currently serves as a non-permanent member of the United Nations Security Council, with a two-year term ending in 2018. While a member of the Security Council, Bolivia strongly criticized United States President Donald Trump's decision to move the United States' Embassy in Israel from Tel Aviv to Jerusalem, and called for a public meeting of the Security Council to respond to the decision. The Bolivian delegation also joined Russia in casting a negative vote for the renewal of the OPCW-UN Joint Investigative Mechanism in Syria, citing technical concerns about the Mechanism.

During the United Nations General Assembly Resolution ES-11/1, on March 2, 2022, Bolivia voted to abstain, along with 34 other nations.

== International disputes ==
Bolivia has wanted a sovereign corridor to the South Pacific Ocean since the Atacama area was lost to Chile in 1884; dispute with Chile over Rio Lauca water rights.

Since the accession of Carlos Mesa to the Presidency, Bolivia has pressed its demands for a corridor to the Pacific. In March 2004, Mesa announced that the government would stage a series of public rallies across the country and in Bolivian embassies abroad in remembrance of those who died in the War of the Pacific, and to call for Chile to grant Bolivia a seacoast. Mesa made this demand a cornerstone of his administration's policy.

President Evo Morales maintained a hard position on this issue of which the symbolic importance is underlined by the fact that Bolivia also still has a navy, despite it not currently having access to the sea. In October 2018, the ICJ (International Court of Justice), ruled against Bolivia in a case that would determine whether or not Bolivia could force Chile to negotiate access to the sea. However, the ICJ did state that cooperation was desirable if workable solutions are to be found.

== Illicit drugs ==
Bolivia is the world's third-largest cultivator of coca (after Peru and Colombia) with an estimated 218 square kilometres (84 sq mi) under cultivation in 1999, a 45% decrease in overall cultivation of coca from 1998 levels; intermediate coca products and cocaine exported to or through Colombia, Brazil, Argentina, and Chile to the United States and other international drug markets; alternative crop program aims to reduce illicit coca cultivation.

== Diplomatic relations ==
List of countries which Bolivia maintains diplomatic relations with:

#	Country	Date
1	Peru	24 June 1826
2	France	19 June 1831
3	Mexico	21 November 1831
4	Argentina	16 October 1835
5	Chile	1 August 1840
6	United Kingdom	29 September 1840
7	Ecuador	7 April 1842
8	Uruguay	1 November 1843
9	Spain	21 July 1847
10	United States	3 January 1849
11	Italy	25 February 1864
12	Brazil	27 March 1867
—	Holy See	6 August 1877
13	Portugal	10 May 1879
14	Paraguay	15 October 1879
15	Venezuela	14 September 1883
16	Russia	9 August 1898
17	Dominican Republic	30 January 1902
18	Cuba	19 July 1902
19	Costa Rica	3 January 1907
20	Netherlands	21 July 1911
21	Colombia	19 March 1912
22	Belgium	18 April 1912
23	Japan	3 April 1914
24	Austria	15 May 1924
25	Denmark	29 December 1926
26	Sweden	2 February 1932
27	Czech Republic	12 February 1935
28	Poland	3 September 1935
29	Norway	25 February 1937
30	Panama	26 August 1942
31	Guatemala	5 September 1945
32	Switzerland	5 March 1946
33	Lebanon	21 February 1949
34	Turkey	21 September 1950
35	Hungary	17 October 1952
36	Germany	30 December 1952
37	Serbia	15 May 1954
38	Nicaragua	6 July 1955
39	Israel	3 July 1957
40	Haiti	24 November 1957
41	India	17 December 1958
42	Egypt	17 November 1960
43	Canada	May 1961
—	Sovereign Military Order of Malta	15 June 1962
44	Thailand	1 February 1963
45	Finland	21 September 1963
46	Indonesia	1963
47	Sri Lanka	1963
48	Morocco	26 June 1964
49	South Korea	25 April 1965
50	South Africa	1967
51	Romania	18 October 1969
52	Philippines	7 January 1970
53	Bulgaria	18 December 1970
54	Pakistan	14 January 1975
55	Australia	10 April 1975
56	Malaysia	9 May 1977
57	Suriname	29 June 1978
58	Algeria	2 February 1980
59	Cyprus	3 March 1983
60	Bahamas	5 August 1983
61	Grenada	5 August 1983
62	Barbados	2 February 1984
63	Jamaica	2 February 1984
64	China	9 July 1985
65	Antigua and Barbuda	26 August 1985
66	Kuwait	28 July 1986
67	Mozambique	20 November 1986
68	United Arab Emirates	1 December 1986
69	Oman	16 December 1986
70	Zambia	5 January 1987
71	Senegal	16 January 1987
72	Vietnam	10 February 1987
73	Guyana	12 March 1987
74	São Tomé and Príncipe	15 May 1987
75	Nepal	20 May 1987
76	Malta	7 July 1987
77	Singapore	3 August 1987
78	Albania	21 August 1987
79	Belize	1 October 1987
80	Equatorial Guinea	21 October 1987
81	Ghana	3 December 1987
82	Ethiopia	8 December 1987
83	Guinea	15 December 1987
84	Cape Verde	1 March 1989
85	Mongolia	1 March 1989
86	Comoros	3 April 1989
87	Uganda	3 May 1989
88	Bangladesh	9 June 1989
89	Yemen	30 June 1989
90	Luxembourg	21 December 1990
91	Ukraine	8 February 1992
92	Slovenia	16 March 1992
93	Armenia	27 July 1992
94	Croatia	26 November 1992
95	Slovakia	1 January 1993
96	Jordan	8 February 1993
97	Lithuania	12 January 1994
98	Belarus	11 April 1994
99	Cambodia	26 April 1994
100	North Macedonia	15 June 1994
101	Andorra	14 June 1995
102	Azerbaijan	8 July 1996
103	Moldova	8 July 1996
104	Turkmenistan	9 July 1996
105	Tajikistan	9 August 1996
106	Angola	29 January 1997
107	Bosnia and Herzegovina	27 February 1997
108	New Zealand	29 October 1998
109	Georgia	20 November 1998
110	Ireland	30 September 1999
111	Saudi Arabia	17 October 2000
112	Honduras	21 September 2002
113	Latvia	8 July 2003
114	Estonia	10 March 2004
115	Qatar	6 July 2004
116	Iceland	17 September 2004
117	Iran	8 September 2007
118	Libya	13 August 2008
119	Montenegro	18 October 2010
120	Dominica	5 June 2012
121	Tunisia	24 July 2012
122	Uzbekistan	28 November 2012
123	Kazakhstan	17 May 2013
—	State of Palestine	15 November 2013
124	Fiji	9 January 2014
125	Sudan	24 October 2014
126	Burundi	17 November 2016
127	Saint Kitts and Nevis	25 January 2017
128	Kyrgyzstan	29 May 2019
129	Maldives	31 May 2019
130	Saint Lucia	26 June 2019
131	Saint Vincent and the Grenadines	25 September 2019
132	San Marino	25 September 2019
133	Nigeria	20 September 2021
134	Rwanda	21 September 2021
135	Liechtenstein	17 November 2021
136	Zimbabwe	24 November 2021
137	Syria	4 September 2023
138	Togo	20 September 2023
139	Bahrain	22 September 2023
140	Benin	24 July 2024
141	Iraq	26 July 2024
142	Monaco	26 July 2024
143	Timor-Leste	26 July 2024
144	Botswana	1 August 2024
145	Laos	6 November 2024
146	Lesotho	8 November 2024
147	Ivory Coast	19 November 2024
148	Mali	6 December 2024
149	Liberia	2024
150	Greece	Unknown
151	Trinidad and Tobago	Unknown

== Bilateral relations ==
=== Africa ===
Country	Formal Relations Began	Notes
Equatorial Guinea	21 October 1987	Both countries established diplomatic relations on 21 October 1987. In November 2017, President Teodoro Obiang Nguema Mbasogo paid an official visit to Bolivia becoming the first African head-of-state to ever visit Bolivia.
Libya	13 August 2008	See Bolivia–Libya relations Both countries established diplomatic relations on 13 August 2008.
Morocco	26 June 1964	Both countries established diplomatic relations on 26 June 1964: Bolivia is accredited to Morocco through its embassy in Madrid, Spain.; Morocco is accredited to Bolivia, through its embassy in Lima, Peru.
Sahrawi Arab Democratic Republic	14 November 1982	Both countries established diplomatic relations on 14 November 1982 which were suspended by Bolivia on 24 February 2026.
South Africa	1967	See Bolivia–South Africa relations Both countries established diplomatic relations in 1967 when has been accredited first Ambassador of South Africa to Bolivia (resident in Argentina).: Bolivia maintains an honorary consulate in Johannesburg.

=== Americas ===
Country	Formal Relations Began	Notes
Argentina	7 December 1858	See Argentina–Bolivia relations Both countries established diplomatic relations on 7 December 1858. In 2024, Argentina recorded a US$36.9 million trade surplus with Bolivia, exporting $556 million, primarily refined petroleum ($127 million) and crude petroleum ($83.5 million) against $519 million in imports led by petroleum gas ($371 million). By August 2026, monthly bilateral trade shifted to a $21.4 million deficit ($63.1 million in exports versus $84.4 million in imports).: Argentina has an embassy in La Paz and a consulate-general in Santa Cruz de la Sierra and consulates in Tarija, Cochabamba, Villazón and Yacuiba.; Bolivia has an embassy in Buenos Aires and consulates in Córdoba, Jujuy, La Quiaca, Mendoza, Orán, Pocito, Rosario, Salta and Viedma.
Brazil		See Bolivia–Brazil relations Brazil and Bolivia worked on expanding and diversifying trade between the two countries in the last quarter of 2008. The 6th Meeting of the Commission for Monitoring Brazil-Bolivia trade was used to this end. As it stood, at the time Brazil was the main destination for exports from Bolivia, having bought, in 2007, 35.7% of the products that Bolivian companies sell to other countries. They were also the main exporter to Bolivia, sending 24.7% of products imported into Bolivia. As industrialized products represented 94.6% of Brazilian sales up to September of the year, Bolivian sales in the same period were limited largely to natural gas, which accounted for up to 92.7% of the total purchased from the country, or US$1.89 billion. The products with the greatest scope for an increase in trade from Brazil to Bolivia were crude oil, insecticides, aircraft, vehicle engines, soy in grain, vegetable oils and ironworks products, amongst others. From Bolivia to Brazil, products such as animal feed, vegetable oil, crude oil, tin, ores of precious metals, precious gems, dried and fresh fruit, plants, leather and garments were also capable of seeing sales grow.: Bolivia has an embassy in Brasília, consulates in Cáceres, Corumbá, Epitaciolândia, Guajará-Mirim and consulates-general in Rio de Janeiro and São Paulo.; Brazil has an embassy in La Paz, consulate in Puerto Quijarro and consulates-general in Cobija, Cochabamba, Guayaramerín and Santa Cruz de la Sierra.
Chile	1978, Diplomatic severed in 1978, Restored in 2002	See Bolivia–Chile relations Bolivia and Chile have had strained relations ever since independence in the early 19th century because of the Atacama border dispute. Relations soured even more after Bolivia lost its coast to Chile during the War of the Pacific and became a landlocked country (Bolivia still claims a corridor to the Pacific Ocean.) Chile and Bolivia have maintained only consular relations since 1978 when territorial negotiations failed.: Bolivia has consulates-general in Santiago and Arica and consulates in Antofagasta, Calama and Iquique.; Chile has consulates-general in La Paz and in Santa Cruz de la Sierra.
Cuba	10 June 1915	See Bolivia–Cuba relations Both countries established diplomatic relations on 10 June 1915.: Bolivia has an embassy in Havana.; Cuba has an embassy in La Paz.
Mexico	21 November 1831	See Bolivia–Mexico relations Both countries established diplomatic relations on 21 November 1831.: Bolivia has an embassy in Mexico City.; Mexico has an embassy in La Paz.
Nicaragua	6 July 1955	Both countries established diplomatic relations on 6 July 1955 when has been appointed Ambassador of Nicaragua to Argentina, Doctor Otto Lamm Jarquin as Envoy Extraordinary and Minister Plenipotentiary to Bolivia. Relations between Bolivia and Nicaragua have improved since the election of Daniel Ortega. In 2007, President Evo Morales stated that "Daniel Ortega's win gives strength and hope not only to Nicaragua but to all of Latin America." Both countries are members of the Bolivarian Alliance for the Americas (ALBA).: Bolivia has an embassy in Managua.; Nicaragua has an embassy in La Paz.
Panama	28 August 1942	Both countries established diplomatic relations on 28 August 1942.: Bolivia has an embassy in Panama City.; Panama has an embassy in La Paz.
Paraguay	17 June 1843	See Bolivia–Paraguay relations Both countries established diplomatic relations on 17 June 1843. In 2009, Bolivian President Evo Morales and Paraguayan President Fernando Lugo signed an agreement settling a border dispute, which led to a war in the 1930s. President Lugo expressed the hope that natural resources could now "be developed and used by both countries": Bolivia has an embassy in Asunción.; Paraguay has an embassy in La Paz, a consulate-general in Santa Cruz de la Sierra and a consulate in Villamontes.
Peru	24 June 1826	See Bolivia–Peru relations Both countries established diplomatic relations on 24 June 1826: Bolivia has an embassy in Lima and consulates in Cusco, Ilo, Puno and Tacna.; Peru has an embassy in La Paz and consulates-general in Cochabamba and Santa Cruz de la Sierra.
United States	3 January 1849	See Bolivia–United States relations Both countries established diplomatic relations on 3 January 1849. Bolivia traditionally has had strong ties to the United States. Economically, the United States has been a long-standing consumer of Bolivian exports and a partner in development projects. In 1991 the United States forgave more than US$350 million owed by Bolivia to the U.S. Agency for International Development and the U.S. Department of Agriculture. Presently, the United States leads an international contingent pressuring Bolivia to curb its illegal drug trade. The election of Evo Morales strained relations between the two countries. Morales rose to power as the head of a trade union of coca growers. He has campaigned against coca eradication on behalf of the growers, citing the legitimate uses of coca leaves in traditional Aymara and Quechua culture. His policies directly conflict with the eradiction policy of the United States. In 2008 the Bolivian government suspended the operations of the US Drug Enforcement Administration (DEA) accusing the organisation of being a front for violating the country's sovereignty and supporting an unsuccessful coup d'état. Bolivia's government also expelled the US ambassador. In 2008 Gustavo Guzmán, the Bolivian ambassador to Washington said "The U.S. embassy is historically used to calling the shots in Bolivia, violating our sovereignty, treating us like a banana republic", and Evo Morales, then Bolivian president said "Where there is a US ambassador, there is a coup".: Bolivia has an embassy in Washington, D.C., and consulates-general in Los Angeles, Miami and New York City.; United States has an embassy in La Paz.
Uruguay	1 November 1843	See Bolivia–Uruguay relations Both countries established diplomatic relations on 1 November 1843.: Bolivia has an embassy in Montevideo.; Uruguay has an embassy in La Paz and a consulate-general in Santa Cruz de Sierra.
Venezuela	14 September 1883	See Bolivia–Venezuela relations Both countries established diplomatic relations on 14 September 1883. On November 15, 2019, the Interim President of Bolivia Jeanine Áñez severed the diplomatic relations with Venezuela and accused Venezuelans with ties to that country's embassy in La Paz of "plotting against internal security" in Bolivia. On November 12, 2020, President Luis Arce reestablished diplomatic relations with Venezuela.

=== Asia ===
Country	Formal Relations Began	Notes
Azerbaijan	8 July 1996	Both countries established diplomatic relations on 8 July 1996.: Azerbaijan is accredited to Bolivia from its embassy in Buenos Aires, Argentina.
China	9 July 1985	See Bolivia–China relations Both countries established diplomatic relations on 9 July 1985. Since the establishment of diplomatic ties between China and Bolivia in 1985, relations have expanded from economic and cultural ties to military, transport, infrastructure, raw materials, education and other areas. The two countries recently celebrated 25th anniversary of diplomatic ties in Beijing, July 9, 2010. In August 2010, China and Bolivia agreed to continue to develop military ties and cooperation.: Bolivia has an embassy in Beijing.; China has an embassy in La Paz.
India	1958	See Bolivia–India relations Both countries established diplomatic relations in 1958.: Bolivia has an embassy in New Delhi.; India has an embassy in La Paz.
Indonesia	1963	Both countries established diplomatic relations in 1963.: Bolivia is accredited to Indonesia from its embassy in Beijing, China.; Indonesia is accredited to Bolivia from its embassy in Lima, Peru.
Iran	8 September 2007	See Bolivia–Iran relations Both countries established diplomatic relations on 8 September 2007. Relations between Iran and Bolivia were strengthened during the presidencies of Evo Morales and Mahmoud Ahmadinejad. Morales supported Iran's right to peaceful nuclear energy, while Iran has expanded economic relations and investments in Bolivia. Morales visited Iran more than once.: Bolivia has an embassy in Tehran.; Iran has an embassy in La Paz.
Israel	3 July 1957, Severed in January 2009, Restored on 28 November 2019, Severed on 31 October 2023, Restored on 9 December 2025	See Bolivia–Israel relations In January 2009, under the administration from the Movimiento al Socialismo (MAS) Bolivia limited its relations with Israel in the wake of Israeli strikes in Gaza in response to rocket attacks on Israel. Bolivia reportedly promised to take Israel to an international court for alleged war crimes committed against Palestinians in Gaza. On 30 July 2014, Bolivian relations with Israel were further strained. During the 2014 Israel–Gaza conflict, Bolivian President Evo Morales declared Israel a "terrorist state" for alleged human rights abuses against Palestinians. Following this, Morales canceled a 30-year agreement that allowed Israelis to visit Bolivia without visas. Following a political crisis, the interim Jeanine Áñez presidency once again normalized relations with Israel. After the landslide elections in October 2020 ousted Áñez from the presidency, Vice President David Choquehuanca reasserted Bolivia's commitment to the Palestinian cause, saying, "the crimes committed by the Zionist regime, especially against civilians, especially women and children, should not be forgotten, but rather tried in an exemplary manner." Severed diplomatic relations in 2009 and Restored on 28 November 2019. On 31 October 2023 nowly the MAS government, Bolivia severed diplomatic ties with Israel in the wake of Israel's attack on the Gaza Strip. Israel and Bolivia renew diplomatic relations on 9 December 2025 after defeat and departure to MAS in the 2025 Bolivian general election
Japan	3 April 1914	See Bolivia–Japan relations Both countries established diplomatic relations on 3 April 1914.: Bolivia has an embassy in Tokyo.; Japan has an embassy in La Paz and a consular office in Santa Cruz de la Sierra.
Malaysia	1977	Both countries established diplomatic relations in 1977.: Bolivia is accredited to Malaysia from its embassy in Tokyo, Japan.; Malaysia is accredited to Bolivia from its embassy in Lima, Peru.
Philippines	7 January 1970	Both countries established diplomatic relations on 7 January 1970.: Bolivia is accredited to the Philippines from its embassy in Tokyo, Japan.; Philippines is accredited to Bolivia from its embassy in Buenos Aires, Argentina and has two honorary consulates in La Paz and Santa Cruz de la Sierra.
South Korea	25 April 1965	Both countries established diplomatic relations on 25 April 1965.: Bolivia has an embassy in Seoul.; South Korea has an embassy in La Paz.
Turkey	26 July 1950	See Bolivia–Turkey relations Both countries established diplomatic relations on 26 July 1950.: Bolivia has an embassy in Ankara.; Turkey has an embassy in La Paz.; Trade volume between the two countries was US$130 million in 2019 (Bolivian exports/imports: 108/22 million USD).
Vietnam	10 February 1987	Both countries established diplomatic relations on 10 February 1987. Bolivia's embassy in Beijing, China, functions as the non-resident embassy to Vietnam. Vietnam is accredited to Bolivia, from its embassy in Brazil and has an honorary consulate in Santa Cuz de la Sierra.

=== Europe ===
Country	Formal Relations Began	Notes
Denmark		See Bolivia–Denmark relations: Bolivia is accredited to Denmark from its embassy in Berlin, Germany.; Denmark is accredited to Bolivia from its embassy in Bogotá, Colombia.
France	9 September 1833	Both countries established diplomatic relations on 9 September 1833 when has been appointed M. Buchet-Martigny as Chargé d'Affaires of France to Bolivia.: Bolivia has an embassy in Paris.; France has an embassy in La Paz.
Germany	16 May 1902	See Bolivia–Germany relations Both countries established diplomatic relations on 16 May 1902. After the Second World War, diplomatic relations were established with the Federal Republic of Germany on 30 December 1952. Diplomatic relations between the two states were broken during World War I. Relations were restored after the war under the agreement concluded on July 20, 1921.: Bolivia has an embassy in Berlin.; Germany has an embassy in La Paz.
Poland	3 September 1935	Both countries established diplomatic relations on 3 September 1935.: Bolivia is accredited to Poland from its embassy in Berlin, Germany.; Poland is accredited to Bolivia from its embassy in Lima, Peru.
Russia	9 August 1898	See Bolivia–Russia relations Both countries established diplomatic relations on 9 August 1898 and diplomatic relations between Bolivia and Soviet Union were established on 18 April 1945. With Bolivia the focus on relations with Russia is mainly economic, as opposed to political and strategic, as an agreement to invest in Bolivia's natural gas fields shows. It is seen to "help Latin America...[as it] expands Latin America's economic opportunities, diversifies its relationships...that's healthy." 2008 saw, as a first step to re-establish ties with Russia, the Bolivian government had plans to purchase a small batch of helicopters. Ambassador Leonid Golubev told The Associated Press that he would like to see Russia's ties to Bolivia one day "approach the level" of its growing partnership with Venezuela. In 2009 amid improving relations between the two countries Bolivia and Russia signed various agreements pertaining to energy and military ties, mining activities and illegal drug eradication.: Bolivia has an embassy in Moscow.; Russia has an embassy in La Paz.
Slovakia	1 January 1993	Both countries established diplomatic relations on 1 January 1993.: Bolivia is accredited to Slovakia from its embassy in Vienna, Austria.; Slovakia is accredited to Bolivia from its embassy in Buenos Aires, Argentina.
Spain	21 July 1847	See Bolivia–Spain relations Both countries established diplomatic relations on 21 July 1847. A diplomatic crisis with Spain in 2005 due to a misunderstanding was quickly resolved by Prime Minister José Luis Rodríguez Zapatero and Spain became the first European country visited by Evo Morales on January 4, 2006. However, there remain problems surrounding the exploitation of oil and gas fields in the country by Spanish corporations like Repsol. Bolivian President Evo Morales met King Juan Carlos and held talks with Zapatero during a visit to Spain in September 2009 with the intention of resolving issues concerning the nationalisation of the Bolivian energy sector. The move has the potential to hurt some Spanish companies however relations were said to be "positive" between the Bolivian state and Spanish private sector energy companies. Evo Morales said that Bolivia is ready to accept outside investment in its energy and natural resource industries as long as foreign firms do not act as owners and that Bolivia is "looking for investment, be it from private or state sector. We want partners, not owners of our natural resources." It was suggested that Bolivia would also negotiate with Spanish companies to produce car parts and lithium batteries in the future.: Bolivia has an embassy and a consulate in Madrid, a consulate-general in Barcelona and consulates in Bilbao, Murcia, Seville and Valencia and vice-consulates in Granada and Palma.; Spain has an embassy in La Paz and a consulate-general in Santa Cruz de la Sierra.
United Kingdom	14 April 1848	See Bolivia–United Kingdom relations Foreign Office Minister Hugo Swire with Ambassador of Bolivia to the United Kingdom Roberto Calzadilla in London, March 2014. The UK established diplomatic relations with the United Kingdom on 29 September 1840.: Bolivia maintains an embassy in London.; The United Kingdom is accredited to Bolivia through its embassy in La Paz.; Both countries share common membership of the International Criminal Court, the United Nations, and the World Trade Organization. Bilaterally the two countries have a Double Taxation Convention.

== See also ==
- Bolivia and the International Monetary Fund
- Foreign policy of Evo Morales
- List of diplomatic missions in Bolivia
- List of diplomatic missions of Bolivia
- Foreign aid to Bolivia
