= Bolivia–Libya relations =

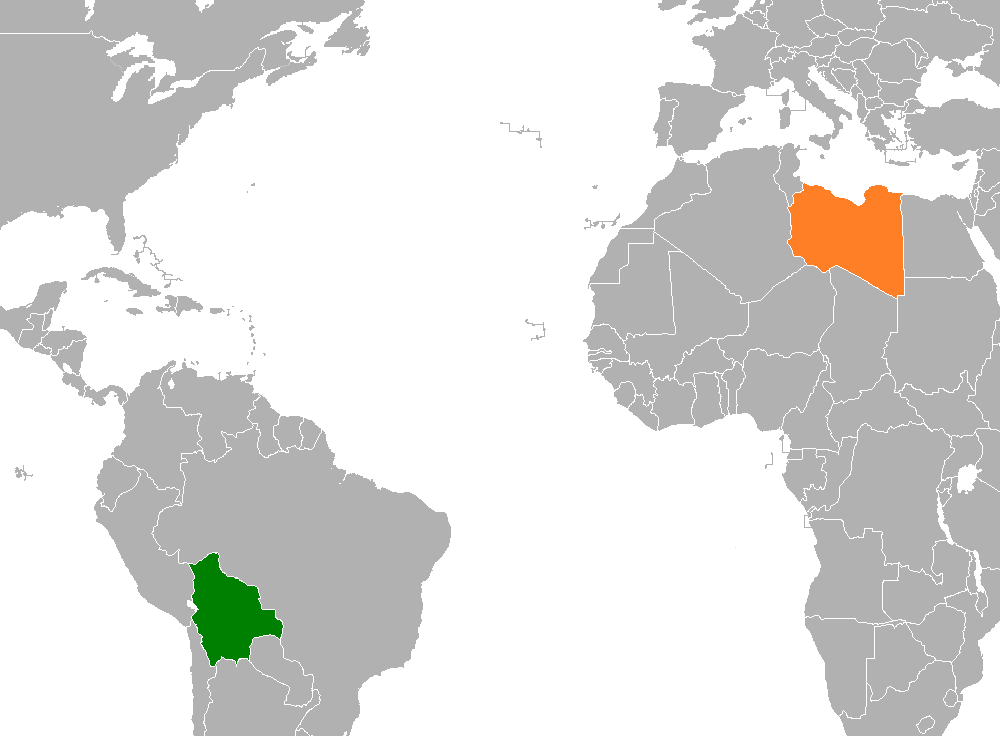

- Bolivia: Libya

Bolivia–Libya relations are the bilateral relations between Plurinational State of Bolivia and Libya. The two countries are members of the Group of 77, Non-Aligned Movement and the United Nations.

== History ==
Both countries established diplomatic relations on 13 August 2008.

Following Libya's establishment of diplomatic relations on August 13 and Libyan ambassador to Bolivia, Ali Farfar's, announcement of US$80 million in investments, Morales attended the thirty-ninth anniversary of the Libyan Revolution, where he met the Libyan leader Colonel Muammar al-Gaddafi at Benghazi. In Libya he secured support for his government and for democratic change in Bolivia, more active trade, energy cooperation and improved diplomatic relations. The secretary of the Popular Congress, Muftah Queepe, said Libya ratified its support for the revolutionary and democratic process Morales was applying in Bolivia. Queepe praised Gaddafi's philosophy of Islamic socialism. Along with Iran, he also secured Libyan investment in Bolivia's hydrocarbons industry which, despite substantial energy reserves, was struggling to meet a commitment to pump natural gas to Argentina and Brazil.

== Resident diplomatic missions ==
- Libya is accredited to Bolivia from its embassy in Brasília.
- Bolivia is accredited to Libya from its embassy in Cairo.

== See also ==
- Foreign policy of the Evo Morales administration
- Foreign relations of Bolivia
- List of diplomatic missions in Bolivia
- List of diplomatic missions of Bolivia
- Foreign relations of Libya
- List of diplomatic missions of Libya
- List of diplomatic missions in Libya
