= Bolivia–Paraguay relations =

- Bolivia: Paraguay

Bolivia–Paraguay relations are the bilateral relations between Bolivia and Paraguay. Both nations are members of the Community of Latin American and Caribbean States, Latin American Integration Association, Mercosur, Organization of Ibero-American States, Organization of American States, and the United Nations.

== History ==
Initially, both modern states of Bolivia and Paraguay were part of the Viceroyalty of the Río de la Plata. In 1932, both countries broke their diplomatic relations and entered into a disastrous war called the Chaco War, which would last 3 years, until 1935. This war caused serious economic, social, and political consequences for both countries, thus delaying way its development. In 1938, a Peace Treaty was definitively signed between the two nations and the subsequent delimitation of borders.

== Diplomatic missions ==
- Bolivia has an embassy in Asunción.
- Paraguay has an embassy in La Paz, a consulate-general in Santa Cruz de la Sierra and a consulate in Villamontes.
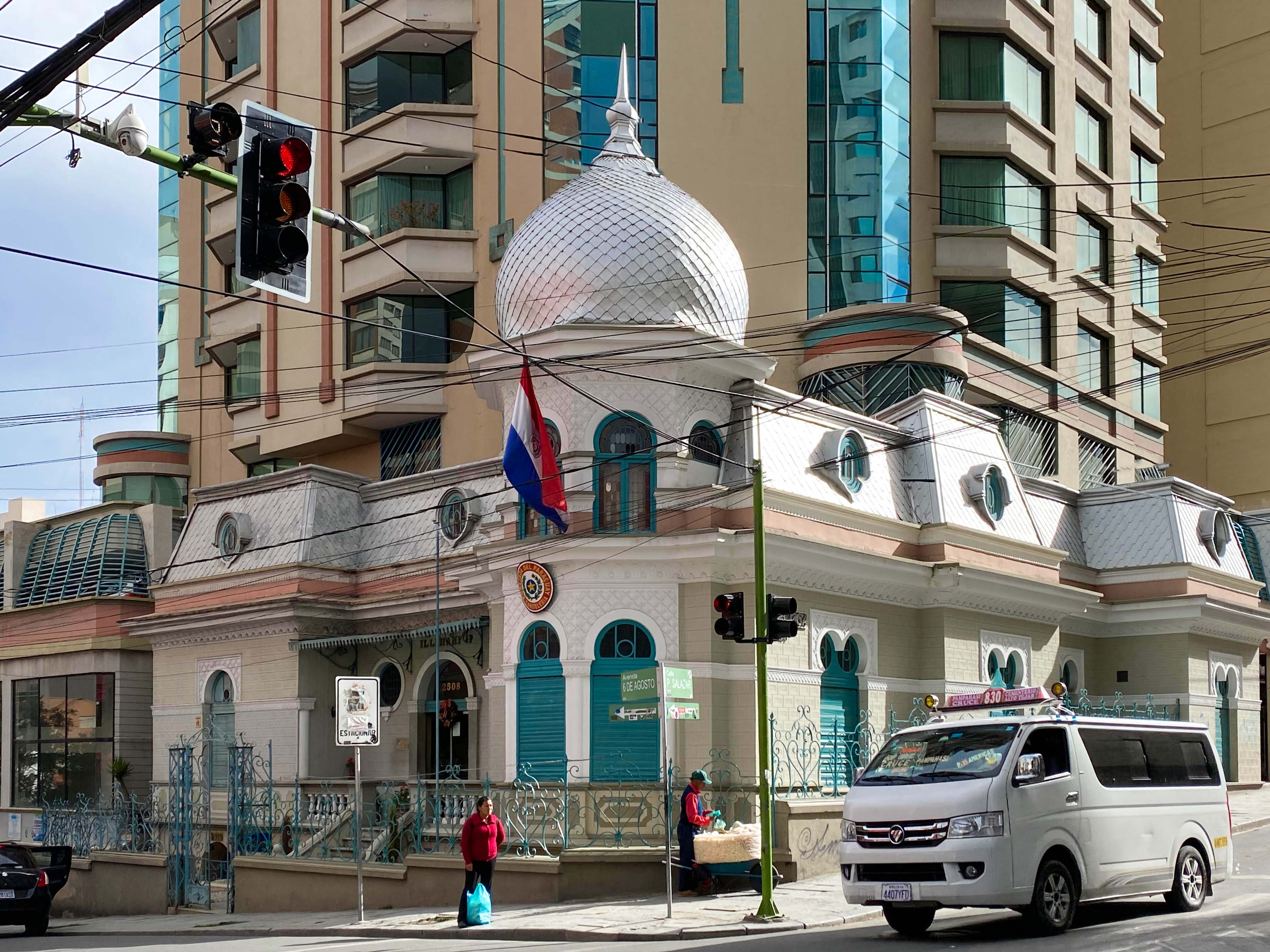
Embassy of Paraguay in La Paz

== See also ==
- Chaco War
- Foreign relations of Bolivia
- Foreign relations of Paraguay
- Cement industry in Bolivia
