= Eduardo Pardo =

Bolivian economist and diplomat (1953–2022)

Ambassador of Bolivia to Cuba
- In office 21 July 2021 – 13 February 2022
- Preceded by: Ariana Campero

Personal details
- Born: 5 May 1953 Sucre, Bolivia
- Died: 13 February 2022 (aged 68) Havana, Cuba
- Party: Socialist Party-1
- Education: University of Saint Francis Xavier

Eduardo Pardo (5 May 1953 – 13 February 2022) was a Bolivian economist and diplomat who served as the Bolivian ambassador to Cuba from 2021 until his death in 2022.
