= Túpac Katari 1 =

Telecommunication satellite

Túpac Katari 1 or TKSat-1 is a telecommunications satellite that the government of Bolivia outsourced to People's Republic of China (PRC) to serve telecommunications in Bolivia, such as mobile, television and Internet use.

It was launched into orbit on 20 December 2013 from the Satellite Launch Center in Xichang, China, with a trial period of a little over three months, and commercial operation starting in March 2014.

It was built on behalf of the Bolivian Space Agency. The China Great Wall Industry Corporation (CGWIC), a subsidiary of the China Aerospace Science and Technology Corporation (CASC), was responsible for the construction (using French, German and USA technology), launch and orbit of the satellite.

The satellite is named after 18th century Bolivian independence activist Túpac Katari.

== Technical issues ==
The satellite is geostationary and parked at 87.2° W, at a distance of 36,000 kilometers from equator; two-way voice communications are subject to latency.

The estimated useful life is 15 years; having been launched in 2013, it should be deactivated in 2028.

== Cost and revenue ==
The satellite had a cost of around $300 million, of which $251 million was a loan from the China Development Bank (CDB) to the government of Bolivia, and the rest was paid by the government of Bolivia.

From launch to August 2017, the satellite generated revenue of $60 million. The Bolivian Space Agency said the satellite was not a business, but instead its purpose was to increase access to communications. Running expenses were not disclosed.

== See also ==
- 2013 in spaceflight
- Bolivia-People's Republic of China relations
