= Bolivia–Venezuela relations =

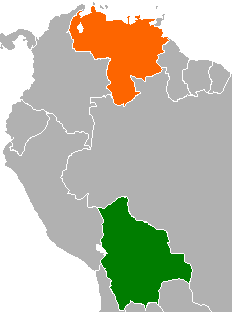
- Bolivia: Venezuela

Diplomatic mission
- Bolivian Embassy, Caracas: Venezuelan Embassy, La Paz

Envoy
- Ambassador Sebastián Rodrigo Michel Hoffmann: Ambassador Alexander Gabriel Yáñez Deleuze

Relations between the Plurinational State of Bolivia and the Bolivarian Republic of Venezuela were established on 14 September 1883 under the government administrations of the President of Bolivia Narciso Campero Leyes and the President of Venezuela Antonio Guzmán Blanco.

Located in South America, both countries are full members of the Organization of American States (OAS), the United Nations Economic Commission for Latin America and the Caribbean (ECLAC), and the Ibero-American Community of Nations (CIN). In November 2019, the interim government of President Jeanine Áñez broke diplomatic relations with the presidency of Nicolás Maduro, recognizing interim President Juan Guaidó in his place. However, a year later, the constitutional government of President Luis Arce decided to reestablish relations with Venezuela in November 2020.

Both states have been generally supportive of Russia, China, Cuba, and Iran. However, following his victory in the 2025 general election, Bolivian President Rodrigo Paz has sought to strengthen relations with the United States.

== History ==
=== Spanish domain ===
Both Latin American nations share a common past. The current Bolivian and Venezuelan territories were part of the Spanish Empire and were administered separately as the province of Charcas (later Upper Peru) and the Captaincy General of Venezuela, respectively. Spanish is an official language in both countries.

=== 21st century ===
Under the presidency of Evo Morales, bilateral relations with the administrations of Hugo Chávez and later Nicolás Maduro strengthened due to ideological commonalities. Both countries remained active members of the Bolivarian Alliance for the Peoples of Our America (ALBA-TCP) until Bolivia left the organization in November 2019.

During the interim presidency of Jeanine Áñez, the country broke diplomatic relations with the presidency of Nicolás Maduro, and recognized Juan Guaidó as interim president of Venezuela.

One day after the resignation of the government of Evo Morales on 10 November 2019, hooded men armed with dynamite took over the Venezuelan embassy in La Paz for a few hours. On 15 November 2019, the constitutional president of Bolivia, Jeanine Áñez, broke diplomatic relations with the government of Nicolás Maduro, recognizing Juan Guaidó in his place. On 16 November of the same year, a group of Venezuelan opponents met outside the Bolivian embassy in Caracas to give their support for Añez. Juan Guaidó held a video conference with Jeanine Áñez on the same day to express their mutual support.

== Cooperation ==
During its economic boom driven by high oil prices, Venezuela cooperated with Bolivia by donating tractors, heavy machinery, asphalt, airplanes, helicopters, ambulances, computers, vehicles, and motorcycles for the Bolivian Police and presidential security. Likewise, Venezuelan cooperation financed the renovation of several Bolivian barracks and provided the initial impetus for the "Bolivia Cambia, Evo Cumple" (Bolivia Changes, Evo Meets) program, funding it from 2007 to 2011.

=== Agricultural area ===
In February 2007, Venezuelan President Hugo Chávez Frías gave Bolivia 320 new "VENIRAN" brand tractors (of Venezuelan-Iranian design) from a factory in Ciudad Bolivar, Bolívar State, to develop and strengthen agriculture in Bolivian rural areas. Bolivian President Evo Morales Ayma distributed those 320 tractors among the departments of La Paz, Cochabamba, Santa Cruz, Tarija, Beni and Oruro.

The tractor donation was valued at approximately $11.4 million, with each tractor worth around $35,000. Shortly after, the mayors of the various Bolivian municipalities that received the donation complained to the Bolivian press that the tractors were incomplete and lacked their respective plows. The Ministry of Rural Development and Lands of Bolivia stated that municipal governments were already obligated to provide the missing accessories, since the cost of each plow did not exceed 800 dollars. In the end, due to the lack of state control and municipal mismanagement, several of those Venezuelan tractors ended up in the hands of mayors, councilors, or public officials in various Bolivian municipalities.

=== Infrastructure area ===
In 2004, Venezuelan President Hugo Chávez donated 3,000 tons of asphalt to the mayor of La Paz to pave city streets. Former mayor Juan del Granado thanked the Venezuelan donation.

On 30 July 2007, Venezuela donated heavy machinery valued at about $12 million to help rebuild areas in the Department of Beni affected by natural disasters from the El Niño phenomenon. The heavy machinery donated to Beni included four excavators, three backhoes, four loaders, four compactors, two motor graders, two crawler loaders, 20 trucks, two vans, three water tanks with a capacity of 15,000 liters each, and funding for a 120-ton-per-hour asphalt processing plant.

=== Health area ===
In August 2009, Chávez provided 170 ambulances to improve the Bolivian health system. President Evo Morales Ayma distributed them to the 87 municipalities of the La Paz Department (two per municipality).

However, this donation drew harsh criticism from the Venezuelan opposition, as opponents accused then-President Chávez of giving ambulances to other countries while Venezuela faced a serious shortage. This shortage was reflected in the explosion at the Amuay oil refinery in Estado Falcón. Around 55 Venezuelans died, and more than 150 people were injured. In the absence of ambulances, the dead had to be transferred to morgues, piled up in old trucks and exposed to the open air.

Faced with this situation, Venezuelan opponents from Anzoátegui state appeared before the Bolivian Embassy in Caracas to ask Bolivia to return to Venezuela at least 20 ambulances of the 170 that had been given away. This request was never heard by the Bolivian government.

=== Security area ===
On 1 November 2008, Venezuelan President Hugo Chávez donated 16 late-model Toyota wagons valued at $552,000 (around $34,500 each) and six Kawasaki motorcycles to strengthen security for Bolivian President Evo Morales Ayma. On 4 May 2010, the Bolivian news media revealed that one of the vehicles donated by Chávez had been stolen while the presidential driver was buying bread, a revelation that sparked a national and international scandal. The Bolivian government admitted that a presidential security vehicle had been stolen due to the driver's carelessness but clarified that said stolen vehicle was not from the Venezuelan donation but had belonged to the Ministry of the Presidency since 1997.

=== Defense area ===
Venezuela's cooperation with Bolivia in the defense area dates back several decades. In 1973, during his first term, Venezuelan President Rafael Caldera Rodríguez donated nine used North American F-86 Sabre fighter jets to strengthen the Bolivian Air Force (FAB). In 1955, Venezuela had bought around 30 aircraft of this model from the United States, but by the early 1970s, the Venezuelan Air Force was already withdrawing them from air service due to their age. On 13 October 1973, the first six Venezuelan F-86 "Sabre" planes arrived in the city of La Paz. The remaining three arrived on 22 June 1974 under the dictatorship of Hugo Banzer. The FAB used these Venezuelan aircraft until 1994, when the first government of Bolivian President Gonzalo Sánchez de Lozada decided to withdraw them from service and sell them to private air show companies and collectors in the United States.

In 2003, Venezuelan President Hugo Chávez donated 11 used Beechcraft T-34 Mentor military training aircraft to strengthen the FAB. These aircraft (of American manufacture) flew for the first time in the United States during the 1950s and were acquired by Venezuela in the 1970s. The 11 T-34 aircraft arrived in Bolivia on 31 July 2004 during the government of then Bolivian President Carlos Mesa, who thanked Venezuela for the donation. Venezuelan aircraft were used by the FAB, flying for about 15 more years until 2018, when the decision was made to withdraw them from service due to their excessive age and lack of spare parts.

On 28 May 2006, Chávez decided to give two Eurocopter AS332 "Super Puma" (of French manufacture) to Bolivia to equip and strengthen the Bolivian presidential transport; on 1 March 2006, a helicopter carrying President Evo Morales Ayma had suffered serious damage when landing in Cochabamba due to the helicopter's age. The Venezuelan helicopters arrived in La Paz on 7 June 2006. One of the "Super Puma" helicopters crashed on 20 July 2008 in the town of Colomi during a flight from Cochabamba to Cobija. Four Venezuelan soldiers and one Bolivian died in the accident. During that time, sectors related to the MAS-IPSP described the event as an attempt on the life of President Evo Morales Ayma; however, the FAB ruled out any hypothesis of an alleged attack.

On 28 February 2007, Chávez decided to give away two more Aérospatiale SA316 "Alouette III" helicopters (of French manufacture) to Bolivia, to help with humanitarian rescue and relief efforts during the floods that the Beni Department was suffering that year.

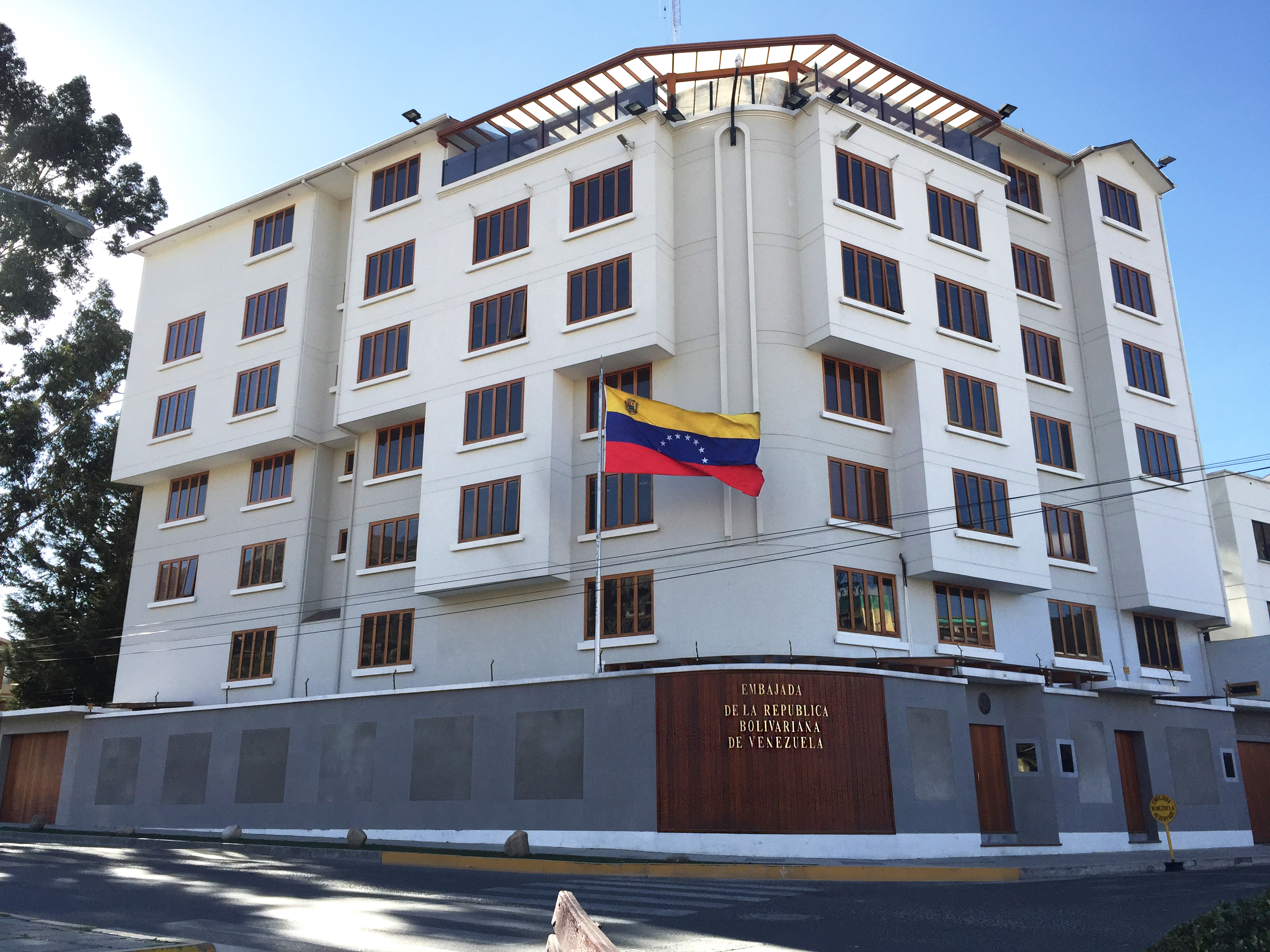
Embassy of Venezuela in La Paz, Bolivia

That same year, one of the "Alouette III" helicopters crashed on 28 June 2008 in the Molle Molle area in the south of the city of Cochabamba. In the accident, four Bolivian soldiers and one Venezuelan were killed. At the time, the Bolivian opposition harshly criticized the government of Evo Morales for receiving old helicopters in poor condition, since the crashed helicopter was manufactured in 1972 and, by 2007, was more than 35 years old. In turn, the Venezuelan embassy in Bolivia indicated that Venezuela would not donate defective helicopters where the lives of Venezuelan military personnel would also be put at risk. In the face of the national scandal, President Evo Morales Ayma limited himself to asking the FAB for a detailed report and a detailed description of the plane crash, to take new measures.

== Resident diplomatic missions ==
- Bolivia has an embassy in Caracas.
- Venezuela has an embassy in La Paz.

== See also ==
- Cement industry in Bolivia
