= Foreign aid to Bolivia =

Overview of aid

In 1998 the World Bank and International Monetary Fund awarded Bolivia a debt relief package worth US$760 million. Bolivia has also received relief under the World Bank's Heavily Indebted Poor Countries program, which, if Bolivia meets all checkpoints, will total US$1.2 billion by 2011. In 2004, the United States designated more than US$150 million for assistance to Bolivia.

Under President Evo Morales, Spain has agreed to forgive $120 million (99 million Euro) in Bolivian debt on the condition that the money go towards developing educational programs.

== See also ==
- Foreign relations of Bolivia
