= Bolivian Space Agency =

National space agency of Bolivia

- Agencia Boliviana Espacial

Agency overview
- Abbreviation: ABE
- Formed: 10 February 2010
- Type: Space agency
- Official language: Spanish
- Administrator: Iván Zambrana
- Owner: Government of Bolivia
- Website: www.abe.bo

The Bolivian Space Agency (Spanish: Agencia Boliviana Espacial, ABE) is the national space agency of Bolivia. Established in 2010, the agency is responsible for developing and implementing communications satellite programs and other space projects. On 20 December 2013, the ABE oversaw the launch of the nation's first artificial satellite, Túpac Katari 1. The satellite began operating the following year, providing telecommunication services to rural Bolivia.

== History ==
On 10 February 2010, President Evo Morales signed a decree establishing the Bolivian Space Agency as a government agency under the jurisdiction of the Ministry of Public Works, Services and Housing. The agency was tasked with promoting and developing satellite projects, and implementing their application in education, health and weather forecasting programs. The ABE began with a modest initial budget of US$1 million, with the Bolivian government planning to seek further funding through donations and loans from China and other countries.

=== Túpac Katari 1 ===
The agency oversaw the launch of Túpac Katari 1—Bolivia's first artificial satellite—on 20 December 2013. The communications satellite was named for Túpac Katari, an 18th-century Aymara native who led a rebellion against the Spanish Empire. The satellite was built by China Great Wall Industrial Corporation at a cost of US$302 million, 85% of which was provided by a China Development Bank loan. It was launched into orbit from the Xichang Satellite Launch Center in China.

Túpac Katari 1 began operation in March 2014. According to President Morales, the satellite would lower the cost of Internet, television and phone services in the country. The satellite also improved communications access in rural parts of the country, providing remote education (via teleconferencing and educational television) and telemedicine programs.

The director of the Bolivian Space Agency, Iván Zambrana, reported in 2018 that the satellite's services had raised over US$80 million in the first four years of operation. According to Zambrana, this amount of revenue exceeded the agency's expectations, and would allow the satellite to be fully paid off within fifteen years.

== See also ==
- Bolivia–China relations
- List of government space agencies
