= Bolivia–Turkey relations =

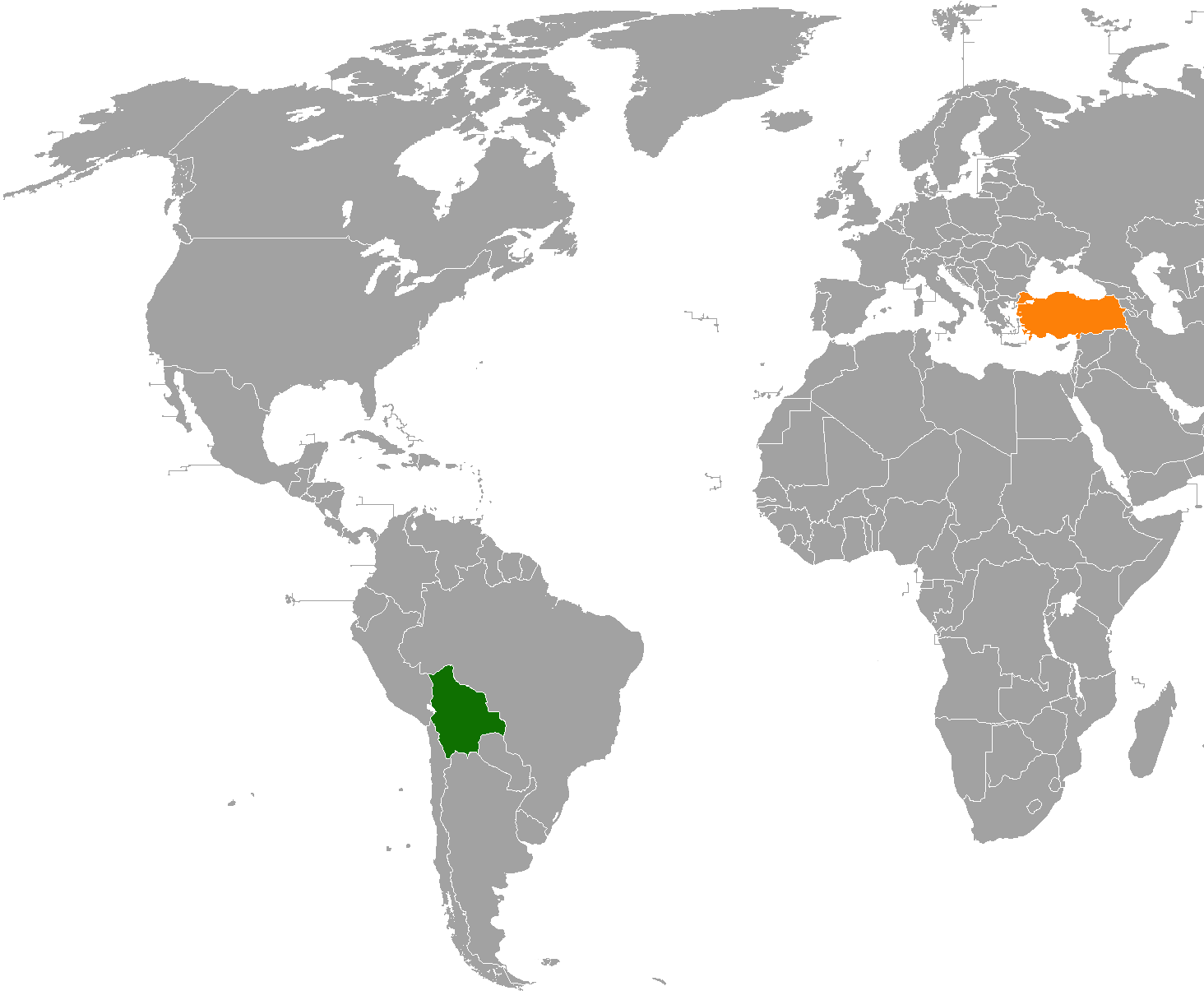
- Bolivia: Turkey

Bolivia–Turkey relations are foreign relations between Bolivia and Turkey. Turkey has had an embassy in La Paz since February 14, 2018. In September 2022, Bolivia opened an embassy in Ankara.

== Agreements ==
The two countries signed an agreement on visa exemption in 2000. An economic and commercial cooperation agreement was signed in 2011.

== Presidential visits ==
The official visit of former President Evo Morales to Turkey on 9 April 2019 was the first presidential visit between the two countries.

Guest	Host	Place of visit	Date of visit
(Bolivia) President Evo Morales	(Turkey) President Recep Tayyip Erdoğan	Presidential Complex, Ankara	9 April 2019

== Economic relations ==
The trade volume between the two countries was approximately 130 million USD (Turkey’s exports: 22 million USD, Turkey’s imports: 108 million USD) by the end of 2019.

== See also ==
- Foreign relations of Bolivia
- Foreign relations of Turkey
