= Bolivia–South Africa relations =

- Bolivia: South Africa

Bolivian–South Africa relations are the bilateral relations between Bolivia and South Africa. South Africa was accredited to Bolivia through its embassy in Lima, Peru until its closure in 2021.

== Political relations ==
- January 2006 - Bolivia's president-elect Evo Morales visits South Africa as part of his round the world tour ahead of taking up the presidency after Bolivia's 2005 elections, after Morales states that South Africa's struggle against apartheid was similar to the political struggle in Bolivia.
- July 2006 - South Africa sends a follow-up delegation to Bolivia led by Minister in the Presidency, Essop Pahad to cooperate and share experiences on constitutional assemblies as well as minerals and energy policies.
- June 2010 - President Morales visits South Africa during the 2010 FIFA World Cup where he meets with South African Vice-President Kgalema Motlanthe to discuss enhancing trade and diplomatic relations.
- February 2025 - Bolivia joins South Africa’s genocide case against Israel at the International Court of Justice (ICJ).

== See also ==
- Foreign relations of Bolivia
- Foreign relations of South Africa
