= Bolivia–Denmark relations =

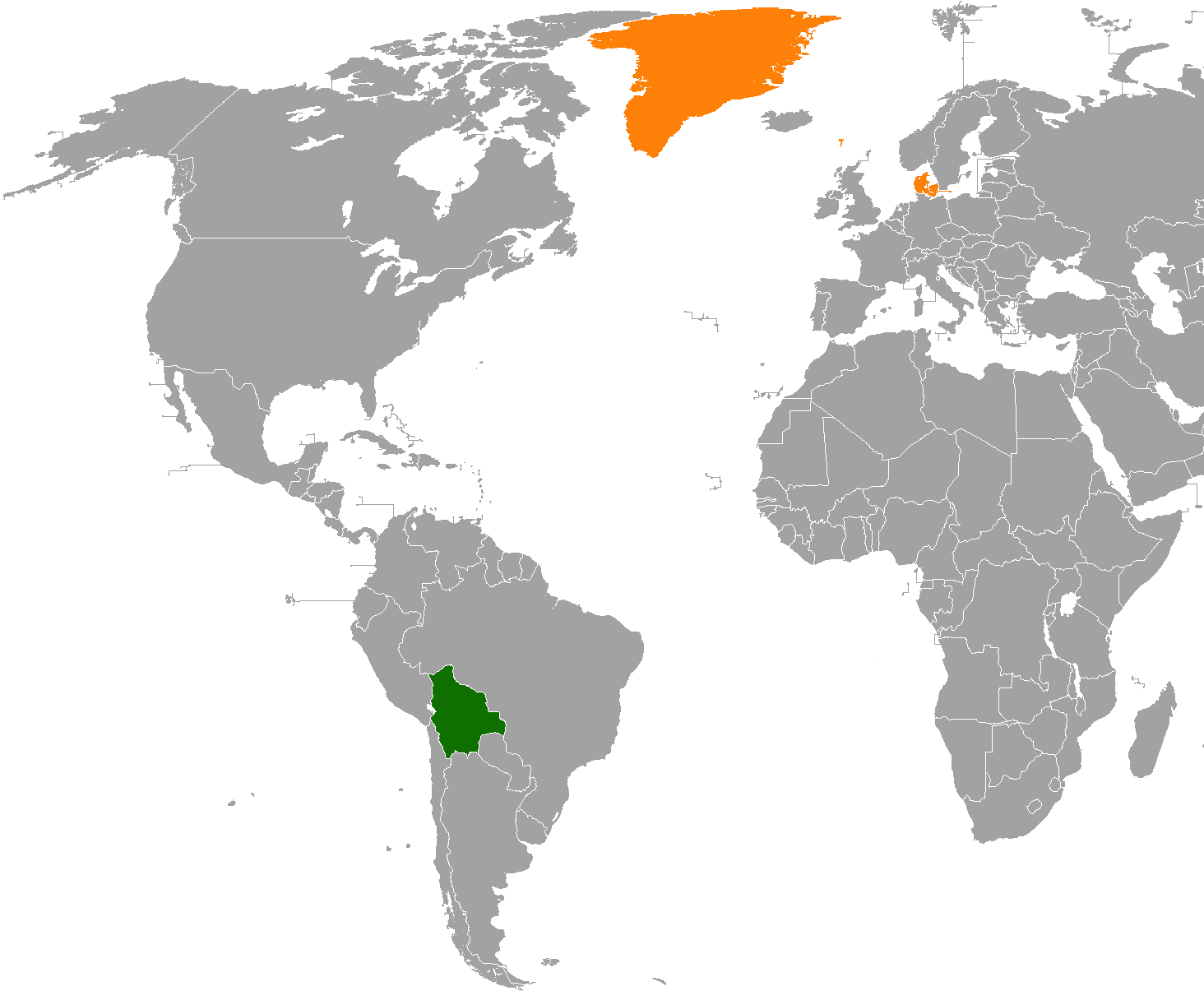
- Bolivia: Denmark

Bolivia–Denmark relations refers to bilateral relations between Bolivia and Denmark. Bolivia is accredited to Denmark from its embassy in Berlin, Germany. Denmark is accredited to Bolivia from its embassy in Bogotá, Colombia.

== History ==
Diplomatic relations were established on 28 February 1930. On 9 November 1931, a commercial treaty was signed, to further develop commercial relations between Bolivia and Denmark. In 1974, an agreement on a Danish loan to Bolivia was signed. In 1977, another agreement on a loan to Bolivia was signed. In August 2000, Bolivia and Denmark signed a Mining–Environment accord, an agreement to reduce the environmental and social effects in some Bolivian towns. Denmark is assisting Bolivia with $1.54 million for the agreement.

In 2006, when the Bolivian President Evo Morales ordered the Bolivian gas resources to be nationalized, the Danish Development Minister Ulla Tørnæs threatened to stop the assistance, because it is not compatible with the Danish development assistance. In December 2009, Bolivian President Evo Morales visited Denmark for the 2009 United Nations Climate Change Conference. After the conference, Bolivia accused the United States and Denmark for cutting the aid to Bolivia because of their opposition to the Copenhagen Accord. In 2009, when Morales tried to lift a ban on coca in the United Nations treaty Single Convention on Narcotic Drugs, Denmark with some other countries opposed the idea.

Bolivia was chosen as a programme country for Denmark in 1994, because Bolivia was the poorest country in South America. Denmark started assisting Bolivia with diaries. Because of the political situation in Bolivia, Denmark suspended the assistance in 1980. In 1993 the cooperation resumed. Danish development assistance to Bolivia focuses on democracy, human rights, agriculture, education and environment. In 2005, DANIDA cut the aid from 200 million to 150 million because of the social problems in Bolivia. In 2010, after 13 years of cooperation, the assistance for indigenous people ended.

== Trade ==
In 2008, Danish exports to Bolivia amounted 51 million DKK, and Bolivian exports amounted 6 million DKK.

== See also ==
- Foreign relations of Bolivia
- Foreign relations of Denmark
