= Foreign policy of the Evo Morales administration =

The foreign policy of the Evo Morales administration concerns the policy initiatives made towards other states by the former president of Bolivia, in difference to past, or future, Bolivian foreign policy. Morales' foreign policy can be roughly divided between that of the Americas (led by the United States and Canada) and the rest of the world.

== World tour ==
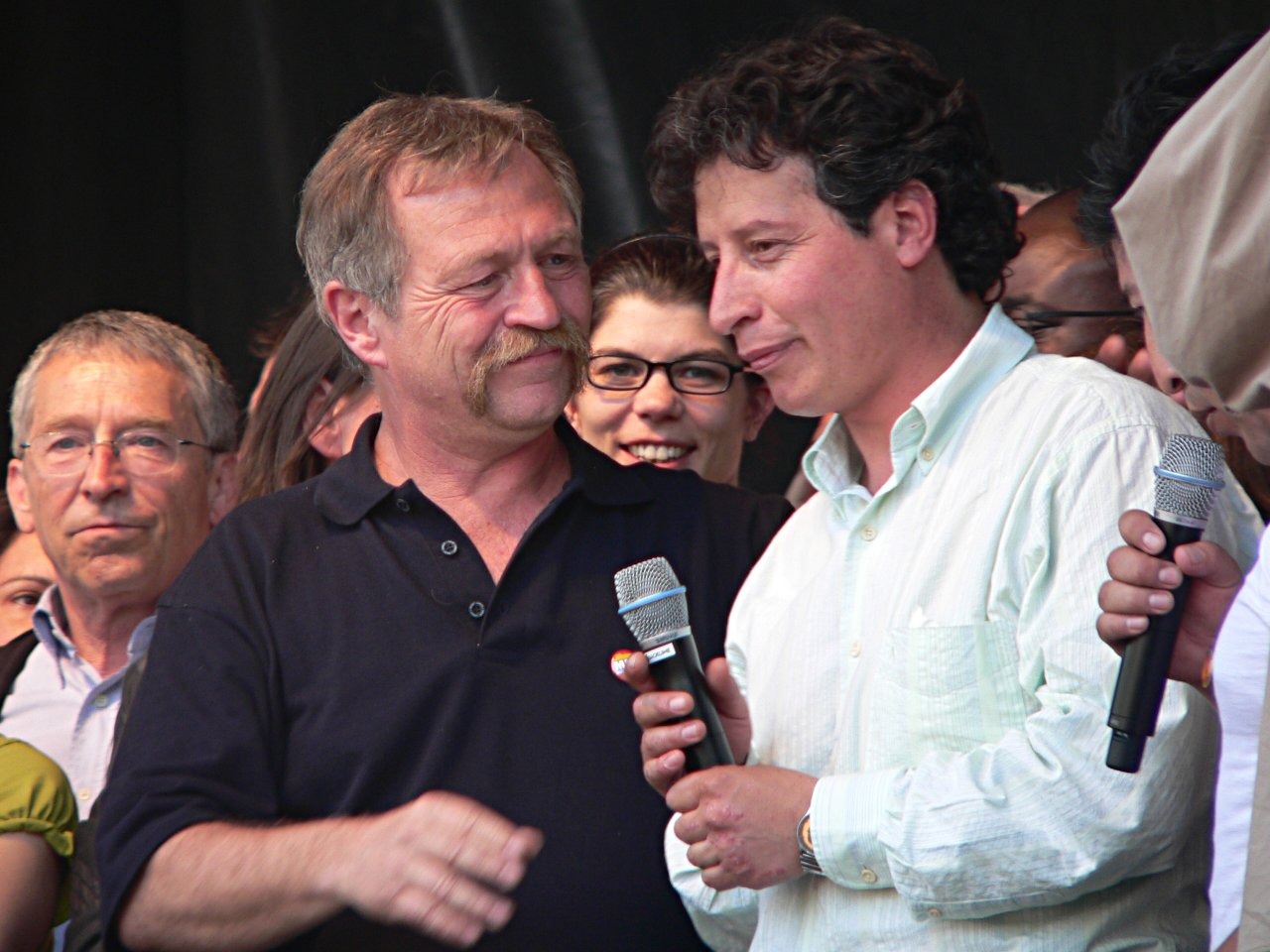
2007 French presidential election, Evo Morales supported José Bové, an altermondialist candidate; here Bové is at a meeting with Morales' envoy, Bolivian elected official César Navarro Miranda

From December 29, 2005, Evo Morales undertook an international tour described by Latin American media as exceptional. For two weeks, Morales visited several countries in search of political and economic support for his agenda for the transformation of Bolivia. This tour is said to have constituted a break with decades of tradition in which the first international destination visited by a president-elect in Bolivia was the United States. His itinerary also reinforced the view that his election was part of a strengthening of "anti-imperialist" governments and movements in Latin America.

In September 2006, he spoke at the United Nations General Assembly, holding a coca leaf, saying:

‘I should like to take this opportunity to speak of another historical injustice: the criminalization of the coca leaf. This coca leaf is green, not white, like cocaine. The coca leaf is symbolic of Andean culture, of the Andean environment and of the hopes of peoples. It is not acceptable that the coca leaf be legal for Coca-Cola and illegal for medicinal consumption not only in our country but throughout the world.

‘The United Nations should be aware that scientific studies have been carried out in American and European universities that have shown that the coca leaf has no negative effects on human health. I am very sorry that because some have a drug habit, the coca leaf has become illegal. We are aware of that. That is why, as coca leaf producers, we have stated that there will not be unfettered coca leaf production, but neither will there be zero production. Conditionality-based policies implemented in the past focused on zero coca-leaf production. But zero coca-leaf production is equivalent to zero Quechuas, zero Aymarás, zero Mojeños, zero Chiquitanos. All of that ended with another Government. We are an underdeveloped country with economic problems resulting from the pillage of our natural resources. We are here today to begin to regain our dignity and the dignity of our country.

‘In that context, I wish to say that the best contribution to combating drug trafficking has been through an agreed, voluntary reduction, with no deaths or injuries. I was pleased to hear that the United Nations report recognizes the honest and responsible effort that has been made to combat drug trafficking. Drug seizures have increased 300 per cent. However, yesterday I heard the United States Government state that it would not accept coca cultivation and that it was imposing conditions on us so that we would change our system.

— Evo Morales, at the UN General Assembly, September 19, 2006

In September 2007, Morales appeared on "The Daily Show with Jon Stewart". There he discussed various political issues. Morales was only the second sitting head of state to appear on the show and the first to be interviewed on the show using a translator.

On April 28, 2008, again he addressed the United Nations at the inauguration of the UN's VII Indigenous Forum UNPFII - United Nations Permanent Forum on Indigenous Issues, with his proposed 10 Commandments to save the Planet, summarized as:

1. In order to save the planet, the capitalist model must be eradicated and the North pay its ecological debt, rather than the countries of the South and throughout the world continuing to pay their external debts.
2. Denounce and PUT AN END to war, which only brings profits for empires, transnationals, and a few families, but not for peoples. The million and millions of dollars destined to warfare should be invested in the Earth, which has been hurt as a result of misuse and overexploitation.
3. Develop relations of coexistence, rather than domination, among countries in a world without imperialism or colonialism. Bilateral and multilateral relations are important because we belong to a culture of dialogue and social coexistence, but those relationships should not be of submission of one country to another.
4. Water is a human right and a right for all living things on the planet. It is not possible that there be policies that permit the privatization of water.
5. Develop clean energies that are nature friendly; put an end to energy wastefulness. In 100 years we are doing away with the fossil fuels that have been created over millions of years. Avoid the promotion of agrofuels. It is incomprehensible that some governments and economic development models can set aside land to make luxury cars run, rather than using it to provide food for human beings. Promote debates with governments and create awareness that the earth must be used for the benefit of all human beings and not to produce agrofuels.
6. Respect for the mother Earth. Learn from the historic teachings of native and indigenous peoples with regard to the respect for the mother Earth. A collective social consciousness must be developed among all sectors of society, recognizing that the Earth is our mother.
7. Basic services, such as water, electricity, education, healthcare, communications, and collective transportation should all be considered human rights; they cannot be privatized but must rather be public services.
8. Consume what is necessary, give priority and consume what is produced locally, put an end to consumerism, waste, and luxury. It is incomprehensible that some families dedicate themselves to the search for luxury, when millions and millions of persons do not have the possibility to live well.
9. Promote cultural and economic diversity. We are very diverse and this is our nature. A plurinational state, in which everyone is included within that state – whites, browns, blacks, everyone.
10. We want everyone to be able to live well, which does not mean to live better at the expense of others. We must build a communitarian socialism that is in harmony with the Mother Earth.

=== Timeline of Morales World tour ===
- December 30, 2005: Evo Morales visits Cuba after celebrating his democratic victory in his base town of Orinoca. In Havana Morales receives full honors from Cuban president Fidel Castro. Morales signs a cooperation agreement between Bolivia and Cuba whereby Castro promises assistance to Bolivia in issues such as health and education. During his speech Morales describes Castro and Chávez as "the commanders of the forces for the liberation of the Americas and the world".
- January 3, 2006: He meets Hugo Chávez in Caracas. Chávez offers Bolivia 150 000 barrels of diesel per month to substitute the current imports made from other countries. In exchange, Bolivia promises to pay Venezuela with agriculture products from Bolivia.
- January 4, 2006: Spanish prime minister José Luis Rodríguez Zapatero receives Morales in the palace of La Moncloa. Zapatero announces the writing-off of Bolivia's debt with Spain, a sum of 120 million euros.
- January 5, 2006: Juan Carlos of Spain receives Morales in his palace at La Zarzuela. Conservative Spanish media criticizes Morales for dressing informally, wearing a sweater made of alpaca wool with Amerindian motifs and colors during his encounter with the king. At the same time José María Aznar shows through his private fund-raising organization his criticism against Castro, Morales and Chávez.
- January 6, 2006: Morales meets French president Jacques Chirac in Paris. Chirac promises economic and political support as long as French investments in Bolivia are protected. The same day he meets Dutch Foreign Minister Ben Bot who promises aid of €15 million a year.
- January 7, 2006: Morales meets Javier Solana in Brussels, who also promises economic support for Bolivia in return for protection of European investments in Bolivia.
- January 9, 2006: Morales meets Hu Jintao and the Chinese Minister of Commerce Bo Xilai. Morales invites entrepreneurs and the government of China to invest in projects of exploration and exploitation of gas, and to participate in the construction of gas refineries in Bolivia.
- January 10, 2006: Morales is received in Pretoria by South African president Thabo Mbeki. Morales compares the struggle of black Africans during Apartheid with the struggle of the Amerindians in the Americas.
- January 11, 2006: Morales meets with Archbishop Desmond Tutu, who describes him as a man of 'remarkable humility and warmth', as well as former president F.W. de Klerk.
- January 13, 2006: Morales visits Brazil and meets with President Luiz Inácio Lula da Silva, describing him as "comrade and brother". Morales and Lula agree to work together on a program of cooperation to end poverty.

== Relations with other Latin American governments ==
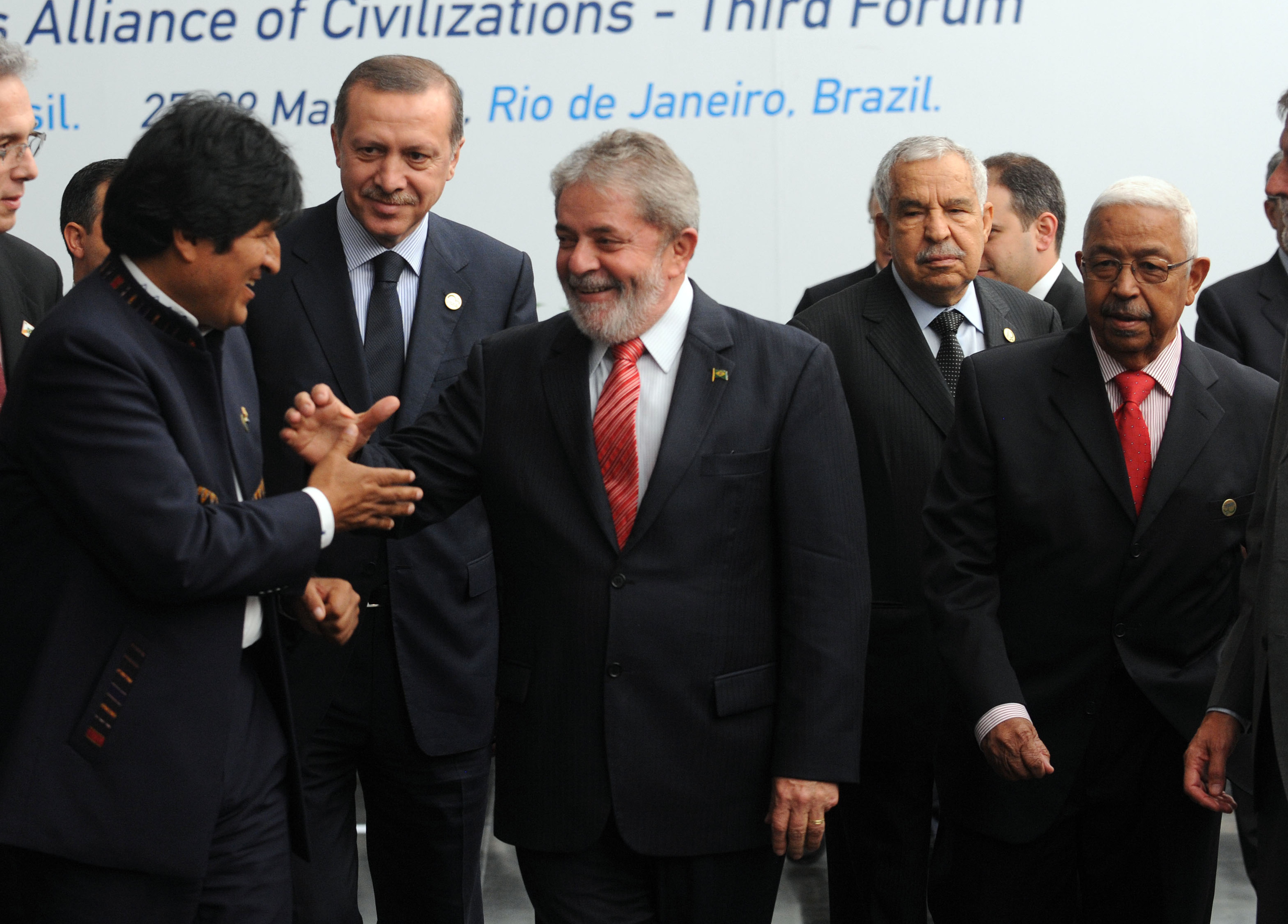
Evo Morales together with Turkish prime minister Tayyip Erdogan, Brazilian president Lula da Silva and Cape Verde's president Pires at the Alliance of Civilizations Forum.

A further boost with grassroots cross-South American support came when social organizations meeting in Lima supported Bolivia's negative by Colombia and Peru to bypass collective bargaining with the European Union. La Prensa, El Diario and La Razon reported that the leaders of 15 groups from Bolivia, Peru and Colombia summoned mobilizations demanding that agreements with the EU be negotiated as a bloc and that the association of the Community of Andean Nations be respected. They demanded a popular referendum be conducted in each of the four countries. The first such action of protest would be carried out in Lima, with other measures being coordinated for December. The said organizations also gave support to Bolivia for not having given up to transnationals the negotiation on strategic topics such as the national control over foreign investments and other issues.

=== UNASUR ===
Following the September 11, 2008, massacre in the northern department of Pando, an emergency meeting of the regional grouping UNASUR was called in Santiago, Chile. On September 15, 2008, the 12 countries that make up UNASUR declared their unanimous support for the government of Evo Morales and condemned attempts by the opposition to destabilise the country and attempt a "civil coup" by occupying public buildings.

=== OAS ===
As the date for the referendum on a new constitution approached, Morales asked members of the OAS to send election observers and to help with the repercussions to the vote for a new constitution. He said that he was "not too worried about the approval, but I'm concerned about the implementation."

=== Brazil ===
Brazil and Bolivia have been working on expanding and diversifying trade between the two countries in the last quarter of 2008. The 6th Meeting of the Commission for Monitoring Brazil-Bolivia trade was used to this end. As it stood, at the time Brazil was the main destination for exports from Bolivia, having bought, in 2007, 35.7% of the products that Bolivian companies sell to other countries. They were also the main exporter to Bolivia, sending 24.7% of products imported into Bolivia. As industrialized products represented 94.6% of Brazilian sales up to September of the year, Bolivian sales in the same period were limited largely to natural gas, which accounted for up to 92.7% of the total purchased from the country, or US$1.89 billion. The products with the greatest scope for an increase in trade from Brazil to Bolivia were crude oil, insecticides, aircraft, vehicle engines, soy in grain, vegetable oils and ironworks products, amongst others. From Bolivia to Brazil, products such as animal feed, vegetable oil, crude oil, tin, ores of precious metals, precious gems, dried and fresh fruit, plants, leather and garments were also capable of seeing sales grow.

=== Venezuela ===
Venezuelan relations with Bolivia were largely centered around personal relations with the Leftist leaders of the region. Hugo Chávez strongly supported Morales when he came under attack from the elite in the east of his country and the United States.

Following the rift with the United States, Venezuela came to Bolivia's rescue to double the country's textile exports from what it was selling to the U.S. under an agreement for lax duties that Washington suspended for the cessation of support in the war on drugs by Bolivia. Bolivian Vice Minister, Huáscar Ajta said at the first round of the Bolivia-Venezuela Business Fair in La Paz that the nearly $47 million in sales was agreed to "double what is being exported in textiles and manufacturing to United States via ATPDEA." Ajta also noted that total trade—the agreement would be signed within the framework of the Bolivarian Alternative for the Americas (ALBA) and the Trade Treaty of Peoples (TCP) – "is three times what Bolivia [had previously] exported to Venezuela in textiles and manufacturing." In like measure, the Venezuelan Minister of Production, Susana Rivero said that Venezuela "is not a substitute" for the United States, but "a new market with new conditions, with many facilities. This is an agreement that will allow the export sector – even if there is a financial crisis – to not be affected." The previous year U.S. imports from Bolivia totaled $362.6 million, including $73 million worth of jewelry and about $20 million of clothing and household textile goods, as well as $64 million of tin and $46 million of crude oil. It was estimated that more than 30,000 jobs in Bolivia depended on duty-free exports to the United States.

=== Argentina ===
The Bolivian government announced the formation of a bilateral technical commission to assess the viability of supplying gas to Argentina. The Hydrocarbon Minister, Saul Avalos, said deliberations would begin upon his return from Buenos Aires on December 1 to agree on the terms, including the volume and payment commitments. As it stood at the time Bolivia exported nearly 1.7 million cubic meters of gas a day to Argentina, but was trying to redefine the terms of the contract in force, which established that 7.7 million cubic meters should have been supplied in the year, and with projected supplies of 16.6 million cubic meters in 2009 and 27.7 million cubic meters in 2010. Due to the limited extraction capacity the country was bound to promise only what it could accomplish with Brazilian internal markets priority.

== Relations with Europe ==
In summer 2013, Morales was returning from a summit in Moscow where he made comments that he would consider giving political asylum to U.S. citizen Edward Snowden. On his trip to Europe, his plane was forced to land for 14 hours in Austria after Italy, France, Spain and Portugal denied him access to their airspace on fears that Snowden was aboard the airplane. It turned out that Snowden was not on board. However, the Spanish ambassador to Austria came to the airport with two staff members to search his plane. The following week, at a summit in Cochabamba, five Latin American leaders, Argentina's Cristina Fernández de Kirchner, Uruguay's José Mujica, Ecuador's Rafael Correa, Suriname's Dési Bouterse and Venezuela's Nicolás Maduro, denounced Morales' "virtual kidnapping" and the United States pressure they believed resulted in the action. A statement at the end of the summit demanded answers from France, Portugal, Italy and Spain, but did not mention the U.S. Morales also later said "We don't need a United States embassy in Bolivia. My hand would not shake to close the US embassy. We have dignity, sovereignty. Without the US, we are better politically, democratically." Maduro said "Europe broke all the rules of the game. We're here to tell President Evo Morales that he can count on us. Whoever picks a fight with Bolivia, picks a fight with Venezuela." Correa said that all the leaders present were offering "all of our support" to Morales and called the move an aggression against the Americas. Russia also criticised France, Spain and Portugal said that "the actions of the authorities of France, Spain and Portugal could hardly be considered friendly actions towards Bolivia [...] Russia calls on the international community to comply strictly with international legal principles." Though France apologised in a statement to the Bolivian government with French president François Hollande saying that there was "conflicting information" over the passenger manifest, Morales said "apologies are not enough because the stance is that international treaties must be respected." Bolivia said that it would summon the French and Italian ambassadors and the Portuguese consul to demand explanations. Peru's Ollanta Humala was also at the summit that he had arranged. In the end, Venezuela said that it had offered Snowden asylum. Bolivia also offered him asylum.

== Relations with India ==
India's largest investment project in Latin America was the Jindal Steel and Power iron ore project worth US$2.1 billion and said to be the largest single module of any commercial direct reduction technology project in the world. However, there were hurdles when Bolivian Mines Minister Jose Pimentel said that an addendum may have been required for the Mutun iron ore reserves, amidst Morales' protective provisions in the new constitution to ensure foreign entrepreneurs do not gain an unfair advantage over underdeveloped resources. However, Jindal, later said that the project was back on track.

== Relations with Iran ==
Iran's top diplomat in Bolivia said his country would open two low-cost public health clinics in the country, which is South America's poorest. Iranian business attache Hojjatollah Soltani said his country planned to use Bolivia as a base for future Red Crescent medical programmes across the continent.

On a visit to Iran, Morales also secured Iranian assistance in promotion of hydrocarbon development. Bolivia described the trip as an attempt to reach out to other states "rejected by the international community." Morales added that the two are as "two friendly and revolutionary countries" that are strengthening ties; adding that Iran's efforts to provide economic and political backing would "support the peasant struggle in Latin America." Iran's investments would boost bilateral economic and agricultural ties, from milk processing plants, to television and radio stations, including an agreement to provide Bolivian state television with Spanish-language programming, to funding hydroelectric exploration. Reports also indicated an interest in Bolivia's reserves of uranium and lithium for use in the Iranian nuclear program. Morales previously joked that he too was a part of the "axis of evil."

== Relations with Libya ==
Following Libya's establishment of diplomatic relations on August 13 and Libyan ambassador to Bolivia, Ali Farfar's, announcement of US$80 million in investments, Morales attended the thirty-ninth anniversary of the Libyan Revolution, where he met the Libyan leader Colonel Muammar al-Gaddafi at Benghazi. In Libya he secured support for his government and for democratic change in Bolivia, more active trade, energy cooperation and improved diplomatic relations. The secretary of the Popular Congress, Muftah Queepe, said Libya ratified its support for the revolutionary and democratic process Morales was applying in Bolivia. Queepe praised Gaddafi's philosophy of Islamic socialism. Along with Iran, he also secured Libyan investment in Bolivia's hydrocarbons industry which, despite substantial energy reserves, was struggling to meet a commitment to pump natural gas to Argentina and Brazil.

== Relations with Russia ==
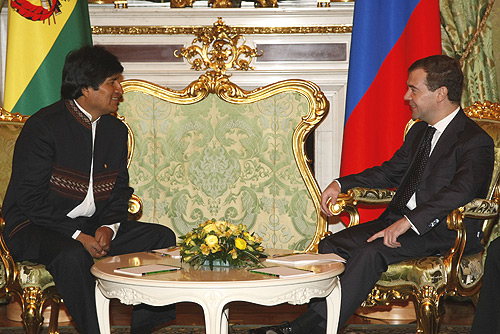
Morales meeting with Russian president Dmitry Medvedev in Moscow on February 16, 2009.

Russia has an embassy in La Paz, and Bolivia has an embassy in Moscow.

Bolivian relations with Russia are mainly economic, as opposed to political and strategic, as an agreement to invest in Bolivia's natural gas fields shows.

In 2008, the Bolivian government had plans to purchase a small batch of helicopters as a first step to re-establish ties with Russia. Ambassador Leonid Golubev told The Associated Press that he would like to see Russia's ties to Bolivia one day "approach the level" of its growing partnership with Venezuela.

In 2009, amid improving relations between the two countries, Bolivia and Russia signed various agreements pertaining to energy and military ties, mining activities and illegal drug eradication.

== Relations with the United States ==
Prior to becoming president a rift with the U.S. was foreshadowed after Morales called President George W. Bush a terrorist: "Bush is the only terrorist, because he is the only one who intervenes militarily in the affairs of other countries. This is state terrorism, but those who demand their rights, those people are not terrorists."

On September 10, 2008, Evo Morales declared the US ambassador to Bolivia, Philip Goldberg, persona non grata—the eighth U.S. ambassador to be declared so, which was quickly followed by the ninth. Goldberg said of the decision that "I regret that the Bolivian government took this decision. I think this has set back U.S.-Bolivian relations." Morales had accused him of conspiring with the opposition after Goldberg was caught on film leaving the office of opposition prefect Rubén Costas following a secret meeting in the early hours of the morning. The U.S. reciprocated by expelling the Bolivian ambassador in Washington. Tensions grew further when Bolivia refused permission for planes from the U.S. Drug Enforcement Administration to fly over Bolivian territory. Morales said: "It's important that the international community knows that here, we don't need control of the United States on coca cultivation... We can control ourselves internally. We don't need any spying from anybody."

Morales said his country should not fear U.S. suspension of trade preferences with Bolivia. In Vallegrande, near where Che Guevara died, he said: "We don't have to be afraid of an economic blockade by the United States against the Bolivian people." Still, his government announced it would send a delegation to Washington to lobby for the country's continued participation in the ATPDEA, a regional trade pact with Andean states offering lowered import tariffs for cooperating with U.S. anti-narcotics efforts.

Relations took a further bite when Morales ordered DEA agents to leave the country within three months from November 1, 2008. In expelling the U.S. agents, he accused them of supporting the opposition separatists, conspiring to overthrow him, spying and having killed farmers. Morales said his country can fight cocaine trafficking on its own. Morales told police officers in the administrative capital of La Paz that, "Some politicians say that with the withdrawal of the DEA, drug trafficking will increase ... I trust that our national police is prepared to fight drug traffickers. We're capable of funding the operations of the national police against drug trafficking." This followed moves earlier in the year where the presidents anti-drug czar Felipe Caceres said Bolivia should "nationalize" the fight against the drug trade, and that the government was ready to invest about $16 million to achieve this.

A 2008 annual report to the U.S. Congress cited three states, including Bolivia, for failing to fight illegal drugs, the first time Bolivia made it onto the most severe category on the list with other political opponents like Venezuela and Myanmar. Morales upped the ante and condemned the United States in saying that it has no such authority to certify whether other countries are successfully fighting drug trafficking. He added that the counter-narcotics "certification process of the U.S. government has to end. It's just political vengeance. It would have to be the OAS or the United Nations that would lead an effort like that."

=== Rapprochement ===
In November 2008, Morales said that he wanted to improve ties with the incoming U.S. administration of Barack Obama. After addressing the U.N. General Assembly, he told the press that "My interest is how to improve relations with the new president. I think we could have a lot of things in common. If we talk about change I have some experience now. I think it would be good to share experiences with the new president-elect." However, ominous signs were also apparent when he repeated allegations against the DEA, saying "The DEA will not return while I am still president. The DEA ... had an intelligence structure, but it wasn't so much to fight drugs, it had more to do with the political aggression against my government...In recent times, we've seen some officials of the DEA involved in political conspiracy." He added that his government would set up a new intelligence operation involving the military and police to fight drug trafficking in place of the DEA. Later Morales met with four U.S. lawmakers to discuss the expulsion of the U.S. ambassador. After the meeting Richard Lugar (R-In) said that the United States rejected any suggestion that it did not respect Bolivia's sovereignty or the legitimacy of its government. Morales responded that he was confident relations with the United States would improve when Obama becomes president.

== Vietnam and China ==
Due to the declining U.S. economy after the 2008 financial crisis, Bolivian trade officials looked for alternative markets to close an export gap with trade reduction between the U.S. and Bolivia. The country chose Vietnam and China in this regard. Deputy Foreign Minister Pablo Guzman said he would be looking into the possibility of signing bilateral trade agreements with the two countries. The move was said to not only cover the gap, but also expand exports in general.

== Criticism and controversy ==
=== Dispute with the Europe Union (EU) over immigration ===
A new European Union (EU) immigration law detaining illegal immigrants for up to 18 months before deportation triggered outrage across Latin America, with Venezuelan president Hugo Chavez threatening to cut off oil exports to Europe.

Evo Morales wrote an open letter to the EU criticizing the new restrictions, published in the British Guardian newspaper as an opinion-editorial on June 16, 2008. On June 18, Morales said that the European law was "racist."

On EU immigration law, Morales said:

"We, too, could say that we are going to expel those who have looted and stolen from us, those who imposed policies of hunger and misery, those who exported illness, exploitation, discrimination."

=== 2008 G20 summit ===
Together with Former Cuban President Fidel Castro, Morales said the summit of Group of 20 states was dominated by U.S. President George W. Bush and didn't focus on the problems that plague poorer countries. While Castro said a statement published at the end of the summit didn't address any of the "abuses" caused by the U.S. economic system, Morales said developed countries have provided more money to help distressed banks than they have committed to poor countries to improve health, education and development. "The so-called consensus of the G-20 continues to emphasize market principles and free trade. To get out of this crisis we have to break with the neo-liberal economic model and the capitalist system."
