= Bolivia–Iran relations =

- Iran: Bolivia

Bolivia and Iran maintain foreign relations. Iran has an embassy in La Paz, and Bolivia has an embassy in Tehran. Both countries are members of the Non-Aligned Movement and Group of 77.

== History ==
The two countries formed full diplomatic relations in 2007 under MAS.

== Economic relations ==
Iran's ambassador to Bolivia said his country would open two low-cost public health clinics in the country, which is South America's poorest. Iranian business attache Hojjatollah Soltani said his country planned to use Bolivia as a base for future Red Crescent medical programmes across the continent.

== Political relations ==
During another visit to Iran in 2010, together with then Iranian President Mahmoud Ahmadinejad, then Bolivian president Evo Morales said there was a need to "strengthen the resistance front formed by independent and freedom-seeking nations to fight against imperialism and global hegemony." Bolivia also denied it had any joint uranium exploration deals with Iran in the face of international pressure on Iran's nuclear programme.

Following the bombing of Iran's nuclear facilities by the United States in June 2025, then President of Bolivia Luis Arce condemned the U.S. action, emphasizing, "The bombing of nuclear facilities not only threatens peace in the Middle East but also violates the fundamental principles of international law and the UN Charter."

However, Bolivian new right-wing president, Rodrigo Paz, who assumed office in November 2025, has moved Bolivia politically closer to the USA, meaning worsened relations between Bolivia and Iran.

== Bilateral visits ==
On a visit to Iran in 2008, Bolivian President Morales secured Iranian assistance in promotion of hydrocarbon development. An Iranian commission would help Bolivia to study different options of promoting petro-chemistry and agribusiness production, as well as seek to quicken an investment of about $1.1 billion that Iranian President Ahmadnenijad promised on his visit to Bolivia in September, 2007. Bolivia described the trip as an attempt to reach out to other states "rejected by the international community." Morales added that the two are as "two friendly and revolutionary countries" that are strengthening ties; adding that Iran's efforts to provide economic and political backing would "support the peasant struggle in Latin America." Iran's investments would boost bilateral economic and agricultural ties, from milk processing plants, to television and radio stations, including an agreement to provide Bolivian state television with Spanish-language programming, to funding hydroelectric exploration. Reports also indicated an interest in Bolivia's reserves of uranium and lithium for use in Iranian nuclear projects. Morales previously joked that he too is a part of the "axis of evil."

Iranian Defense Minister General Ahmad Vahidi visited Bolivia at the behest of his Bolivian counterpart Maria Cecilia Chacon. After attending a military ceremony he said that "Latin America is no longer the US' backyard and Iran will enhance its constructive relations with the regional countries." He also called the visit "successful" and that the two states would enhance their "growing ties."

== Resident diplomatic missions ==
- Bolivia has an embassy in Tehran.
- Iran has an embassy in La Paz.

== See also ==
- Foreign relations of Bolivia
- Foreign relations of Iran
- Cement industry in Bolivia
