= La Prensa (La Paz) =

Bolivian daily newspaper

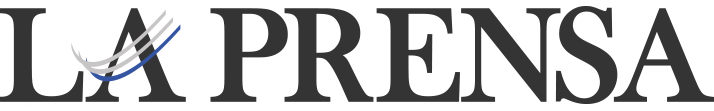

- La Prensa print edition on 12 May 2024
- Type: Daily newspaper
- Format: Tabloid
- Owner: Editorial Canelas
- Founder: Jorge Canelas Sáenz
- Founded: 9 March 1998
- Ceased publication: 15 January 2016
- Relaunched: 12 May 2024
- Language: Spanish
- City: La Paz
- Price: Bs 6.50
- Sister newspapers: Los Tiempos; El Alteño
- Website: laprensa.bo

La Prensa (lit. 'The Press') is a daily newspaper published in La Paz, Bolivia. It was founded by Jorge Canelas on 9 March 1998 as a joint initiative between Los Tiempos of Cochabamba and El Deber of Santa Cruz, and entered circulation on 14 June. In 2008, the newspaper published a story alleging corruption on the part of the government, resulting in the restriction of state advertising. Financial issues forced it to cease publication on 15 January 2016 after 6,400 issues. It was relaunched on 12 May 2024 after eight years out of print.
