= Bolivia–Russia relations =

- Bolivia: Russia

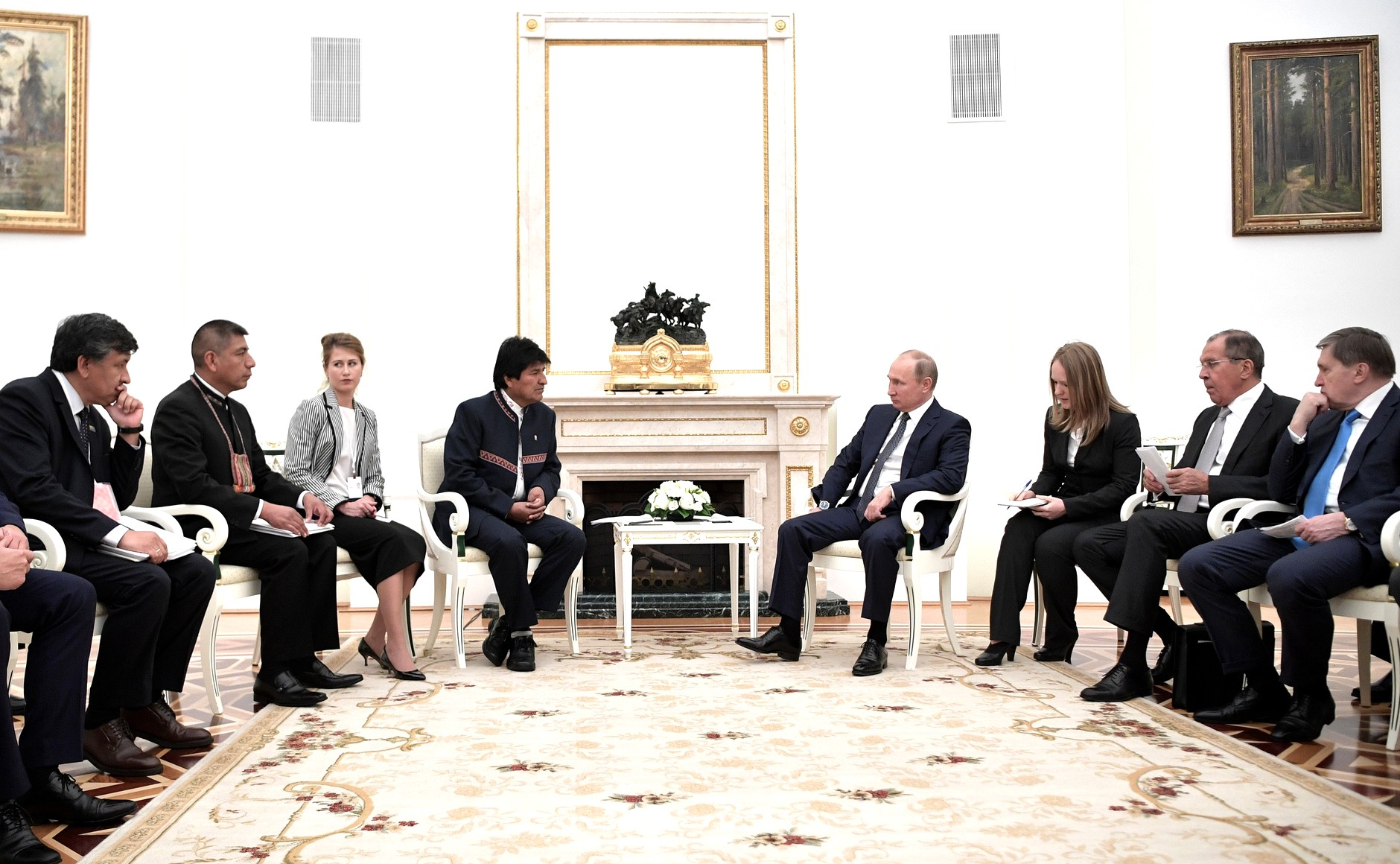
President Morales meeting with Russian president Vladimir Putin in Moscow Kremlin in June 2018.

Bolivia–Russia relations (Russian: Российско-боливийские отношения) are the relations between the two countries, Bolivia and Russia. Russia has an embassy in La Paz, and Bolivia has an embassy in Moscow.

== Background ==
The Soviet Union established diplomatic relations with Bolivia on April 18, 1945.

== Current ==
With Bolivia the focus on relations with Russia is mainly economic, as opposed to political and strategic, as an agreement to invest in Bolivia's natural gas fields shows. It is seen to "help Latin America...[as it] expands Latin America's economic opportunities, diversifies its relationships...that's healthy."

In September 2008 Gazprom, the Russian energy company of which the state holds a controlling stake, signed an agreement worth US$4.5 billion to explore for gas in Bolivia. In December 2008, Russia invested US$4 million in a study on the Bolivian gas industry, with hopes of opening a joint Russian-Bolivian center on gas exploration sometime in 2009.

In March 2009, Russia and Bolivia signed a protocol agreement aimed at strengthening democracy in each nation. In February 2009 President Evo Morales visited Moscow. His trip was the first ever by a Bolivian head of state to the Russian capital. During the visit, both leaders signed an agreement strengthening energy and military ties between the two nations in addition to strengthening counter narcotics co-operation. In May 2009, Bolivia's Viceminister of Foreign Affairs said that Bolivia would be making a multimilliondollar arms and transportation purchase from Russia in efforts to combat drug smuggling and production in Bolivia.

In October 2009, President Evo Morales announce the plans to construct a technical support and repair facility for Russian aircraft in Bolivia that would be built at a former U.S. base near the town of Chimore in the center of the country.

In March 2022, Bolivia abstained from condemning the Russian invasion of Ukraine.
