= Bolivia–India relations =

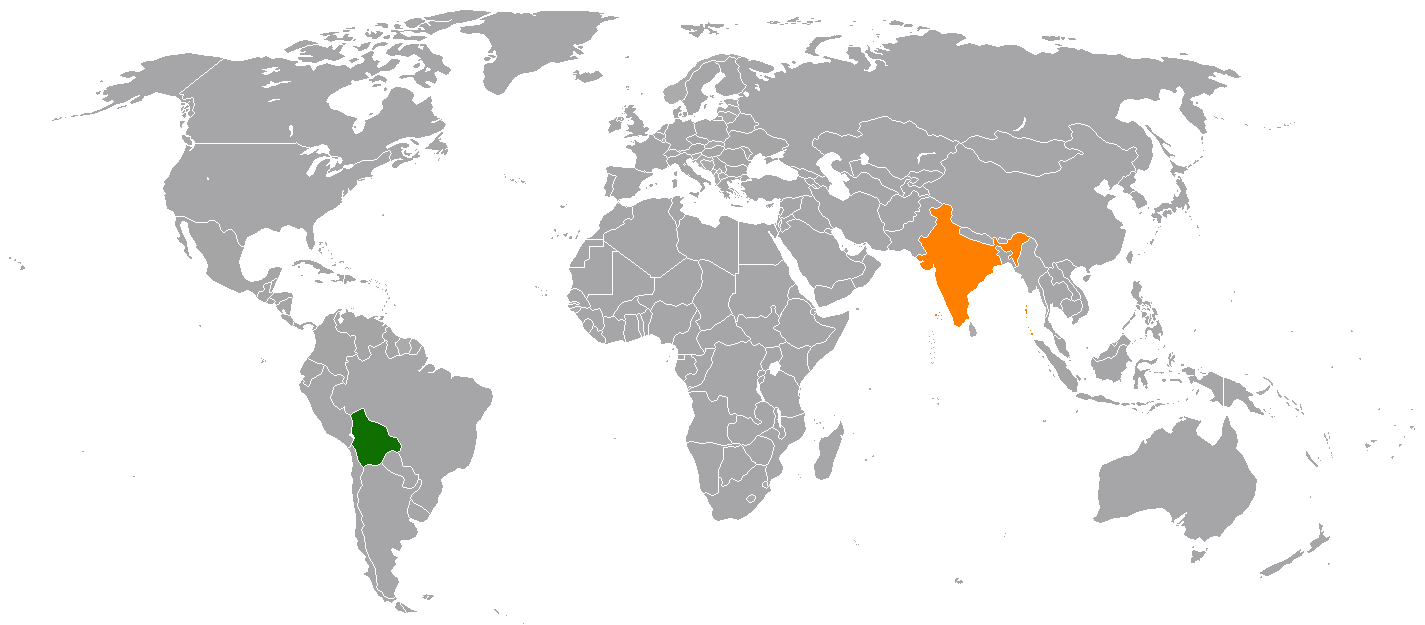
- Bolivia: India

Bolivia–India relations are the diplomatic and bilateral relations that exist between the Plurinational State of Bolivia and the Republic of India. Both countries are members of the World Trade Organization and the United Nations.

== History ==
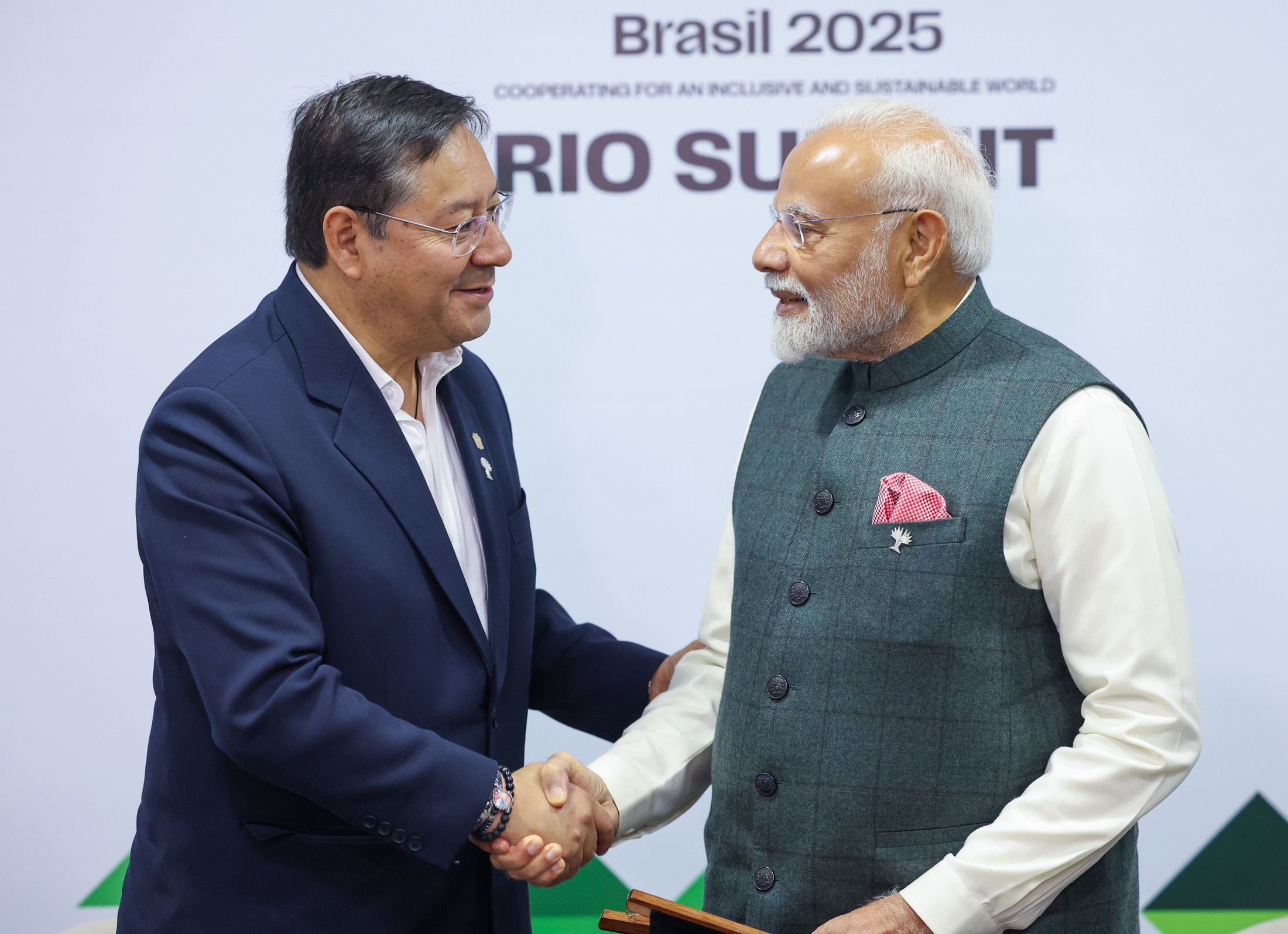
Prime Minister of India, Shri Narendra Damodardas Modi with the President of Bolivia, Mr. Luis Arce Catacora

The Embassy of India in Lima, Peru has been jointly accredited to Bolivia since April 1981. India also maintains honorary consuls general in La Paz and Santa Cruz, although the latter is not currently functioning. Bolivia opened its embassy in New Delhi in 2012, and Jorge Cardenas Robles assumed office as the first resident Ambassador of Bolivia to India on 8 November 2012.

The first India-Bolivia Foreign Office Consultations were held in La Paz on 20 November 2014. Several ministerial level visits between the two countries have taken place.

President Ram Nath Kovind was on a visit to Bolivia from March 28 to 30, 2019. This was the first visit by an Indian president to Bolivia.

== Trade ==
Bilateral trade between Bolivia and India totaled US$314.684 million in 2015–16. India exported $74.432 million worth of goods to Bolivia, and imported $240.252 million in 2015–16. The main commodities exported by India to Bolivia are automobiles, iron and steel, pharmaceuticals, machinery, rubber and plastic products and yarns and textiles. The major commodities imported by India from Bolivia are gold, leather and animal feed.

The two countries are negotiating a BIPPA (Bilateral Investment Promotion and Protection Agreement).

Indian firm Jindal Steel & Power Ltd. was awarded a contract to develop the El Mutun iron ore mine in 2007. The company announced that it would invest $2.3 billion to establish a steel plant, in what was the largest foreign direct investment in Bolivian history. However, the company shut down the project in July 2012, accusing the Bolivian government of not fulfilling "contract conditions". In August 2014, the International Chamber of Commerce ruled in favour of Jindal and ordered the state-owned mining company Empresa Siderúrgica del Mutún to pay Jindal $22.5 million in compensation.

Indian pesticides company UPL has an office in Santa Cruz, Bolivia. Indian car manufacturer Tata Motors retails its vehicles through an authorized dealer in Bolivia.

== Defence ==
In May 2009, the Indian Ministry of External Affairs turned down a request from Bolivia for a line of credit to purchase seven HAL Dhruvs for the Bolivian Air Force. Bolivian Defence Minister Reymi Ferreira and COFEDENA General Manager Col. Felipe Eduardo Vasquez Moya visited Goa in March 2016 to participate DEFEXPO 2016.

== Cultural relations ==
Bolivia and India signed an agreement on cultural co-operation in 1997.

Bollywood films, music, and dance are popular in Bolivia. Bollywood dance academies (locally known as Danca-Indu) and Indian dance groups are present in the cities of La Paz, Cochabamba, Potosí and Oruro.

According to a report by hotel bookings website Hotels.com, Bolivian tourists spent the most money in India in the first six months of 2016, spending an average of ₹12,128 (US$130) during the period, 28% higher than they spent in the first 6 months of 2015.

== Foreign aid ==
India provided financial support to install solar lighting at the Archaeological Complex of Tiwanaku. India donated $200,000 worth of medicines in the aftermath of landslides in Bolivia in 2007, and $100,000 cash in response to floods caused by La Niña in 2008. India provided Bolivia with $200,000 cash to deal with floods in the North and Central regions of the country in 2011.

In September 2016, India donated $3.3 million to establish a center of excellence in technology in Bolivia. At the ceremony to sign the agreement, Bolivian President Evo Morales announced that the country would seek India's help to build its first ever pharmaceutical plant in the city of Cochabamba.

Citizens of Bolivia are eligible for scholarships under the Indian Technical and Economic Cooperation Programme and the Indian Council for Cultural Relations.

In March 2019, 8 MoUs were signed between India and Bolivia. These MoUs were signed in the fields of culture, mining, visa waiver arrangement for diplomats, the exchange between diplomatic academics, space, traditional medicine, establishment of center of excellence in IT and Bi-Oceanic Railway projects.

== Indians in Bolivia ==
As of December 2016, there are around 100 Indians in Bolivia. They are primarily involved in retail, transportation, agriculture, and religious communities.

In March 2019, President of Bolivia Evo Morales Ayma honored Ram Nath Kovind with the highest State Honour of Bolivia 'Condor de Los Andres en el grado de Gran Collar' in Santa Cruz.

In March 2019, A Plaque of Mahatama Gandhi Hall was inaugurated by the President of India, Shri Ram Nath Kovind at the Gabriel Rene Moreno University in Santa Cruz.
