= Bolivia–China relations =

- Bolivia: China

The Plurinational State of Bolivia and the People's Republic of China officially established bilateral relations on July 9, 1985.

== History ==
Since the establishment of diplomatic ties between China and Bolivia in 1985, relations have expanded from economic and cultural ties to military, transport, infrastructure, raw materials, education and other areas.

The two countries celebrated 25th anniversary of diplomatic ties in Beijing, July 9, 2010.

In August 2010, China and Bolivia agreed to continue to develop military ties and cooperation. Relations between the two countries have deteriorated since their peak under the governments of Evo Morales and Luis Arce.

== Bilateral relations ==
Bilateral trade between Bolivia and China began at approximately $4 million, and has increased to over $27.76 million in 2002.

China's exports to Bolivia includes hardware, machinery, light industrial goods, textiles and daily necessities.

Bolivian exports to China were lumber and mineral ore.

China provided support for the establishment of the Bolivian Space Agency and the launch of its first satellite in 2014 for a total cost of US$300 million. China and also provides loans, e.g. of 67 million dollars to upgrade infrastructure in the Oruro region.

A Chinese firm is a partner in a lithium mining operation in Bolivia valued at $2.3 billion.

Bolivia joined the Belt and Road Initiative (BRI) in 2018.

In July 2019, UN ambassadors of 37 countries, including Bolivia, signed a joint letter to the United Nations Human Rights Council defending China's persecution of Uyghurs in Xinjiang. Bolivia was one of 16 countries that defended China's policies in Xinjiang in 2019 but did not do so in 2020.

In June 2023, Bolivia turned to China for assistance amid the former's first economic crisis since the early 2000s.

In February 2024, Bolivia obtained a $350 million loan from China to build a zinc refining factory.

== Surveillance systems ==
In 2019, China developed the purpose of overhauling the Bolivian security system worth more than 105 million dollars. This system comprises new surveillance cameras, drones, automated evidence processing systems, and increased manpower to manage each of these new technologies, which have been collectively dubbed the BOL 110. The Bolivian Government said BOL 110 implementing artificial intelligence to counter crime. Some individuals have expressed concern about the nature and the pervasiveness of these technologies, however, and how they may be used to create a Bolivian police state. The recent employment of dubious surveillance and manipulation tactics by the Bolivian government may validate these concerns, with some scholars going so far as to warn that similar systems can encourage authoritarian practices.

== Resident diplomatic missions ==
of Bolivia in China

- Beijing (Embassy)

of China in Bolivia

- La Paz (Embassy)
- Santa Cruz de la Sierra (Consulate-General)

== See also ==
- Foreign relations of Bolivia
- Foreign relations of China

== Bibliography ==
- Cardenal, Juan Pablo; Araújo, Heriberto (2011). La silenciosa conquista china (in Spanish). Barcelona: Crítica. p. 279. ISBN 9788498922578.
