= Bolivia–Cuba relations =

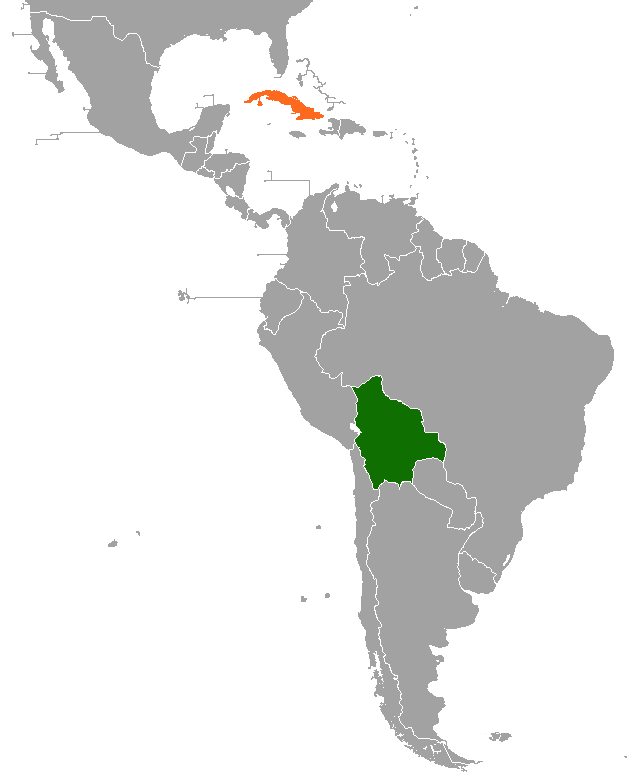

- Bolivia: Cuba

Bolivia–Cuba relations refers to the diplomatic relations between Bolivia and Cuba. Both nations are members of the United Nations, but relations of Bolivia with Cuba, like those of most countries in the Western Hemisphere with the notable exceptions of Canada and Mexico, have waxed and waned over the decades depending on geopolitical and regional political circumstances. Relations were good under Evo Morales, who shared the position of his like-minded left-wing allies in Nicaragua and Venezuela that Fidel Castro was a humanist and beloved icon of resistance to US hegemony in the Americas.

== Rapprochement ==
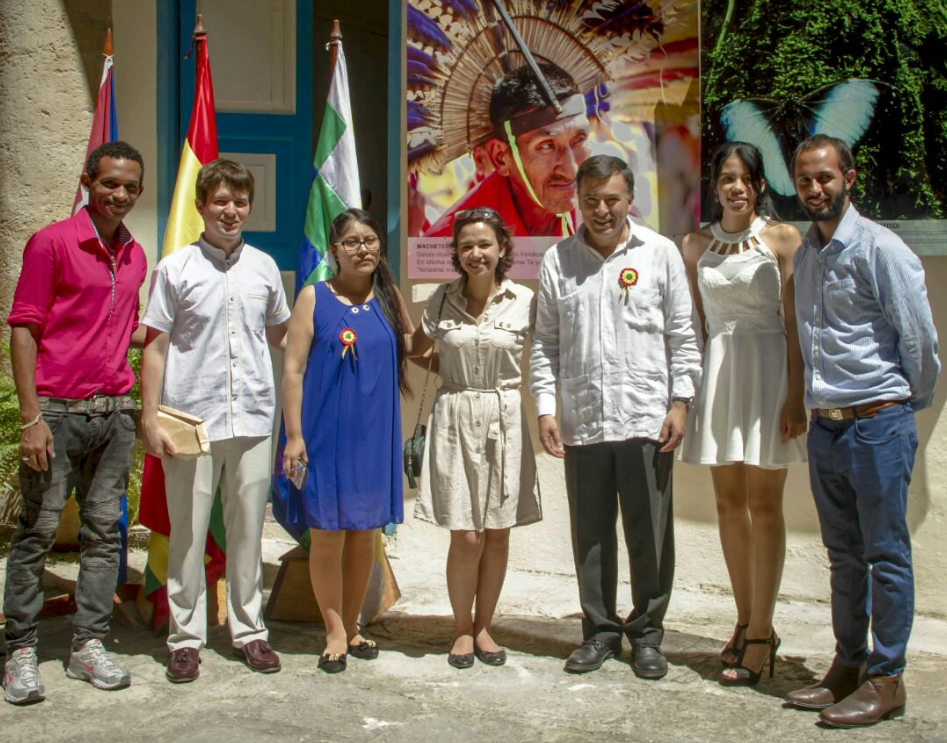
From left to right, the three to the center: former consul Jessica Suarez Mamani, former secretary Natalia Rodriguez Blanco and former ambassador Juan Ramón Quintana.

Relations were established on January 11, 1983 under Bolivian President Hernán Siles Zuazo and Cuban President Fidel Castro after twenty years of no relations. In 2013, relations were characterized as "excellent" by Cuban ambassador to Bolivia La Paz Rolando Gomez.

== Relations under Evo Morales ==
Following Evo Morales' rise to power in Bolivia in January 2006, Bolivia and Cuba became staunch allies and Bolivia joined the Cuba- and Venezuela-founded trade bloc ALBA. Bolivia became a long time recipient of aid from Cuba, especially Cuban medical internationalism.

== Post-Evo Morales ==
Following the ouster of Evo Morales in November 2019, relations between Bolivia and Cuba deteriorated as Bolivia's new interim president Jeanine Áñez sent 725 people (700 of them doctors) back to Cuba, accusing them of protesting against the new government. The government of Jeanine Añez directly accused Cuban actions to the relationship established by and through former minister and former ambassador Juan Ramón Quintana and also former minister Hugo Moldiz, who would have been the link for Cuban action on Bolivian soil through the former Bolivian consul in Cuba, Jessica Suarez Mamani and the secretary of Quintana, Natalia Rodriguez Blanco.

On 15 November 2019, Foreign Minister Karen Longaric expelled 725 Cuban citizens, mostly medical doctors, after she raised concerns about their alleged involvement in protests.

In January 2020, the interim government suspended relations with Cuba in response to remarks made by Bruno Rodríguez Parrilla, who called Áñez a "liar," "coupist" and "self-proclaimed" in reference to her latest statements about the role of Cuban medical doctors in the country.

In October 2020, Luis Arce, who was finance minister in Morales's government, was elected President of Bolivia. After his victory, Arce announced the restoration of ties with Cuba.
