= Cement industry in Bolivia =

The Cement Industry in Bolivia refers to the production, sale and consumption of cement in the country since according to the latest official data from the National Institute of Statistics of Bolivia, the country had a production of around 3.8 million metric tons of cement during the year 2022. In Bolivia there are five large Bolivian companies that produce cement, which are: SOBOCE, FANCESA, COBOCE, ITACAMBA, and ECEBOL.

== History ==
The first cement factory in Bolivia was the Bolivian Cement Society S.A. (SOBOCE) located in the Department of La Paz which was founded on September 24, 1925, and after three years began producing cement in 1928, being the oldest in the country.

On January 21, 1959, the National Cement Factory (FANCESA) was founded in the city of Sucre, which would also enter the Bolivian market. In 1966, the Bolivian Cement Cooperative (COBOCE) was created with headquarters in the city of Cochabamba that would begin to produce cement from the year 1972.

In 1997 another private Bolivian company called "Itacamba Cementos" was born, which would begin to produce cement from that same year. Some time later, the Bolivian government would also intervene in the production of cement in the country, managing to create the Bolivian Cement Productive Public Company (ECEBOL) with its two cement plants, the first located in the municipality of Caracollo in the Department of Oruro and the second plant located in the city of Potosí in the Department of Potosi.

=== Production ===
During the last 32 years, Bolivian cement production has increased considerably reaching a growth of more than 660%, from producing only 500,000 tons in 1990 to 3,888,000 tons in 2022.

View source data.

Latin American and Caribbean countries according to its annual cement production			Latin American and Caribbean countries according to its annual cement production per capita		
N.	Country	Cement Production in metric tons (2021)	N.	Country	Cement Production per capita (2021)
1st	Brazil	60,772,000 tons	1st	Barbados	768 kilograms
2nd	Mexico	51,745,000 tons	2nd	Dominican Republic	590 kilograms
3rd	Colombia	13,797,000 tons	3rd	Trinidad and Tobago	473 kilograms
4th	Peru	12,855,000 tons	4th	Mexico	408 kilograms
5th	Argentina	12,117,000 tons	5th	Peru	381 kilograms
6th	Dominican Republic	6,562,000 tons	6th	Jamaica	346 kilograms
7th	Ecuador	5,422,000 tons	7th	Ecuador	304 kilograms
8th	Chile	4,750,000 tons	8th	Bolivia	300 kilograms
9th	Guatemala	4,137,000 tons	9th	Brazil	283 kilograms
10th	Bolivia	3,607,000 tons	10th	Colombia	270 kilograms
11th	Venezuela	2,560,000 tons	11th	Argentina	264 kilograms
12th	Honduras	1,650,000 tons	12th	Uruguay	260 kilograms
13th	El Salvador	1,520,000 tons	13th	Chile	243 kilograms
14th	Cuba	1,320,000 tons	14th	Guatemala	241 kilograms
15th	Paraguay	1,100,000 tons	15th	El Salvador	240 kilograms
16th	Jamaica	979,000 tons	16th	Costa Rica	188 kilograms
17th	Costa Rica	975,000 tons	17th	Panama	188 kilograms
18th	Uruguay	893,000 tons	18th	Honduras	163 kilograms
19th	Haiti	840,000 tons	19th	Paraguay	149 kilograms
20th	Panama	821,000 tons	20th	Cuba	117 kilograms
21st	Trinidad and Tobago	723,000 tons	21st	Puerto Rico	98 kilograms
22nd	Nicaragua	512,000 tons	22nd	Venezuela	90 kilograms
23rd	Puerto Rico	320,000 tons	23rd	Suriname	81 kilograms
24th	Barbados	216,000 tons	24th	Nicaragua	74 kilograms
25th	Suriname	50,000 tons	25th	Haiti	73 kilograms
Source: Inter-American Cement Federation
