= Bolivian passport =

Travel document

Bolivian passport; Pasaporte boliviano
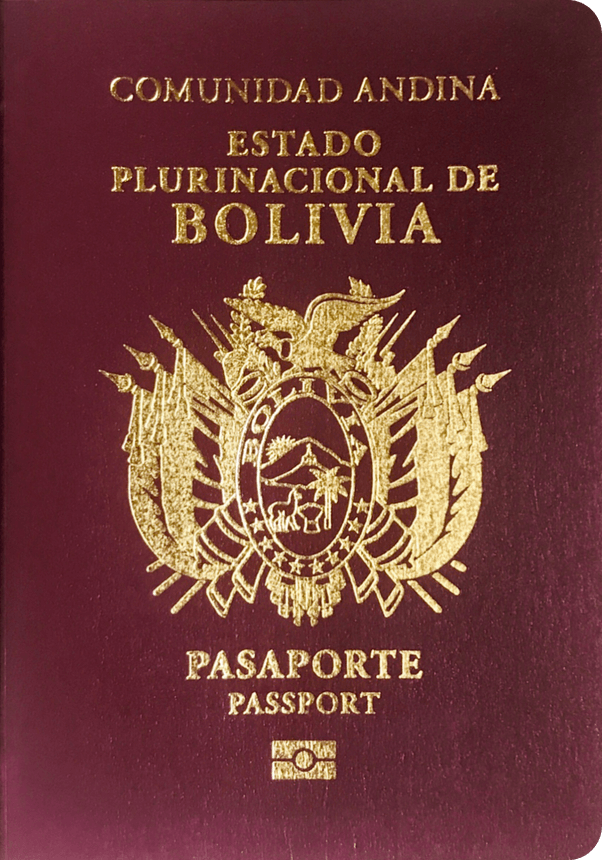
- Type: Passport
- Issued by: Bolivia
- First issued: February 2019 (biometric passport)
- Purpose: Identification
- Eligibility: Bolivian citizenship

Bolivian passport (Spanish: Pasaporte boliviano) is the official travel document issued to citizens of Bolivia by the Bolivian Government through its specially appointed office, Dirección General de Migración (General Office of Migration). The document can also be extended abroad via consulate representatives.

The current passport has undergone several modifications following international regulations as well as other regarding naming and adherence to international organisations, like the Andean Community of Nations. In an official press release the General Office on Migration details 18 safety measures including the costs and other details of the new passport which now complies with international regulations for mechanical and biometric readings.

== See also ==
- Andean passport
- Visa policy of Bolivia
- Visa requirements for Bolivian citizens
