= List of diplomatic missions of Bolivia =

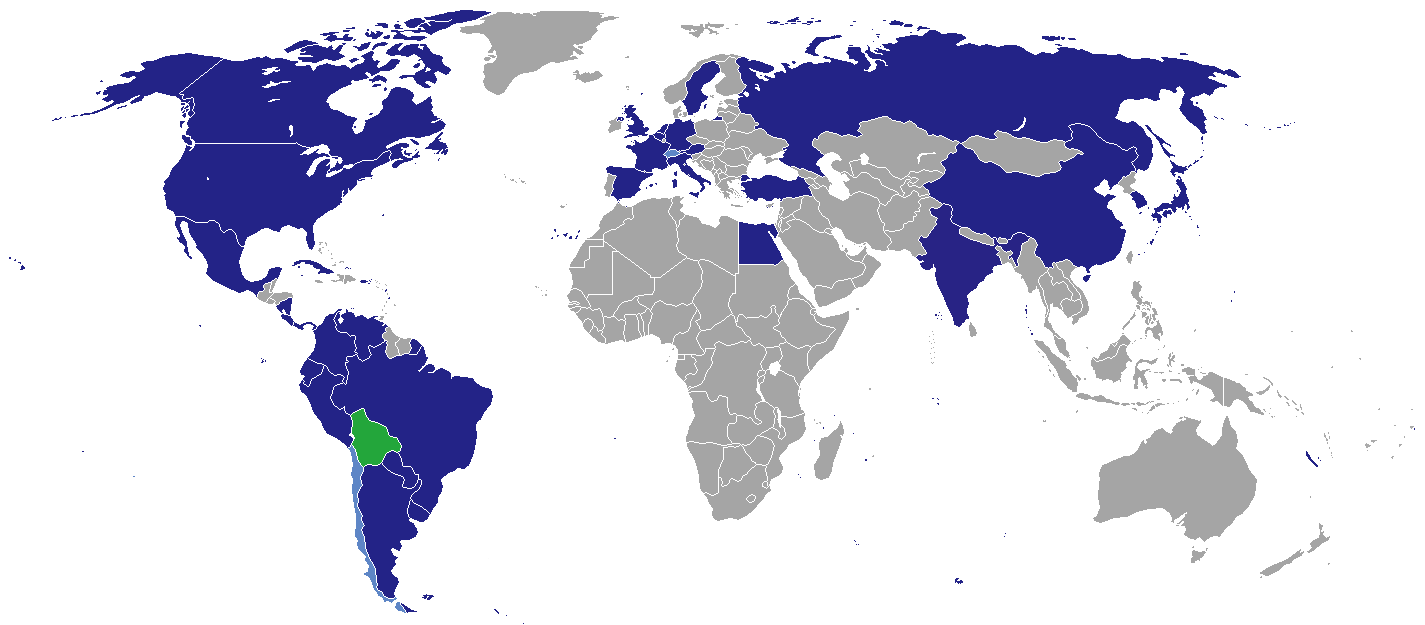
Diplomatic missions of Bolivia

This is a list of diplomatic missions of Bolivia, excluding honorary consulates.

Due to strained relations with Chile, Bolivia only has Consulates-General in Chile.

== Current missions ==
=== Africa ===
Host country	Host city	Mission	Concurrent accreditation	Ref.
Egypt	Cairo	Embassy		

=== Americas ===
Host country	Host city	Mission	Concurrent accreditation	Ref.
Argentina	Buenos Aires	Embassy		
Argentina	Buenos Aires	Consulate-General		
Argentina	Córdoba	Consulate		
Argentina	Jujuy	Consulate		
Argentina	La Quiaca	Consulate		
Argentina	Mendoza	Consulate		
Argentina	Orán	Consulate		
Argentina	Pocitos	Consulate		
Argentina	Rosario	Consulate		
Argentina	Salta	Consulate		
Argentina	Viedma	Consulate		
Brazil	Brasília	Embassy		
Brazil	Rio de Janeiro	Consulate-General		
Brazil	São Paulo	Consulate-General		
Brazil	Cáceres	Consulate		
Brazil	Corumbá	Consulate		
Brazil	Epitaciolândia	Consulate		
Brazil	Guajará-Mirim	Consulate		
Canada	Ottawa	Embassy		
Chile	Santiago de Chile	Consulate-General		
Chile	Arica	Consulate-General		
Chile	Antofagasta	Consulate		
Chile	Calama	Consulate		
Chile	Iquique	Consulate		
Colombia	Bogotá	Embassy		
Costa Rica	San José	Embassy	Countries: El Salvador	
Cuba	Havana	Embassy	Countries: Dominican Republic	
Ecuador	Quito	Embassy		
Mexico	Mexico City	Embassy	Countries: Guatemala; Honduras	
Nicaragua	Managua	Embassy		
Panama	Panama City	Embassy		
Paraguay	Asunción	Embassy		
Peru	Lima	Embassy		
Peru	Cusco	Consulate		
Peru	Ilo	Consulate		
Peru	Puno	Consulate		
Peru	Tacna	Consulate		
United States	Washington, D.C.	Embassy		
United States	Washington, D.C.	Consulate-General		
United States	Houston	Consulate-General		
United States	Los Angeles	Consulate-General		
United States	Miami	Consulate-General		
United States	New York City	Consulate-General		
Uruguay	Montevideo	Embassy	International Organizations: Latin American Integration Association; Mercosur	
Venezuela	Caracas	Embassy		

=== Asia ===
Host country	Host city	Mission	Concurrent accreditation	Ref.
China	Beijing	Embassy	Countries: Thailand; Vietnam	
India	New Delhi	Embassy		
Japan	Tokyo	Embassy	Countries: Malaysia	
South Korea	Seoul	Embassy		
Turkey	Ankara	Embassy		

=== Europe ===
Host country	Host city	Mission	Concurrent accreditation	Ref.
Austria	Vienna	Embassy	Countries: Croatia; Hungary; Slovakia	
Belgium	Brussels	Embassy	Countries: Luxembourg; International Organizations: European Union	
France	Paris	Embassy		
Germany	Berlin	Embassy	Countries: Poland; Switzerland	
Holy See (Note: The Bolivian Embassy to the Holy See is located outside Vatican territory in Rome.)	Rome	Embassy		
Italy	Rome	Embassy	Countries: Cyprus; Greece; International Organizations: Food and Agriculture Organization	
Italy	Milan	Consulate-General	Countries: Cyprus; Greece; International Organizations: Food and Agriculture Organization	
Netherlands	The Hague	Embassy		
Russia	Moscow	Embassy		
Spain	Madrid	Embassy	Countries: Andorra	
Spain	Madrid	Consulate-General	Countries: Andorra	
Spain	Barcelona	Consulate-General	Countries: Andorra	
Spain	Bilbao	Consulate	Countries: Andorra	
Spain	Murcia	Consulate	Countries: Andorra	
Spain	Seville	Consulate	Countries: Andorra	
Spain	Valencia	Consulate	Countries: Andorra	
Spain	Granada	Vice-Consulate	Countries: Andorra	
Spain	Palma de Mallorca	Vice-Consulate	Countries: Andorra	
Sweden	Stockholm	Embassy	Countries: Denmark; Finland; Norway	
Switzerland	Geneva	Consulate-General		
United Kingdom	London	Embassy		

=== Multilateral organizations ===
Organization	Host city	Host country	Mission	Ref.
Organization of American States	Washington, D.C.	United States	Permanent Mission	
United Nations	New York City	United States	Permanent Mission	
United Nations	Geneva	Switzerland	Permanent Mission	
UNESCO	Paris	France	Permanent Delegation	

== Gallery ==
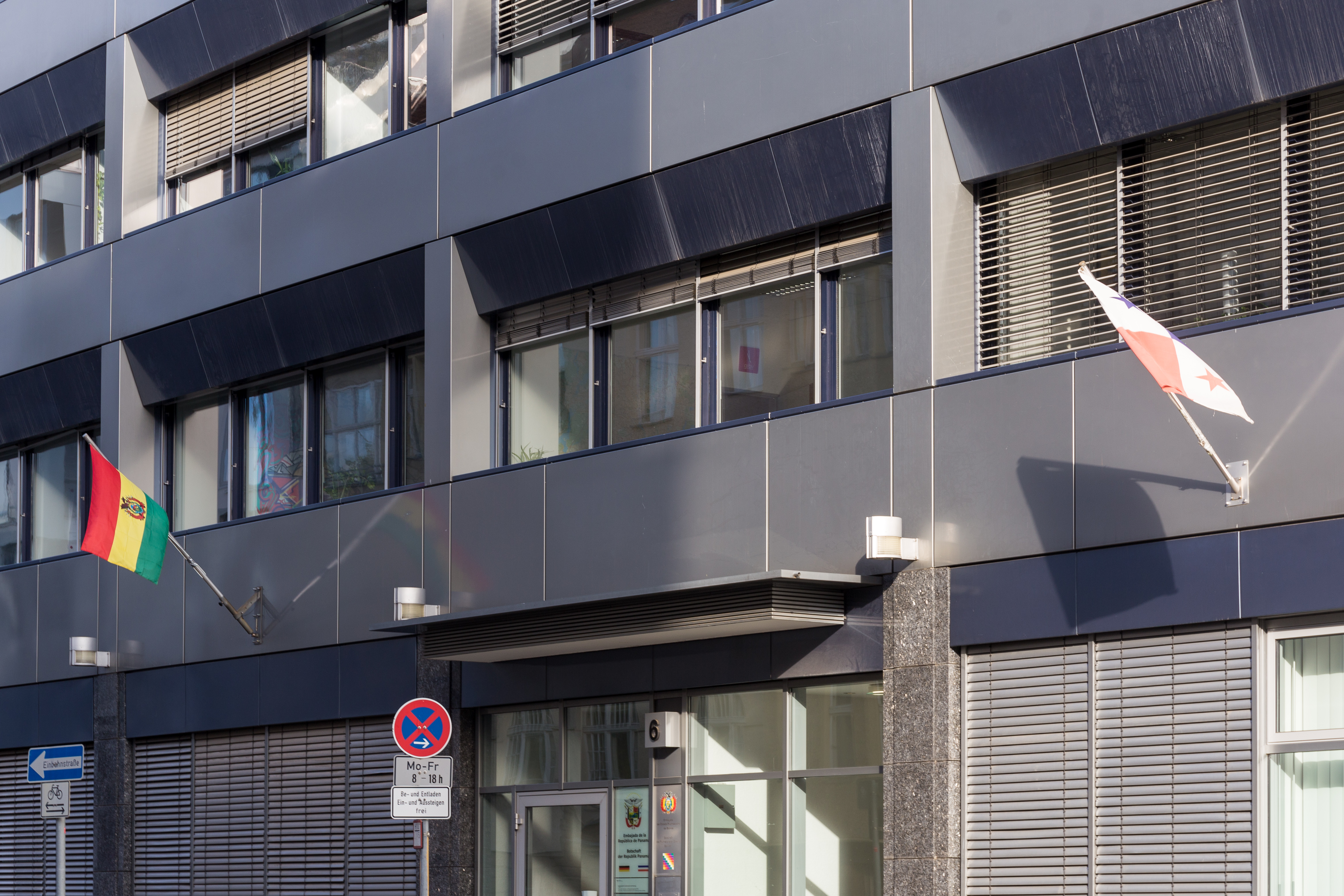
Embassy in Berlin

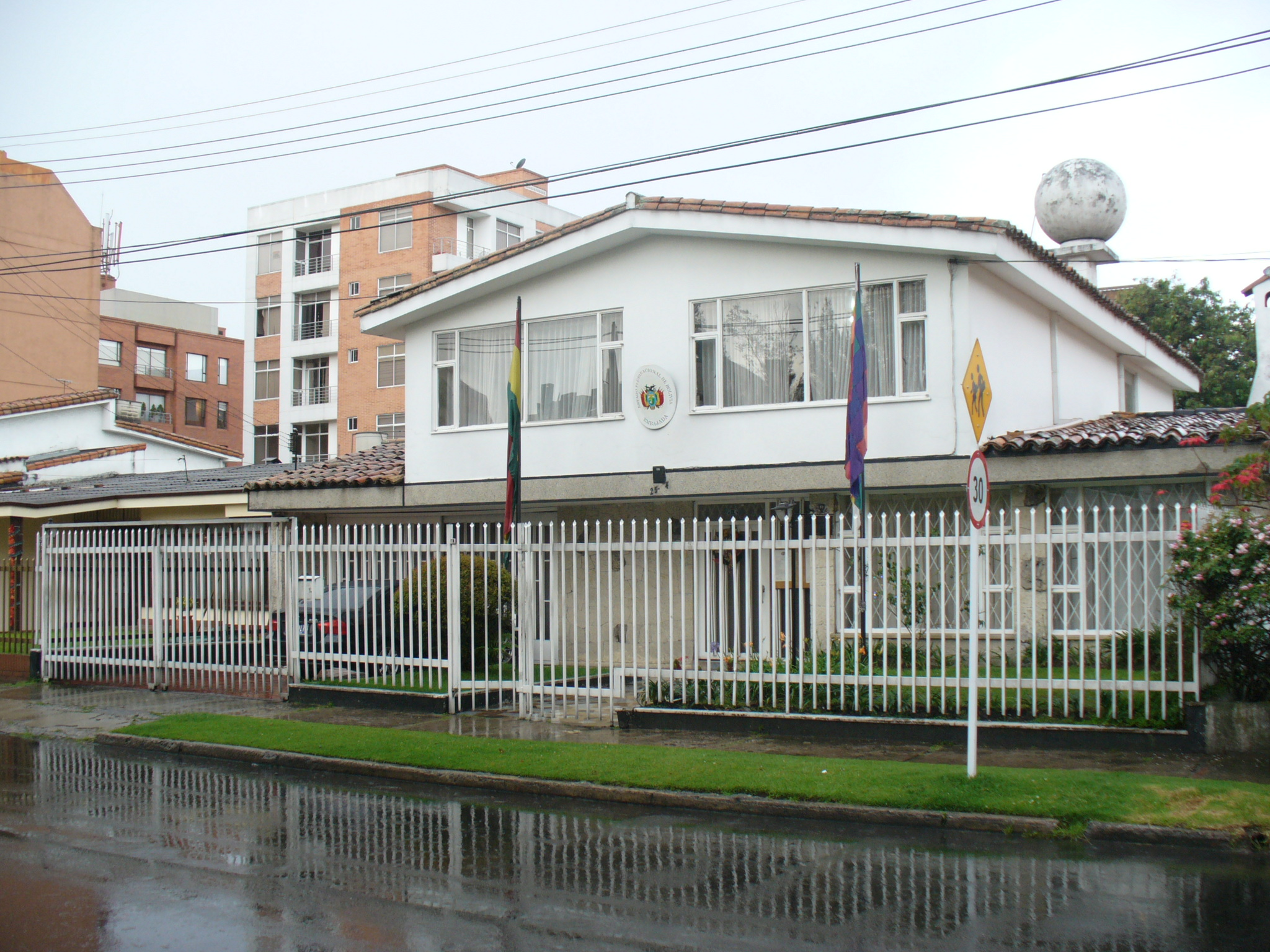
Embassy in Bogotá

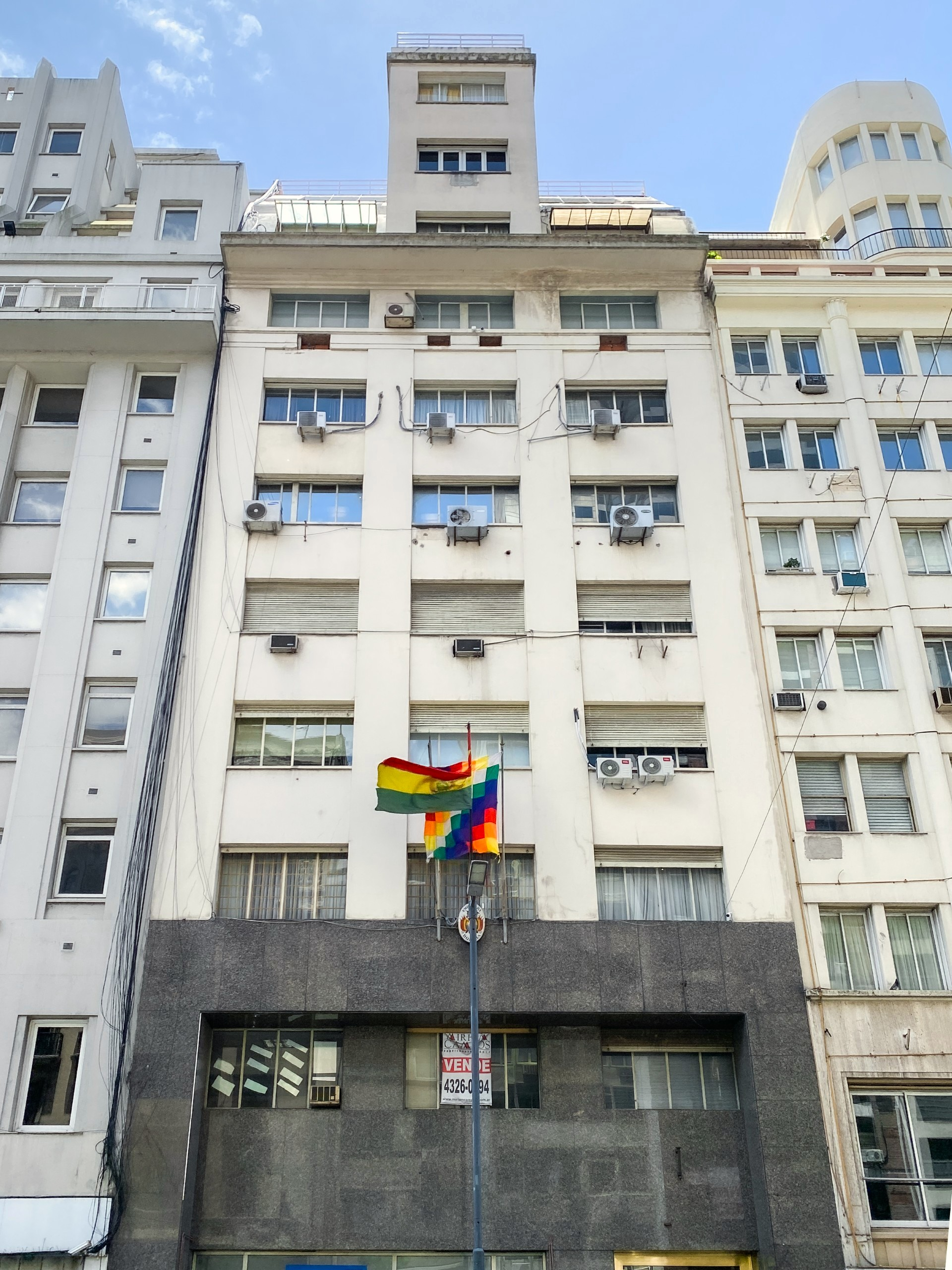
Embassy in Buenos Aires

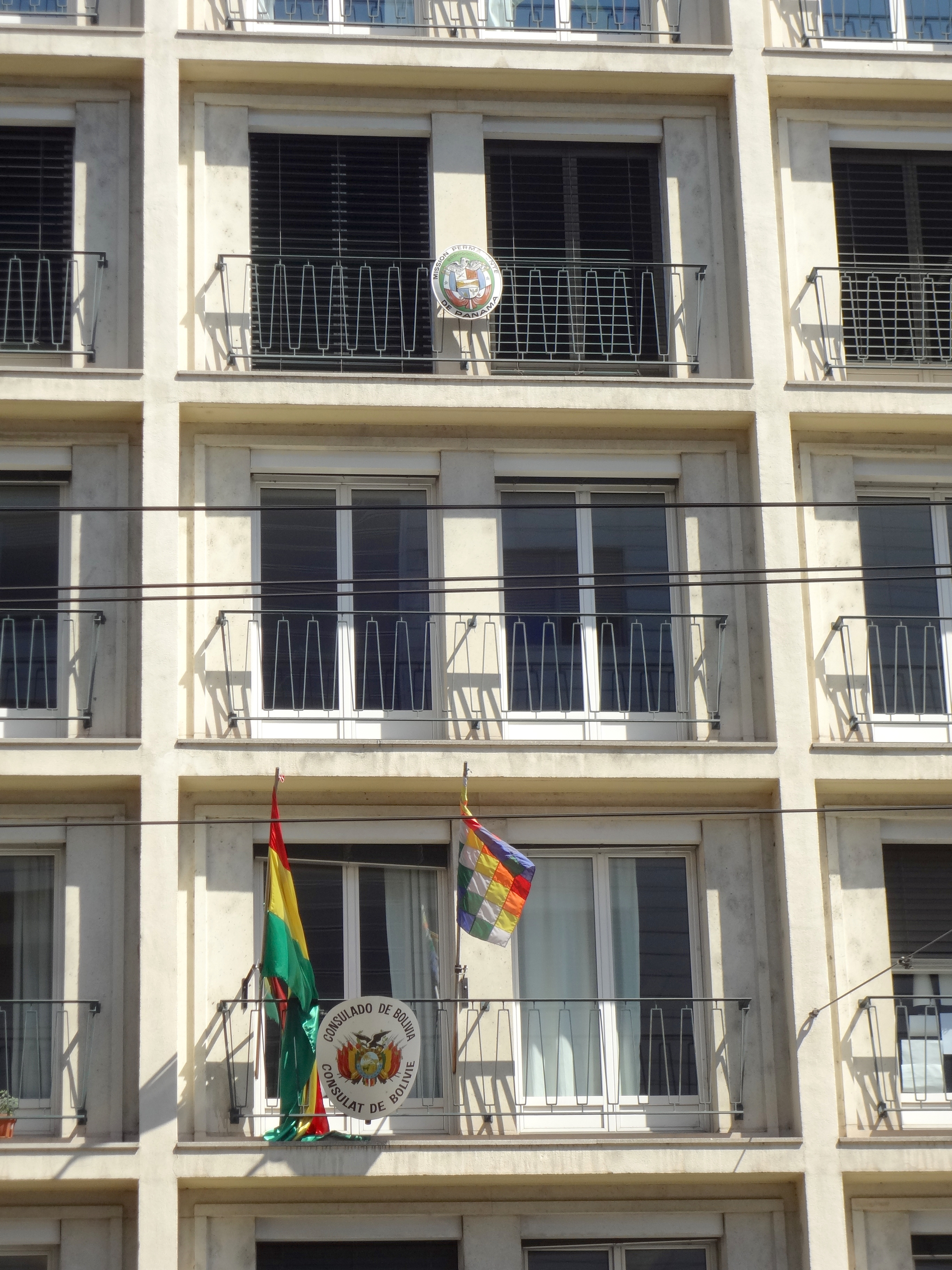
Consulate in Geneva

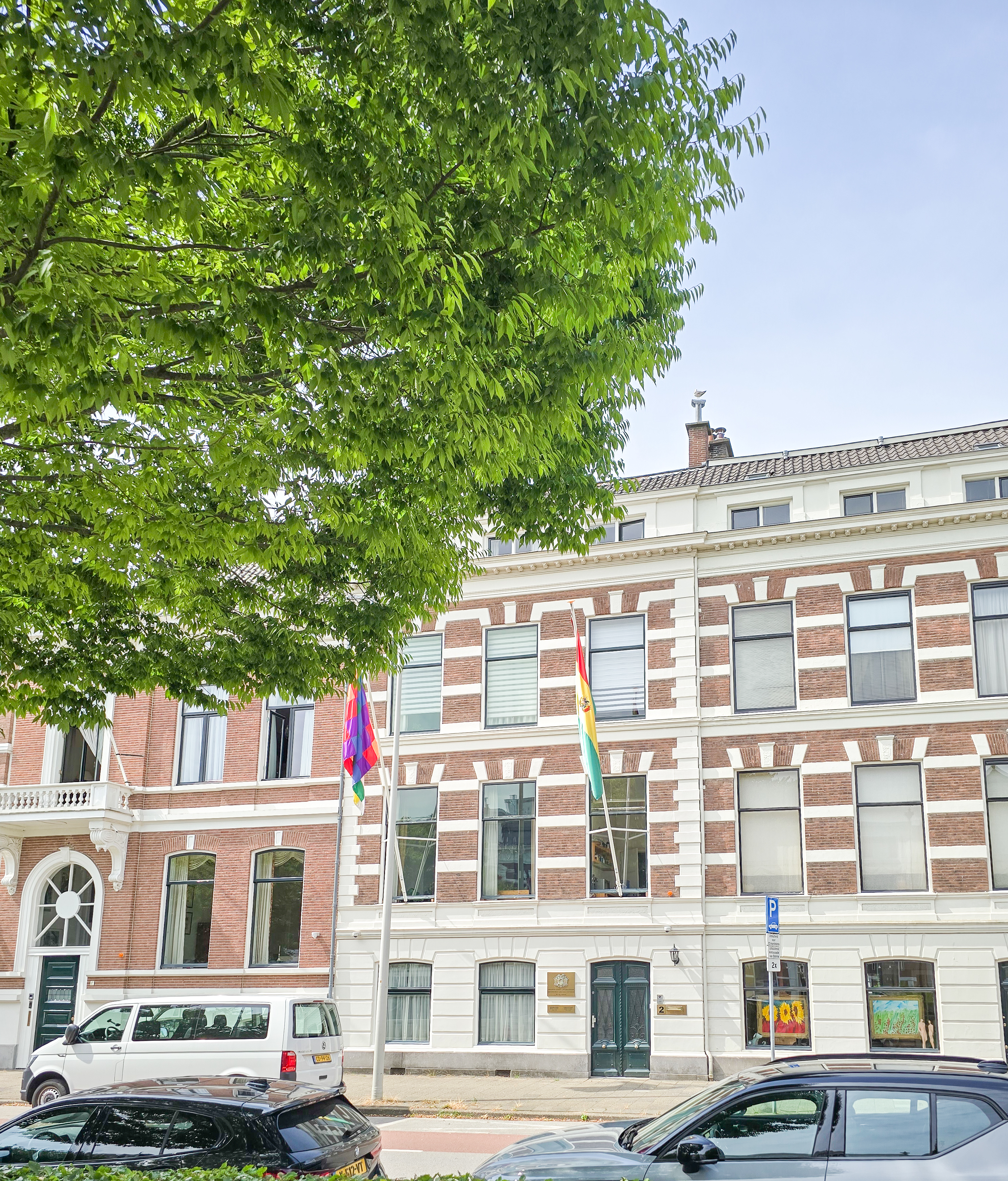
Embassy in The Hague

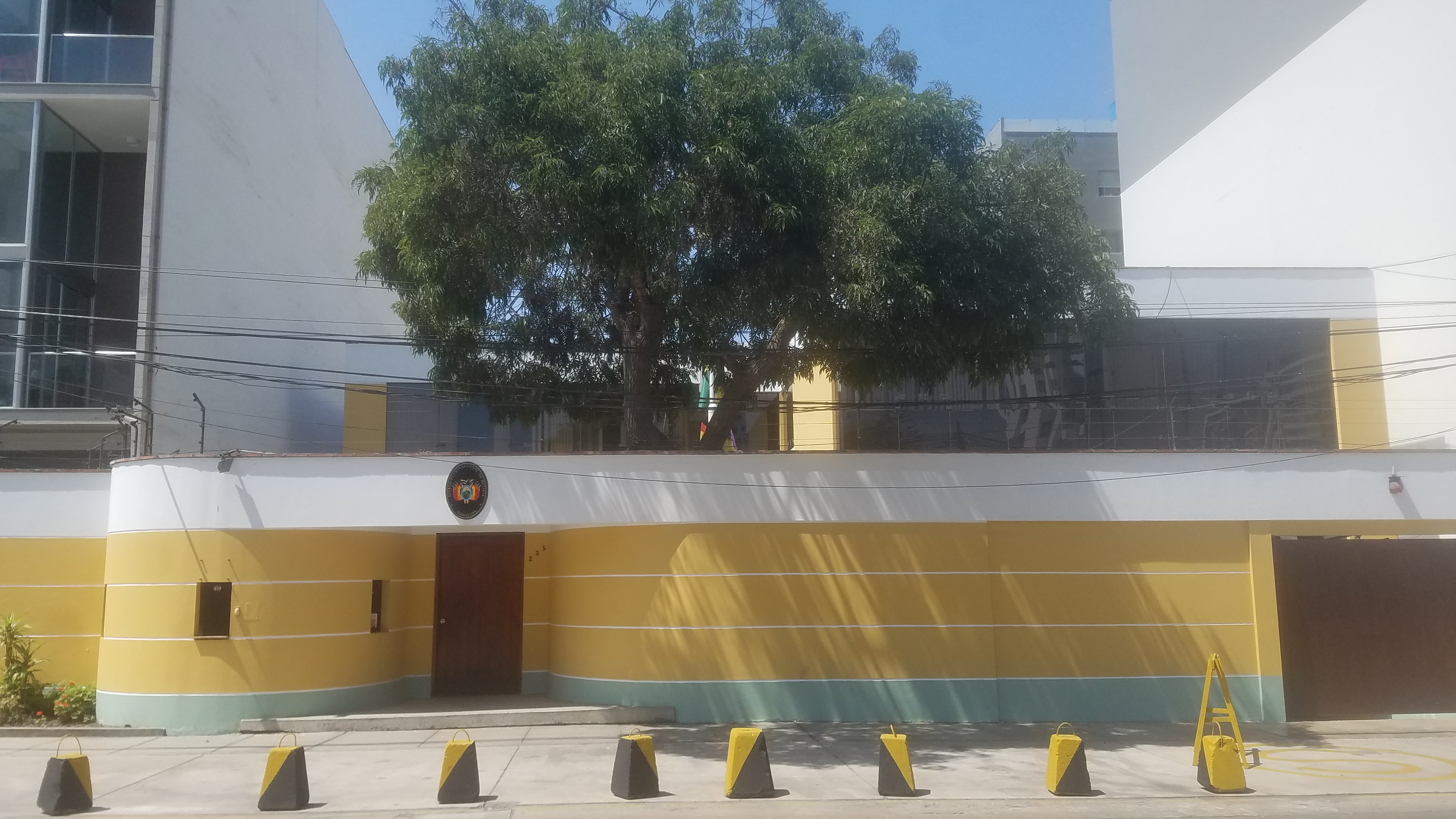
Embassy in Lima

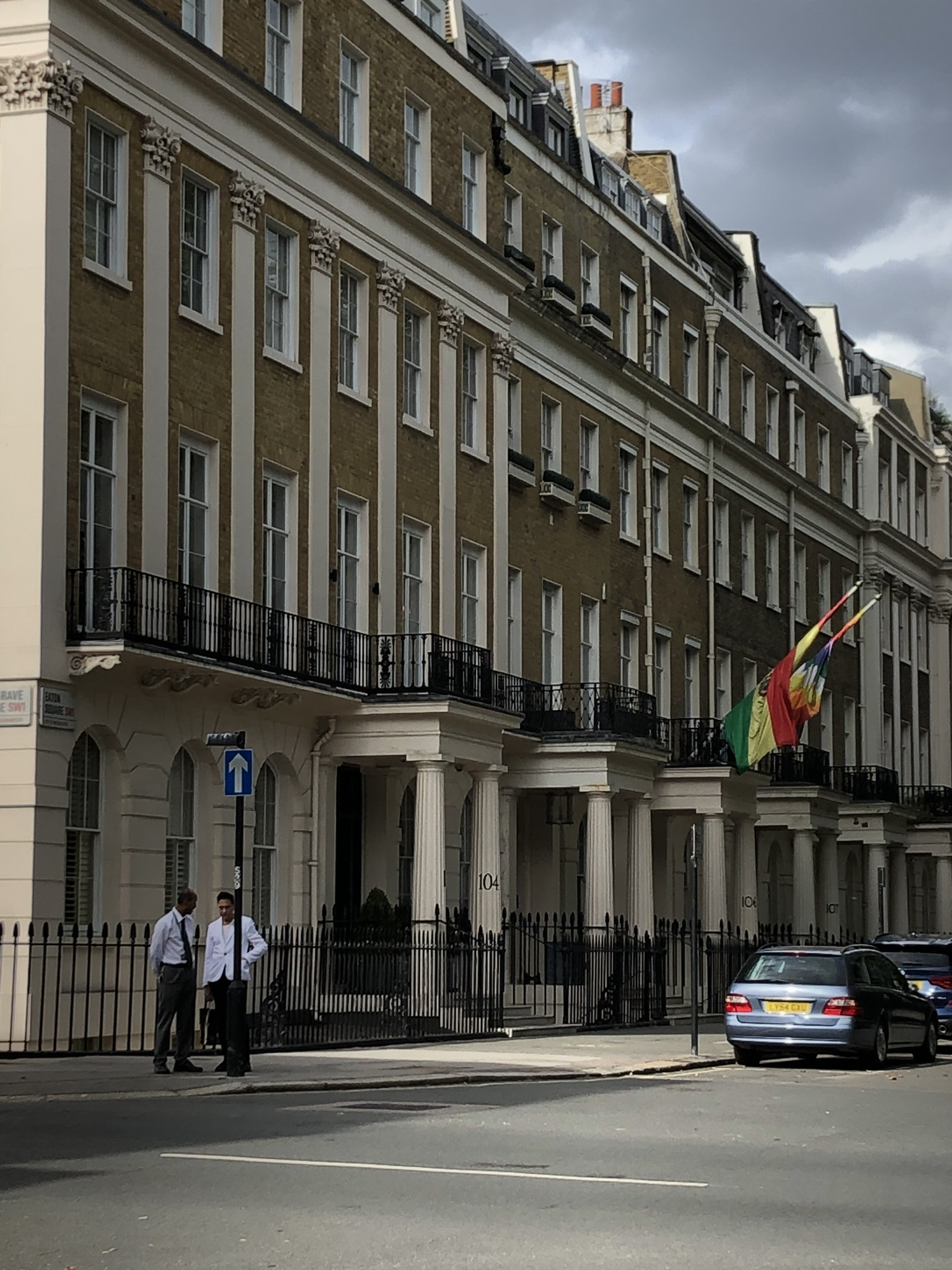
Embassy in London

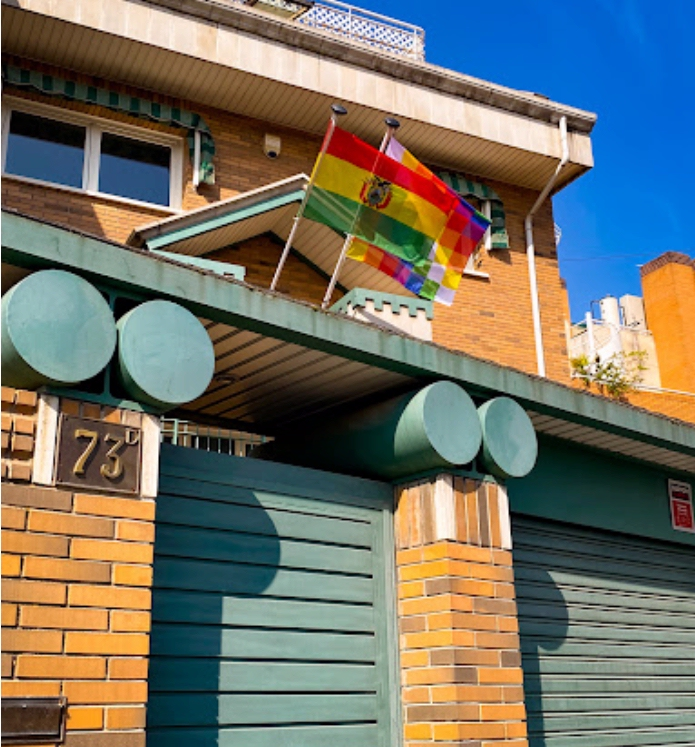
Embassy in Madrid

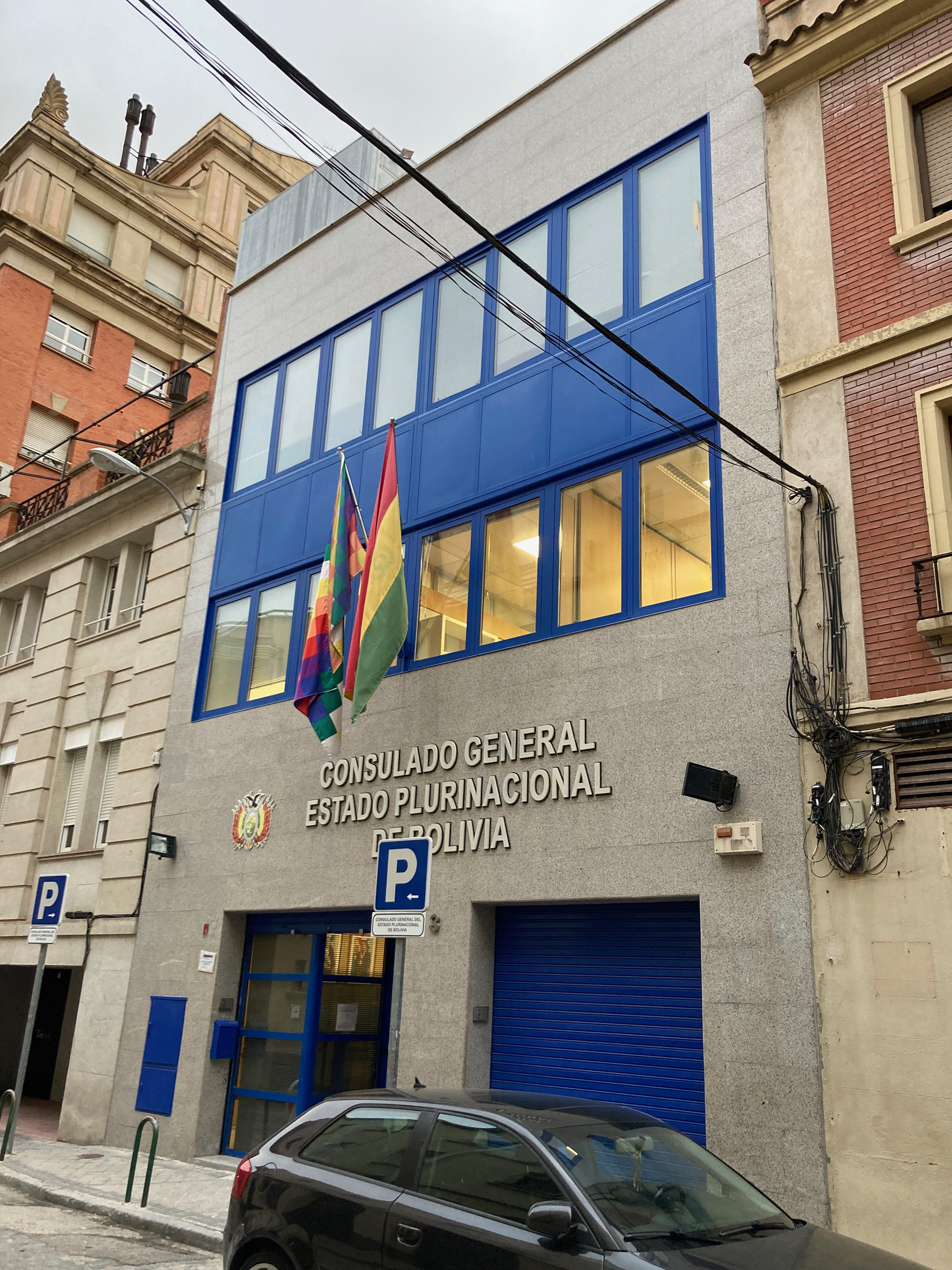
Consulate-General in Madrid

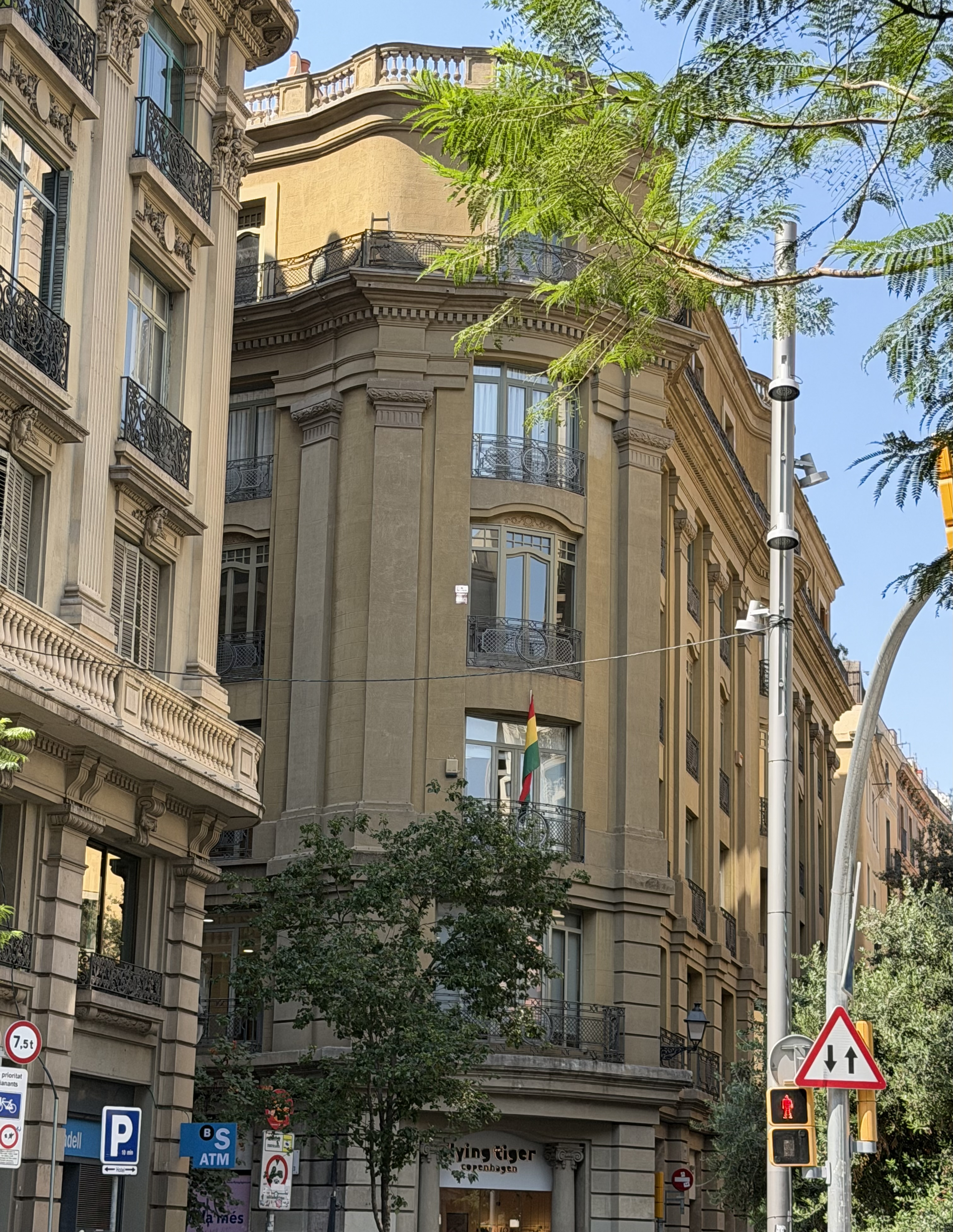
Consulate-General in Barcelona

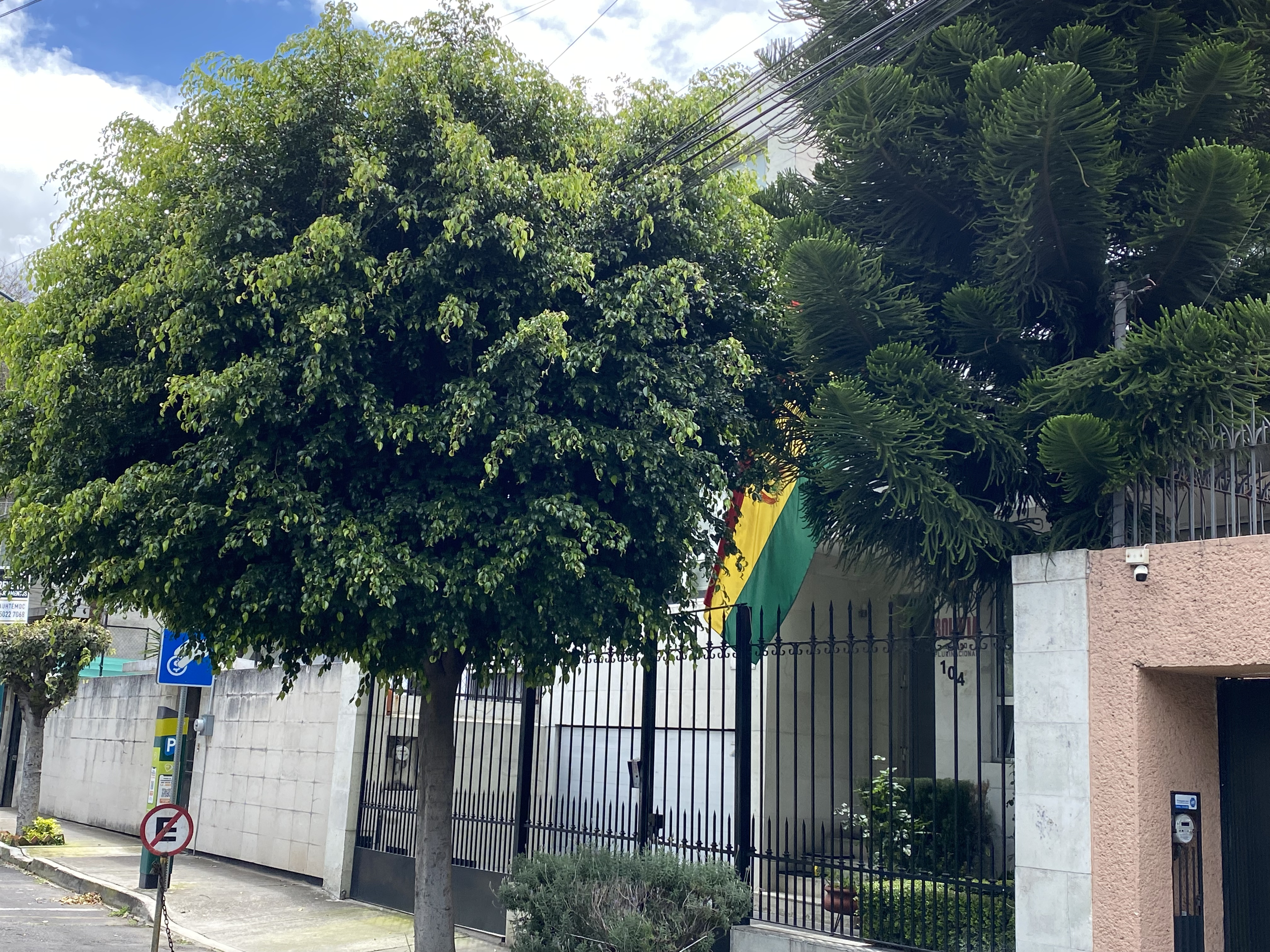
Embassy in Mexico City

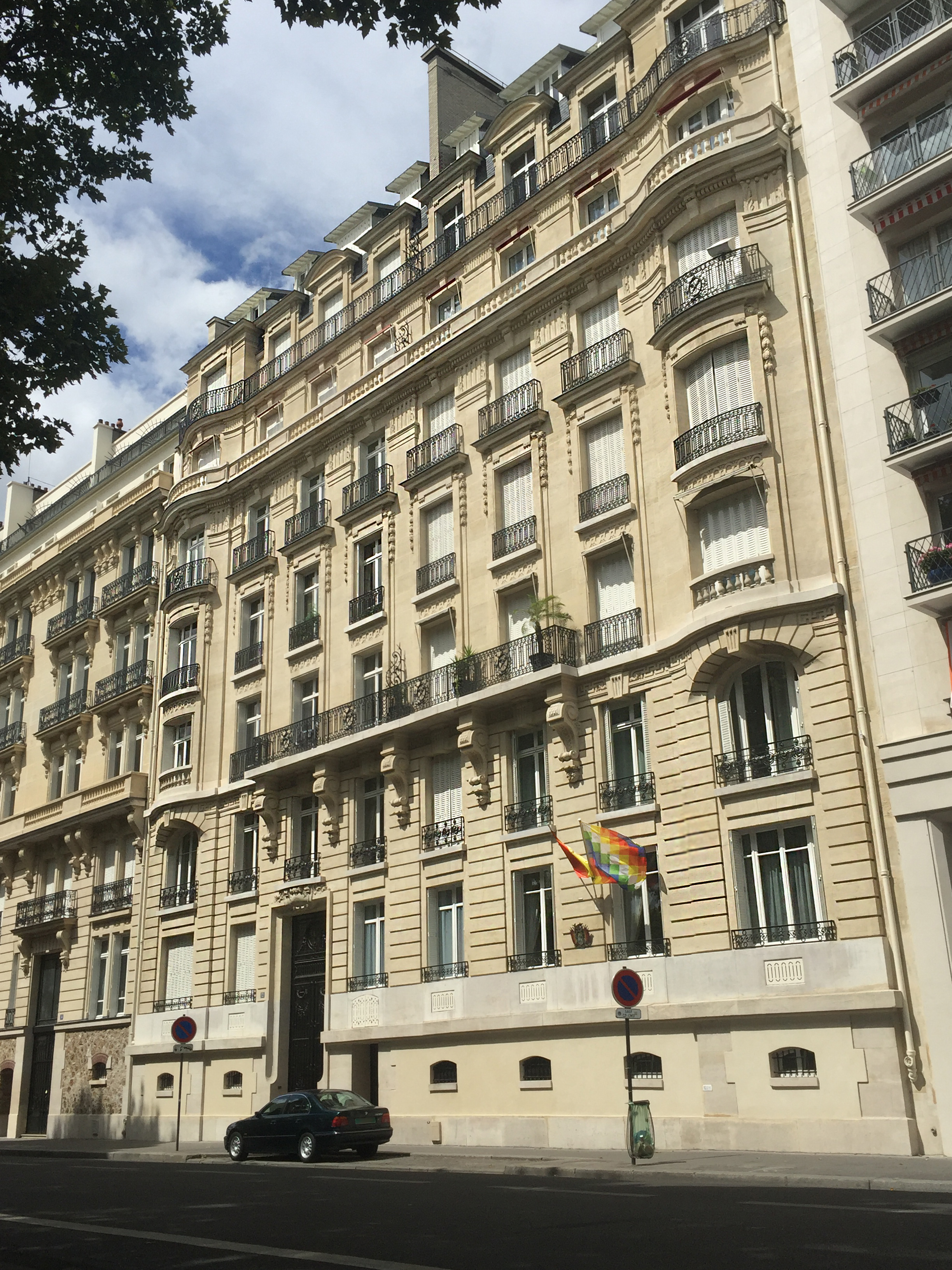
Embassy in Paris

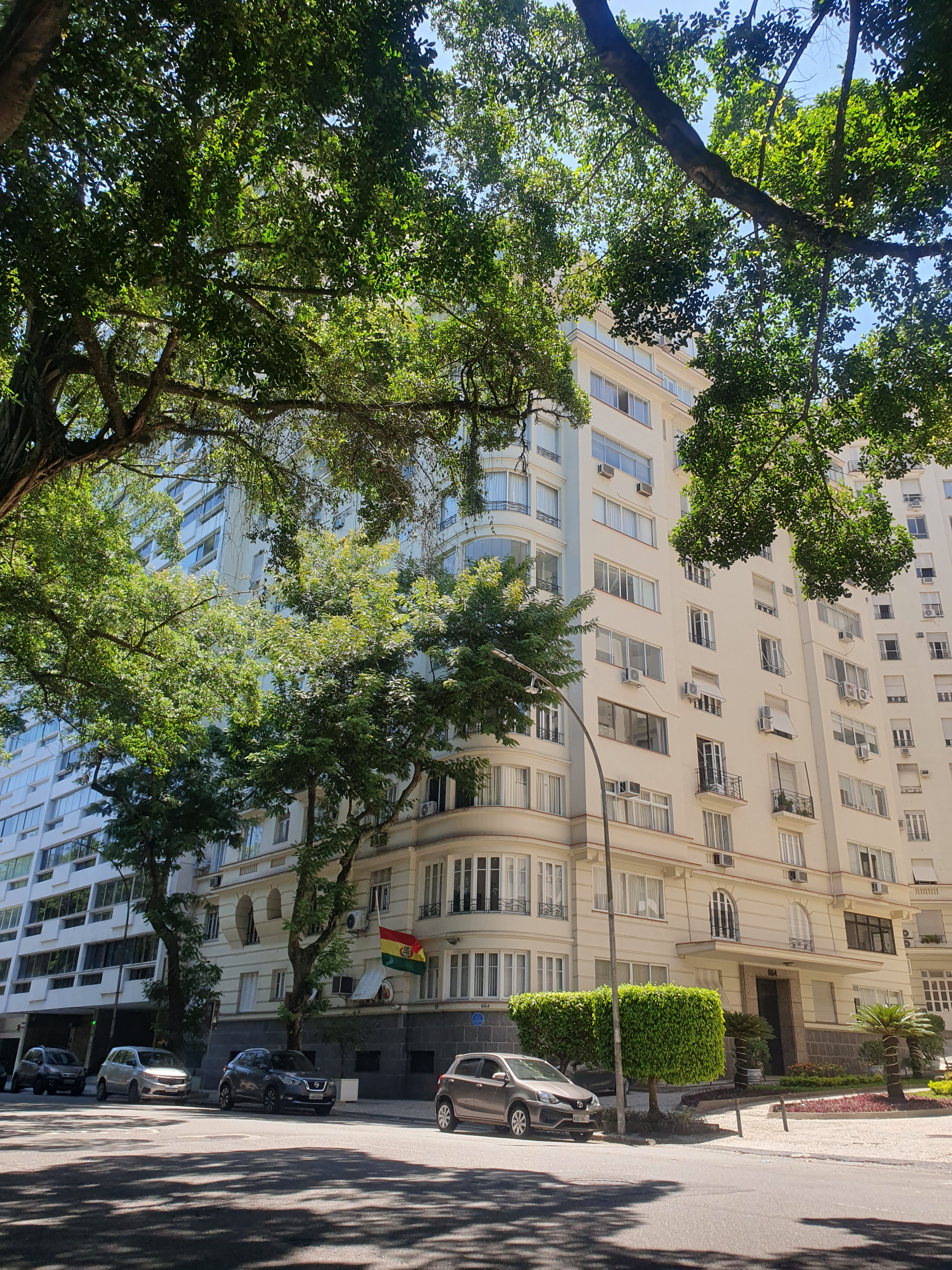
Building hosting the Consulate-General in Rio de Janeiro

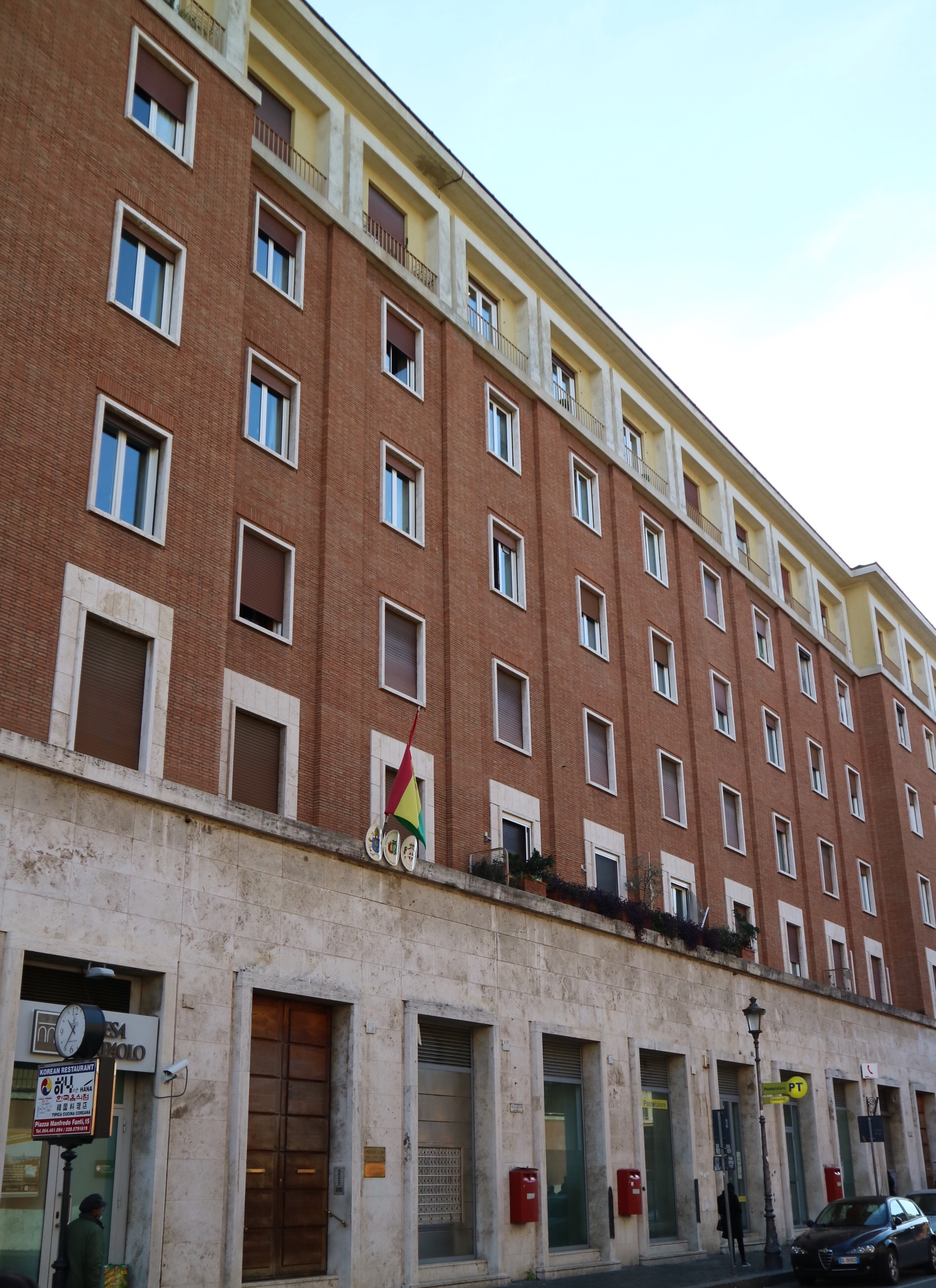
Embassy to the Holy See in Rome

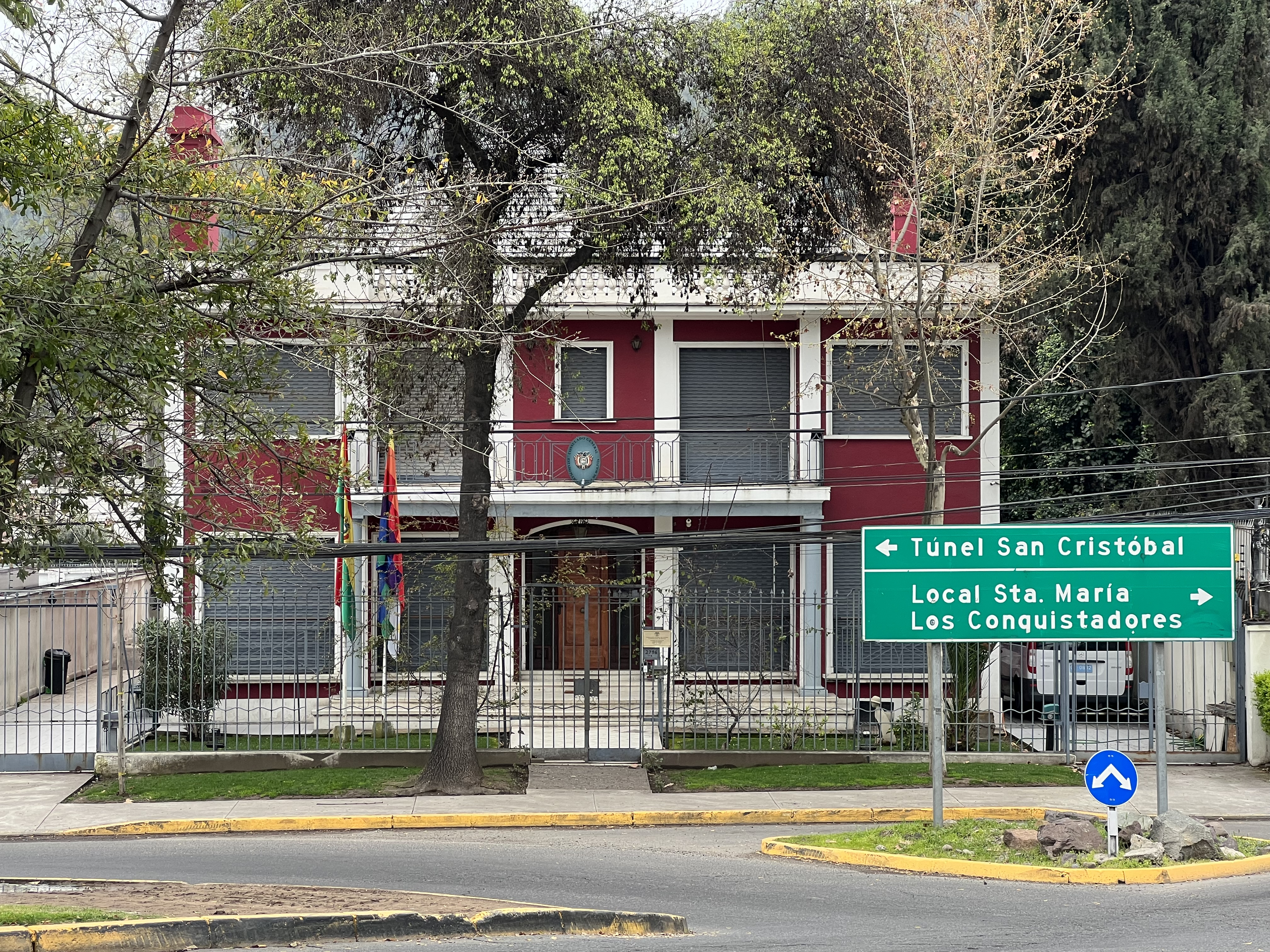
Consulate-General in Santiago de Chile

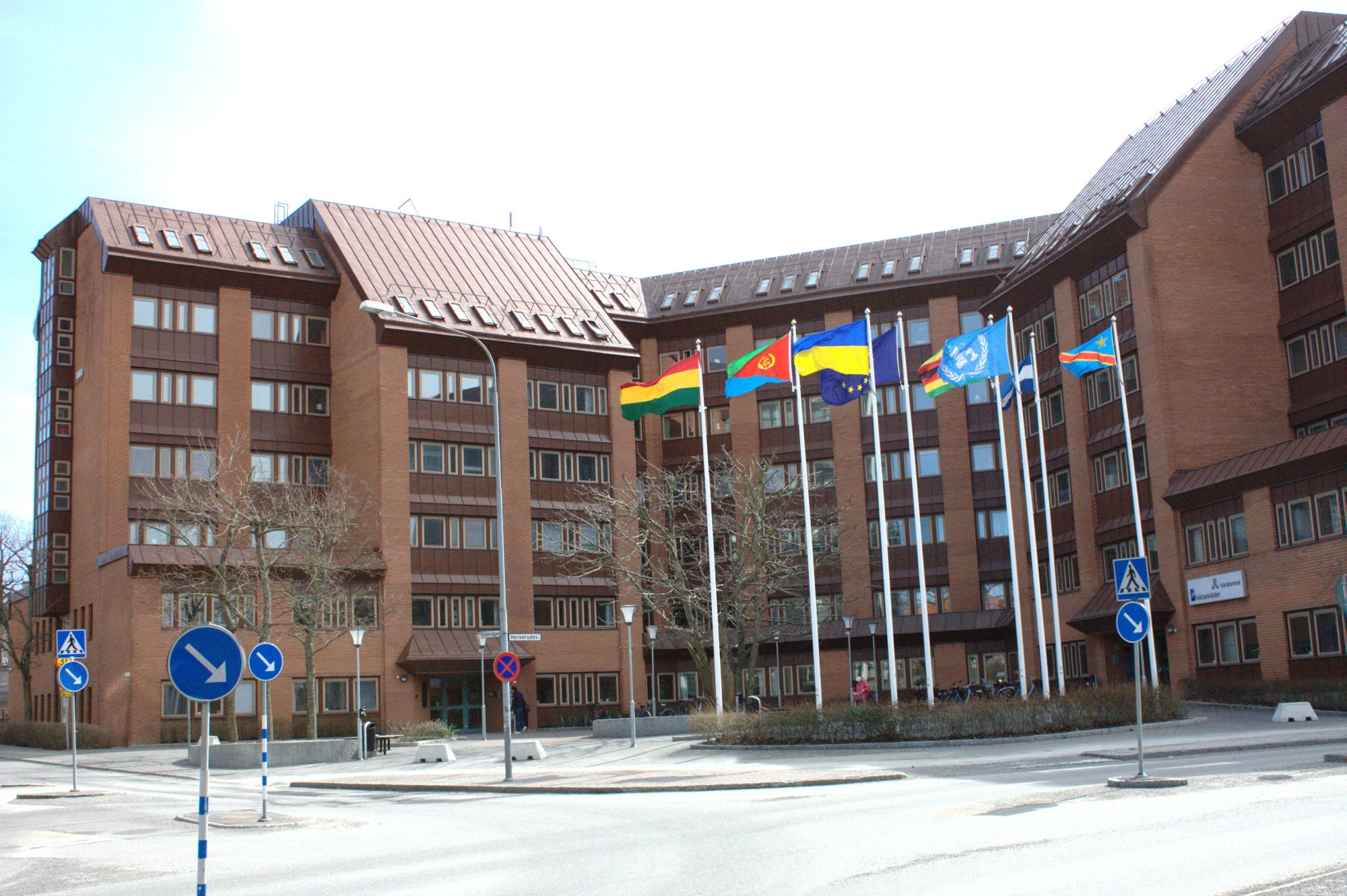
Embassy in Stockholm

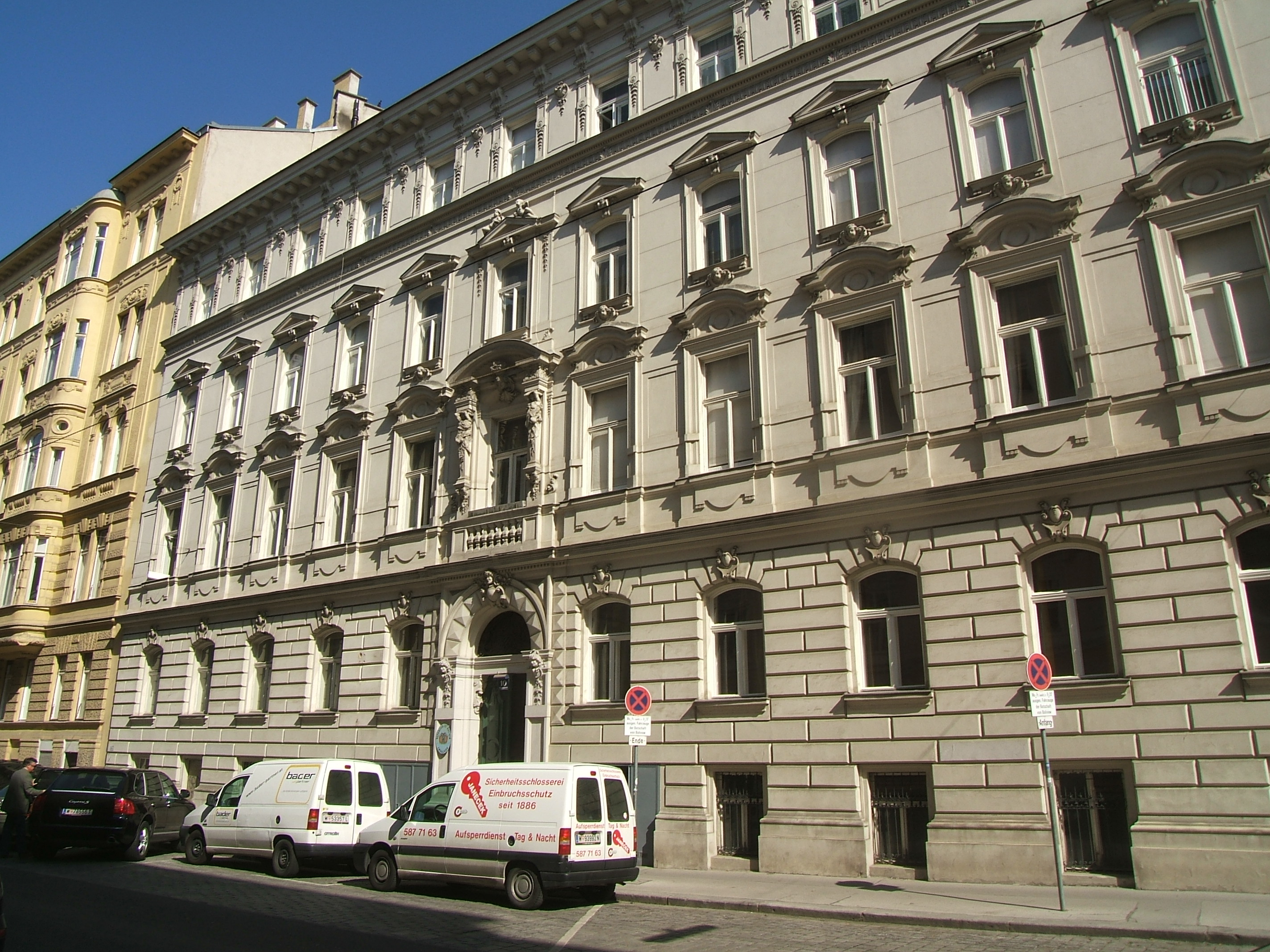
Embassy in Vienna

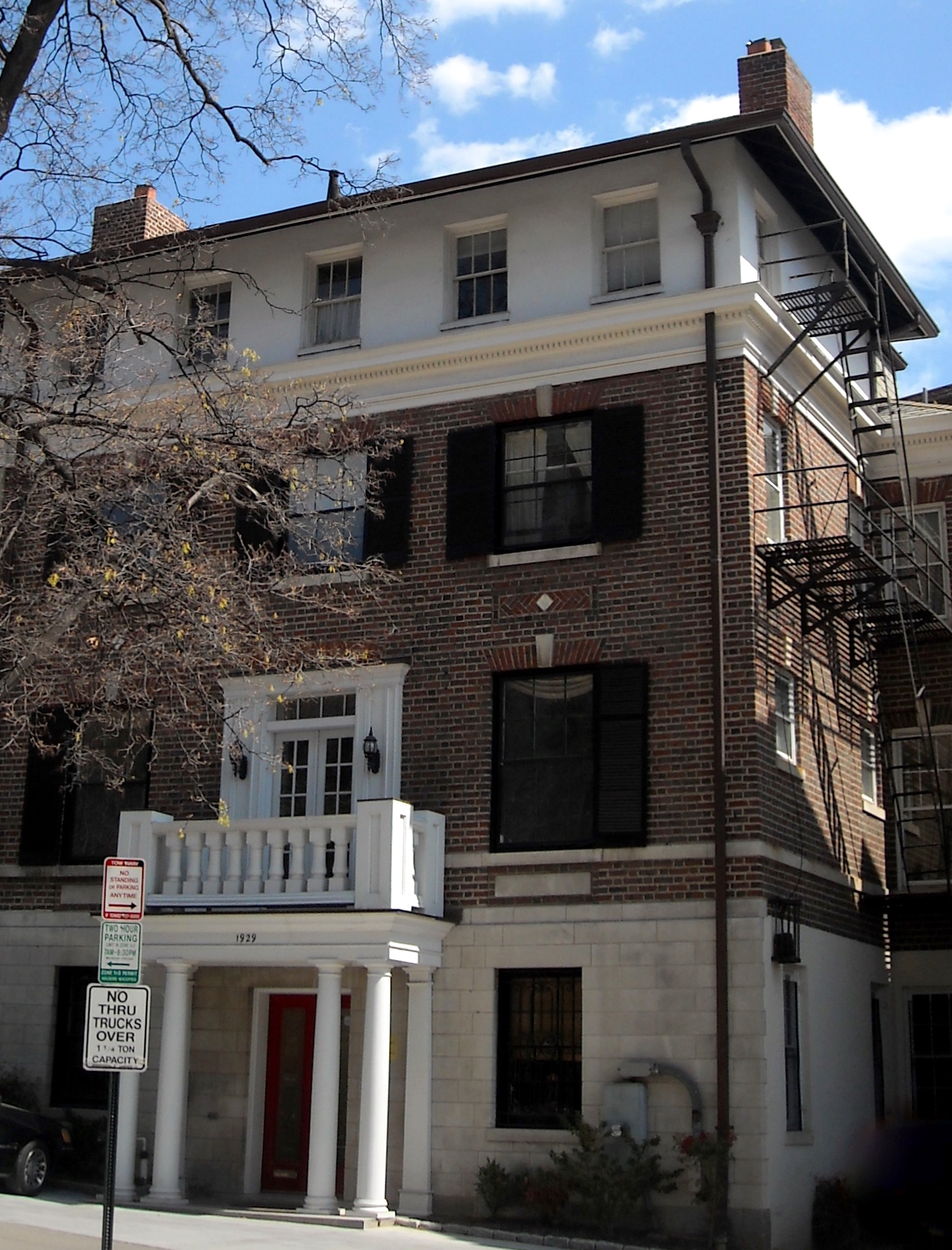
Former building hosting the Permanent Mission to the Organization of American States in Washington, D.C.

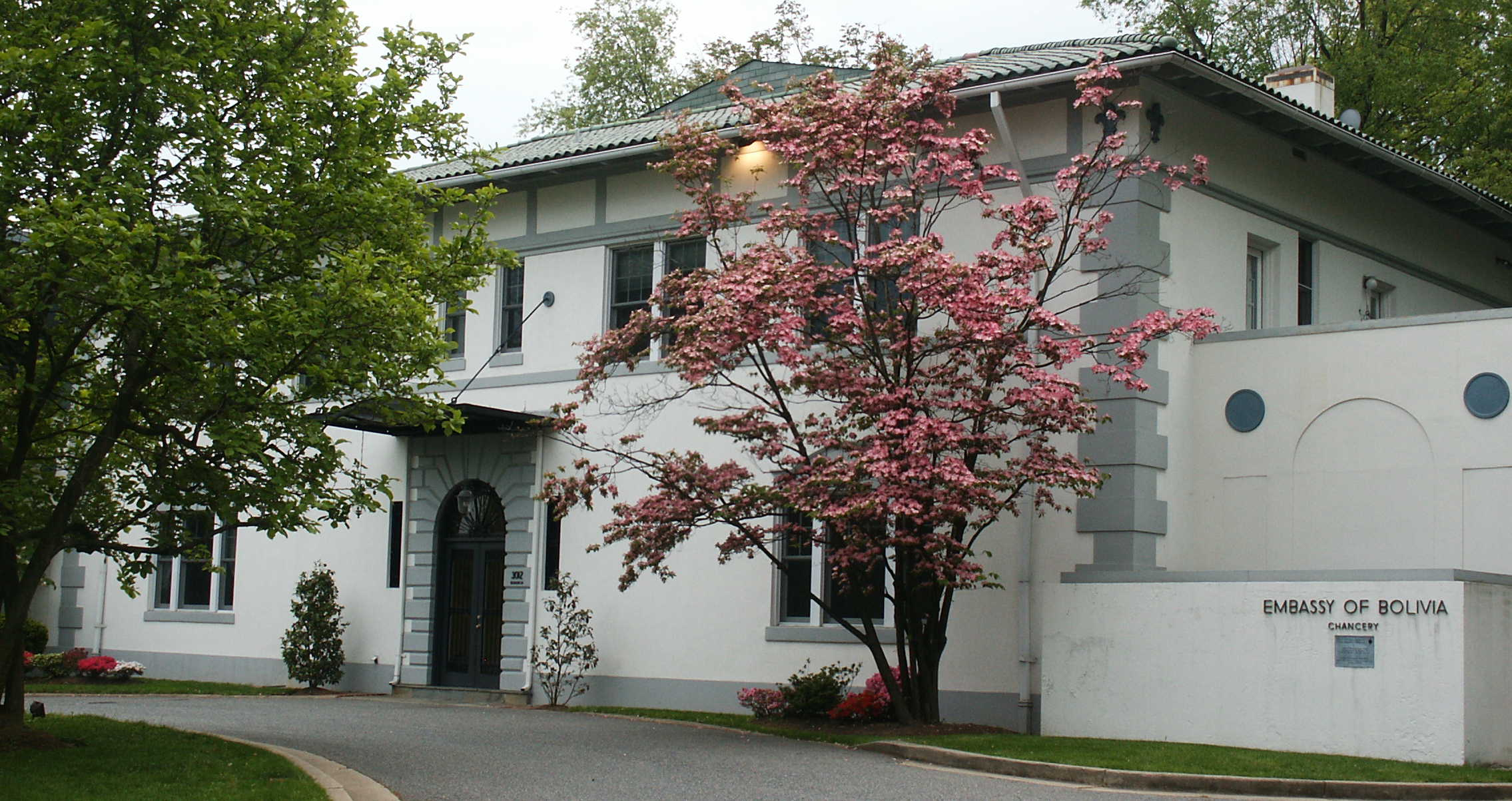
Embassy in Washington, D.C.

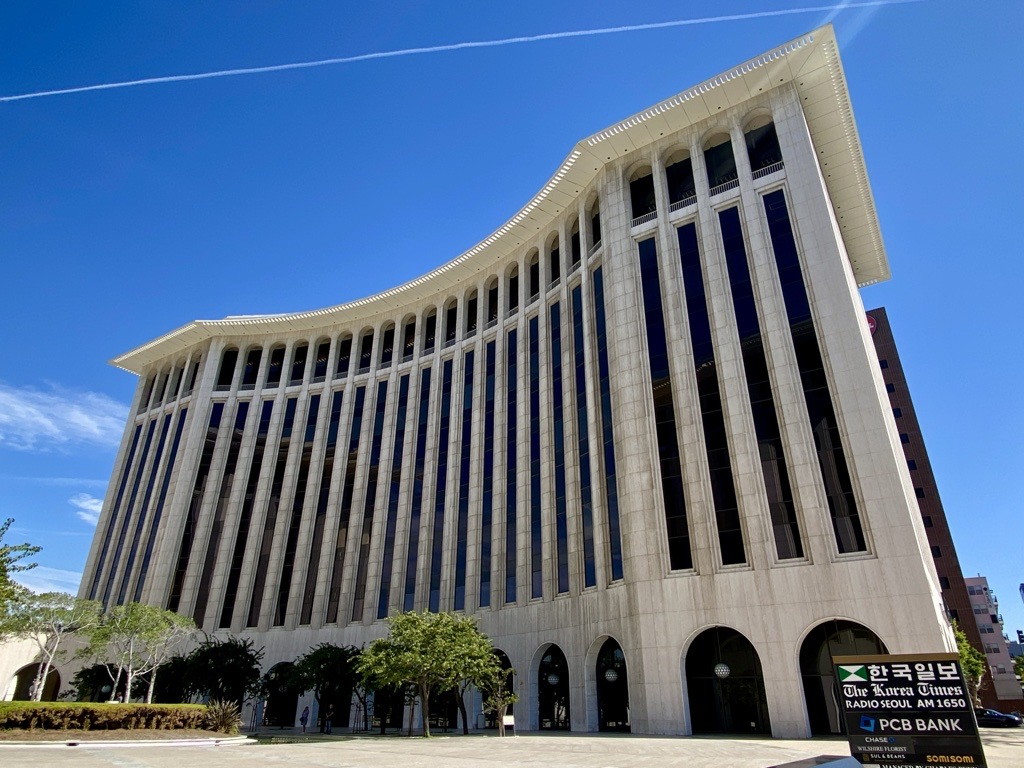
Building hosting the Consulate-General in Los Angeles

== Closed missions ==
=== Americas ===
Host country	Host city	Mission	Year closed	Ref.
Brazil	Campo Grande	Consulate	2012	
Brazil	Cuiabá	Consulate	2012	

=== Asia ===
Host country	Host city	Mission	Year closed	Ref.
China	Guangzhou	Consulate-General	1989	
Iran	Tehran	Embassy	2026	
Malaysia	Kuala Lumpur	Embassy	Unknown	

=== Europe ===
Host country	Host city	Mission	Year closed	Ref.
Romania	Bucharest	Embassy	2000	

== See also ==
- Foreign relations of Bolivia
- List of diplomatic missions in Bolivia
- Visa policy of Bolivia
