= Visa requirements for Bolivian citizens =

Administrative entry restrictions

Visa requirements for Bolivian citizens are administrative entry restrictions by the authorities of other states placed on citizens of Bolivia.

As of 2026, Bolivian citizens had visa-free or visa on arrival access to 77 countries and territories, ranking the Bolivian passport 58th in the world according to the Henley Passport Index.

Bolivian citizens may use their ID card rather than their passport when travelling to Argentina, Brazil, Chile, Colombia, Ecuador, Paraguay, Peru, Uruguay and Venezuela.

== Visa requirements map ==
Visa requirements for Bolivian citizens holding ordinary passports Bolivia Freedom of movement / ID card valid Visa not required Visa on arrival eVisa Visa available both on arrival or online Visa required

== Visa requirements ==
Visa requirements for holders of normal passports travelling for tourist purposes:

Bolivia is a full member of Mercosur. As such, its citizens enjoy unlimited access to any of the other full members (Argentina, Brazil, Paraguay and Uruguay) and associated members (Chile, Peru, Colombia and Ecuador) with the right to residence and work, with no requirement other than nationality. Citizens of these nine countries (including Bolivia) may apply for the grant of "temporary residence" for up to two years in another country of the bloc. Then, they may apply for "permanent residence" just before the term of their "temporary residence" expires.

Country	Visa requirement	Allowed stay	Notes (excluding departure fees)
Afghanistan	eVisa	30 days	Visa is not required in case born in Afghanistan or can proof that one of their parents is a national of Afghanistan or born in Afghanistan.; e-Visa : Visitors must arrive at Kabul International (KBL).
Albania	eVisa	90 days	90 days visa-free if hold a valid, multiple-entry and previously used visa or a residence permit issued by a Schengen area country, United States, Cyprus, Ireland or the United Kingdom.
Algeria	Visa required		Application for a tourist visa to Algeria must be accompanied either by a certificate of accommodation.; Persons may be denied entry if entering with a passport containing visas or stamps issued by Israel.; Visitors on tours organized to some southern regions by an approved travel agency may obtain a visa on arrival for up to 30 days.
Andorra	Visa required		Although no visa requirements exist, apply the relevant regulations of France or Spain, whichever must be transited to reach Andorra.
Angola	eVisa	30 days	
Antigua and Barbuda	eVisa		Bolivians with a visa or residency issued by Canada, USA, United Kingdom or a Schengen Member State can obtain a visa upon arrival that costs USD100 for a maximum of 30 days.
Argentina	Freedom of movement	90 days	Entry is allowed with a valid Bolivian identity card that is less than 10 years old.; Bolivians can live and work legally in Argentina under the Mercosur (and Associated Members) immigration agreement with no requirement other than being a citizen at birth or a naturalized citizen for over 5 years, and passing a background check.
Armenia	eVisa	120 days	Obtainable on arrival at Zvartnots International Airport or prior to travel online.; Visa on arrival if holding a valid residence permit or valid visa issued by the EU and Schengen member states, the USA, Australia, New Zealand, the Republic of Korea, the UK, Canada, the Russian Federation, or Japan or a valid residence permit (physical card or sticker) issued by the GCC member state.
Australia	Online Visa required		May apply online (Online Visitor e600 visa).
Austria	Visa required		
Azerbaijan	eVisa	30 days	Bolivian citizens are eligible to obtain a 30-day tourist Visa on Arrival if holding a residence permit issued by one of GCC state members. They must present their valid visa or residence permit along with their passport.
Bahamas	Visa not required	3 months	
Bahrain	eVisa / Visa on arrival	14 days	Visa is also obtainable online.; May obtain a 1 month Visa on Arrival if holding a residence permit issued by United States -(Green card holders) or one of GCC state members and if holding a visa issued by Saudi Arabia, USA, United Arab Emirates, United Kingdom or a Schengen Member State.
Bangladesh	Visa on arrival	30 days	Not available at all entry points.
Barbados	Visa not required	90 days	
Belarus	Visa required		Visas are issued on arrival at the Minsk International Airport if the support documents were submitted not later than 3 business days before expected date of arrival.
Belgium	Visa required		
Belize	Visa not required		
Benin	eVisa	30 days	Must have an international vaccination certificate.; Three types of electronic visa are offered: the e-Visa valid for 30 days for a single entry (50 EUR), the e-Visa valid for 30 days for several (multiple) entries (75 EUR), and the e-Visa valid for 90 days to make several (multiple) entries (100 EUR).
Bhutan	eVisa	90 days	The Sustainable Development Fee (SDF) of 200 USD per person, per night for almost all visitors to Bhutan. Additionally, if payment is made in US dollars from September 1, 2023 to August 31, 2027, the SDF is 100 USD.
Bosnia and Herzegovina	Visa required		30 days visa-free if hold a valid multiple entry visa and permanent residence of the European Union, Schengen Area member states, and United States of America
Botswana	eVisa	3 months	
Brazil	Freedom of movement	90 days	Entry is allowed with a valid Bolivian identity card that is less than 10 years old.; Bolivians can live and work legally in Brazil under the Mercosur (and Associated Members) immigration agreement with no requirement other than being a citizen at birth or a naturalized citizen for over 5 years, and passing a background check.
Brunei	Visa required		
Bulgaria	Visa required		
Burkina Faso	eVisa		
Burundi	Online Visa / Visa on arrival	1 month	
Cambodia	eVisa / Visa on arrival	30 days	
Cameroon	eVisa		
Canada	Visa required		US permanent residents (Green card) holders can enter visa free
Cape Verde	Visa required		
Central African Republic	Visa required		
Chad	eVisa		
Chile	Freedom of movement	90 days	Entry is allowed with a valid Bolivian identity card that is less than 10 years old.; Bolivians can live and work legally in Chile under the Mercosur (and Associated Members) immigration agreement with no requirement other than being a citizen at birth or a naturalized citizen for over 5 years, and passing a background check.; Bolivians may also get the "MERCOSUR" visa" with just their identity card, and without any cost.
China	Visa required		May get a visa on arrival for 5 days at Shenzhen(SZX) airport.
Colombia	Freedom of movement	90 days	Entry is allowed with a valid Bolivian identity card that is less than 10 years old.; Bolivians can live and work legally in Colombia under the Mercosur (and Associated Members) immigration agreement with no requirement other than being a citizen at birth or a naturalized citizen for over 5 years, and passing a background check.
Comoros	Visa on arrival	45 days	
Republic of the Congo	Visa required		
Democratic Republic of the Congo	eVisa	7 days	
Costa Rica	Visa not required	30 days	
Côte d'Ivoire	eVisa	3 months	e-Visa holders must arrive via Port Bouet Airport.
Croatia	Visa required		
Cuba	eVisa	90 days	
Cyprus	Visa required		
Czech Republic	Visa required		
Denmark	Visa required		
Djibouti	eVisa	90 days	
Dominica	Visa not required	21 days	
Dominican Republic	Visa not required	30 days	Can be extended up to 120 days
Ecuador	Freedom of movement	90 days	Entry is allowed with a valid Bolivian identity card that is less than 10 years old.; Bolivians can live and work legally in Ecuador under the Mercosur (and Associated Members) immigration agreement with no requirement other than being a citizen at birth or a naturalized citizen for over 5 years, and passing a background check.
Egypt	eVisa/Visa on arrival	30 days	
El Salvador	Visa not required		
Equatorial Guinea	eVisa		e-Visa holders must arrive via Malabo International Airport. The processing fee is 75 USD.
Eritrea	Visa required		
Estonia	Visa required		
Eswatini	Visa required		
Ethiopia	eVisa	90 days	e-Visa holders must arrive via Addis Ababa Bole International Airport.
Fiji	Online Visa		
Finland	Visa required		
France and territories	Visa required		
Gabon	eVisa	90 days	e-Visa holders must arrive via Libreville International Airport.
Gambia	Visa required		
Georgia	eVisa	90 days	
Germany	Visa required		
Ghana	Visa required		
Greece	Visa required		
Grenada	Visa required		
Guatemala	Visa required		Visa not required if holding a valid Canadian, U.S. or Schengen Visa.
Guinea	eVisa	90 days	
Guinea-Bissau	Visa on arrival	90 days	
Guyana	eVisa		
Haiti	Visa not required	3 months	
Honduras	Visa required		Visa exemption if visitors hold of a valid visa issued by Canada, the United States or a Schengen member state.
Hungary	Visa required		
Iceland	Visa required		
India	eVisa	30 days	e-Visa holders must arrive via 32 designated airports (Note: Ahmedabad; Amritsar; Bagdogra; Bengaluru; Bhubaneswar; Chandigarh; Chennai; Coimbatore; Delhi; Gaya; Goa-Dabolim; Goa-Manohar; Guwahati; Hyderabad; Indore; Jaipur; Kannur; Kochi; Kolkata; Kozhikode; Lucknow; Madurai; Mangaluru; Mumbai; Nagpur; Port Blair; Pune; Surat; Thiruvananthapuram; Tiruchirappalli; Varanasi; Visakhapatnam) or 5 designated seaports. (Note: Chennai; Cochin; Mormugao (Goa); Mumbai; Mangalore); An Indian e-Tourist Visa may only be obtained twice within 1 calendar year.; Foreigners of Pakistani origin or who hold a Pakistani Passport are not eligible for an e-Visa. Foreigners who are not Pakistani nationals, but whose parents or grandparents (either paternal or maternal) were born in, or were permanent residents in Pakistan, are also not eligible for an e-Visa.
Indonesia	eVisa	60 days	
Iran	eVisa	30 days	Passengers who have already made an application, at least two days before arrival, at the Iranian Ministry of Foreign Affair's e-Visa website and present the submission notification at the airport's visa desk may obtain a visa on arrival.
Iraq	eVisa	30 days	
Ireland	Visa required		
Israel	Visa required		
Italy	Visa required		
Jamaica	Visa not required	30 days	
Japan	Visa required		Eligible for an e-Visa if residing in one these countries Australia, Brazil, Cambodia, Canada, India, Saudi Arabia, Singapore, South Africa, Taiwan, United Arab Emirates, United Kingdom, United States.; May apply online
Jordan	eVisa / Visa on arrival	30 days	Visa can be obtained upon arrival, it will cost a total of 40 JOD, obtainable at most international ports of entry and land border crossings. (except King Hussein/Allenby Bridge)
Kazakhstan	Visa required		Kazakhstan e-Visa; E-Visa can be issued only if there is a valid invitation from the Kazakh side.; To apply for an e-Visa, you need an invitation number received from the inviting Kazakh side.; The issued electronic visa must be printed out for presentation at the state border crossing and on the territory of the Republic of Kazakhstan.; E-Visa gives the right to enter / exit the Republic of Kazakhstan only through the international airports of Astana and Almaty.; E-Visas are not issued to foreigners with whom children travel together.
Kenya	Electronic Travel Authorisation	90 days	Applications can be submitted up to 90 days prior to travel and must be submitted at least 3 days in advance.; eTA fee is 32.50 USD.; Proof of reservation at the hotel where visitors plan to stay is required (if staying with friends, an invitation letter is also acceptable).; Yellow fever vaccination certificate is required if coming from endemic countries.
Kiribati	Visa not required	90 days	90 days within any 12-month period.
North Korea	Visa required		
South Korea	Visa required		Visa-free access for 30 days to Jeju Island.
Kuwait	Visa required		e-Visa can be obtained for holders of a Residence Permit issued by a GCC member state under the following conditions: To be 18 years old and over.; The residence permit for a GCC state must be valid for at least another 3 months.; To be accompanied by the sponsor of the residence permit if the sponsor is an individual.; Does not apply to holders of a GCC Student Visa and Non-Skilled Worker Visa
Kyrgyzstan	eVisa	60 days	e-Visa holders must arrive via Manas International Airport or Osh Airport or through land crossings with China (at Irkeshtam and Torugart), Kazakhstan (at Ak-jol, Ak-Tilek, Chaldybar, Chon-Kapka), Tajikistan (at Bor-Dobo, Kulundu, Kyzyl-Bel) and Uzbekistan (at Dostuk).
Laos	eVisa / Visa on arrival	30 days	18 (Note: Savannakhet Airport; Lanetoui - Mengkang (China); Meuangmom - Wan Pong (Myanmar); Banvang - Ban Khok Phai (Thailand); Namngeun - Huay Kon (Thailand); Paksan - Bueng Kan (Thailand); Paktaphan - Pak Saeng (Thailand); Pangmon - Ban Huak (Thailand); Phoudou (Thailand); Dak ta ock - Nam Giang (Vietnam); La Lai (Vietnam); Namkan (Vietnam); Namphao - Cau Treo (Vietnam); Namsoy - Na Meo (Vietnam); Naphao - Cha Lo (Vietnam); Pahang - Long Sap (Vietnam); Panghok - Tây Trang (Vietnam); Phoukeua - Bo Y (Vietnam)) of the 33 border crossings are only open to regular visa holders.; e-Visa may be used to enter Laos through the Luang Prabang, Pakse and Vientiane international airports, 3 Thai-Lao Friendship Bridges (Note: Vientiane (Friendship Bridge 1); Savannakhet (Friendship Bridge 2); Bokeo (Friendship Bridge 4)), in Boten (road and railroad), and in Vientiane (at Khamsavath railway station).; Visa on arrival is available at the Luang Prabang, Pakse and Vientiane international airports, 4 Thai-Lao Friendship Bridges (Note: Vientiane (Friendship Bridge 1); Savannakhet (Friendship Bridge 2); Khammouane (Friendship Bridge 3); Bokeo (Friendship Bridge 4)) and 7 border crossings. (Note: Nongnokkheane - Trapeang Kriel (Cambodia); Boten - Bo han (China); Golden Triangle/Samliemkham (Thailand); Khamsavath railway station (Thailand); Namheuang - Ban Na Kraseng (Thailand); Vang tao - Chongmek (Thailand); Dansavan - Lao Bảo (Vietnam))
Latvia	Visa required		
Lebanon	Visa required		
Lesotho	Visa required		e-Visa currently suspended.
Liberia	e-VOA	3 months	
Libya	eVisa		
Liechtenstein	Visa required		
Lithuania	Visa required		
Luxembourg	Visa required		
Madagascar	eVisa/Visa on arrival	90 days	For stays of 61 to 90 days, the visa fee is 59 USD.
Malawi	eVisa / Visa on arrival	30 days	
Malaysia	Visa not required	30 days	
Maldives	Free visa on arrival	30 days	
Mali	Visa required		
Malta	Visa required		
Marshall Islands	Visa required		
Mauritania	eVisa		
Mauritius	Visa on arrival	60 days	
Mexico	Visa not required	180 days	
Micronesia	Visa not required	30 days	
Moldova	eVisa	90 days	90 days visa-free if hold a valid residence permit, a valid 'C'-type, or a valid 'D'-type visa issued by a Schengen member state or a European Union member state.
Monaco	Visa required		
Mongolia	eVisa	30 days	
Montenegro	Visa required		30 days visa-free if hold a valid visa issued by the Schengen Area, Australia, Japan, Canada, New Zealand, Ireland, the United States the United Kingdom.
Morocco	Visa required		May apply for an e-Visa if holding a valid visa or a residency document issued by one of the following countries: Schengen Area, Australia, Canada, Ireland, New Zealand, United Kingdom, United States a residency document issued by Cyprus, Japan, United Arab Emirates.
Mozambique	eVisa / Visa on arrival	30 days	
Myanmar	eVisa	28 days	e-Visa holders must arrive via Yangon, Nay Pyi Taw or Mandalay airports or via land border crossings with Thailand — Tachileik, Myawaddy and Kawthaung or India — Rih Khaw Dar and Tamu.; e-Visa is available for tourism only.
Namibia	eVisa	3 months	
Nauru	Visa required		
Nepal	Online Visa / Visa on arrival	90 days	
Netherlands	Visa required		
New Zealand	Visa required		May transit without visa if transit is through Auckland Airport and for no longer than 24 hours, subject to meeting character requirements and obtaining an Electronic Travel Authority prior to departure.; Holders of an Australian Permanent Resident Visa or Resident Return Visa may be granted a New Zealand Resident Visa on arrival permitting indefinite stay (pursuant to the Trans-Tasman Travel Arrangement), subject to meeting character requirements and obtaining an Electronic Travel Authority prior to departure.
Nicaragua	Visa not required	90 days	
Niger	Visa required		
Nigeria	eVisa	30 days	
North Macedonia	Visa required		15 days visa-free if hold a valid Type "C" multiple-entry visa for the Schengen Area or a temporary/permanent residence permit of an EU Member State or a country signatory of the Schengen Agreement
Norway	Visa required		
Oman	Visa not required / eVisa	14 days / 30 days	
Pakistan	eVisa	3 months	
Palau	Free visa on arrival	30 days	
Panama	Visa not required	90 days	
Papua New Guinea	eVisa	60 days	Visitors may apply for a visa online under the "Tourist - Own Itinerary" category.
Paraguay	Freedom of movement	90 days	Entry is allowed with a valid Bolivian identity card that is less than 10 years old.; Bolivians can live and work legally in Paraguay under the Mercosur (and Associated Members) immigration agreement with no requirement other than being a citizen at birth or a naturalized citizen for over 5 years, and passing a background check.
Peru	Freedom of movement	90 days	Entry is allowed with a valid Bolivian identity card that is less than 10 years old.; Bolivians can live and work legally in Peru under the Mercosur (and Associated Members) immigration agreement with no requirement other than being a citizen at birth or a naturalized citizen for over 5 years, and passing a background check.
Philippines	Visa not required	30 days	
Poland	Visa required		
Portugal	Visa required		
Qatar	Visa not required	30 days	
Romania	Visa required		
Russia	Visa not required	90 days	90 days within any 1 year period.
Rwanda	eVisa / Visa on arrival	30 days	
Saint Kitts and Nevis	Electronic Travel Authorisation	3 months	
Saint Lucia	Visa on arrival	6 weeks	
Saint Vincent and the Grenadines	Visa not required	3 months	
Samoa	Entry permit on arrival	90 days	
San Marino	Visa required		
São Tomé and Príncipe	eVisa		
Saudi Arabia	Visa required		Residents of GCC countries can apply for Saudi e-Visas online and residents of the United States, United Kingdom and European Union may apply for a visa on arrival
Senegal	Visa required		
Serbia	eVisa	90 days	90 days within any 180-day period. Transfers allowed.; 90 days visa-free if hold a valid visa or residents of the Cyprus, Ireland, Schengen Area member states, United Kingdom or the United States
Seychelles	Electronic Border System	3 months	Application can be submitted up to 30 days before travel.; Visitors must upload a reservation confirmation(s) for each visitor's location of stay in Seychelles.; Yellow fever vaccination certificate is required if coming from endemic countries.; Payment of the fee (EUR 10) by credit or debit card.; Valid for one journey only and it expires once exit the country.
Sierra Leone	eVisa / Visa on arrival	3 months / 30 days	
Singapore	Visa not required	30 days	
Slovakia	Visa required		
Slovenia	Visa required		
Solomon Islands	Visa required		
Somalia	eVisa	30 days	
South Africa	Visa not required	30 days	
South Sudan	eVisa		Obtainable online 30 days single entry for 100 USD, 90 days multiple entry for 200 USD and 180 days multiple entry for 350 USD.; Printed visa authorization must be presented at the time of travel.
Spain	Visa required		
Sri Lanka	ETA / Visa on arrival	30 days	
Sudan	Visa required		
Suriname	Visa not required	90 days	An entrance fee of USD 50 or EUR 50 must be paid online prior to arrival.; Multiple entry e-Visa is also available.
Sweden	Visa required		
Switzerland	Visa required		
Syria	eVisa		
Tajikistan	eVisa	60 days	
Tanzania	eVisa / Visa on arrival	90 days	
Thailand	eVisa / Visa on arrival	60 days / 15 days	Yellow fever vaccine mandatory. The cost is 2000 baht and it needs to be paid in cash before going to immigration. No ATM available, bring your own cash.
Timor-Leste	Visa on arrival	30 days	Not available at all entry points.
Togo	eVisa	15 days	
Tonga	Visa required		
Trinidad and Tobago	eVisa	90 days	
Tunisia	Visa required		
Turkey	Visa not required	3 months	
Turkmenistan	Visa required		10-day visa on arrival if holding a letter of invitation provided by a company registered in Turkmenistan with a prior approval from the Foreign Ministry. Visitors can apply to extend their stay for an additional 10 days.; When transiting between two non-bordering countries, visitors can obtain a Turkmenistan transit visa for a five-day stay. This must be applied for in advance at the Turkmenistan Embassy. Visitors must also submit copies of the visas for the country of entry into Turkmenistan and the country of departure from Turkmenistan. Visa fee is 20 USD.
Tuvalu	Visa on arrival	1 month	
Uganda	eVisa	3 months	Determined at the port of entry.
Ukraine	eVisa		
United Arab Emirates	Visa required		May apply using 'Smart service'.
United Kingdom	Visa required		
United States	Visa required		
Uruguay	Freedom of movement	3 months	Entry is allowed with a valid Bolivian identity card that is less than 10 years old.; Bolivians can live and work legally in Uruguay under the Mercosur (and Associated Members) immigration agreement with no requirement other than being a citizen at birth or a naturalized citizen for over 5 years, and passing a background check.
Uzbekistan	eVisa	30 days	
Vanuatu	Visa required		
Vatican City	Visa required		Open borders but de facto follows Italian visa policy.
Venezuela	Visa not required	90 days	Entry is allowed with a valid Bolivian identity card that is less than 10 years old.
Vietnam	eVisa	90 days	Phú Quốc without a visa for up to 30 days.
Yemen	Visa required		Yemen introduced an e-Visa system for visitors who meet certain eligibility requirements (group travel of 10 or more people, business trips, and transit etc.).
Zambia	eVisa / Visa on arrival	90 days	
Zimbabwe	eVisa	1 month	

=== Unrecognized or partially recognized countries ===
Countries	Conditions of access	Notes
Abkhazia	Visa required	Tourists from all countries (except Georgia) can visit Abkhazia for a period not exceeding 24 hours as part of an organized tourist group.
Kosovo	Visa required	Visa not required for holders of a valid biometric residence permit issued by one of the Schengen member states or a valid multi-entry Schengen Visa, a holder of a valid Laissez-Passer issued by United Nations Organizations, NATO, OSCE, Council of Europe or European Union a holder of a valid travel documents issued by EU Member and Schengen States, United States of America, Canada, Australia and Japan based on the 1951 Convention on Refugee Status or the 1954 Convention on the Status of Stateless Persons, as well as holders of valid travel documents for foreigners (max. 15 days stay)
Northern Cyprus	Visa not required	
Palestine	Visa required	
Sahrawi Arab Democratic Republic	Visa regime undefined	Undefined visa regime in the Western Sahara controlled territory.
South Ossetia	Visa required	To enter South Ossetia, visitors must have a multiple-entry visa for Russia and register their stay with the Migration Service of the Ministry of Internal Affairs within 3 days.
Taiwan	Visa required	
Transnistria	Visa not required	45 days

=== Dependent and autonomous territories ===
Countries	Conditions of access	Notes
United Kingdom
Anguilla	eVisa	Holders of a valid visa or residence permit for the United Kingdom, United States or Canada do not need a visa.
Bermuda	Visa required	
British Virgin Islands	Visa not required	1 month
Cayman Islands	Visa required	
Falkland Islands	Visa required	
Gibraltar	Visa required	UK visa required.
Guernsey	Visa required	
Isle of Man	Visa required	
Jersey	Visa required	
Montserrat	eVisa	Holders of a valid visa for the United Kingdom, United States, Canada or an EU country do not need a visa
Saint Helena	eVisa	
China
Hong Kong	Visa not required	30 days
Macau	Visa on arrival	30 days
Denmark
Faroe Islands	Visa required	
Greenland	Visa required	
Ecuador
Galápagos	Pre-registration required	60 days; Visitors must pre-register to receive a 20 USD Transit Control Card (TCT).
Netherlands
Aruba	Visa required	Visa not required if holding a valid visa or residence permit for a Schengen country, Ireland or the United Kingdom, or a residence permit for Canada, the United States, the French overseas departments (French Guiana, Guadeloupe, Martinique, Mayotte and Réunion) or the French overseas collectivities of Saint Barthélemy and Saint Martin.
Caribbean Netherlands (includes Bonaire, Sint Eustatius and Saba)	Visa required	Visa not required if holding a valid visa or residence permit for a Schengen country, Ireland or the United Kingdom, or a residence permit for Canada, the United States, the French overseas departments (French Guiana, Guadeloupe, Martinique, Mayotte and Réunion) or the French overseas collectivities of Saint Barthélemy and Saint Martin.
Curaçao	Visa required	Visa not required if holding a valid visa or residence permit for a Schengen country, Ireland or the United Kingdom, or a residence permit for Canada, the United States, the French overseas departments (French Guiana, Guadeloupe, Martinique, Mayotte and Réunion) or the French overseas collectivities of Saint Barthélemy and Saint Martin.
Sint Maarten	Visa required	Visa not required if holding a valid visa or residence permit for a Schengen country, Ireland or the United Kingdom, or a residence permit for Canada, the United States, the French overseas departments (French Guiana, Guadeloupe, Martinique, Mayotte and Réunion) or the French overseas collectivities of Saint Barthélemy and Saint Martin.
France
French Guiana	Visa not required	90 days
French Polynesia	Visa not required	90 days
(France) French West Indies	Visa not required	90 days includes overseas departments of Guadeloupe and Martinique.
(France) Saint Martin and Saint Barthélemy	Visa not required	90 days
Mayotte	Visa not required	90 days
New Caledonia	Visa not required	90 days
Réunion	Visa not required	90 days
Saint Pierre and Miquelon	Visa not required	90 days
Wallis and Futuna	Visa not required	90 days
New Zealand
Cook Islands	Visa not required	31 days
Niue	Visa not required	30 days
Tokelau	Visa required	
United States
American Samoa	Visa required	
Guam	Visa required	
Northern Mariana Islands	Visa required	
U.S. Virgin Islands	Visa required	
Puerto Rico	Visa required	

== Non-visa restrictions ==
=== Blank passport pages ===
Many countries require a minimum number of blank pages to be available in the passport being presented, typically one or two pages. Endorsement pages, which often appear after the visa pages, are not counted as being valid or available.

=== Vaccination ===
Cover of the new International Certificate of Vaccination issued by the Bureau of Quarantine in the Philippines since 2021

The African countries of Angola, Benin, Burkina Faso, Burundi, Cameroon, Central African Republic, Democratic Republic of the Congo, Republic of the Congo, Côte d'Ivoire, Gabon, Ghana, Guinea-Bissau, Mali, Niger, Sierra Leone and Togo, South Sudan and Uganda, along with French Guiana in South America, require all incoming passengers older than nine months to one year, to have a current International Certificate of Vaccination or Prophylaxis.

Some other countries require vaccination only if the passenger is coming from an infected area or has visited one recently or has transited for 12 hours in those countries: Algeria, Botswana, Cabo Verde, Chad, Djibouti, Egypt, Eswatini, Ethiopia, Gambia, Ghana, Guinea, Lesotho, Libya, Equatorial Guinea, Eritrea, Madagascar, Malawi, Mauritania, Mauritius, Mozambique, Namibia, Nigeria, Papua New Guinea, Seychelles, Somalia, South Africa, Sudan, Tunisia, Uganda, Tanzania, Zambia and Zimbabwe.

=== Passport validity length ===
Very few countries, such as Paraguay, just require a valid passport on arrival.

However many countries and groupings now require only an identity card – especially from their neighbours. Other countries may have special bilateral arrangements that depart from the generality of their passport validity length policies to shorten the period of passport validity required for each other's citizens or even accept passports that have already expired (but not been cancelled).

Some countries, such as Japan, Ireland and the United Kingdom, require a passport valid throughout the period of the intended stay.

In the absence of specific bilateral agreements, countries requiring passports to be valid for at least 6 more months on arrival include Afghanistan, Algeria, Anguilla, Bahrain, Bhutan, Botswana, British Virgin Islands, Brunei, Cambodia, Cameroon, Cape Verde, Cayman Islands, Central African Republic, Chad, Comoros, Costa Rica, Côte d'Ivoire, Curaçao, Ecuador, Egypt, El Salvador, Equatorial Guinea, Fiji, Gabon, Guinea Bissau, Guyana, Haiti, India, Indonesia, Iran, Iraq, Israel, Jordan, Kenya, Kiribati, Kuwait, Laos, Madagascar, Malaysia, Marshall Islands, Mongolia, Myanmar, Namibia, Nepal, Nicaragua, Nigeria, Oman, Palau, Papua New Guinea, Peru, Philippines, Qatar, Rwanda, Samoa, Saudi Arabia, Singapore, Solomon Islands, Somalia, Sri Lanka, Sudan, Suriname, Tanzania, Thailand, Timor-Leste, Tokelau, Tonga, Turkey, Tuvalu, Uganda, United Arab Emirates, Vanuatu, Venezuela, and Vietnam.

Countries requiring passports valid for at least 4 months on arrival include Micronesia and Zambia.

Countries requiring passports with a validity of at least 3 months beyond the date of intended departure include Azerbaijan, Bosnia and Herzegovina, Honduras, Montenegro, Nauru, Moldova and New Zealand. Similarly, the EEA countries of Iceland, Liechtenstein, Norway, all European Union countries (except Ireland) together with Switzerland also require 3 months validity beyond the date of the bearer's intended departure unless the bearer is an EEA or Swiss national.

Countries requiring passports valid for at least 3 months on arrival include Albania, North Macedonia, Panama, and Senegal.

Bermuda requires passports to be valid for at least 45 days upon entry.

Countries that require a passport validity of at least one month beyond the date of intended departure include Eritrea, Hong Kong, Lebanon, Macau, the Maldives and South Africa.

==== Maximum passport age ====
Countries of the Schengen area require non-EU passports to be less than 10 years old upon entry.

=== Criminal record ===
Some countries, including Australia, Canada, Fiji, New Zealand and the United States, routinely deny entry to non-citizens who have a criminal record, while others impose restrictions depending on the type of conviction and the length of the sentence.

=== Persona non grata ===
The government of a country can declare a diplomat persona non grata, banning them from entering the country or expelling them if they have already entered. In non-diplomatic use, the authorities of a country may also declare a foreigner persona non grata permanently or temporarily, usually because of unlawful activity.

=== Israeli stamps ===
Kuwait, Lebanon, Libya, and Yemen do not allow entry to people with passport stamps from Israel or whose passports have either a used or an unused Israeli visa, or where there is evidence of previous travel to Israel such as entry or exit stamps from neighbouring border posts in transit countries such as Jordan and Egypt.

To circumvent this Arab League boycott of Israel, the Israeli immigration services have now mostly ceased to stamp foreign nationals' passports on either entry to or exit from Israel (unless the entry is for some work-related purposes). Since 15 January 2013, Israel no longer stamps foreign passports at Ben Gurion Airport. Passports are still (as of 22 June 2017) stamped at Erez when passing into and out of Gaza.

Iran refuses admission to holders of passports containing an Israeli visa or stamp that is less than 12 months old.

=== Biometrics ===
Several countries mandate that all travellers, or all foreign travellers, be fingerprinted on arrival and will refuse admission to or even arrest travellers who refuse to comply. In some countries, such as the United States, this may apply even to transit passengers who merely wish to change planes rather than go landside.

Fingerprinting countries/regions include Afghanistan, Argentina, Brunei, Cambodia, China, Ethiopia, Ghana, Guinea, India, Japan, Kenya (both fingerprints and a photo are taken), Malaysia upon entry and departure, Mongolia, Saudi Arabia, the Schengen Area, Singapore, South Korea, Taiwan, Thailand, Uganda, the United Arab Emirates and the United States.

Many countries also require a photo be taken of people entering the country. The United States, which does not fully implement exit control formalities at its land frontiers (although long mandated by its own legislation), intends to implement facial recognition for passengers departing from international airports to identify people who overstay their visa.

Together with fingerprint and face recognition, iris scanning is one of three biometric identification technologies internationally standardised since 2006 by the International Civil Aviation Organization (ICAO) for use in e-passports and the United Arab Emirates conducts iris scanning on visitors who need to apply for a visa. The United States Department of Homeland Security has announced plans to greatly increase the biometric data it collects at US borders. In 2018, Singapore began trials of iris scanning at three land and maritime immigration checkpoints.

== See also ==
- Visa policy of Bolivia
- Bolivian passport
