= Bolivian nationality law =

Bolivian nationality law is regulated by the 2009 Constitution. This statute determines who is, or is eligible to be, a citizen of Bolivia. The legal means to acquire nationality and formal membership in a nation differ from the relationship of rights and obligations between a national and the nation, known as citizenship. Bolivian nationality is typically obtained either on the principle of jus soli, i.e. by birth in Bolivia; or under the rules of jus sanguinis, i.e. by birth abroad to at least one parent with Bolivian nationality. It can also be granted to a permanent resident who has lived in Bolivia for a given period of time through naturalization.

== Acquiring Bolivian nationality ==
Bolivians may acquire nationality through birth or naturalization. The current nationality regulations are silent on how one may re-acquire Bolivian nationality if it was previously lost.

=== By birthright ===
- Those born within the territory of Bolivia, except children born to foreign diplomats.
- Those born abroad to Bolivian parents, who have been formally registered by diplomatic or consular officials in the Civil Birth Registry for Bolivia.

=== By naturalization ===
Naturalization requires that a foreigner make an explicit and voluntary statement that they want to acquire Bolivian nationality. They are required to comply with the procedures contained in the "Migration Law of 8 May 2013 and its Supreme Decree No. 1923 of 13 March 2014". Applications are processed by the General Directorate of Migration and naturalization is bestowed by resolution of the President of Bolivia. Requirements of eligibility include:

- Foreigners with uninterrupted residency of at least three years; or
- Persons married to Bolivians, those who have Bolivian children, those who were adopted as children by Bolivian parents, or those who have provided military or legislative service to the country and who have had legal residence in the country for a minimum of two years.

== Loss of Bolivian nationality ==
The 2009 Constitution has no language pertaining to how one loses nationality. It states that nationality cannot be lost through marriage to a foreigner or obtaining another nationality.

== Dual nationality ==
The Supreme Decree 27698, issued on 24 August 2004, established that dual nationality is acceptable in Bolivia.

== History ==
The independent Bolivian Republic was proclaimed in 1825 and the founding Constitution of 1826 abolished slavery, granting nationality, but not citizenship to former slaves. It defined as Bolivians, those born in the territory. Its first civil code, known as the Código Santa Cruz (Santa Cruz Code), was structured on a literal translation of the Civil Code of France, rather than being based on Spanish civil laws. Enacted in 1830, it provided that a wife must obey her husband, live where he chose to reside, and had no protection under the law from domestic violence. Upon marriage, regardless of whether the husband's country granted his wife nationality, a woman lost her Bolivian nationality. Married women could not independently nationalize or relinquish their nationality. Under no circumstances could a Bolivian woman convey derivative nationality upon her husband. If a woman had lost her nationality because of marriage, she could repatriate only if her husband died, she had established residence in Bolivia, and she declared her intent to reestablish herself as a Bolivian national.

Foreign women marrying Bolivian nationals automatically derived Bolivian nationality and a foreign man's choice to naturalize as a Bolivian, automatically changed his wife's nationality. Under no circumstances did marriage affect a Bolivian man's nationality. A widow of a Bolivian national retained her derivative nationality unless she chose to regain her former nationality or left the country. If a Bolivian man chose to relinquish his nationality, his wife in all cases automatically gave up her nationality. If he then chose to take his children from the country, and acquired new nationality, the children's nationality would change to his new allegiance. Married women were prohibited from changing their children's nationality. The Constitution of 1831, repeated birth in the territory as the basis of nationality, but allowed foreigners to obtain a nationality card after three years of residency. Birthright nationality was expanded under the Constitution of 1839 to include children born to foreign parents, as long as they were enrolled in the civil registry by the time they reached majority, and to children born abroad to Bolivian fathers who were in service to the government. It also allowed foreigners to acquire nationality by simply renouncing their former allegiance and enrolling in the Bolivian civil registry.

The constitutions of 1843, 1851, and 1861, did not address the nationality scheme; however the 1861 constitution allowed children born abroad to Bolivian parents, regardless of whether they were birthright nationals or naturalized, to derive nationality. The Fundamental Law of 1861 (Ley Fundamental de 1861), provided that only illegitimate children born abroad to Bolivian mothers were birthright nationals, as women married to foreigners were not Bolivian. According to the Bolivian Constitution of 1880, as amended in 1931, a child born in Bolivia had Bolivian nationality regardless of the nationality of its parents. A child born abroad to a Bolivian father, whether legitimate or legitimized, could derive its father's nationality by establishing residence in Bolivia. Children born abroad to fathers or mothers working in the service of the government had Bolivian nationality. The legitimate or legitimized child of a woman who had lost her nationality because of marriage to a foreigner could derive Bolivian nationality from her only if its father died, its mother repatriated, and it established a residence in Bolivia. Illegitimate children who were legally recognized by a parent and living in Bolivia had Bolivian nationality; however, if the father recognized the child first, or simultaneously recognized the child with the mother, the child was required to have the same nationality as its father.

In 1933, Arturo Pinto Escalier, Bolivia's delegate to the Pan-American Union's Montevideo conference, signed the Inter-American Convention on the Nationality of Women without legal reservations. The treaty was ratified the following year and entered into force on 29 August 1934. In 1936, the government amended the civil code with a decree on the civil rights of women, which negated by Article 2, the loss of nationality because of marriage. Subsequently, in 1938, the Bolivian Constitution was modified providing in Section 4, Article 39, that children born in Bolivia were birthright nationals and those born abroad to Bolivian parents were recognized as birthright nationals, if they resided in the country. Article 41 of the same section provided that Bolivian women married to a foreigner retained their nationality and foreign women married to Bolivian men automatically derived Bolivian nationality. Loss of nationality could occur by serving in an enemy army in time of war, or obtaining citizenship in another nation. From the adoption of the Constitution of 1947, foreign men who married Bolivian women could naturalize with residence of only one year. As of 1967, the only remaining provision for loss of Bolivian nationality was if a national took dual citizenship but this was negated by reforms in 2004. The civil code of 1830 remained in place until 1976, when it was finally modified into new civil and family codes.
