= Visa policy of Bolivia =

Policy on permits required to enter Bolivia

Visitors to Bolivia must obtain a visa from one of the Bolivian diplomatic missions unless they are citizens of one of the visa-exempt countries.

There are 3 groups of countries: countries whose citizens do not require a visa (Group 1), countries whose citizens must obtain a visa in advance (Group 2), and countries whose citizens must obtain visa in advance with a special authorization (Group 3).

== Visa policy map ==
Visa policy of Bolivia Bolivia Visa not required - may enter with an ID card (90 days) Visa not required (180 days) Visa not required (90 days) Visa required Visa required with a special authorization

== Group 1 countries: Visa exemption ==
=== Ordinary passports ===
Citizens of the following countries and territories may enter Bolivia without a visa for the following period:

180 days

- Mexico

90 days

- Dominican Republic
- Honduras
- Palestine
- United Kingdom (Note: Including all types of British passports.)

90 days within any 180 days

- Russia

90 days within a year

- European Union member states (except Cyprus)

- Andorra
- Argentina^{ID}
- Australia
- Brazil^{ID}
- Canada
- Chile^{ID}
- Colombia^{ID}
- Costa Rica
- Ecuador^{ID}
- El Salvador
- Iceland
- Israel
- Japan
- Liechtenstein
- Monaco
- New Zealand
- Norway
- Panama
- Paraguay^{ID}
- Peru^{ID}
- Philippines
- South Africa
- South Korea
- Suriname
- Switzerland
- Turkey
- United Arab Emirates
- United States
- Uruguay^{ID}
- Vatican City
- Venezuela^{ID}

_{ID ‒ May enter with an ID card in lieu of a passport.}

Date of visa changes
- 1 October 1961: Belgium, Netherlands
- 26 April 1962: Spain
- 1 February 1963: Philippines
- 1 January 1986: Finland
- 28 December 1995: Brazil
- 3 October 2016: Russia
- 2 September 2024: Dominican Republic
- 1 December 2025: Bulgaria, Israel, Malta, Romania, South Africa, South Korea, United Arab Emirates, United States

Cancelled:

- 8 February 2021: Israel and United States, United States moved to group 2, Israel moved to group 3.

=== Non-ordinary passports ===
Holders of diplomatic or official/service passports of any country except China may enter Bolivia without a visa for up to 90 days.

Holders of diplomatic or service passports and passports for public affairs issued by China may enter Bolivia without a visa for up to 30 days.

== Group 2 countries: Visa required in advance ==
Citizens of countries in Group 2 must obtain a visa prior to arrival, obtained at any Bolivian embassy or consulate.

In the past, citizens of Group 2 countries could obtain a visa on arrival. The information is no longer listed on Timatic, and the South Korean diplomatic mission in Bolivia stated that it has ended on the 25th of July 2025..

== Group 3 countries: Special authorization required ==
Citizens of the following countries are required to obtain a further authorization from a Bolivian embassy or consulate:

- Afghanistan
- Angola
- Bhutan
- Cambodia
- Chad
- Congo
- DR Congo
- Indonesia
- Iraq
- Laos
- Libya
- Nigeria
- North Korea
- Pakistan
- Rwanda
- Somalia
- Sudan
- Syria
- Timor-Leste
- Yemen

== Online application via embassy or consulate ==
To simplify the visa application process for citizens who require a visa, Bolivia has introduced an online platform that allows travelers to submit their personal information, supporting documents, and payment electronically. However, the platform currently serves primarily as an application portal rather than a fully digital visa process.

Visa applications are still processed by Bolivian embassies or consulates. Applicants must contact the relevant embassy or consulate to submit any additional required documents and their passport in order to obtain the visa sticker. In some cases, an interview may also be required. Some embassies and consulates do not require this online application process.

== Visitor statistics ==
Most visitors arriving in Bolivia were from the following countries of nationality:

Country	2016	2015	2014
Argentina	293,458	238,141	242,075
Peru	271,046	293,466	314,119
Chile	104,463	102,624	116,664
Brazil	86,487	96,205	101,890
United States	58,403	59,129	59,871
Spain	37,626	34,066	33,967
France	33,990	32,620	33,403
Germany	30,238	34,159	30,182
Colombia	29,575	24,314	25,560
Paraguay	19,743	17,585	18,196
Total	1,177,455	1,131,441	1,180,450

== Notes ==
- Visa requirements for Bolivian citizens
- Tourism in Bolivia
