= 2024 =

Calendar year

2024 in various calendars
- Gregorian calendar: 2024; MMXXIV
- Ab urbe condita: 2777
- Armenian calendar: 1473; ԹՎ ՌՆՀԳ
- Assyrian calendar: 6774
- Baháʼí calendar: 180–181
- Balinese saka calendar: 1945–1946
- Bengali calendar: 1430–1431
- Berber calendar: 2974
- British Regnal year: 2 Cha. 3 – 3 Cha. 3
- Buddhist calendar: 2568
- Burmese calendar: 1386
- Byzantine calendar: 7532–7533
- Chinese calendar: 癸卯年 (Water Rabbit); 4721 or 4514 — to — 甲辰年 (Wood Dragon); 4722 or 4515
- Coptic calendar: 1740–1741
- Discordian calendar: 3190
- Ethiopian calendar: 2016–2017
- Hebrew calendar: 5784–5785
- Hindu calendars
- Vikram Samvat: 2080–2081
- Shaka Samvat: 1945–1946
- Kali Yuga: 5124–5125
- Holocene calendar: 12024
- Igbo calendar: 1024–1025
- Iranian calendar: 1402–1403
- Islamic calendar: 1445–1446
- Japanese calendar: Reiwa 6 (令和６年)
- Javanese calendar: 1957–1958
- Juche calendar: 113
- Julian calendar: Gregorian minus 13 days
- Korean calendar: 4357
- Minguo calendar: ROC 113 民國113年
- Nanakshahi calendar: 556
- Thai solar calendar: 2567
- Tibetan calendar: ཆུ་མོ་ཡོས་ལོ་ (female Water-Hare); 2150 or 1769 or 997 — to — ཤིང་ཕོ་འབྲུག་ལོ་ (male Wood-Dragon); 2151 or 1770 or 998
- Unix time: 1704067200 – 1735689599

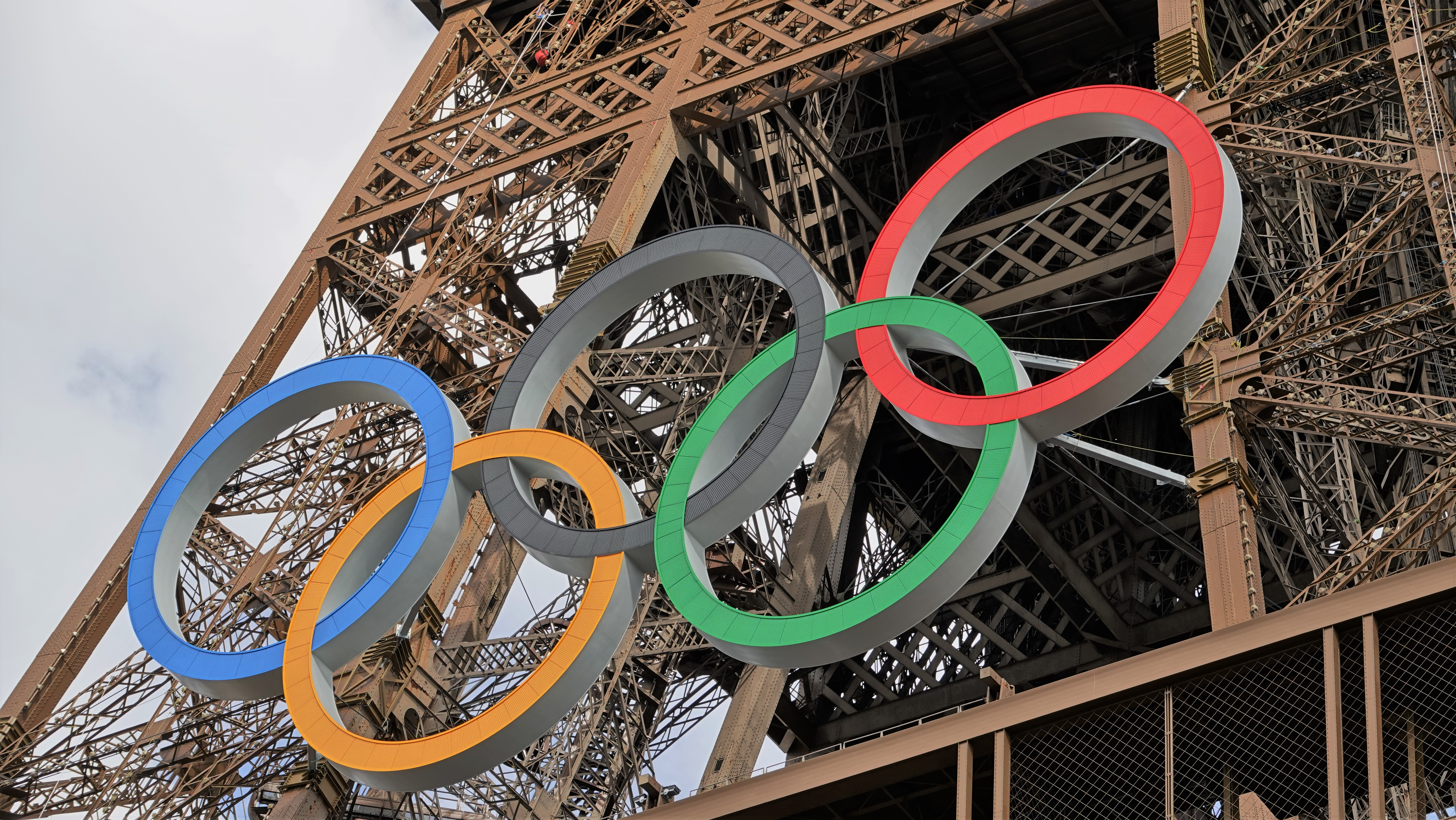
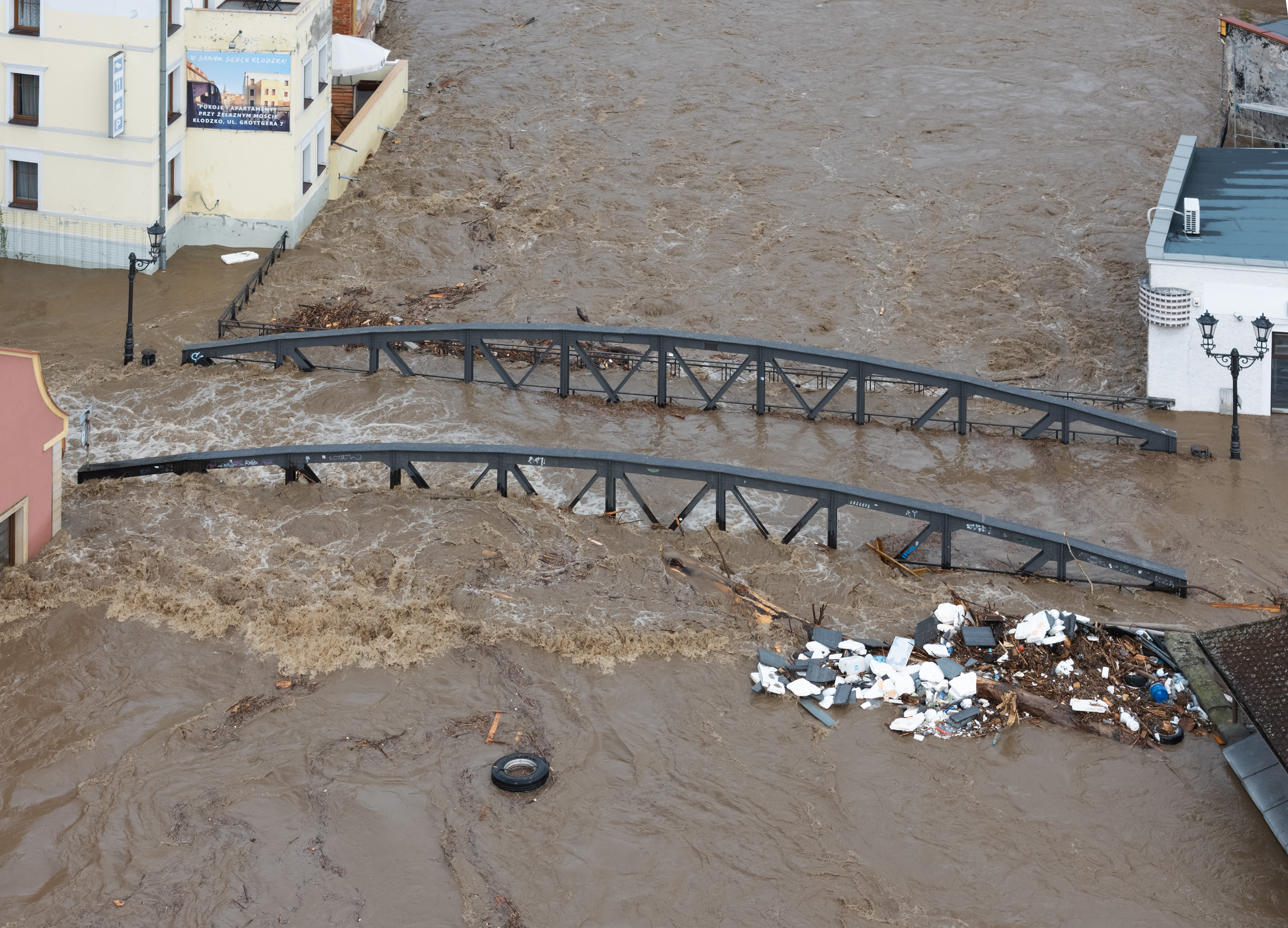
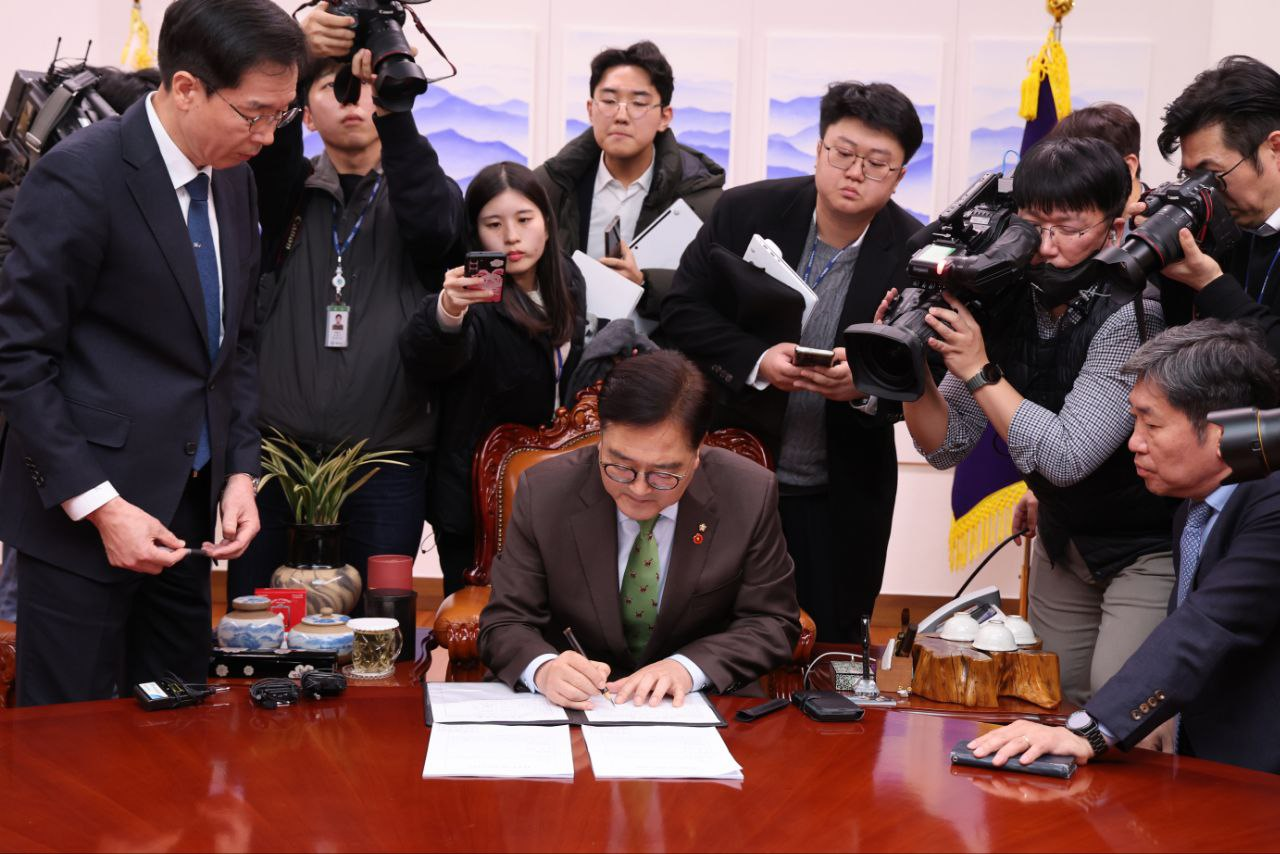
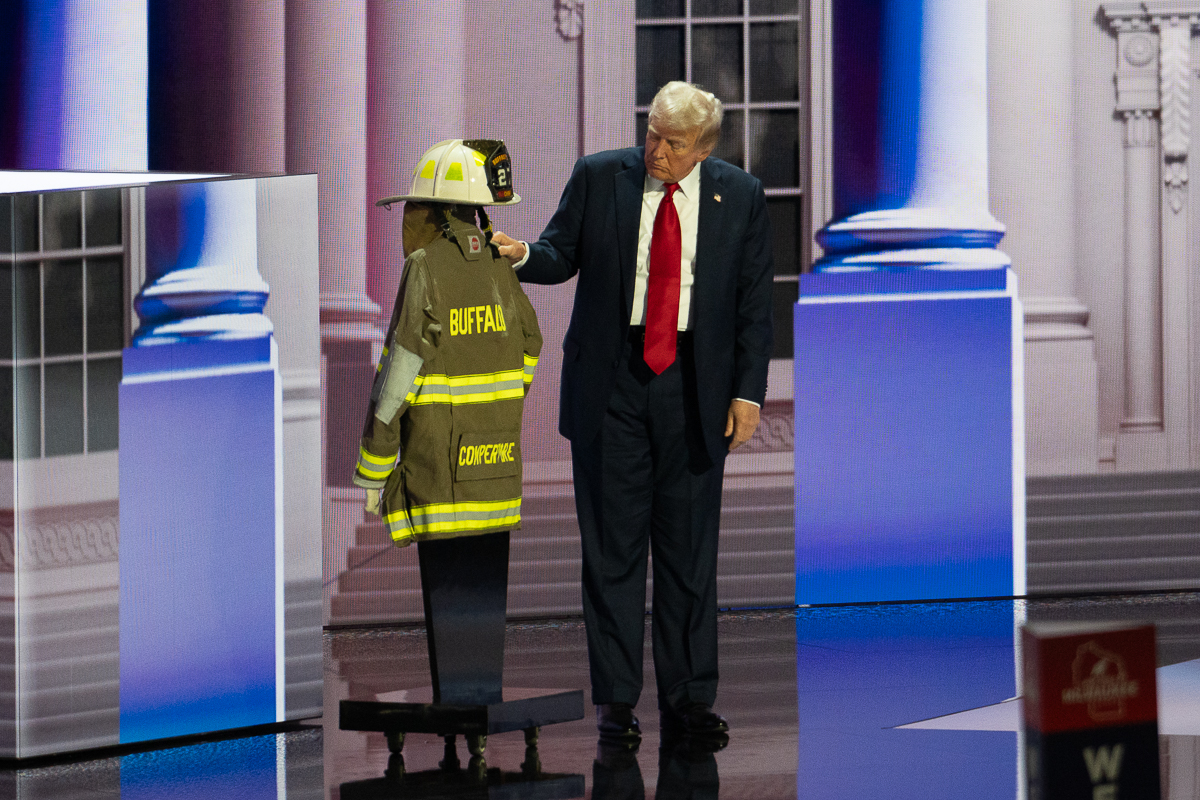
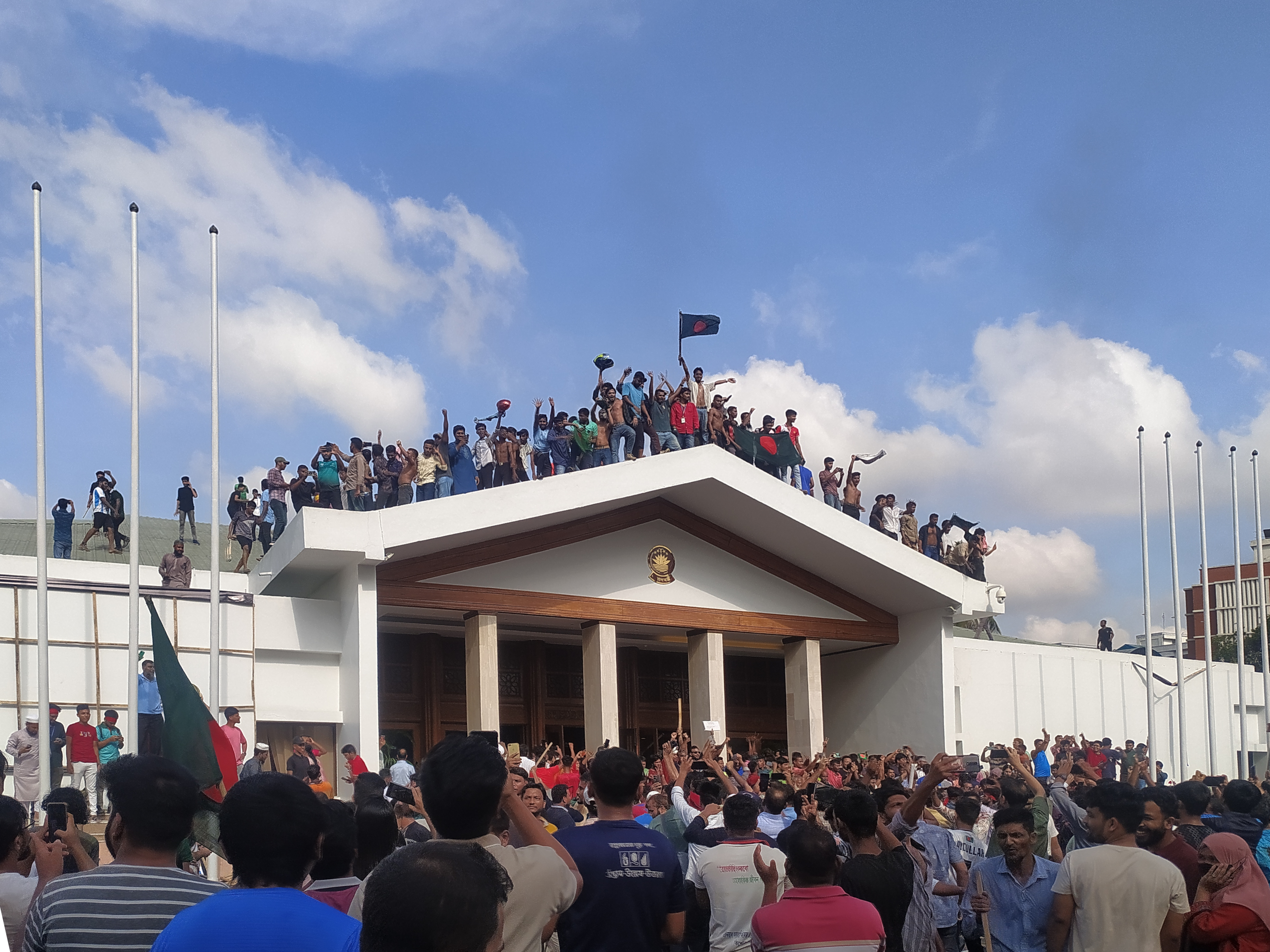
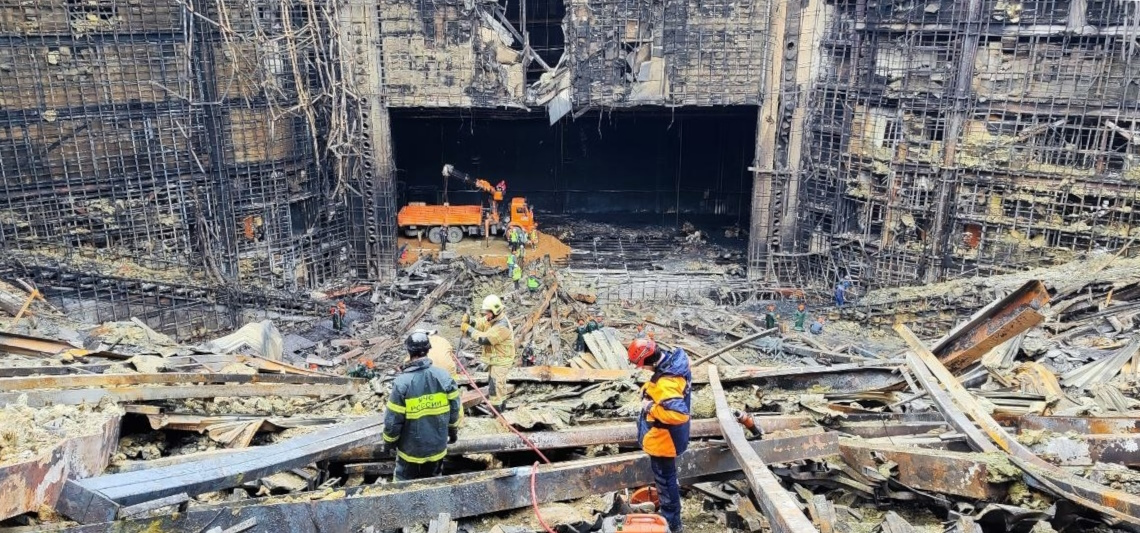
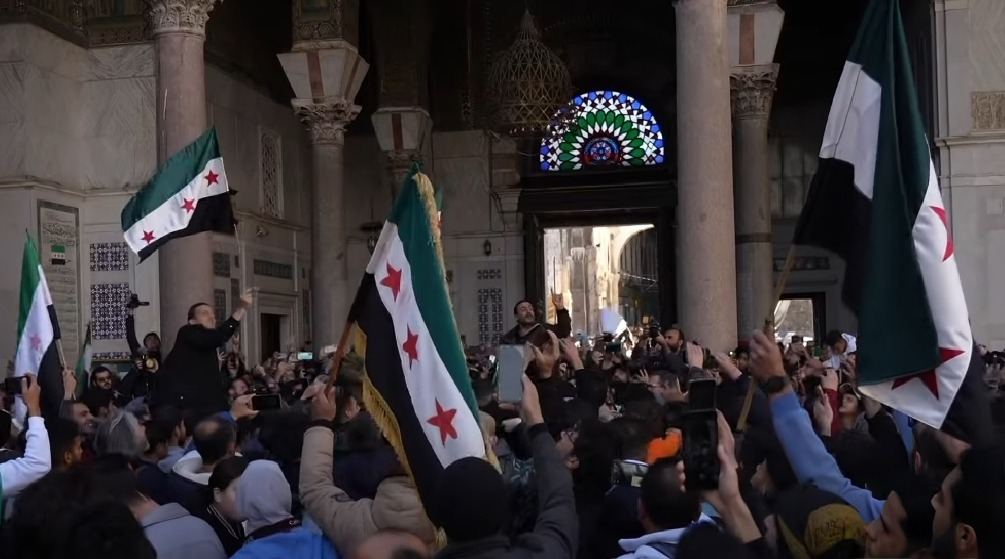
From left to right, top to bottom:
- The 2024 Summer Olympics are held in Paris, France;
- Flooded bridge in Kłodzko, Poland, as part of the European floods, which left at least 337 people dead;
- Speaker of the National Assembly Woo Won-shik signing the resolution to impeach South Korean president Yoon Suk Yeol following the latter's declaration of martial law;
- Iranian supreme leader Ali Khamenei leading the funeral prayer for Ismail Haniyeh, the political leader of Hamas, who was assassinated in Tehran by an Israeli attack;
- Donald Trump, winner of the U.S. presidential election, pays respect to Corey Comperatore, who was killed in an assassination attempt on Trump;
- People cheering after the resignation of Bangladeshi prime minister Sheikh Hasina, ending the first ever successful Gen Z revolution;
- Krasnogorsk's Crocus City Hall music venue after a terrorist attack that killed 151 people and injured 609, the deadliest in Russia since the Beslan school siege in 2004;
- Syrians celebrate the fall of the President Bashar al-Assad's regime at the Umayyad Mosque in Damascus.

2024 (MMXXIV) was a leap year starting on Monday of the Gregorian calendar, the 2024th year of the Common Era (CE) and Anno Domini (AD) designations, the 24th year of the 3rd millennium and the 21st century, and the 5th year of the 2020s decade.

The year saw the continuation of major armed conflicts, including the Russo-Ukrainian war, the Myanmar civil war, the Sudanese civil war, and the Islamist insurgency in the Sahel. The Gaza war led to widespread protests and spillover conflicts into numerous other countries, most notably Lebanon, which was invaded by Israel in October. This followed an intensification of the ongoing conflict between Israel and Hezbollah. In September, Israel escalated an offensive against the group, which resulted in the killing of the Secretary-General, Hassan Nasrallah. Ismail Haniyeh, the political leader of Hamas, had also been assassinated in Iranian capital Tehran in July, and his successor Yahya Sinwar was killed by the Israel Defense Forces in October. In November, heavy fighting resumed in the Syrian civil war, leading to the toppling of Ba'athist Syria, with Bashar al-Assad fleeing Syria in December. The year also saw a rise in activity by the Houthi movement which contributed to a crisis in the Red Sea that impacted global shipping.

Approximately 80 countries, representing around 4 billion people, conducted national elections throughout the course of the year, including eight out of the ten most populous countries (Bangladesh, Brazil, Pakistan, Russia, India, Mexico, Indonesia, and the United States) as well as France, the United Kingdom, and Japan. The European Parliament also held elections. Among democracies, over 80% saw the incumbent party lose support compared to the last election, including many significant losses. In countries like Japan, Botswana, and South Africa, incumbent parties that had dominated domestic politics for decades lost their majorities and either relinquished power or are holding on through coalitions with minor parties. Bassirou Diomaye Faye won the 2024 Senegalese presidential election, becoming the first opposition candidate to win in the first round since the country's independence. In Sri Lanka, voters delivered a landslide victory to the National People's Power, previously a minor party. On November 5, 2024, Republican politician Donald Trump won the 2024 United States presidential election, becoming the first U.S. president to be elected to a nonconsecutive second term since 1892. The French and German governments lost votes of no confidence. In December, South Korean president Yoon Suk Yeol's attempt to declare and impose martial law was thwarted by members of parliament, sparking a political crisis that led to his impeachment.

== Events ==
=== January ===
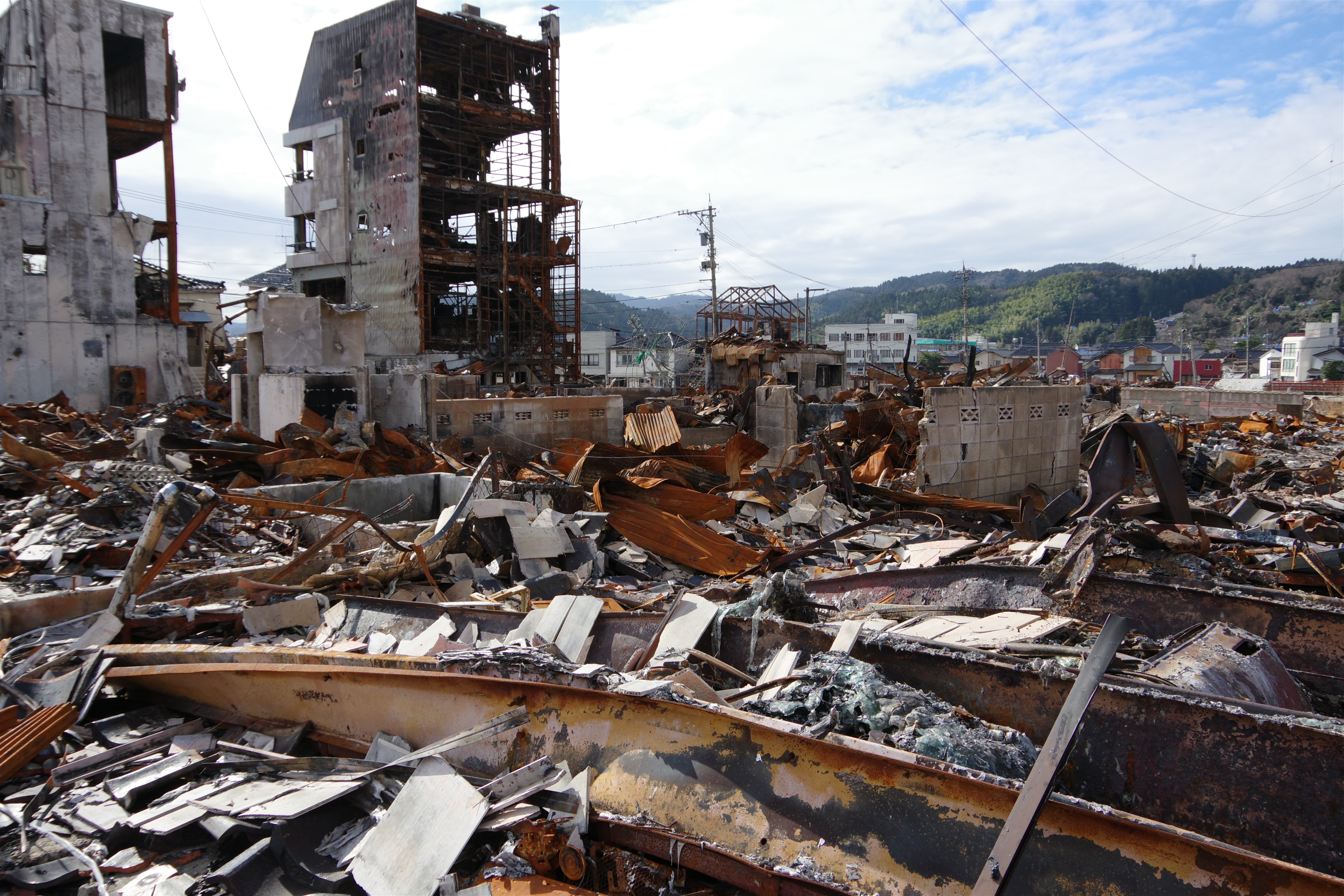
Damage caused by the 7.5 magnitude earthquake and subsequent fires in the city of Wajima, Japan

- January 1
  - Egypt, Ethiopia, Iran and the United Arab Emirates become BRICS members.
  - The Republic of Artsakh is formally dissolved following the recapture of the Nagorno-Karabakh region by Azerbaijan.
  - A 7.5 Mww earthquake strikes the western coast of Japan (Noto Peninsula), killing at least 504 people and injuring 1,389 others. A further 5 are killed the next day when a Coast Guard aircraft carrying humanitarian aid was involved in a collision with a Japan Airlines Airbus A350-900 aircraft, destroying both aircraft. All 379 people aboard the passenger jet are evacuated safely.
  - Ethiopia announces an agreement with Somaliland to use the port of Berbera. Ethiopia also says that it will eventually recognize Somaliland's independence, becoming the first country to do so.
- January 2 – 2023 Marshallese general election: The Legislature of the Marshall Islands elects Hilda Heine as President for a second non-consecutive term during its first session following the general election.
- January 3 – 2024 Kerman bombings: An Islamic State double bombing kills 94 people during a memorial event commemorating the assassination of Qasem Soleimani in Kerman, Iran. The bombing was carried out using two briefcase bombs placed at the entrance that were detonated remotely.
- January 7 – 2024 Bangladeshi general election: The Awami League, led by incumbent Sheikh Hasina, wins a 4th consecutive term amid protests by opposition parties and a large drop in voter turnout.
- January 8
  - Said Abdullahi Deni is elected President of Puntland by the Puntland Parliament after three rounds in the 2024 Punttland presidential election.
  - Ecuadorian conflict (2024–present): Ecuadorian President Daniel Noboa declares a state of emergency following the escape of Los Choneros drug cartel leader José Adolfo Macías Villamar from prison. The military was deployed onto the streets and into prisons, while setting a national nighttime curfew.
- January 11 – Riots break out throughout Papua New Guinea after an alleged rounding error causes pay cuts for police officers and soldiers.
- January 12 – Operation Prosperity Guardian: A U.S.-led coalition launches airstrikes at Houthi militant locations in Yemen, marking a retaliation to the Houthis' attacks on ships in the Red Sea.
- January 13 – 2024 Taiwanese presidential election: Lai Ching-te of the ruling Democratic Progressive Party wins with 40% of the vote.
- January 14
  - Margrethe II formally abdicates as Queen of Denmark on the 52nd anniversary of her accession, with her eldest son Frederik succeeding her as King Frederik X.
  - 2024 Comorian presidential election: Amid an opposition boycott, incumbent president Azali Assoumani wins re-election with 62.9% of the vote and only 16.3% voter turnout.
- January 15 – Following a brief political crisis in the aftermath of the 2023 elections, Bernardo Arévalo is inaugurated as the 52nd President of Guatemala.
- January 16 – Iran carries out a series of missile and drone strikes within Balochistan, Pakistan, claiming that it had targeted the Iranian Baloch militant group Jaish ul-Adl.
- January 18 – Pakistan conducts retaliatory airstrikes on Iran's Sistan and Baluchestan province.
- January 19 – Japan becomes the 5th country to achieve a soft landing on the Moon, with its SLIM mission.
- January 22 – Ram Mandir Pran Pratishtha: The Ram Mandir is inaugurated by Prime Minister, Narendra Modi in Ayodhya, Uttar Pradesh.
- January 24 – 2024 Korochansky Ilyushin Il-76 crash: A Russian Ilyushin Il-76 military transport plane carrying (according to Russia) 65 Ukrainian prisoners of war, 6 crew members, and 3 guards crashes in Russia's Korochansky District, near the Ukrainian border, killing everyone on board.
- January 26
  - Gaza war: The UN's International Court of Justice rules that Israel must take all measures to prevent genocidal acts in Gaza, but stops short of ordering an immediate halt to operations.
  - 2024 Tuvaluan general election: Kausea Natano, the incumbent Prime Minister of Tuvalu, loses reelection to Parliament. A month later, Feleti Teo was elected prime minister.
- January 31 – Sultan of Johor Ibrahim Iskandar ascends the throne as the 17th Yang di-Pertuan Agong of Malaysia.

=== February ===
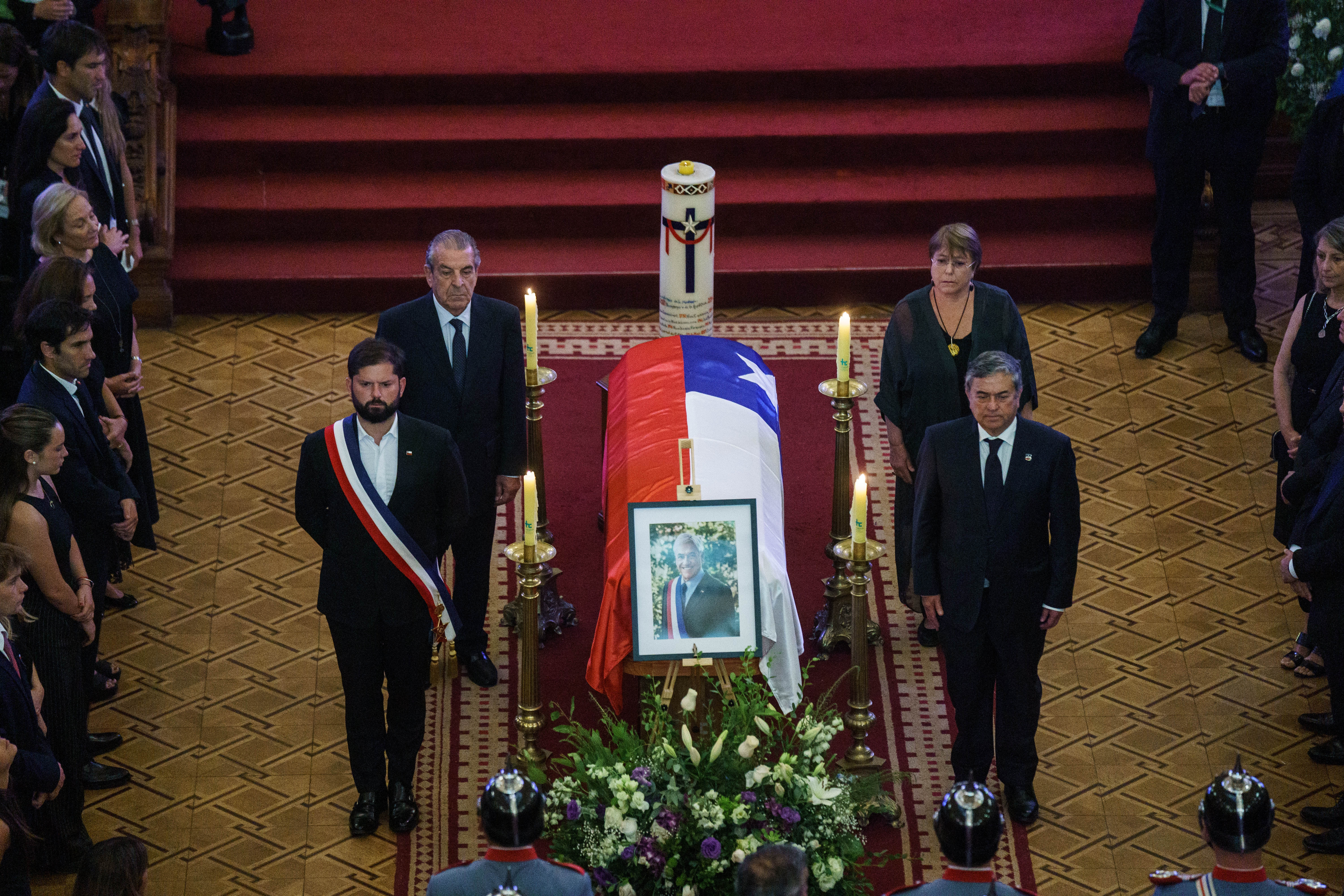
Sebastián Piñera, former President of Chile, died in a helicopter crash on February 6

- February 2 – The US launches airstrikes on 85 targets in Iraq and Syria in response to a deadly drone attack on a US military base.
- February 4
  - President of Namibia Hage Geingob dies at the age of 82, and is succeeded by his vice-president Nangolo Mbumba.
  - 2024 Salvadoran presidential election: Incumbent President Nayib Bukele wins the election with over 80% of the vote, becoming the first president to be reelected in El Salvador since 1944.
- February 6 – Former President of Chile Sebastián Piñera dies in a helicopter crash at the age of 74.
- February 7 – 2024 Azerbaijani presidential election: Amid an opposition boycott, President Ilham Aliyev is reelected to a 5th term.
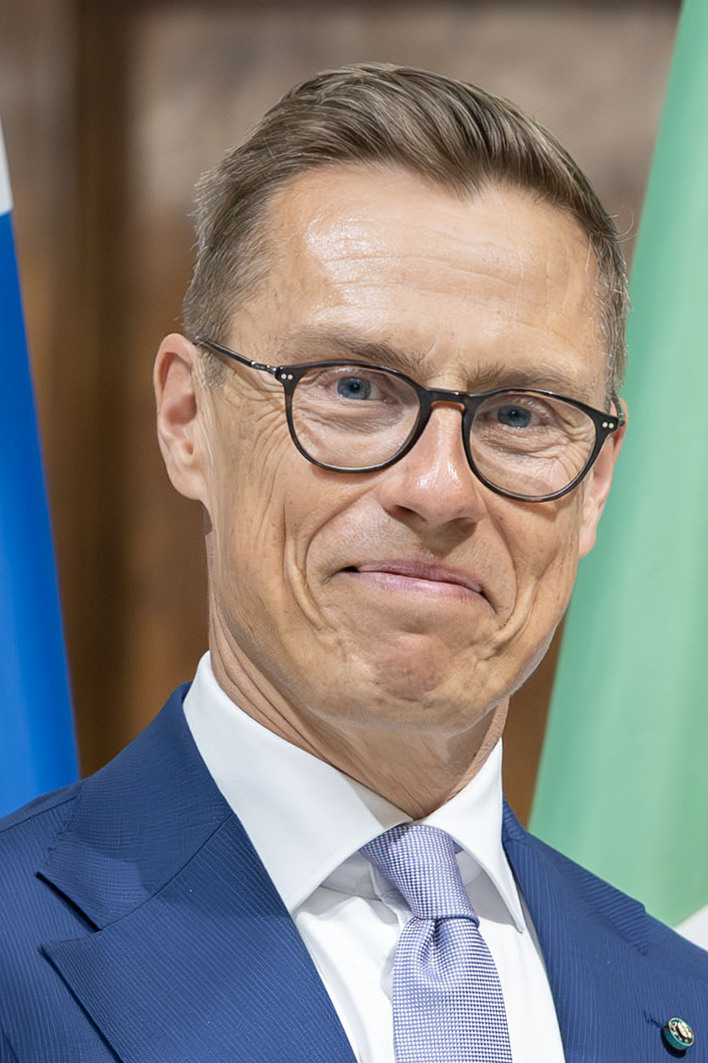
- Alexander Stubb is elected in the closest presidential election in Finnish history on February 11.
  February 8 – 2024 Pakistani general election: Independent politicians, most of whom are members of the banned political party Pakistan Tehreek-e-Insaf, win a plurality of seats in the National Assembly.
- February 11 – 2024 Finnish presidential election: In the closest presidential election in Finnish history, Alexander Stubb is elected president in the second round.
- February 14 – 2024 Indonesian general election: Prabowo Subianto wins the presidential election, and the Democratic Party of Struggle wins the most votes in the legislative election.
- February 16 – Alexei Navalny, a Russian opposition leader, dies under mysterious circumstances at the age of 47.
- February 22 – American company Intuitive Machines' Nova-C lander becomes the first commercial vehicle to land on the Moon.
- February 28 – 2024 Haitian jailbreak: A state of emergency is declared by the Haitian government after gangs storm two prisons and demand the resignation of acting Prime Minister Ariel Henry.
- February 29 – Gaza war: Soldiers of the Israel Defense Forces open fire on a crowd of civilians in Gaza City, killing more than 100 people, as the Palestinian casualties of the war exceed 30,000.

=== March ===
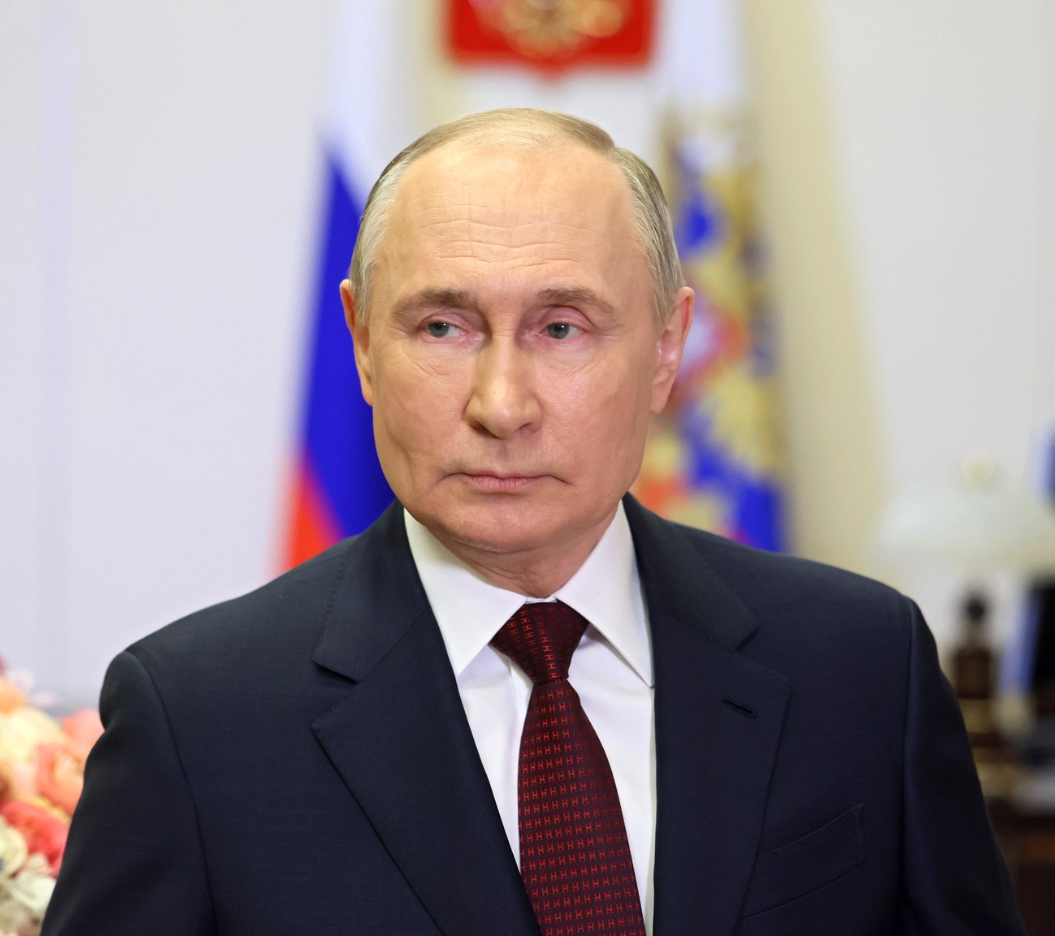
Vladimir Putin was re-elected in the 2024 Russian presidential election, held from March 15 to 17.

- March 7 – As the final Nordic country to join the alliance, Sweden officially joins NATO, becoming its 32nd member after Finland a year earlier.
- March 10 – 2024 Portuguese legislative election: The Democratic Alliance wins a plurality of seats and forms a minority government amid losses by the incumbent Socialist Party and major gains by the right-wing Chega party.
- March 11 – Haitian acting Prime Minister Ariel Henry announces his pending resignation from both offices amid an ongoing crisis marked by gang warfare in the country.
- March 13 – The Artificial Intelligence Act, the world's first comprehensive legal and regulatory framework for artificial intelligence, is passed by the European Union.
- March 14 – The United Nations estimates that at least 56% of Palestinian civilians killed in the Gaza war were women and children.
- March 15–17 – 2024 Russian presidential election: Incumbent Vladimir Putin is reelected for a fifth term.
- March 22 – Islamic State-affiliated gunmen attack concertgoers at Crocus City Hall in Krasnogorsk, Russia, killing at least 151 people and injuring 609.
- March 24 – 2024 Senegalese presidential election: Bassirou Diomaye Faye is elected president after his party and its former candidate Ousmane Sonko were disqualified.
- March 25 – The UN Security Council passes a resolution calling for an "immediate ceasefire" in the Gaza war and demanding the immediate and unconditional release of all hostages.

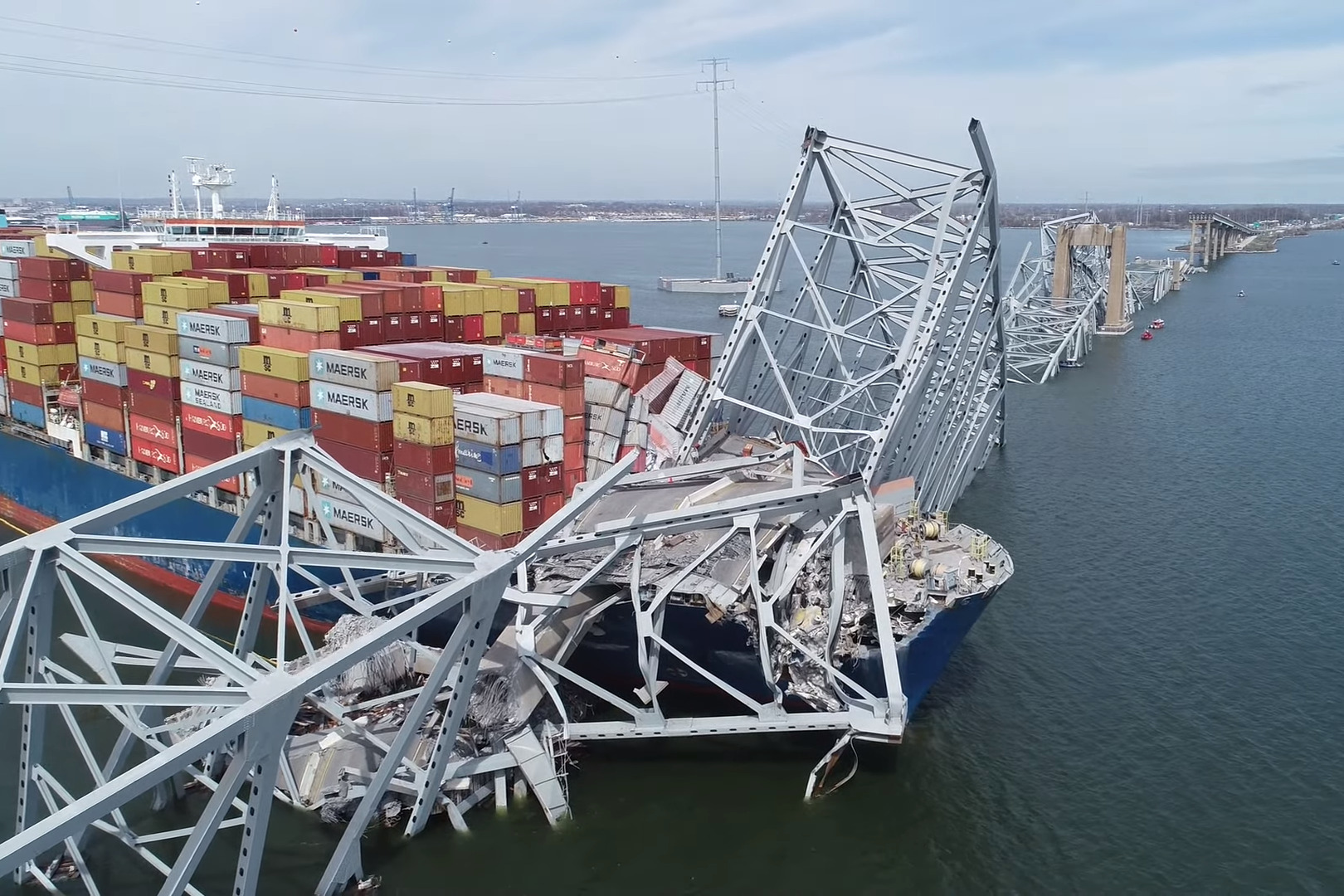
MV Dali under collapsed segments of the Francis Scott Key Bridge on March 26 in Baltimore, Maryland, United States

- March 26 – A container ship collides with the Francis Scott Key Bridge in Baltimore, Maryland, United States, causing a total collapse of the bridge and the deaths of six people.
- March 31 – Bulgaria and Romania become members of the Schengen Area through sea and air routes.

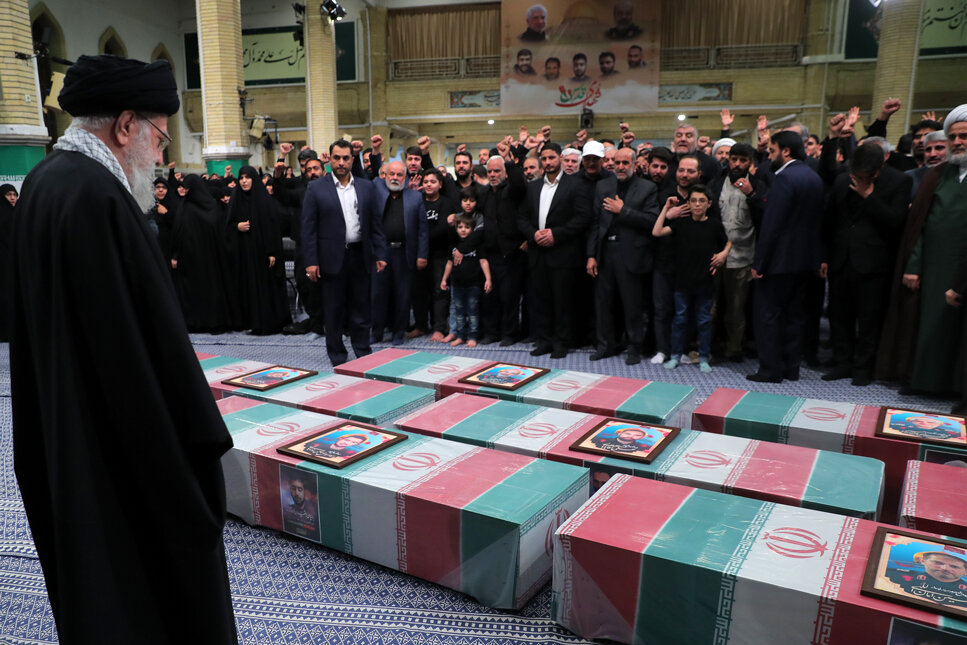
Sixteen people were killed in an Israeli attack in Damascus on April 1

=== April ===
- April 1 – Israel attacks the Iranian embassy in Damascus, killing 16 people.
- April 3 – A powerful earthquake with a magnitude of 7.4 strikes off the eastern coast of Taiwan, with small tsunamis reaching heights of 20–30 cm (8–12 in) hitting Okinawa Prefecture, Japan.
- April 4 – 2024 Kuwaiti general election: Opposition candidates maintain a majority in the National Assembly.
- April 5 – Ecuadorian police raid the Mexican embassy in Quito in order to arrest former vice-president Jorge Glas, who had been granted political asylum by Mexico. This action violates the Vienna Convention on Diplomatic Relations, and Mexico and Nicaragua break off diplomatic relations with Ecuador.

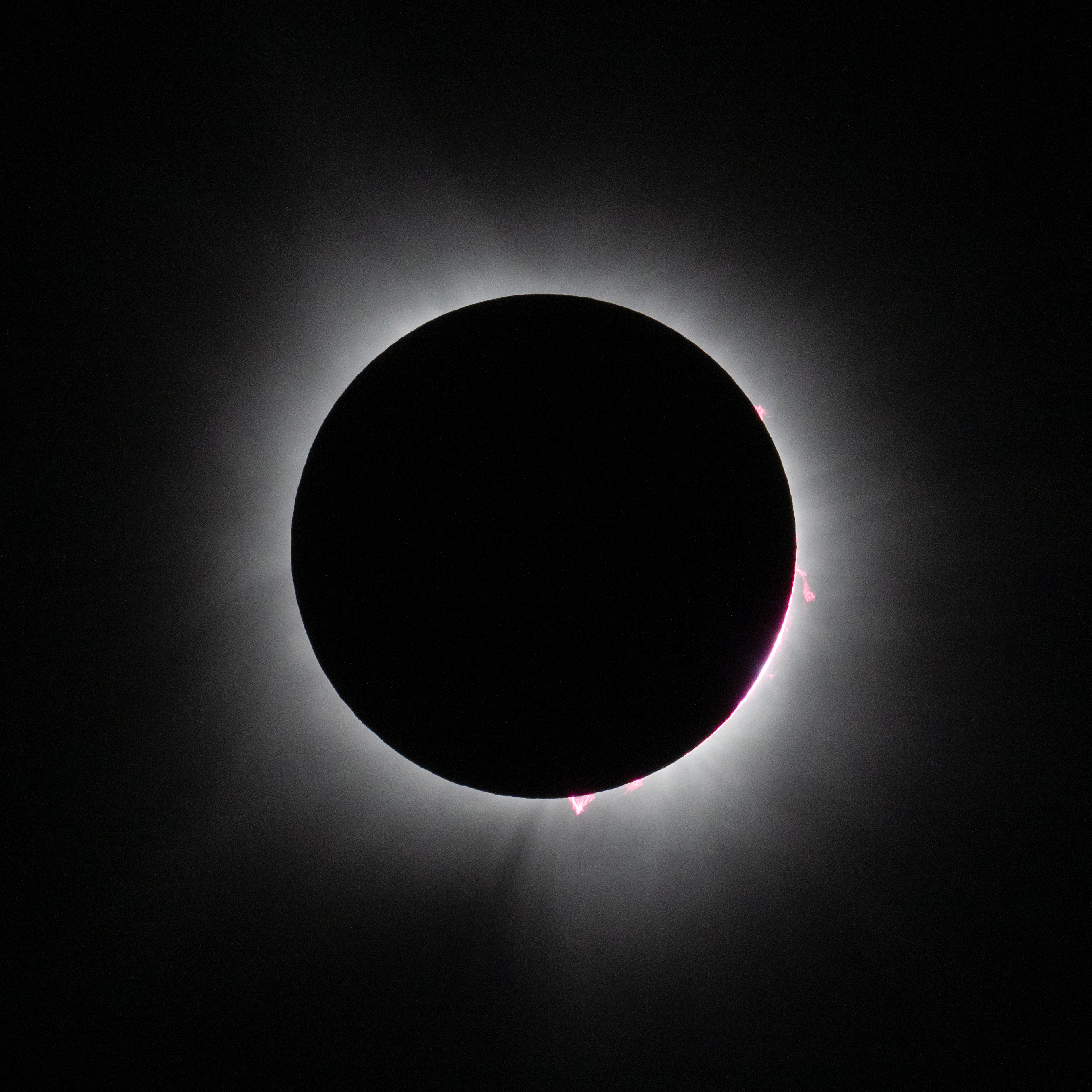
The solar eclipse of April 8, 2024 is visible across North America.

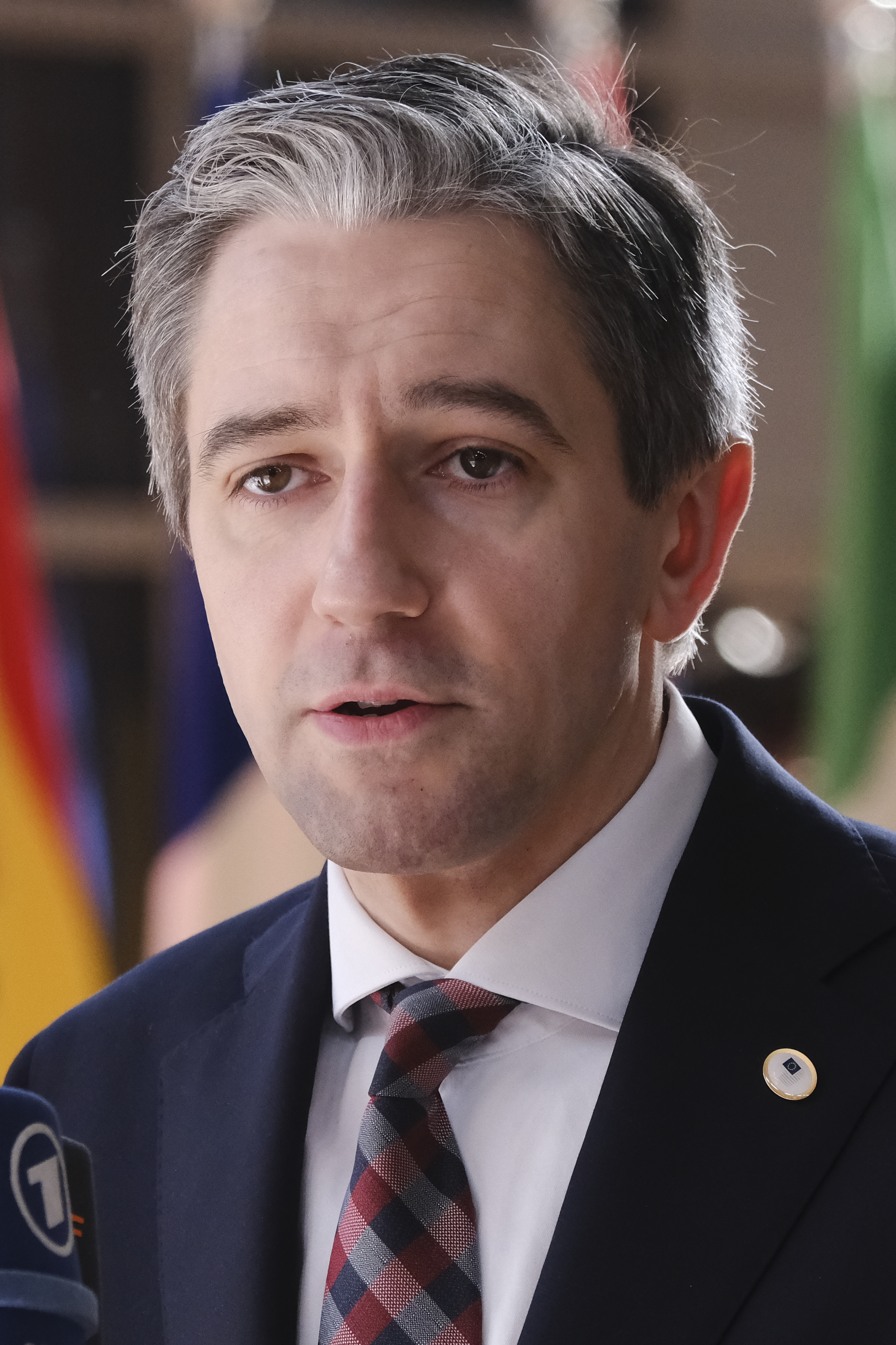
Simon Harris becomes Ireland's youngest Taoiseach on April 9 after Leo Varadkar resigned

- April 6 – Peter Pellegrini is elected President of Slovakia in the second round of the 2024 Slovak presidential election.
- April 8 – A total solar eclipse is visible across North America.
- April 9 – Following Leo Varadkar's resignation, Fine Gael leader Simon Harris becomes Ireland's youngest Taoiseach after a Dáil vote of 88–69 and appointment by President Michael D. Higgins.
- April 10 – 2024 South Korean legislative election: The Democratic Party and Democratic Alliance wins 176 seats, while the People Power and People Future, to which President Yoon Suk Yeol belongs, wins only 108 seats.
- April 13 – Iran launches retaliatory strikes against Israel after an Israeli airstrike on the Iranian consulate in Damascus earlier in the month.

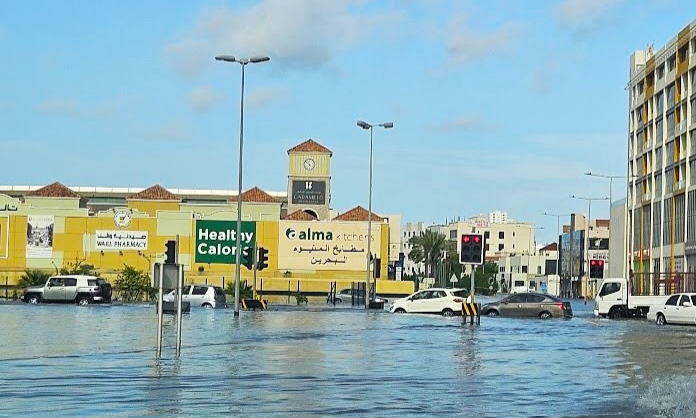
Persian Gulf floods as seen in Manama, Bahrain, on April 16

- April 16 – 2024 Persian Gulf floods: At least 32 people are killed when heavy rainfall strikes the Middle East, causing flash flooding. This caused many disruptions for the airline Emirates at Dubai International Airport.

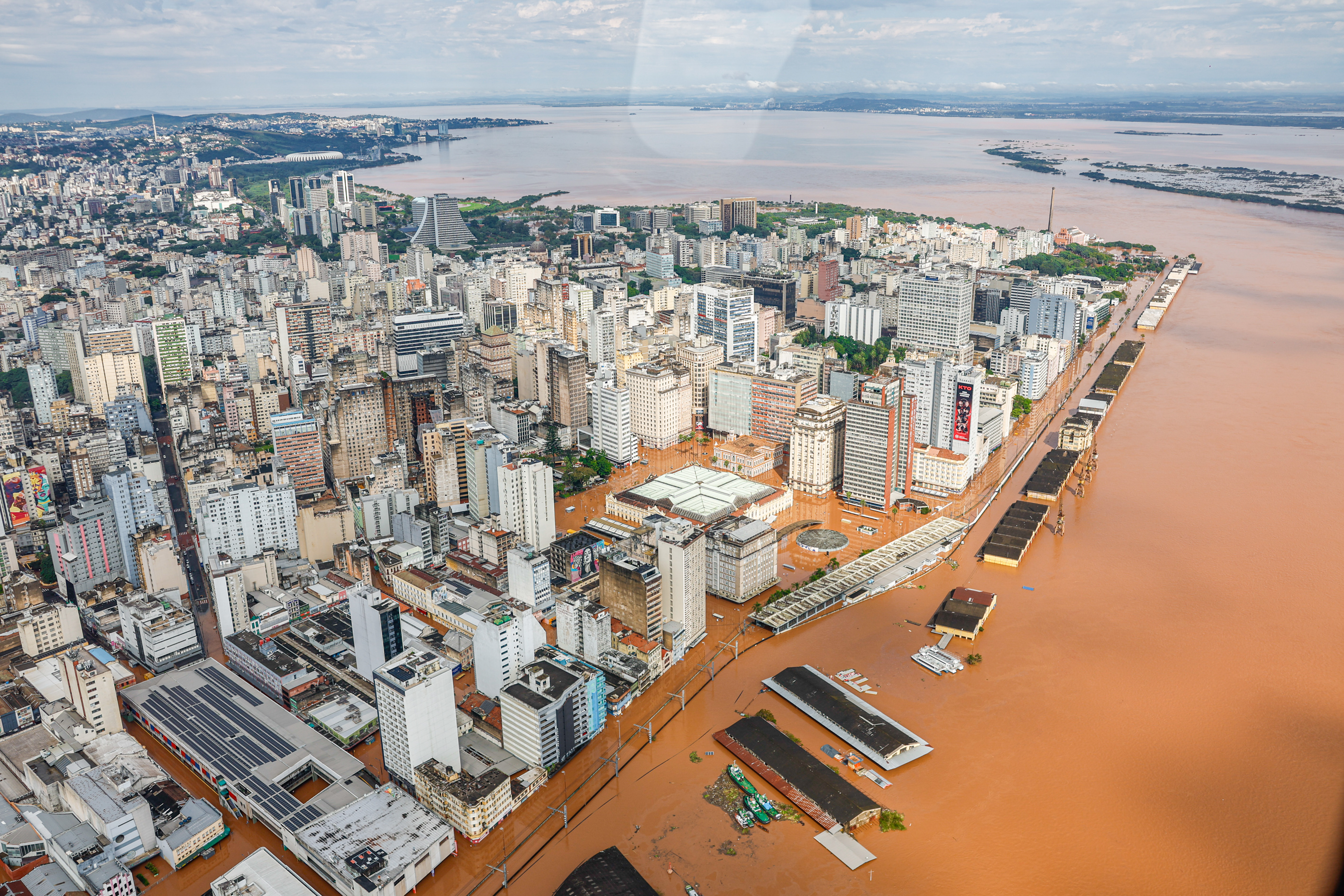
Aerial photographs of the Rio Grande do Sul floods in Porto Alegre, Brazil, on May 5

- April 17
  - 2024 Solomon Islands general election: Incumbent Prime Minister Manasseh Sogavare's OUR Party wins a plurality of seats.
  - 2024 Croatian parliamentary election: Incumbent Prime Minister Andrej Plenković's Croatian Democratic Union coalition wins a plurality of seats.
  - Gaza war protests at universities escalate across the globe and allege Israel is committing genocide.
- April 19 – Israel conducts airstrikes against Iran, in response to Iran's missile and drone attack on Israel earlier on April 13.
- April 25 – Following the resignation of Haiti's acting Prime Minister Ariel Henry, the Transitional Presidential Council takes power as the new head of state of Haiti.
- April 29
  - Floods in the Brazilian state of Rio Grande do Sul cause dozens of deaths and leave thousands homeless.
  - 50 people are killed, and 84 are reported missing, when a railway embankment fails near Mai Mahiu, Kenya, adding to the devastation caused by wider floods in Kenya and Tanzania which have caused the deaths of 488 people and the displacement of 503,000.
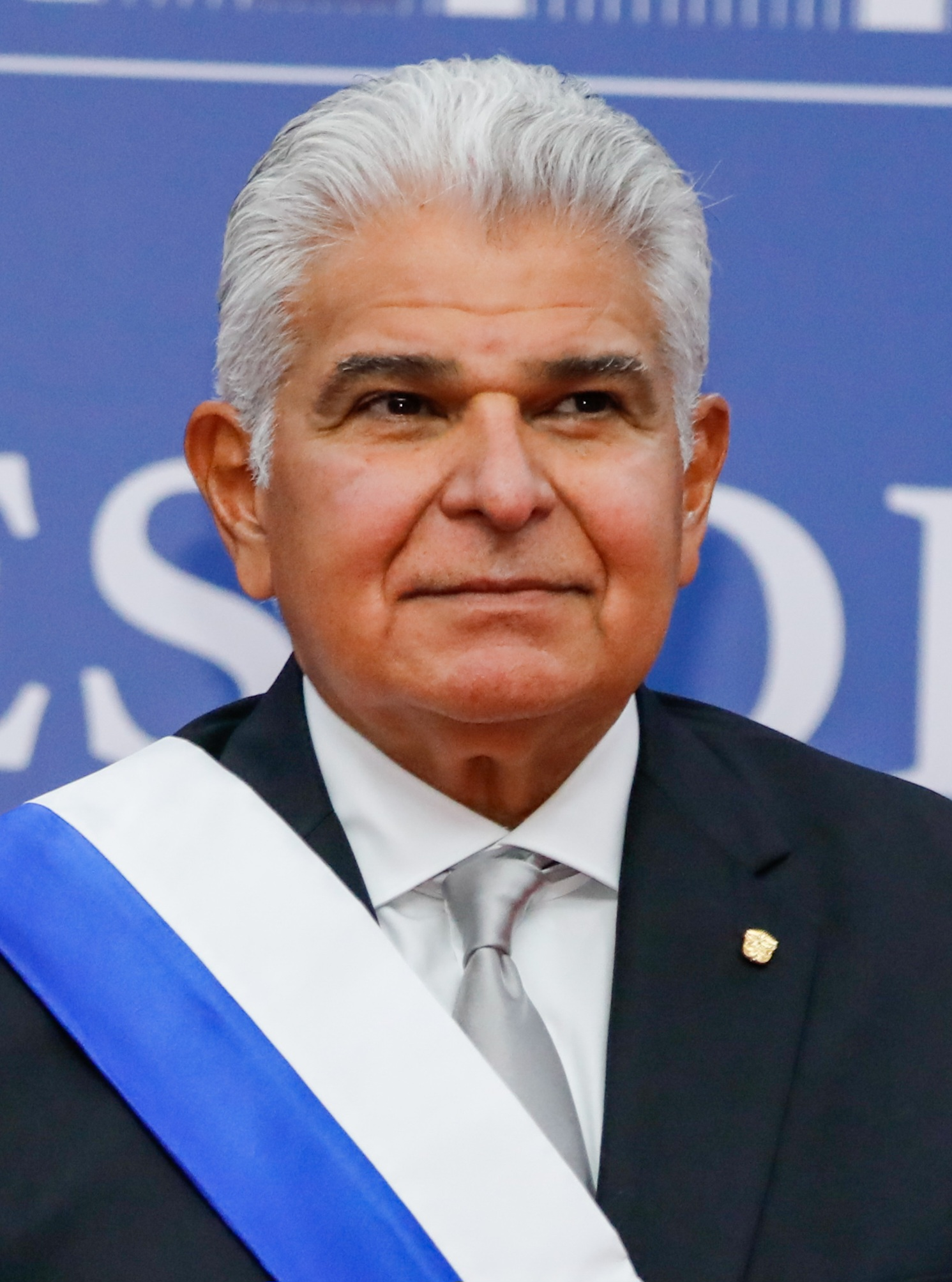
    José Raúl Mulino wins the 2024 Panamanian general election on May 5
- April 30 – The G7 countries agree to phase out unabated coal power by 2030–2035.

=== May ===
- May 5 – 2024 Panamanian general election: José Raúl Mulino is elected president.
- May 6 – 2024 Chadian presidential election: Mahamat Déby wins election to a full term as president, succeeding his father Idriss Déby.
- May 7–11 – The Eurovision Song Contest 2024 is held in Malmö, Sweden. Swiss contestant Nemo wins with the song "The Code".
- May 8 – In North Macedonian elections, the right-wing party VMRO-DPMNE wins in a landslide in the parliamentary elections, while its presidential candidate Gordana Siljanovska-Davkova is elected as the first female president of the country in the second round of the presidential election.
- May 10
  - The United Nations General Assembly passes a resolution to grant the State of Palestine the right to be seated among member states in alphabetical order. This will go into effect at the next session of the UN General Assembly on 10 September 2024.
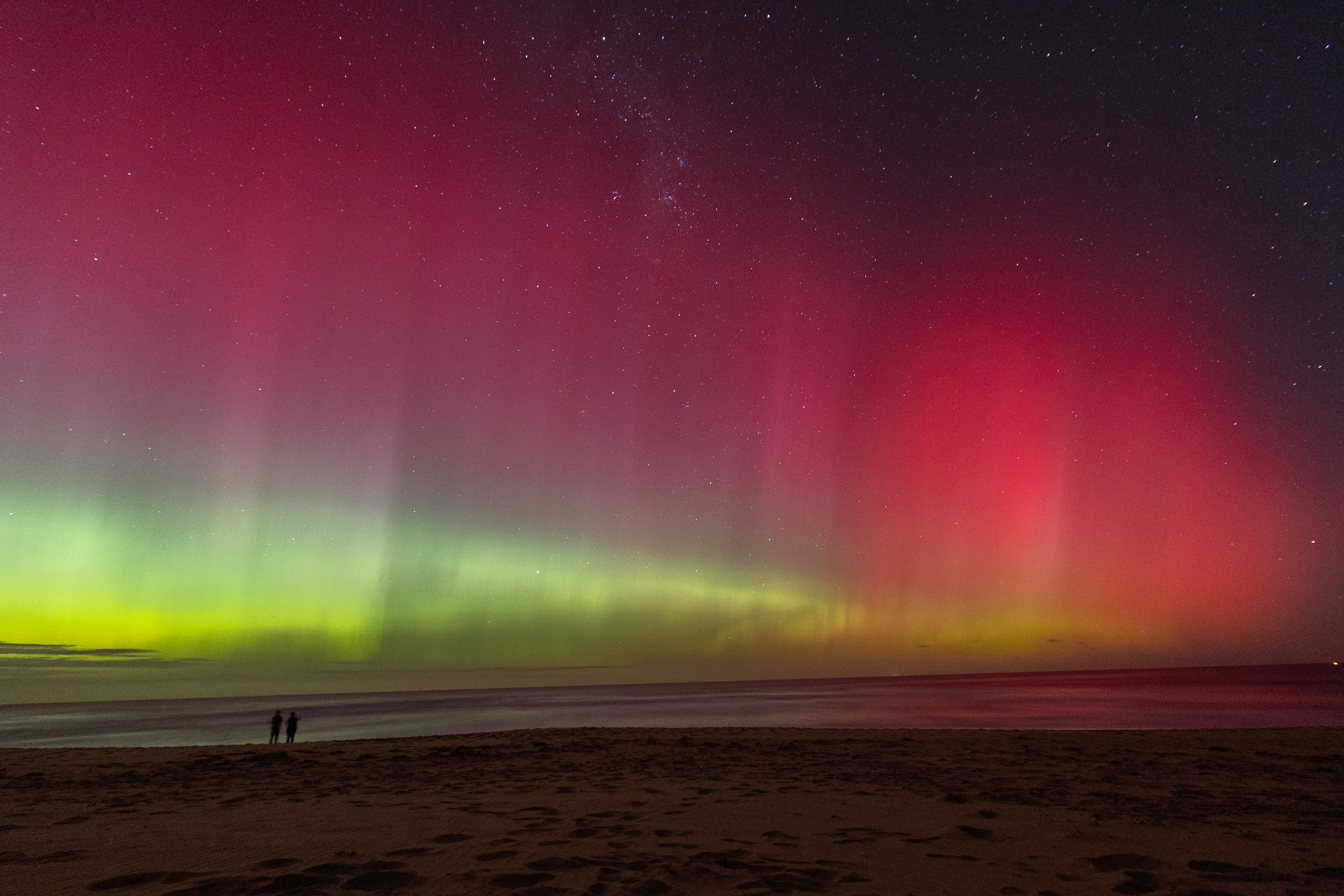
  - A series of solar storms impact the Earth, creating aurorae seen at more southerly and northerly latitudes than normal. Aurorae seen on May 12 from southern Melbourne, Victoria, Australia
    A series of solar storms and intense solar flares impact the Earth, rated G5 by NOAA, creating aurorae at more southerly and northerly latitudes than usual. This was the first G5 storm since 2003.
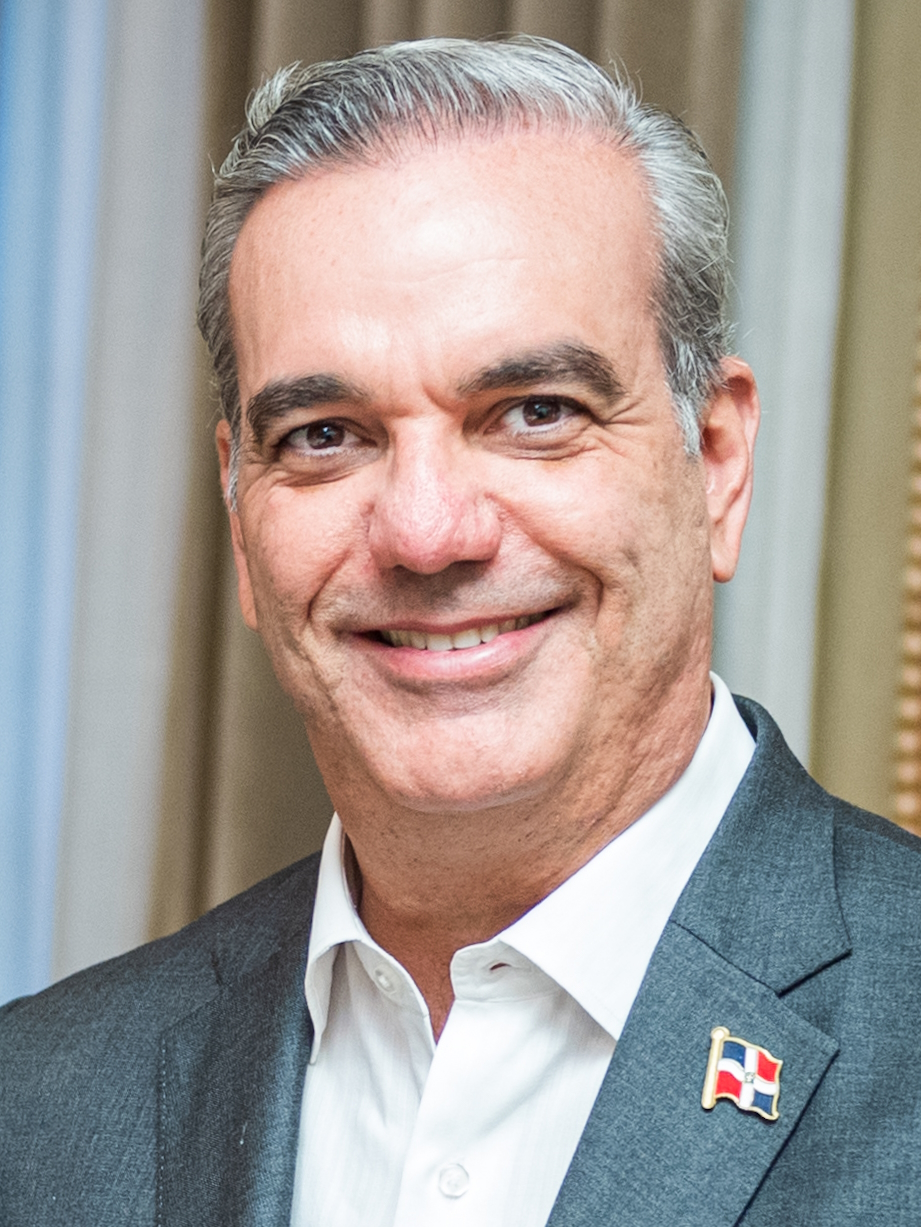
    Luis Abinader won the 2024 Dominican Republic general election on May 19
- May 15
  - Lee Hsien Loong, Prime Minister of Singapore since 2004, is succeeded by former Deputy Prime Minister Lawrence Wong as prime minister, ahead of the next general election to be held by 2025.
  - Prime Minister of Slovakia Robert Fico is shot and hospitalized while meeting with supporters at an event in Handlová.

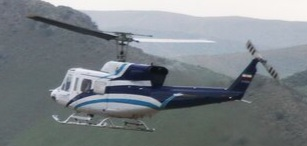
Iranian President Ebrahim Raisi and Iranian Foreign Minister Hossein Amir-Abdollahian are killed, along with seven other passengers and crew, in a helicopter crash near the Azerbaijan–Iran border on May 19.

- May 19
  - 2024 Dominican Republic general election: Incumbent Luis Abinader is reelected for a second term as president.
  - Iranian President Ebrahim Raisi and Iranian Foreign Minister Hossein Amir-Abdollahian are killed, along with seven other passengers and crew, in a helicopter crash near the Azerbaijan–Iran border.
  - A coup d'état attempt in the Democratic Republic of the Congo reportedly led by Christian Malanga leads to unrest in Kinshasa. Government soldiers quickly intervene, arresting the coup leaders and reportedly restoring calm.
- May 20 – The chief prosecutor of the International Criminal Court seeks arrest warrants for Israeli Prime Minister Benjamin Netanyahu and Hamas leader in Gaza Yahya Sinwar over alleged war crimes.
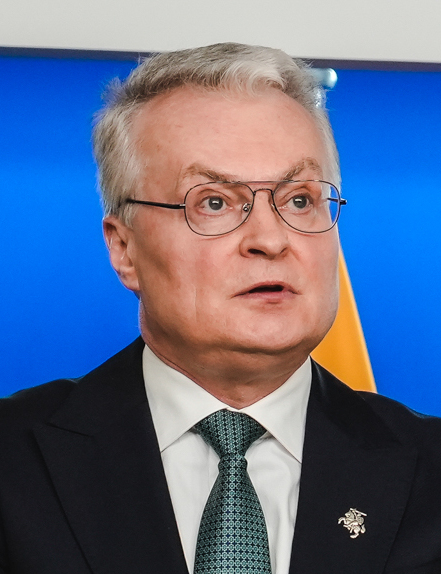
  Incumbent president Gitanas Nausėda wins a landslide victory on May 26 in the 2024 Lithuanian presidential election for a second term in office.
- May 24
  - The UN's highest court, the ICJ, rules that Israel must halt its military offensive in Rafah, southern Gaza.
  - A major landslide in Papua New Guinea kills 160–2,000+ people, with many more buried.
- May 26 – 2024 Lithuanian presidential election: Incumbent president Gitanas Nausėda wins a landslide victory for a second term in office.
- May 28 – Spain, Ireland and Norway recognize the State of Palestine.
- May 29
  - 2024 South African general election: The ANC party fails to win a majority of the vote for the first time in South Africa's democratic history.
  - 2024 Malagasy parliamentary election: President Andry Rajoelina's party, Tanora Malagasy Vonona, loses their majority at the National Assembly, winning only 80 seats out of 163.
- May 30 – Former United States President Donald Trump is found guilty on 34 counts in his hush money trial, the first time any American president had been found guilty of a crime.

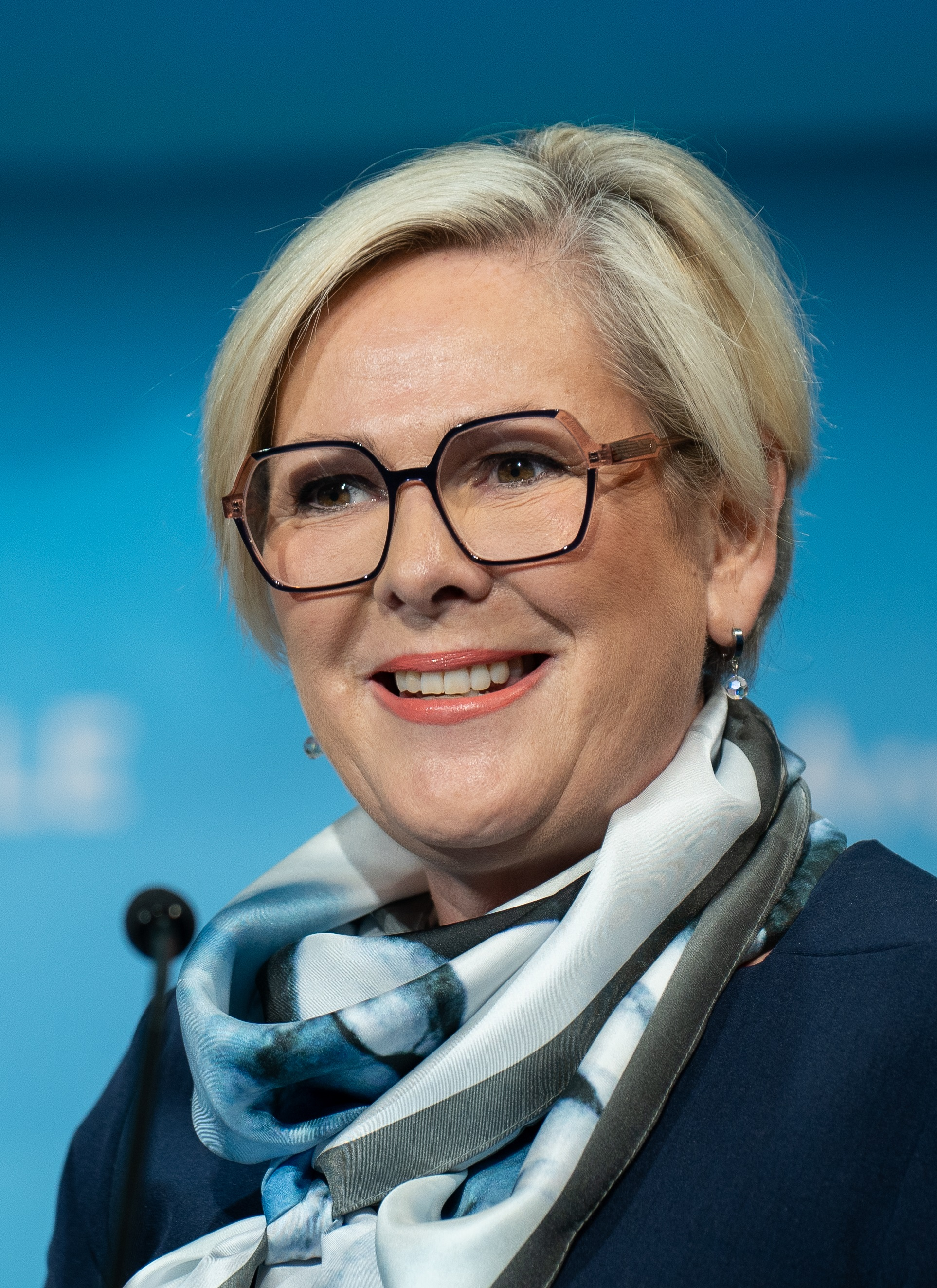
Halla Tómasdóttir wins the 2024 Icelandic presidential election on June 1.

=== June ===
- June 1
  - The 2024 Indian general election, which began on April 19, concludes. In the Lok Sabha, the BJP party loses its outright majority, but its electoral alliance, the National Democratic Alliance, retains its majority.
  - The 2024 Icelandic presidential election is held, with Halla Tómasdóttir elected president of Iceland.
- June 1–29 – The 2024 ICC Men's T20 World Cup is co-hosted by the West Indies and the United States, and is won by India.
- June 2 – The 2024 Mexican general election is held, with Claudia Sheinbaum elected as president of Mexico.
- June 5 – Starliner Crewed Flight Test launches atop an Atlas V rocket to the ISS.
- June 6–9 – The 2024 European Parliament election is held. The EPP, of incumbent Commission President Ursula von der Leyen, retains its status as the largest group in parliament amid notable gains by far-right political groups.
- June 9
  - 2024 San Marino general election: The Democracy and Freedom alliance, headed by the PDCS, wins a plurality in the Grand and General Council.
  - 2024 Belgian federal election: The New Flemish Alliance remains the largest party in the Chamber of Representatives while Open Vld, the party of outgoing Prime Minister Alexander De Croo, loses seats.
  - June 2024 Bulgarian parliamentary election: Boyko Borisov's coalition GERB–SDS wins a plurality of seats but fails to form a stable government.
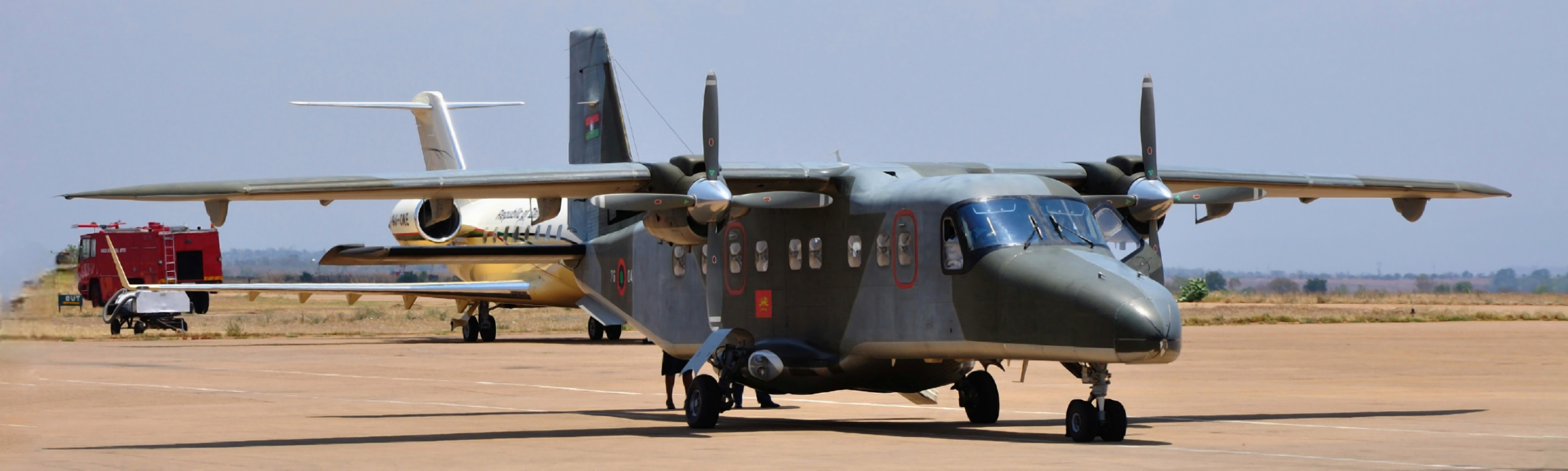
- A plane crash on June 10 near Chikangawa, Malawi, kills nine people, including Vice President of Malawi Saulos Chilima
  June 10 – A plane crash near Chikangawa, Malawi, kills nine people, including Vice President of Malawi Saulos Chilima.
- June 12 – The United Nations' first inquiry into the October 7 attacks and resulting conflict finds that both Israel and Hamas committed war crimes.
- June 14 – 2024 South African general election: The ANC and other opposition parties agree to form a national unity government, with Cyril Ramaphosa being re-elected President of South Africa.
- June 14 – July 14 – UEFA Euro 2024 is held in Germany, and is won by Spain.
- June 20 – July 14 – The 2024 Copa América is held in the United States, and is won by Argentina.
- June 23
  - On the Grand Duke's Official Birthday, Henri, Grand Duke of Luxembourg announces that his son and heir Guillaume will assume royal duties beginning in October, in preparation for Henri's eventual abdication.
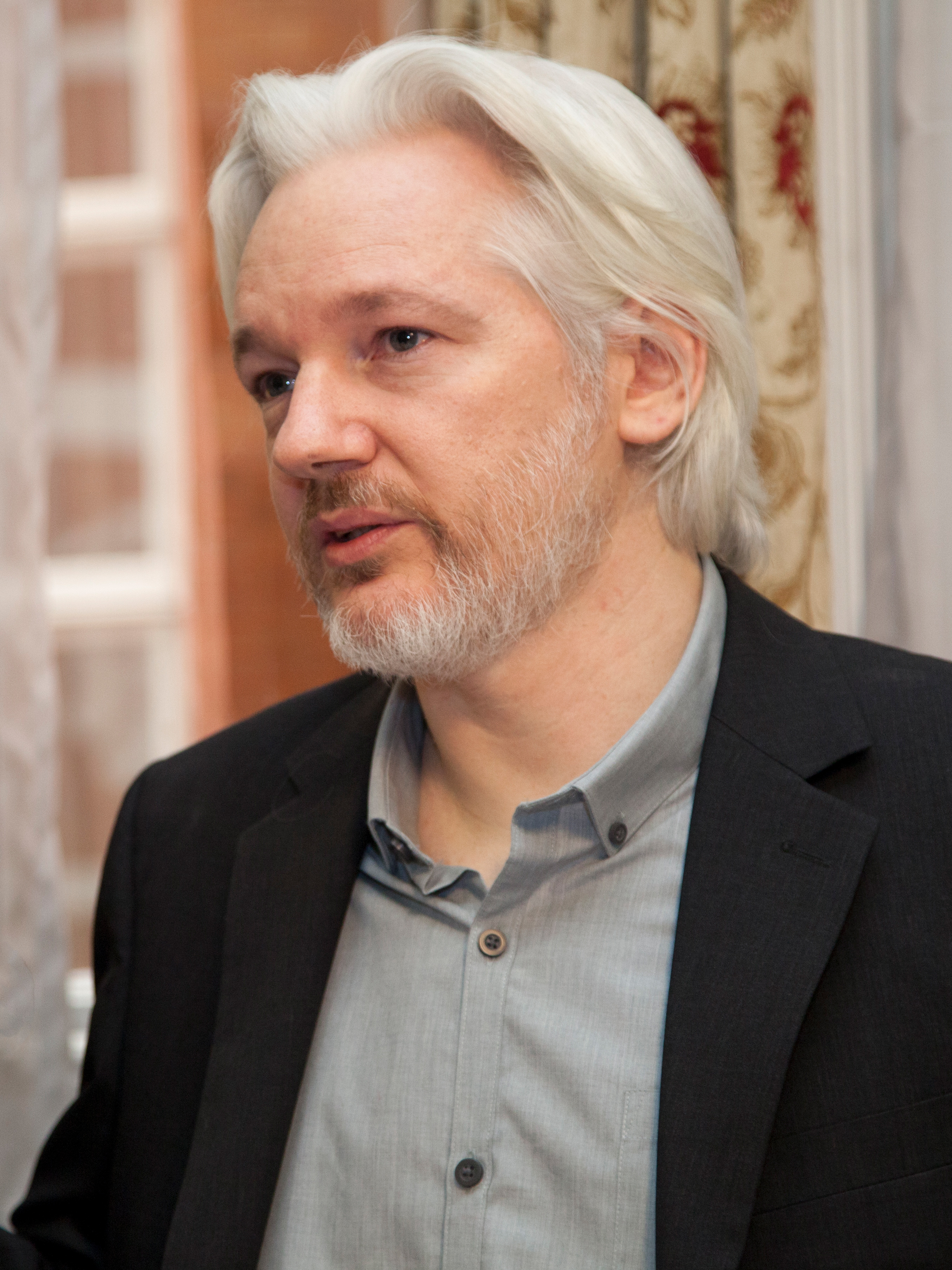
  - Julian Assange was freed from prison on June 24
    2024 Hajj disaster: More than 1,300 people are reported to have died due to extreme heat during the annual Hajj pilgrimage in Mecca, Saudi Arabia.
  - 2024 Dagestan attacks: Two coordinated attacks occur in the cities of Makhachkala and Derbent in the Republic of Dagestan in southern Russia, injuring 46 and killing 28 people.
- June 24 – WikiLeaks founder Julian Assange leaves the United Kingdom after being freed from prison in a plea deal with the United States. He returns to his native Australia two days later.
- June 25 – Negotiations on the accession of Moldova and Ukraine to the European Union have officially begun.
- June 26 – A failed coup d'état attempt in La Paz, Bolivia is led by the former General Commander Juan José Zúñiga.
- June 28 – 2024 Mongolian parliamentary election: The Mongolian People's Party wins a reduced majority of seats in the State Great Khural amid gains by the Democratic Party.
- June 29
  - 2024 Mauritanian presidential election: Incumbent president Mohamed Ould Ghazouani wins re-election to a second term.
  - 2024 Borno State bombings: 30 people are killed and 100 are injured when three separate bomb blasts occur in the town of Gwoza in Borno State, Nigeria.
- June 30 - Daniil Nikolov is elected as the 29th Patriarch of the Bulgarian Orthodox Church.

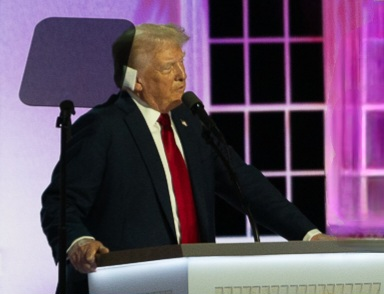
Donald Trump's ear was injured in an assassination attempt on July 13.

=== July ===
- July 1 – Hurricane Beryl becomes the earliest Category 5 hurricane on record after devastating the island of Carriacou, Grenada.
- July 4 – 2024 United Kingdom general election: Sir Keir Starmer leads the Labour Party to victory, returning the party to government for the first time in 14 years.
- July 5 – 2024 Iranian presidential election: Masoud Pezeshkian is elected president of Iran.
- July 7 – 2024 French legislative election: The left-wing New Popular Front wins the most seats in the National Assembly, upsetting a first-round victory by the far-right National Rally, but fails to achieve a majority.
- July 9–11 – The 33rd NATO summit is held in Washington, D.C.
- July 13 – While campaigning for the 2024 United States presidential election, former President Donald Trump is shot in the right ear in an assassination attempt at a rally he held near Butler, Pennsylvania.
- July 15 – 2024 Rwandan general election: Incumbent Paul Kagame is reelected for a fourth term.

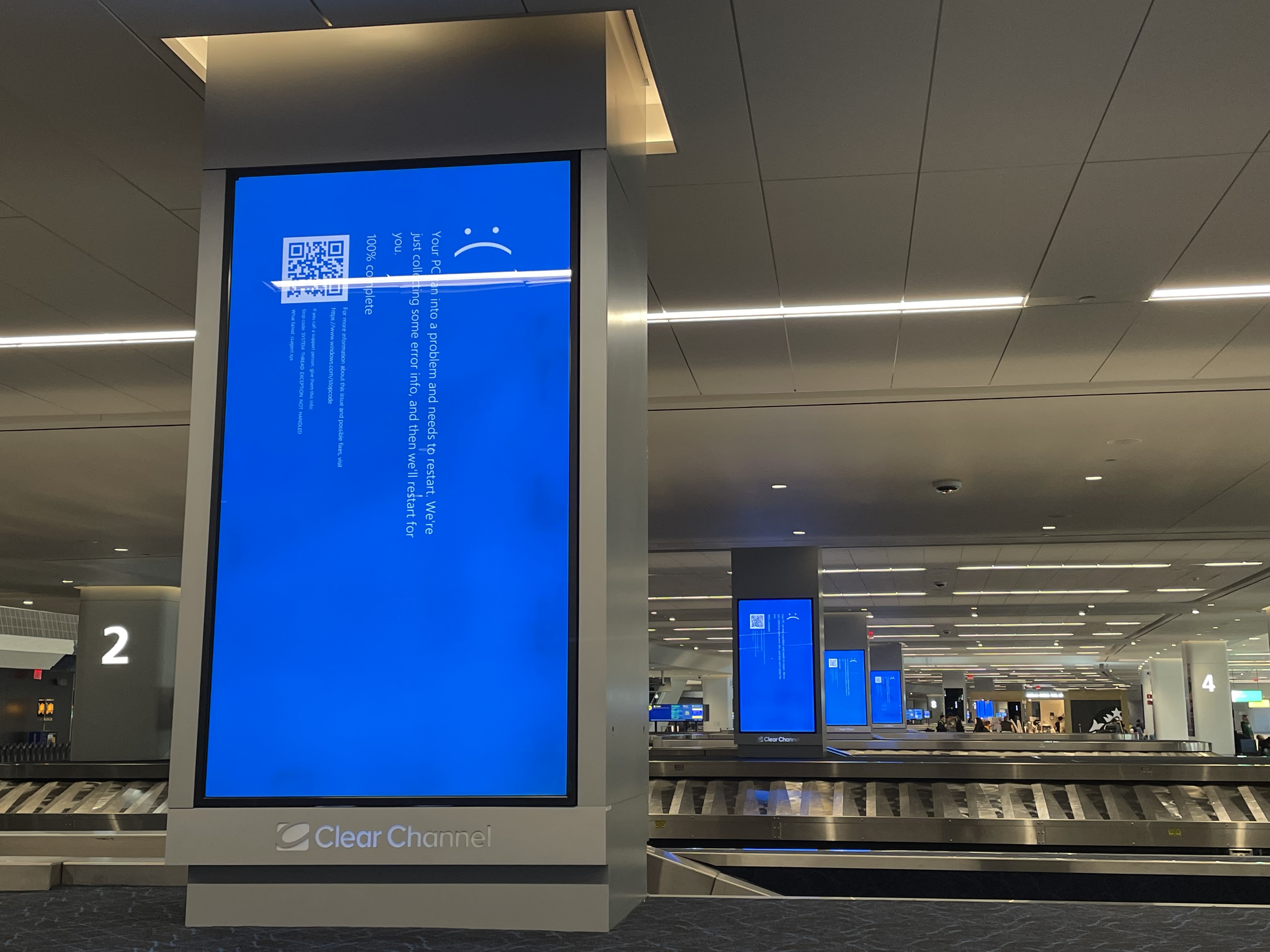
Blue screens caused by a worldwide faulty CrowdStrike software update on July 19 at LaGuardia Airport, New York City

- July 19
  - Global IT outages impact a variety of businesses and organisations across the world.
  - 75 people are killed during the 2024 Bangladesh quota reform movement. The government of Bangladesh imposes a curfew.
- July 22 – Landslides kill 257 people and bury two villages in Geze Gofa, Gofa Zuria, Ethiopia.
- July 23 – China brokers a unity agreement between rival Palestinian factions Fatah and Hamas to form a single government.
- July 26 – August 11 – The 2024 Summer Olympics are held in Paris, France. The controversial opening ceremony and the boxing match of Luca Hámori and Imane Khelif spark international debate.
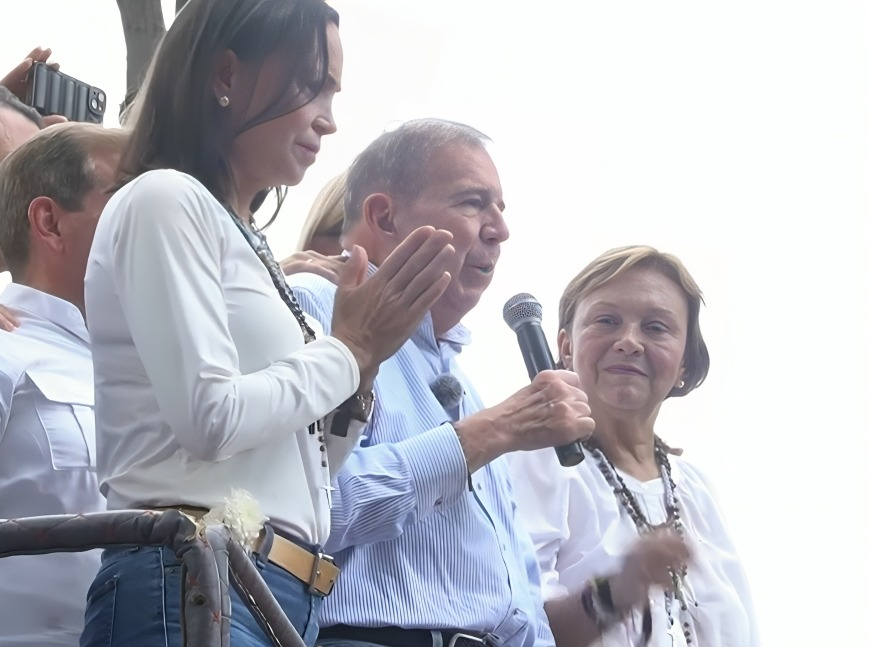
- María Corina Machado and Edmundo González along with his wife, addressing supporters in Caracas following the 2024 presidential election results
  July 28 – 2024 Venezuelan presidential election: Incumbent President Nicolás Maduro declares victory against opposition candidate Edmundo González Urrutia amid alleged irregularities, causing numerous South American states to refuse to acknowledge the results or suspend diplomatic relations with the Maduro government and sparking nationwide protests.
- July 30
  - At least 334 people are killed, over 200 injured, and 281 missing following landslides in Wayanad district, Kerala, India.
  - Israel carries out an airstrike in the Dahieh suburb of Beirut, killing Hezbollah commander Fuad Shukr, who it accused of ordering the Majdal Shams attack.
  - 2024 United Kingdom riots: Far-right riots break out throughout the United Kingdom in response to a mass stabbing in Southport, England.
- July 31
  - Ismail Haniyeh, the political leader of Hamas, is assassinated at his residence in Tehran, Iran.
  - Moussa Dadis Camara, the former military ruler of Guinea, is found guilty of crimes against humanity in the massacres that occurred in 2009 and is sentenced to twenty years in prison by a Guinean court.

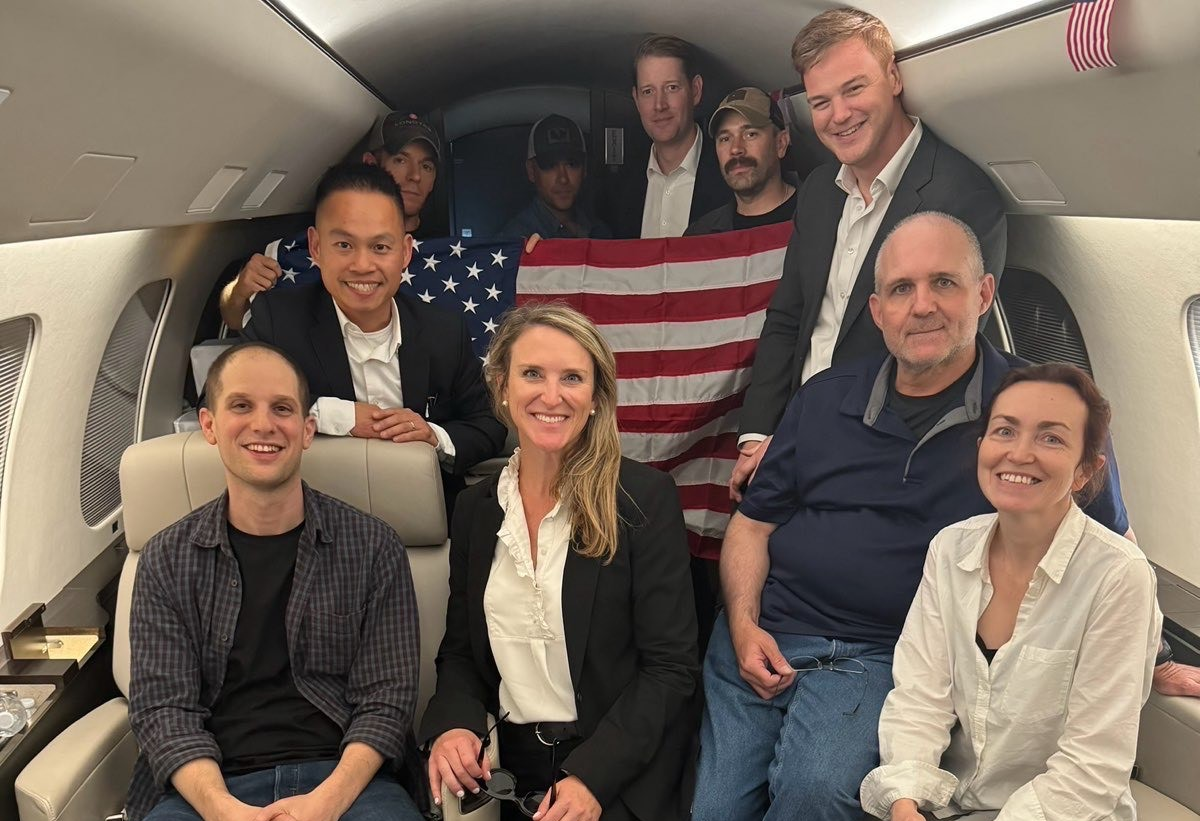
Twenty-six individuals are released on August 1 from Ankara Esenboğa Airport in the largest prisoner exchange between the United States and Russia since the Cold War.

=== August ===
- August 1 – 2024 American–Russian prisoner exchange: 26 individuals are released from Ankara Esenboğa Airport in the largest prisoner exchange between the United States and Russia since the Cold War.

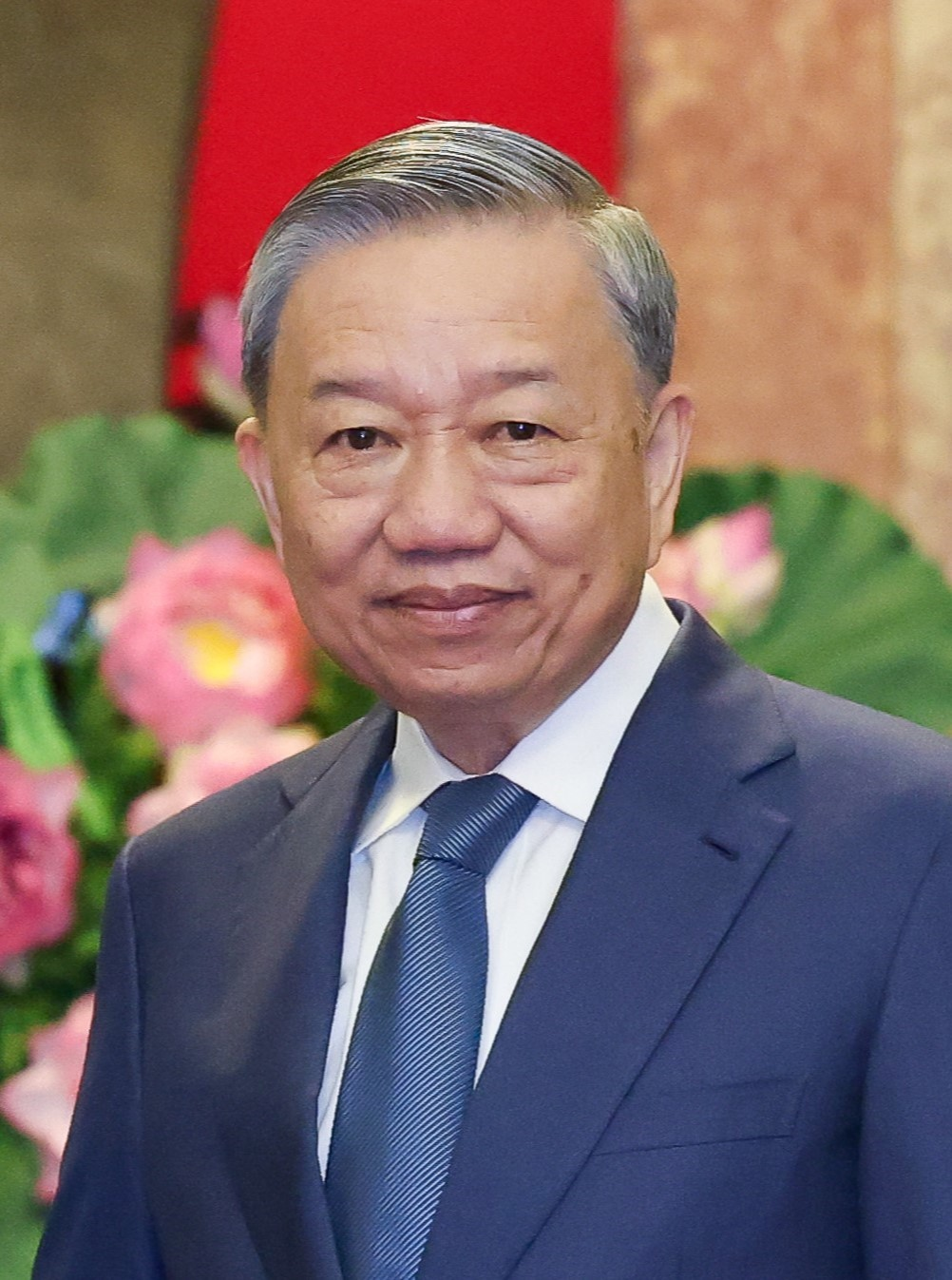
Tô Lâm succeeds Nguyễn Phú Trọng as General Secretary of the Communist Party of Vietnam on August 3

- August 3 – The Central Committee of the Communist Party of Vietnam elects Tô Lâm as the new General Secretary of the Communist Party of Vietnam, succeeding Nguyễn Phú Trọng, who died on July 19.
- August 5 – Prime Minister of Bangladesh Sheikh Hasina announces her resignation and flees to India following nationwide protests.
- August 6 – Yahya Sinwar, Hamas' leader in the Gaza Strip, is appointed as the chairman of Hamas' political bureau.
- August 7 – The Move Forward Party is dissolved and Pita Limjaroenrat, alongside other senior politicians from the party, are banned from politics by the Constitutional Court of Thailand.
- August 8 – Nobel laureate Muhammad Yunus assumes office as Chief Adviser of an interim government formed after Sheikh Hasina's resignation in Bangladesh.
- August 9 – Voepass Flight 2283, an ATR 72, crashes near Vinhedo, São Paulo, Brazil, killing all 62 people on board.
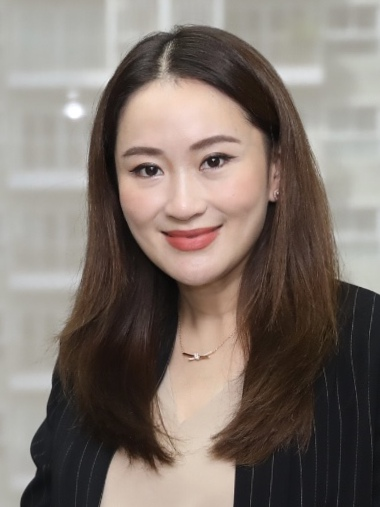
- Paetongtarn Shinawatra succeeds Srettha Thavisin as Prime Minister of Thailand after the latter's dismissal by the Constitutional Court of Thailand on August 14
  August 11 – President Volodymyr Zelenskyy announces that the Ukrainian military is conducting a cross-border offensive inside Russia's western Kursk Oblast. Russia says that 76,000 people have been evacuated from the region.
- August 13 – 2024 Kolkata rape and murder: Thousands of doctors and students take part in protests and rallies against domestic violence in cities across the world after the rape and murder of a 31 year old post-graduate trainee doctor in Kolkata on 9 August.
- August 14
  - The World Health Organization (WHO) declares mpox a public health emergency of international concern for the second time in two years, following the spread of the virus in African countries.
  - The Constitutional Court of Thailand dismisses the Prime Minister Srettha Thavisin for illegally appointing a minister to his cabinet who had a prison sentence. Paetongtarn Shinawatra succeeds him as Prime Minister of Thailand.
- August 23 – In Solingen, Germany, a Syrian immigrant stabs three people to death, which leads to the intensification of the debate on migration in Germany.
- August 24 – In Barsalogho, Burkina Faso, 600 civilians are victims of a massacre by Islamists associated with Al-Qaeda.
- August 25 – The Israel Defense Forces begin a series of preemptive strikes against targets in the south of Lebanon.
- August 28 – September 8 – The 2024 Summer Paralympics are held in Paris, France.
- August 31 – A helicopter crashed in Kamchatka Krai, Russia, killing all 22 occupants on board.

Infrared satellite imagery of Typhoon Yagi making landfall over Hainan on September 6

=== September ===
- September 2 – The Brazilian Supreme Court upholds a decision to block the social media platform X (also known as Twitter) over what the Brazilian government determined to be rampant disinformation and Elon Musk's failure to name a legal representative to the country.
- September 7 – 2024 Algerian presidential election: Incumbent Abdelmadjid Tebboune is reelected for a second term.
  Weather in Central Europe on 12 September, right before floods
- September 12
  - Heavy rainfall in Central Europe triggers the worst flooding in the region since 2010.
  - The first commercial spacewalk is conducted by entrepreneur Jared Isaacman as part of the Polaris Dawn mission, which also includes the highest altitude orbit by a human crew since the Apollo program.
- September 15 – Ryan Wesley Routh is accused of attempting to assassinate Donald Trump in Florida. Routh is later captured and arrested, and a trial date has been set for 2025.
- September 17–18 – Thirty-two people are killed and more than 3,200 are injured after pagers and walkie-talkies used by Hezbollah militants and medics explode in two massive cyberattacks. Israel is the presumed perpetrator.
- September 20 – Israel assassinates Hezbollah leader Ibrahim Aqil and ten other senior leaders in Beirut following an intensification of fighting between Israel and Hezbollah in the wake of the pager explosions that occurred earlier in the week.
- September 21 – 2024 Sri Lankan presidential election: Anura Kumara Dissanayake is elected President of Sri Lanka, with a second round of vote counting held for the first time in Sri Lanka's history.
  Hurricane Helene made landfall in the United States on September 26
- September 23 – The deadliest day of the Hezbollah–Israel conflict since 2006 occurs, with 569 people killed and 1,835 wounded by Israeli airstrikes in Lebanon.
- September 26 – Hurricane Helene, the deadliest Atlantic hurricane since Hurricane Maria in 2017, makes landfall in Florida as a category four hurricane. It has a death toll of 236 and leaves more than 685 missing.

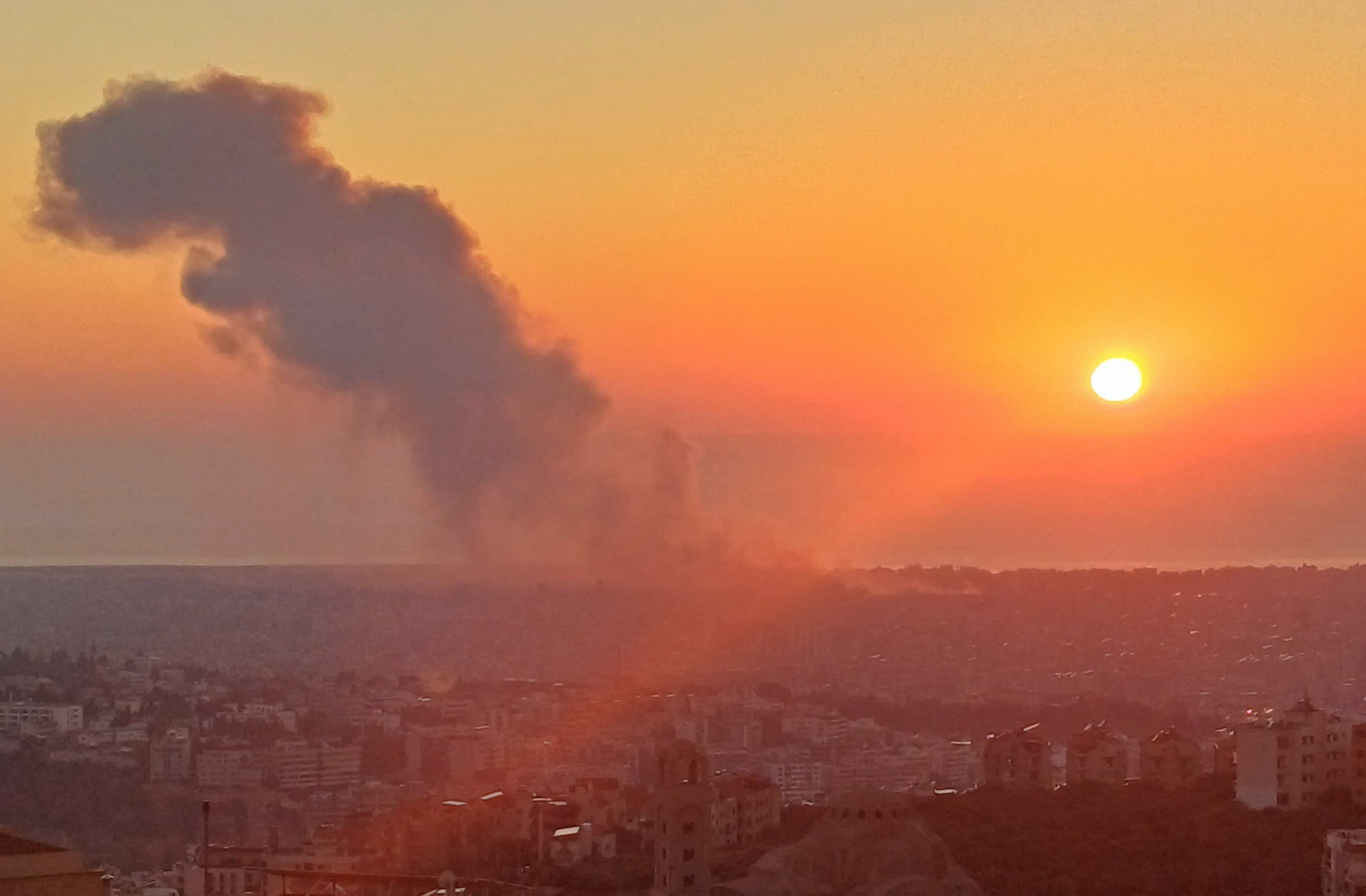
Rising smoke in Beirut after the assassination of Hezbollah leader, Hassan Nasrallah on September 27

- September 27 – The Israeli Air Force bombs the central headquarters of Hezbollah in Beirut, killing several people, including Hezbollah leader Hassan Nasrallah.
- September 29 – 2024 Austrian legislative election: Far-right Freedom Party secures a historical victory, but does not reach a majority in the National Council. The results are deemed the first far-right win since World War II.
- September 30 – The UK becomes the first G7 country to phase out coal power for electric generation, after 142 years of using the energy source.

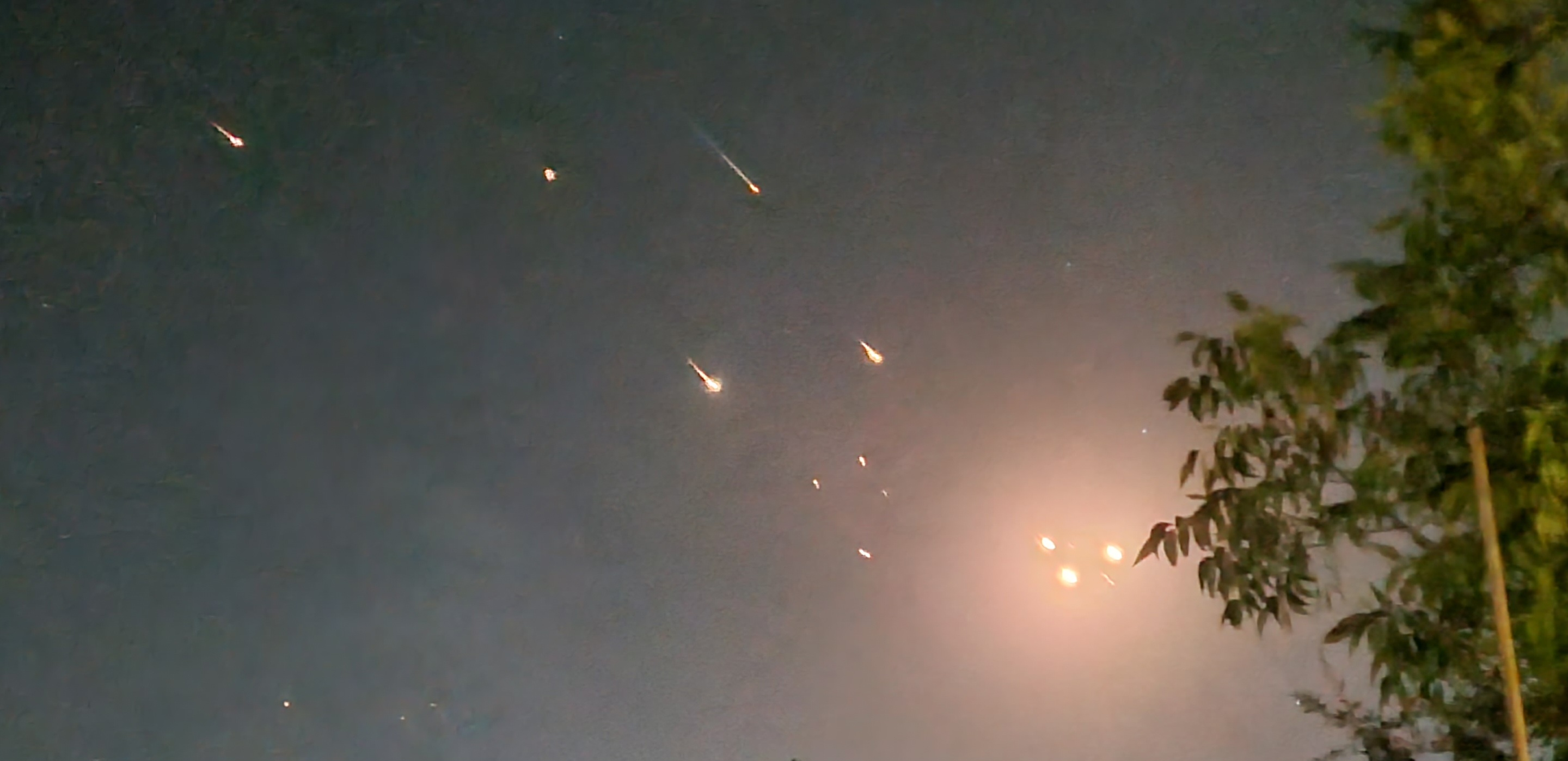
Iran attacks Israel with ballistic missiles as a response to Israel's offensive against Hezbollah in Lebanon on October 1

=== October ===
- October 1
  - The Israel Defense Forces invade southern Lebanon, escalating its conflict against Hezbollah.
  - The Japanese parliament elects Shigeru Ishiba as the new prime minister of Japan, with members from the Liberal Democratic Party forming the majority. Following his appointment, he reveals his cabinet and calls for a snap election on October 27, securing a national mandate.
  - Iran attacks Israel with ballistic missiles as a response to Israel's assassination of Hassan Nasrallah and Ismail Haniyeh.
- October 3–20 – The 2024 ICC Women's T20 World Cup is held in the United Arab Emirates, and is won by New Zealand.
- October 6
  - The 2024 Kazakh nuclear power referendum is held and approved.
  - 2024 Tunisian presidential election: Incumbent Kais Saied is reelected for a second term.
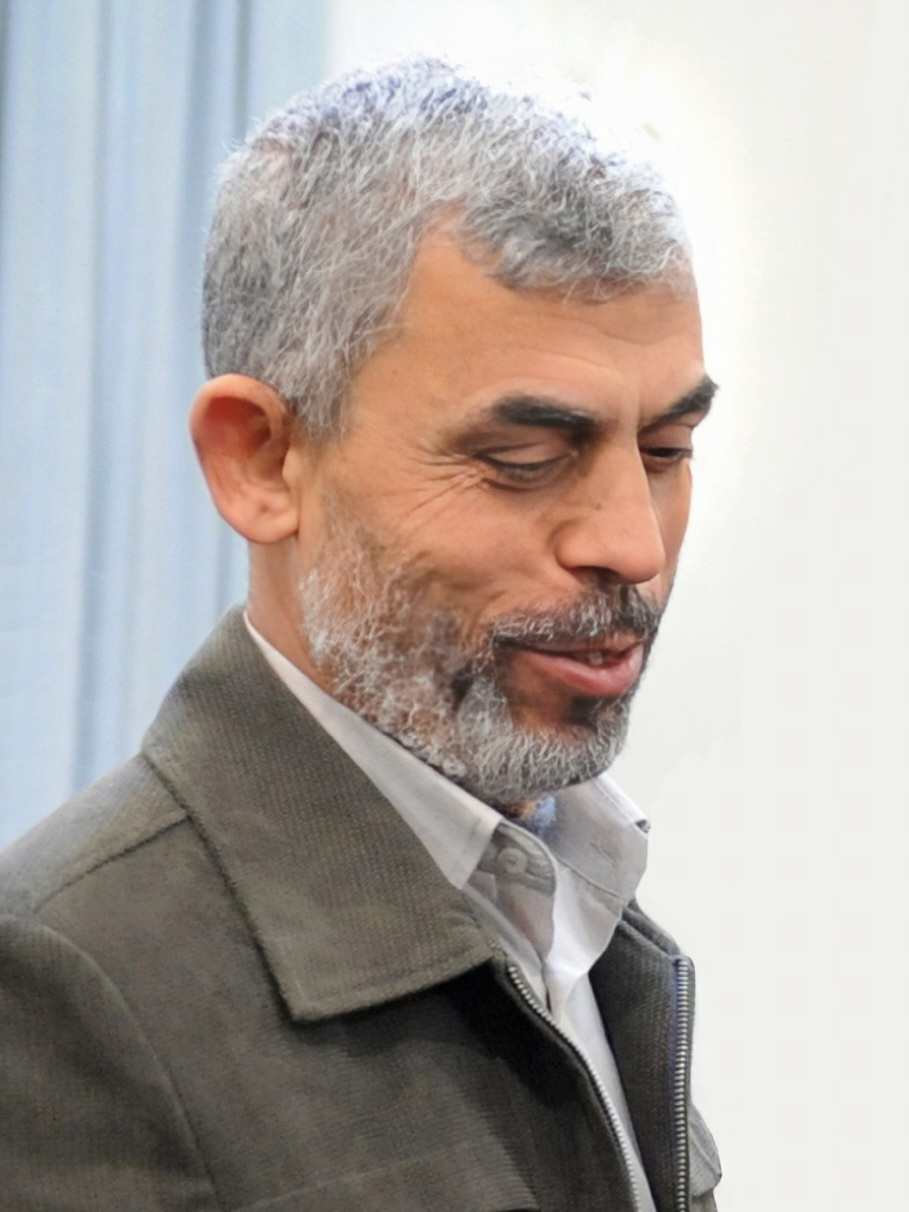
- Yahya Sinwar, leader of Hamas, was killed by the Israeli Defense Forces on October 16
  October 7 – Hurricane Milton becomes the fourth most intense hurricane in the Atlantic Basin, and the most intense storm in the Gulf of Mexico tying with Hurricane Rita in 2005. Milton is also the first hurricane to reach a pressure below 900 millibars in nearly 20 years.
- October 9 – 2024 Mozambican general election: Daniel Chapo is elected president while the ruling FRELIMO party retains a majority in the Assembly of the Republic.
- October 12 – The long-period comet C/2023 A3 (Tsuchinshan–ATLAS), described as the "comet of the century", makes its closest approach to Earth.
- October 13 – SpaceX achieves the first successful return and capture of a Super Heavy booster from Starship, the biggest and most powerful rocket ever to fly.
- October 14 – The Europa Clipper spacecraft is launched to investigate Europa, an icy moon of Jupiter.
- October 16 – Yahya Sinwar, leader of Hamas, is killed in a gunfight with Israeli forces in Rafah.
- October 20
  - The 2024 Moldovan European Union membership constitutional referendum is held and narrowly approved.
  - Prabowo Subianto and Gibran Rakabuming Raka are inaugurated as the president and vice president of Indonesia.
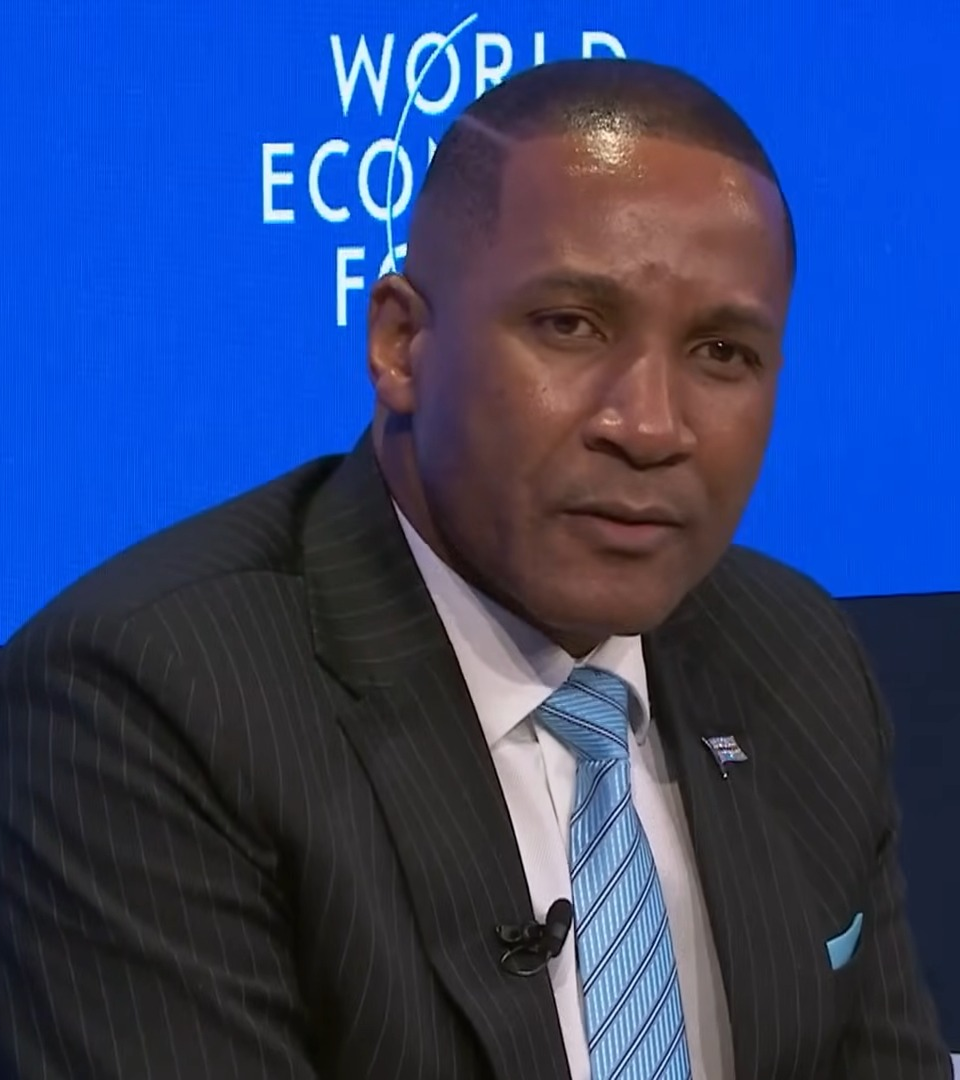
- Duma Boko won the 2024 Botswana general election on October 30
  October 21 – The National Assembly of Vietnam elects Lương Cường as the new president of Vietnam. He replaced Tô Lâm, who was formally promoted to the general secretary of the Communist Party.
- October 24 – The first case of the 2024 Kwango province disease outbreak is reported in the Democratic Republic of the Congo.
- October 26
  - Israel launches airstrikes against Iran in retaliation to Iran's ballistic missile attacks earlier in the month.
  - 2024 Georgian parliamentary election: Amid suspicions of interference, ruling pro-Russian party Georgian Dream wins a majority.
- October 27
  - 2024 Japanese general election: The governing LDP loses its parliamentary majority for the first time since 2009, but still wins the most seats. The CDP wins its best result in party history.
  - October 2024 Bulgarian parliamentary election: Boyko Borsiov's coalition GERB-SDS successfully forms a government after 6 snap elections.
  - 2024 Lithuanian parliamentary election: The leftist opposition Social Democratic Party of Lithuania wins a majority.
- October 29 – 2024 Spanish floods: Spain experiences its worst flooding in half a century, with over 200 killed and many more missing, as a year's worth of rain falls in eight hours.
- October 30 – 2024 Botswana general election: The ruling BDP party is voted out of power, ending 58 years of uninterrupted governance. Duma Boko of the UDC party is elected President of Botswana.

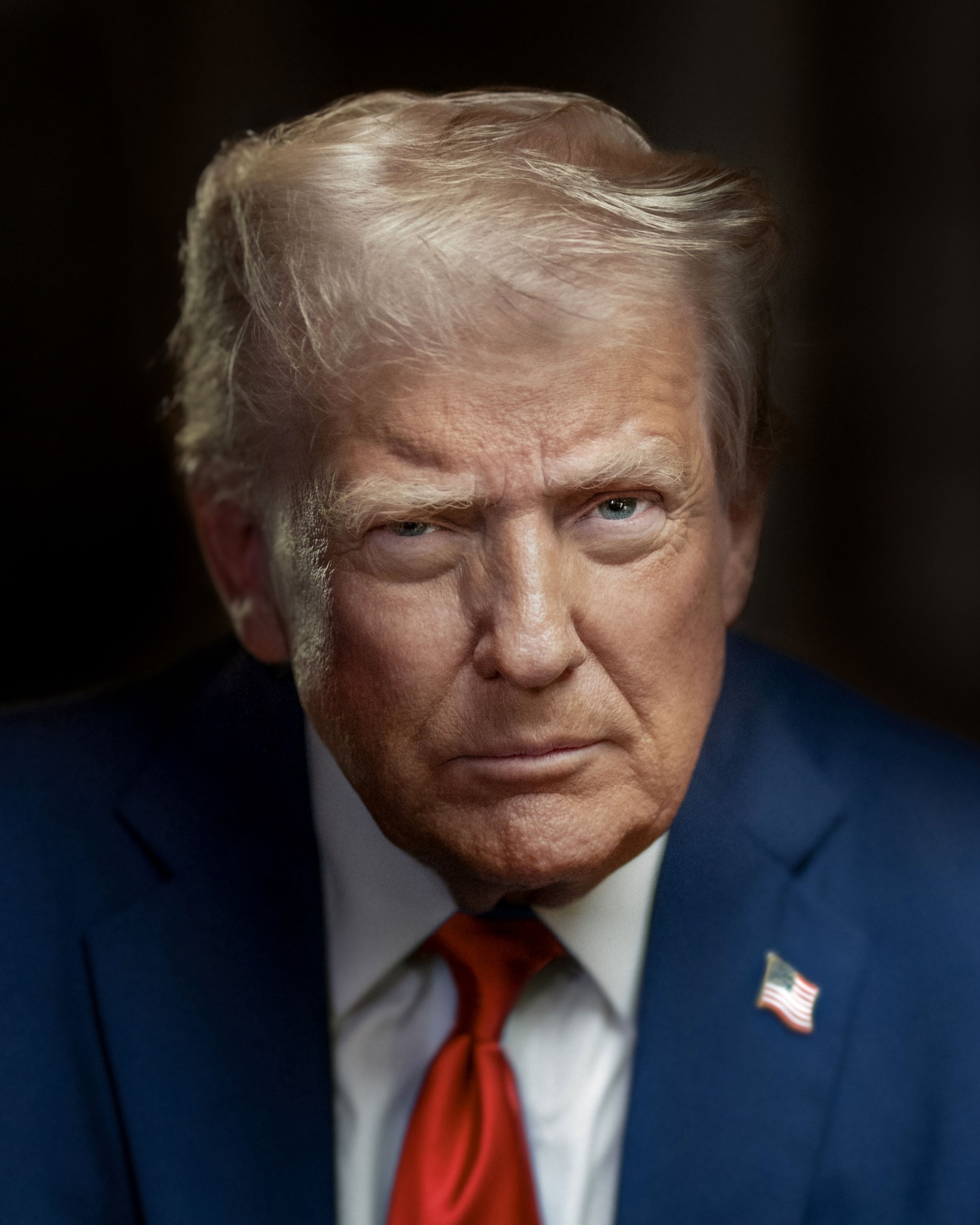
Donald Trump won the 2024 United States presidential election on November 5

=== November ===
- November 3 – 2024 Moldovan presidential election: Incumbent Maia Sandu is re-elected for a second term.
- November 5
  - 2024 United States presidential election: Former U.S. President Donald Trump defeats incumbent Vice President Kamala Harris to win a second nonconsecutive term, becoming the second person in American history elected to nonconsecutive presidential terms, after Grover Cleveland in 1892.
  - 2024 Palauan general election: Incumbent Surangel Whipps Jr. is reelected for a second term as president.
  - German Chancellor Olaf Scholz dismisses FDP leader Christian Lindner from his position as finance minister, leading to two other FDP ministers resigning and the collapse of the governing coalition.
- November 9 – A suicide bombing at the Quetta railway station in Balochistan, Pakistan kills at least 26 people. The bombing was orchestrated by the Balochistan Liberation Army (BLA), and is the first time that the organization had attacked the center of Quetta.
- November 10 – 2024 Mauritian general election: The electoral alliance Lepep of incumbent Prime Minister Pravind Jugnauth is defeated by that of opposition leader and former Prime Minister Navin Ramgoolam, with the latter taking all but two seats.
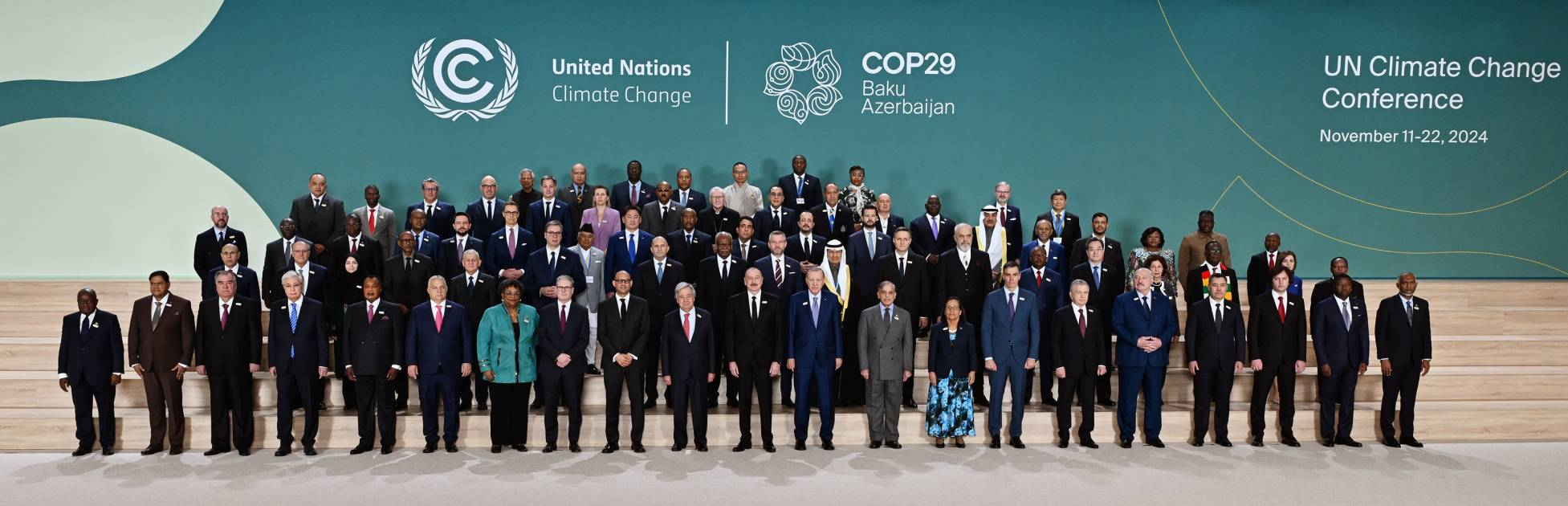
  COP29 is held in Baku, Azerbaijan, from November 11–22
- November 11–22 – COP29 is held in Baku, Azerbaijan.
- November 12 – Justin Welby announces his resignation as Archbishop of Canterbury following the publication of a report critical of his handling of the abuse of children within the Church of England by John Smyth.
- November 13 – 2024 Somaliland presidential election: Opposition candidate Abdirahman Mohamed Abdullahi of the Waddani party is elected president.
- November 14 – 2024 Sri Lankan parliamentary election: President Anura Kumara Dissanayake's National People's Power coalition wins a supermajority in the 17th Parliament of Sri Lanka.
- November 15 – The spotted hyena (Crocuta crocuta) Is rediscovered in the Elba Protected Area of Southeast Egypt, 5,000 years after the species was believed to have been extirpated from the region.
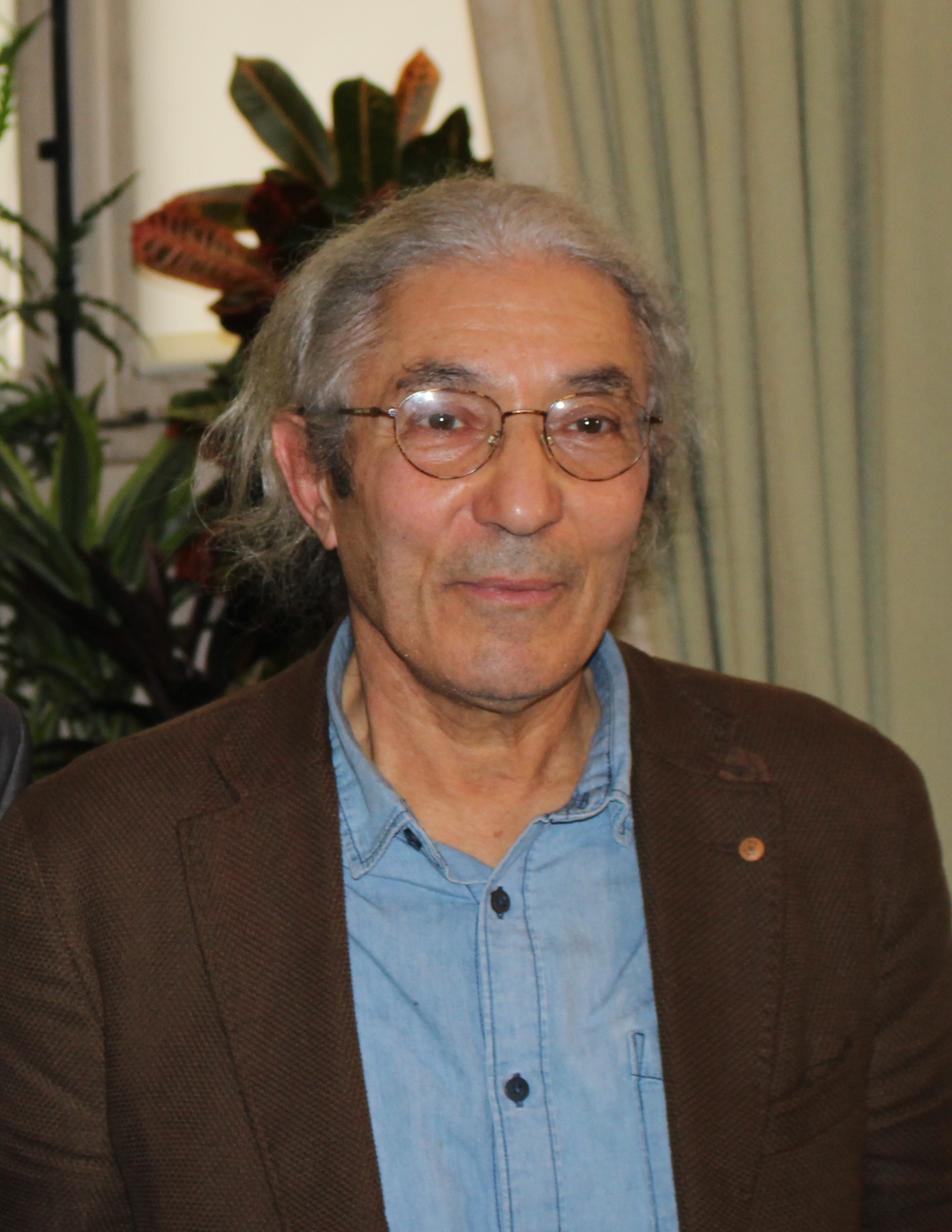
  French-Algerian writer Boualem Sansal is put in custody by Algerian authorities after his landing in Algiers on November 16.
- November 16
  - The 2024 Gabonese constitutional referendum is held and approved.
  - French-Algerian dissident writer Boualem Sansal is put in custody by Algerian authorities after his landing in Algiers.
- November 17 – 2024 Senegalese parliamentary election: President Bassirou Diomaye Faye's party PASTEF wins an absolute majority at the National Assembly.
- November 21
  - The International Criminal Court (ICC) issues arrest warrants against Israeli Prime Minister Benjamin Netanyahu, former Israeli Defense Minister Yoav Gallant, and Hamas military leader Mohammed Deif on accusations of war crimes committed during the Gaza war.
  - Terrorists in Peshawar, Pakistan, ambush a group of vehicles carrying Shiite Muslims, killing 46 and injuring 20.
  - Researchers using the Very Large Telescope announce the first-ever "close-up" image of a star outside the Milky Way Galaxy, WOH G64.
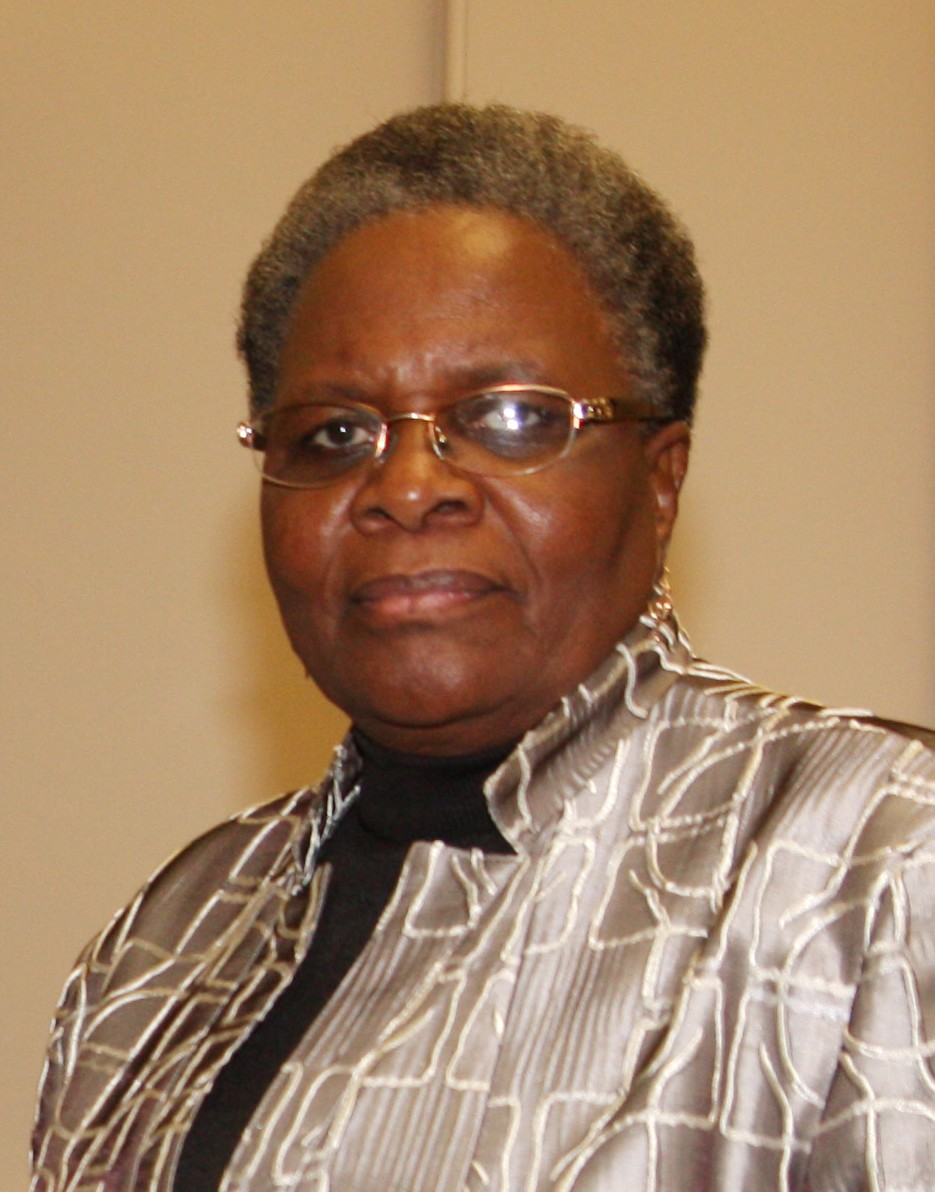
    Netumbo Nandi-Ndaitwah is elected as the first female president of Namibia on November 27.
- November 24 – 2024 Uruguayan general election: Leftist opposition candidate Yamandú Orsi is elected president.
- November 26 – Israeli Prime Minister Benjamin Netanyahu announces that a ceasefire deal has been agreed to end fighting with Hezbollah in Lebanon.
- November 27 – 2024 Namibian general election: Netumbo Nandi-Ndaitwah of the SWAPO party is elected as the first female president of Namibia.
- November 29 – 2024 Irish general election: Centre-right party Fianna Fáil remains the largest party in Dáil Éireann, increasing its number of seats to 48.
- November 30
  - 2024 Icelandic parliamentary election: Opposition party Social Democratic Alliance wins 15 seats in the Althing, with the incumbent Independence Party winning 14 seats. However, no party achieved a majority.
  - Syrian civil war: Opposition forces seize control of most of Aleppo, Syria, prompting the first Russian airstrikes on the city since 2016.

=== December ===
- December 1 – 2024 Romanian parliamentary election: The incumbent National Coalition for Romania wins a plurality of votes, with far-right parties making substantial gains.
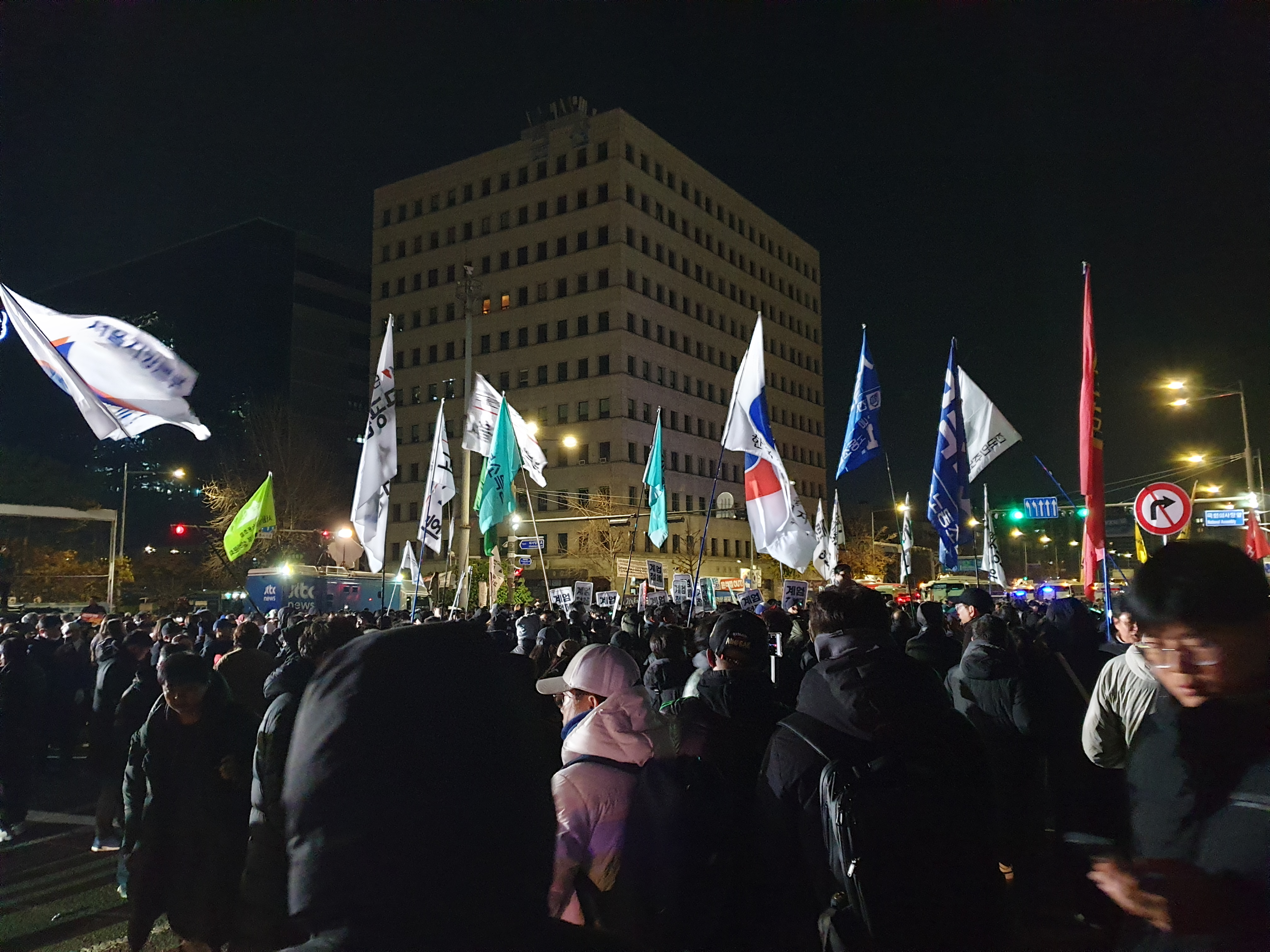
  Protest outside the National Assembly of South Korea shortly after the declaration of martial law by president Yoon Suk Yeol on December 3
- December 3 – South Korean President Yoon Suk Yeol declares martial law during a late-night address broadcast live on YTN television, accusing the country's main opposition Democratic Party of sympathizing with North Korea and engaging in anti-state activities.
- December 4
  - 2024 French political crisis: Michel Barnier becomes the first prime minister of France to lose a motion of no-confidence since Georges Pompidou in 1962.
- December 6 – 2024 Romanian presidential election: The Constitutional Court of Romania annuls the results of the first round, amid accusations of Russian interference after the unexpected advancement of pro-Russian candidate Călin Georgescu to the runoff.
- December 7
  - 2024 Ghanaian general election: John Mahama of the NDC is elected president for a second non-consecutive term.
  - The Notre-Dame Cathedral reopens to the public after previously being damaged by a structural fire in 2019.
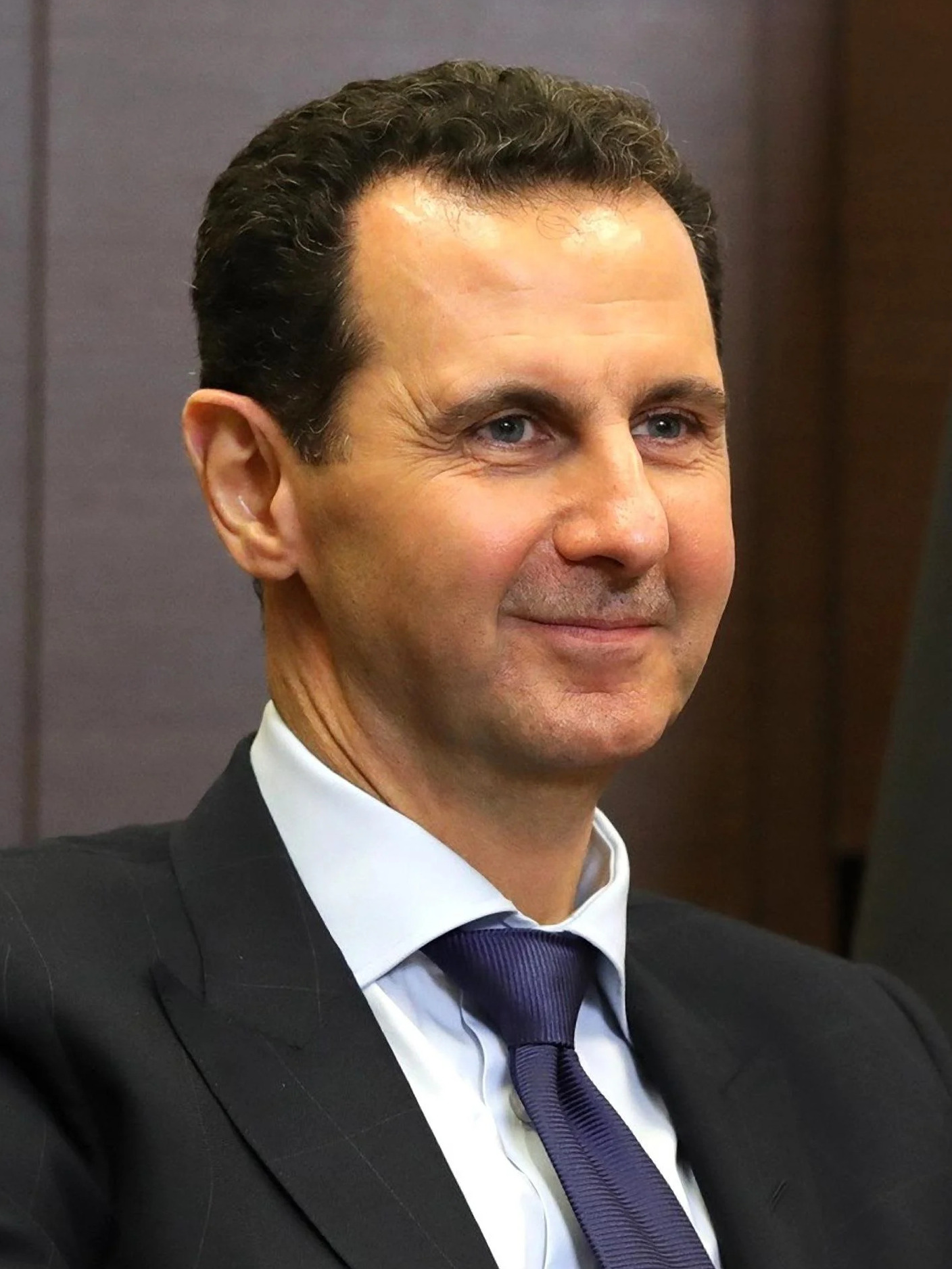
    President of Syria Bashar al-Assad's regime was overthrown as rebel forces captured the capital Damascus on December 8.
- December 8 – Syrian civil war: Syrian President Bashar al-Assad flees from Damascus to Moscow after being overthrown, ending his presidency and the Ba'athist Syria regime after a total of 61 years. The Syrian opposition forms the Syrian transitional government as a provisional government.
- December 11 – FIFA announces that Morocco, Portugal and Spain will jointly host the 2030 World Cup, with anniversary matches to be held in Argentina, Paraguay and Uruguay, while Saudi Arabia is confirmed as the host for 2034.
- December 12 – Indian chess prodigy Gukesh Dommaraju defeats former world champion Ding Liren in the 2024 World Chess Championship, breaking the previous age record of 22 set by Garry Kasparov by becoming champion at 18 years, 195 days old.
- December 14
  - 2024 Georgian presidential election: Mikheil Kavelashvili of People's Power is elected unopposed.
  - South Korean President Yoon Suk Yeol's powers and duties are suspended after MPs vote to impeach him, following his martial law declaration the previous week.
  - Cyclone Chido makes landfall in Mayotte, causing at least 172 deaths and bringing devastating damage to the island.
- December 17 – The capital of Vanuatu, Port Vila, suffers extensive damage after a M_{w} 7.3 earthquake. At least 16 people are killed.
- December 19:
  - The Hungarian government of Viktor Orbán has granted political asylum to Polish MP of Law and Justice Marcin Romanowski, who is wanted on the European Arrest Warrant for being accused of defrauding 100 million zł from the Fundusz Sprawiedliwości (Justice Fund) when he was deputy minister of justice during the PiS government.
  - Mazan rapes trial: The Judicial Court in Avignon, France, finds Dominique Pelicot guilty of the aggravated rape of his ex-wife Gisèle Pelicot and imposes the maximum sentence of 20 years in prison. The 50 other defendants in the case are also convicted of crimes ranging from attempted rape to aggravated rape, and receive prison sentences ranging from three to 15 years.
- December 20 – Six people are killed, while over 300 are injured, after a car is driven into a crowd at a Christmas market in Magdeburg, Germany.

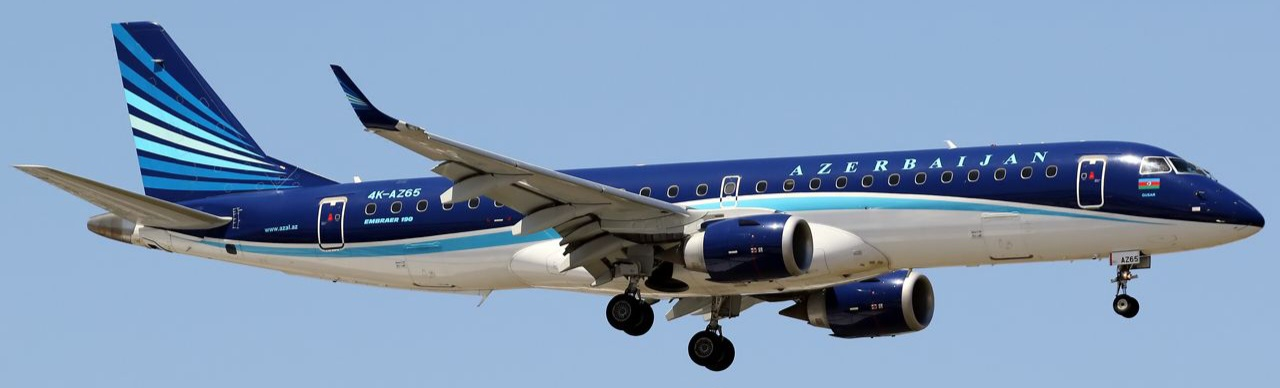
Azerbaijan Airlines Flight 8243 crashes near Aktau International Airport, Kazakhstan, on December 25

- December 21 – Thirty-nine people died and another seven are injured after a multiple-vehicle collision occurs on the BR-116 highway in Teófilo Otoni, Minas Gerais, Brazil. It is the deadliest traffic accident on federal highways in Brazil since 2007, when numbers were first monitored.
- December 24
  - The 2025 Jubilee in the Catholic Church begins.
  - The Parker Solar Probe breaks the previous record set in 2018 for the closest artificial object to the Sun by 6.1 million kilometers (3.8 million miles), becoming the closest and first man-made object to approach and "touch" the Sun.
- December 25 – Azerbaijan Airlines Flight 8243, an Embraer ERJ-190AR, crashes in Kazakhstan. Twenty-nine out of the 67 on board survive the crash.
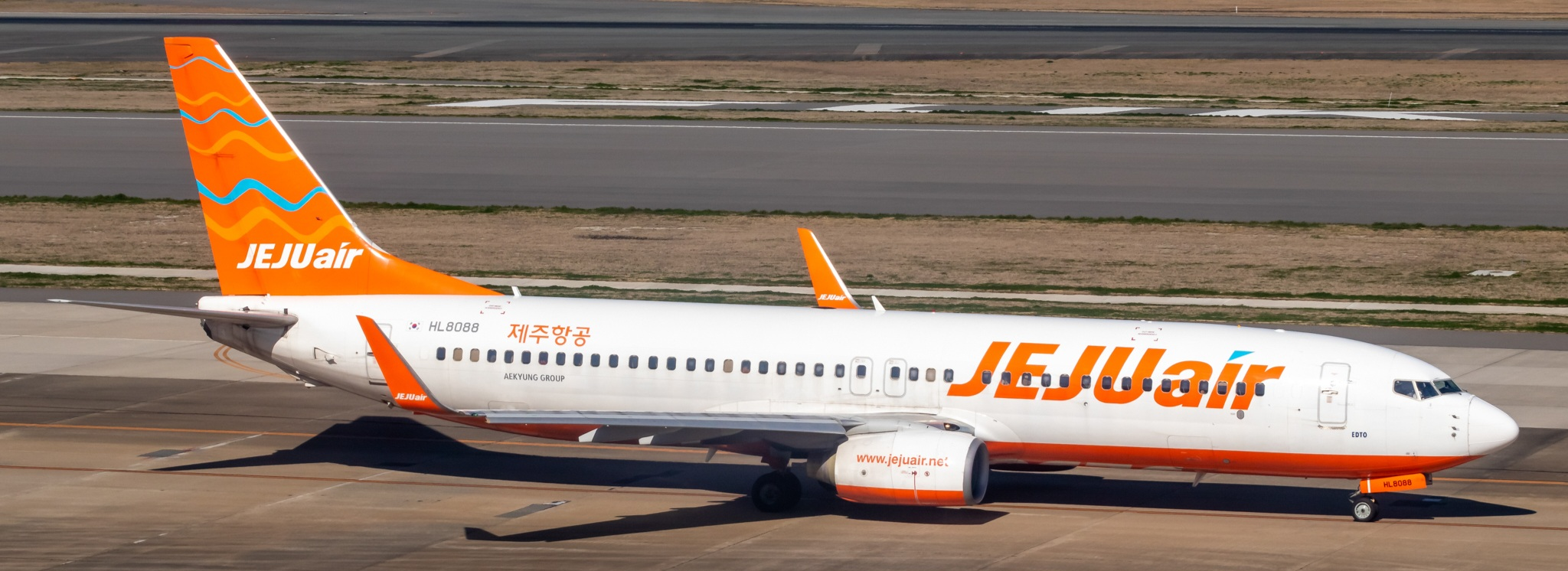
  Jeju Air Flight 2216 crashes at Muan International Airport, South Korea on December 29
- December 27 – Acting President of South Korea Han Duck-soo is impeached by MPs for failing to promulgate two bills related to president Yoon's legal proceedings. He is succeeded by deputy prime minister Choi Sang-mok.
- December 29
  - Jeju Air Flight 2216, a Boeing 737-800 passenger flight from Bangkok Suvarnabhumi Airport in Bangkok, Thailand, to Muan International Airport in Muan, South Korea, veers off the runway at Muan International Airport and crashes into a barrier, killing 179 people. Two injured survivors are reported.
  - A truck carrying passengers falls off a bridge over the Ganale Doria River in Bona Zuria, Sidama Region, Ethiopia, killing 71 people and injuring 4 others.

== Nobel Prizes ==
Nobel medal

- Chemistry – David Baker, for computational protein design, and Demis Hassabis and John M. Jumper, for protein structure prediction.
- Economics – Daron Acemoglu, Simon Johnson and James A. Robinson, for studies of how institutions are formed and affect prosperity.
- Literature – Han Kang, for her intense poetic prose that confronts historical traumas and exposes the fragility of human life.
- Peace – Nihon Hidankyo, for its efforts to achieve a world free of nuclear weapons and for demonstrating through witness testimony that nuclear weapons must never be used again.
- Physics – John J. Hopfield and Geoffrey E. Hinton, for their foundational discoveries and inventions that enable machine learning with artificial neural networks.
- Physiology or Medicine – Victor Ambros and Gary Ruvkun, for their discovery of microRNA and its role in post-transcriptional gene regulation.
