= 2024 Bolivian coup attempt =

Failed military coup in Bolivia

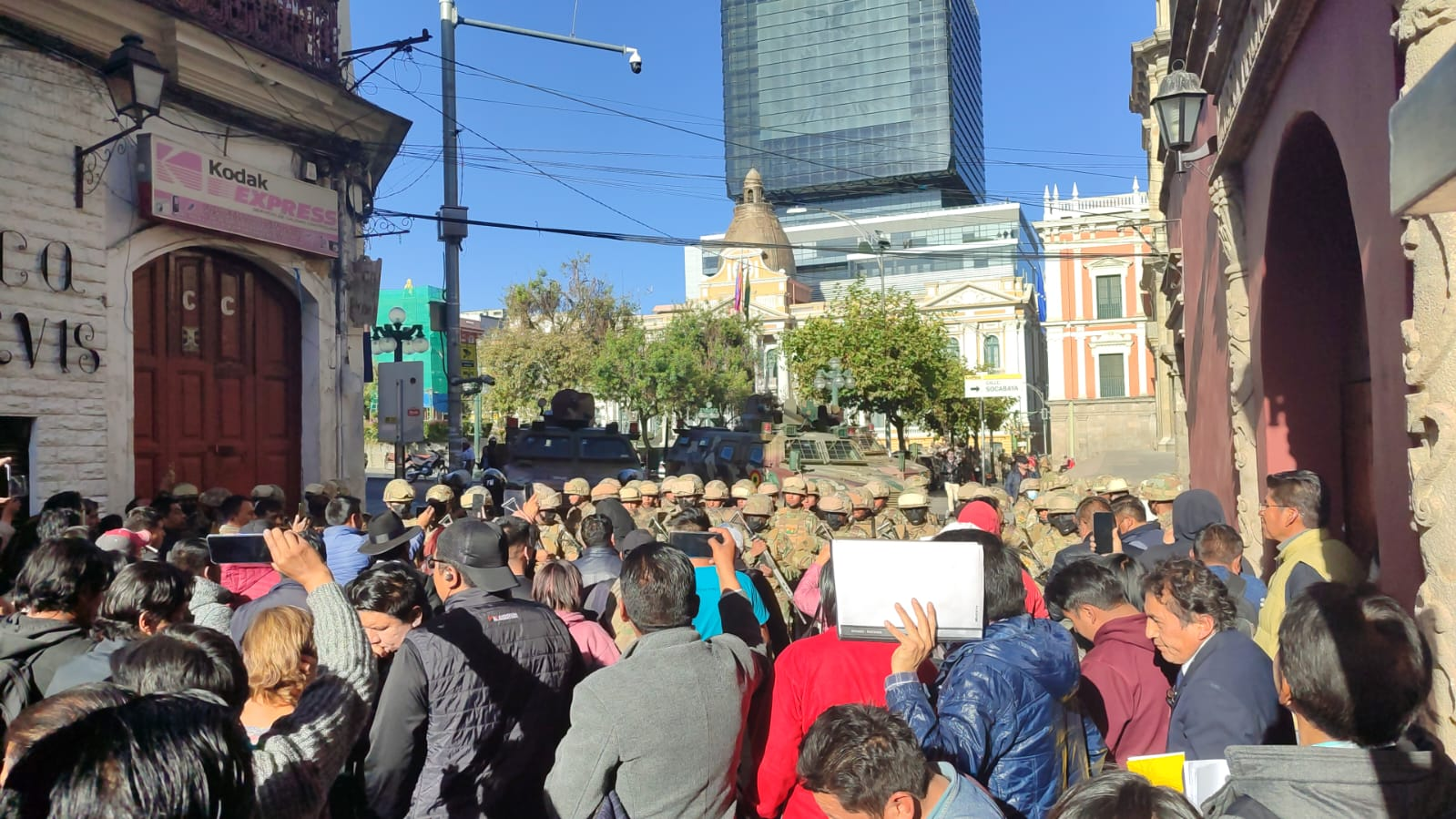
- Protesters confront soldiers outside the Plaza Murillo
Date	26 June 2024
Location	Plaza Murillo, La Paz, Bolivia
Result	Coup failed: New military command appointed; Soldiers withdraw to barracks; Perpetrators apprehended

Belligerents
Government of Bolivia; Movement for Socialism; Bolivian National Police; Bolivian Workers' Center; Anti-coup protesters	Armed Forces of Bolivia; Bolivian Army; Bolivian Navy; Bolivian Air Force

Commanders and leaders
Luis Arce; David Choquehuanca; Edmundo Novillo; Evo Morales	Juan José Zúñiga; Juan Arnez; Marcelo Zegarra

Casualties and losses
None	21 officers detained
- 12 civilians injured

On 26 June 2024, an attempted military coup occurred in Bolivia, orchestrated by dissident officers of the Armed Forces led by General Juan José Zúñiga. Armed troops occupied the Plaza Murillo in La Paz, the political heart of the country, but withdrew amid domestic and international pressure and after the appointment of a new military high command.

The coup followed weeks of political and economic unease, as a split in the ruling party between former president Evo Morales and incumbent Luis Arce hampered the government's ability to address a looming financial crisis. Days before the coup, General Juan José Zúñiga declared that the military would arrest Morales if he ran in the 2025 presidential election. The resulting scandal ended in Zúñiga's dismissal.

Early on 26 June, Bolivian Army units began irregular mobilizations, culminating by mid-afternoon in the complete occupation of Plaza Murillo. A tense standoff between soldiers and police joined by protesters lasted for three hours. The day's events included an assault on the historical Palacio Quemado and a face-to-face altercation between Arce and Zúñiga. The coup plotters lacked meaningful military or political support and were met with bipartisan domestic and international condemnation. Police forces opposed the putsch, and the commander of the Air Force backed out before a new Army commander appointed by Arce ordered all soldiers to return to their regular posts.

Following his arrest, Zúñiga asserted that the coup attempt had been a ruse masterminded by Arce to drum up popular support. Opponents of the government seized on the accusation, with supporters of Morales, and the traditional opposition, questioning the administration's role in the military uprising. Arce has categorically denied all accusations of a self-coup.

== Background ==
Bolivia marked its transition to democracy in 1982 when the Armed Forces ceded power to a civilian-led government elected two years prior. Despite continued economic turmoil and political instability, the return to civilian rule mostly closed the cycle of volatility that caused the country to experience a multitude of attempted and successful revolutions and coups d'état in the two centuries since independence. By 2024, Bolivia had not faced a coordinated military attempt to seize power in forty-odd years; the last such venture occurred in 1984 but was unsuccessful.

Antecedents to the most recent crisis stem back to 2019, when the then-president, leftist leader Evo Morales, sought reelection to a controversial fourth term in office. Morales's narrow victory in that year's general election was beset by allegations of fraud, sparking mass protests that prompted his resignation and the installation of an interim government – an event Morales's party, the Movement for Socialism (MAS), deemed a coup d'état. A re-run of the election in 2020 saw Luis Arce, Morales's chosen successor and former finance minister, win the presidency, returning the MAS to power.

In the years after assuming office, a widening rift emerged between Arce and Morales over dueling presidential ambitions. The growing schism culminated in 2023, with Arce's expulsion from the MAS party and Morales's announcement of his candidacy in the 2025 presidential election – even as the Constitutional Tribunal struck down a previous ruling enabling him to run indefinitely. By the start of 2024, the MAS had splintered into opposing factions loyal to either Arce or Morales. The charged political atmosphere was compounded by a growing economic crisis, with gridlock in parliament crippling the government's ability to manage Bolivia's financial woes. Amid a faltering approval rating, roadblocks led by Morales supporters, and rising economic protests from outside labor groups, Arce called on the Armed Forces to defend him from "sinister plans that seek a soft coup or to shorten [his] term".

== Coup attempt ==
=== Prelude and early maneuvering ===
Two days before the coup, on the night of 24 June, General Juan José Zúñiga, the commanding general of the Army, declared on the PAT network that if Morales attempted to run for president again, the Armed Forces would seek to arrest him. "That man cannot be president of this country again", Zúñiga affirmed. "If the case warrants it, I think that yes [we would arrest him]". The general's comments provoked a wave of criticism from supporters of Morales and the opposition, and by the next day, sources consulted by El Deber claimed that Zúñiga had been relieved of command. He denied that narrative, however, stating to radio ERBOL that he was "still the commander [of the Army]" and that rumors of his dismissal were untrue.

By the morning of 26 June, the situation surrounding Zúñiga's apparent removal remained unclear, with the general participating in an official military event, where he granted ranks to new members of the Army Intelligence Branch. According to Defense Minister Edmundo Novillo, Zúñiga had indeed been sacked the night prior, in a private meeting described as "most friendly [and] with hugs". By 11:00 a.m. BOT, however, unofficial reports indicated a level of discontent within the Armed Forces over the fact that Zúñiga had still not tendered his official resignation to the president, and sometime thereafter, he was summoned to government headquarters to be formally relieved of his post.

Around 9:00 a.m., reports began trickling into the Ministry of Defense of troops being mobilized in six trucks, which Novillo thought was "not normal". At twelve noon, he called to inform Arce that Zúñiga could not be contacted and that several military units were approaching La Paz. The president, who was at an event in El Alto, made his return to the Casa Grande del Pueblo – the presidential palace – where he met with Vice President David Choquehuanca and convened his cabinet.

=== Capture of the Plaza Murillo ===
Finally, at about half past two in the afternoon, armed troops began seizing control of Plaza Murillo, the political center of Bolivia, where both the executive and legislative branches are headquartered. They were followed by a contingent of military vehicles. María Nela Prada, minister of the presidency, recalled that Arce learned of the uprising when he inquired about sirens outside. "I go to the window and see military tanks taking over [the plaza]", she said. Below, Eduardo del Castillo, minister of government, emerged from the palace to confront a vehicle parked at the gate. "Demobilize now!", he shouted as he banged on the car window. He then returned inside and informed the president that Zúñiga was in one of the cars.

From social media, Arce quickly denounced the "irregular mobilizations" and urged that democracy be respected. Around the same time, he also contacted Morales to warn him of the coup d'état underway. Morales later stated the president "was nervous" during their two-minute conversation and claimed that he confronted Arce for both promoting Zúñiga and not removing him earlier. Later on, Morales also took to social media to mobilize supporters against the coup.

As the coup unfolded, Zúñiga arrived on the scene and began directing comments to reporters. "The three chiefs of the Armed Forces have come to express our dismay", he declared. Flanked by soldiers, the general assured that the military would "restore democracy" and insisted that their actions had popular support. "We are listening to the cry of the people", he affirmed, "look at what situation we are in, what crisis [the elite] have left us in". Zúñiga went on to state that he would continue to recognize Arce as president "for now" but that there needed to be a new cabinet of ministers and the release of political prisoners. Minutes later, at 3:49 p.m., an armored vehicle rammed the façade of the Palacio Quemado – the historical palace of government – destroying the main gate. Masked soldiers led by Zúñiga proceeded to storm the entrance while yet more troops closed off the perimeter.

External videos
- Arce confronts Zúñiga
- "In an extraordinary scene that would not have been out of place in a telenovela, President Arce faced down the leader of the so-called coup plot".
- Discusión acalorada entre el presidente Luis Arce y el general Juan José Zúñiga

In a tense exchange inside the building, Arce confronted Zúñiga face-to-face, demanding the military return to its barracks: "... you are carrying out a coup against the Bolivian people! I will not allow it! If you respect yourself as a soldier, withdraw all your forces. It's an order!". Amid shouting, Arce asked if Zúñiga was "going to listen to [him]?". The general – surrounded by soldiers and flanked by the heads of the Air Force and Navy, Marcelo Zegarra and Juan Arnez – replied with a stern, "no". Arce then directed the same question to the other two commanding officers. Arnez echoed, "no", but Zegarra said, "yes". Footage of the event displayed Zúñiga leaving the building shortly thereafter.

Zúñiga emerged from the Palacio Quemado shortly after 4:00 p.m. "We are withdrawing", he stated before boarding an idling vehicle, which transported him out of the plaza. Nonetheless, the siege remained in place as soldiers faced down law enforcement who attempted to dislodge them using tear gas. The police corps hadn't joined the uprising; although Police Chief Alvaro Álvarez was informed of the coup plot by its commanders, he had declined to participate. The coup, by now, had started to stall, a fact Zúñiga later attributed to the delay of units arriving from Viacha and the lack of Air Force support.

=== Resolution and military withdrawal ===
Back inside the palace, the only commander yet remaining was Zegarra, who – depending on the narrative – either faltered at the last minute or was unaware of the military's ultimate objective from the start. Zegarra accompanied Arce back to the Casa Grande, where they held a short meeting. "I insisted that he reflect [on] the consequences that could come", the president recounted. Minutes later, Arce released a short video from his office, where he urged the populace to "mobilize against the coup d'état". By that point, the Bolivian Workers' Center – the largest trade union in the country – had declared an indefinite nationwide general strike and called on labor groups to march on La Paz in defense of the government. Around the same time, the crowd of protesters already forming outside the plaza was repressed by tear gas fire, leaving at least twelve injured.

As chaos reigned on the streets outside, the president hastily convened a ceremony to appoint new chiefs of the three armed forces. "Over the booming of tear gas being fired at pro-democracy protesters", Arce swore in José Wilson Sánchez, Renán Ramírez, and Gerardo Zavala as heads of the Army, Navy, and Air Force, respectively. The commanding officer of the Armed Forces, Gonzalo Vigabriel, was implicitly ratified in his position, having remained loyal throughout the coup. Sánchez then took to the stand and ordered all mobilized units to return to their barracks. Armored vehicles occupying the plaza pulled out within minutes, followed by several hundred soldiers. Police in riot gear quickly moved to cordon off the area around the palace. "Almost as suddenly as they had arrived, the soldiers left", said The Economist. In all, the botched putsch lasted around three hours.

As the military threat subsided, crowds of supporters filled the plaza square in celebration, singing and waving flags. From the balcony of the Casa Grande, Arce addressed cheering supporters, saying "the only ones who can remove us from here are you" and shouting "Long live democracy".

== Reactions ==
=== Domestic ===
Former presidents Carlos Mesa and Jorge Quiroga condemned the coup, stressing that the government could only be removed through the ballot box. Despite Zúñiga's overtures towards the release of political prisoners, both Jeanine Áñez and Luis Fernando Camacho – each incarcerated for their roles in the 2019 crisis – also repudiated the military's actions. Journalist Angus McNelly reported that "everyone was apparently against Zúñiga".

=== International ===
The coup was met with swift international condemnation, with heads of state of several neighboring Latin American states – including Brazil, Chile, Colombia, Cuba, Mexico, Paraguay, and Venezuela, among others – expressing support for and solidarity with the incumbent democratic government. The government of Russia and the Prime Minister of Spain, Pedro Sánchez, also condemned the coup. The European Union, as well as other international organizations, such as the Community of Latin American and Caribbean States and the Organization of American States (OAS), expressed concern over the ongoing state of affairs, while the United States stated that it was "closely monitoring the situation". In contrast, the government of Javier Milei in Argentina denied the coup's authenticity and endorsed the narrative of a "fraudulent" self-coup. In response, Bolivia recalled its ambassador in Buenos Aires for consultation and summoned the Argentine ambassador. The OAS met for its annual General Assembly the day after the coup, where it issued a unanimous resolution expressing "serious concern" over the previous day's events. The document denounced the coup plotters for their "flagrant insubordination", stating that the military uprising "constitute[d] a threat to the constitutional regime of the Plurinational State of Bolivia". Héctor Arce, the Bolivian ambassador to the organization, thanked the body for its support, adding that "strong international condemnation" was one reason the coup ultimately failed. The United States stated that it had no involvement in the coup.

== Aftermath ==
On the evening of 26 June, Bolivian police arrested Zúñiga. The public prosecutor's office announced it would criminally investigate the coup plotters.

Following his arrest, Zúñiga claimed that on 23 June, he met with Luis Arce, who allegedly ordered him to deploy tanks in the streets for an attempted self-coup, stating it was necessary to boost his popularity. After making these statements, Zúñiga was taken to the offices of the Special Force to Fight Crime (FELCC) in La Paz. Later, he was presented to the press as a criminal. Minister of Government Eduardo Del Castillo presented a report describing the events as a failed coup. Arce also described allegations of a self-coup as lies and said that retired military personnel and civil society figures were also involved in the coup attempt, later adding that Zúñiga was planning to install himself as president.

Vice Admiral Juan Arnez Salvador, former Commander General of the Armed Forces, was also detained. Zúñiga and Arnez face charges including armed uprising, assault against the president, destruction of public property, and other crimes.

On 27 June, authorities presented 17 individuals accused of involvement in the coup, adding they had begun planning the attempt in May. One of the suspects, Aníbal Aguilar Gómez, a civilian described as a key ideologue, denied the charges and went on a hunger strike. He also attempted to implicate Chile in the matter. At least 30 suspects were arrested in relation to the coup. On 28 June, Zúñiga, Arnez, and Alejandro Irahola, the former head of the army's mechanized brigade, were placed under a six-month pre-trial detention in the Chonchocoro maximum-security prison outside La Paz.

President Luis Arce condemned the coup and called for public support, while former President Evo Morales demanded criminal charges against the coup plotters. Allies swiftly condemned the coup, and concerns arose about potential crackdowns on political opponents.

On 30 June, Morales denounced Arce, alleging that it was a self-coup to boost his popularity. He also apologised for expressing support for Arce during the coup, and called for an independent investigation. In response, María Nela Prada told him to not "become a puppet, a marionette and an instrument of imperialism".

== See also ==
- 1984 Bolivian coup attempt
- 2019 Bolivian political crisis
