= José Wilson Sánchez =

Bolivian military officer

Commanding General of the Bolivian Army
- Incumbent
- Assumed office 26 June 2024
- President: Luis Arce
- Preceded by: Juan José Zúñiga

Military service
- Allegiance: Bolivia
- Branch/service: Bolivian Army
- Rank: General

José Wilson Sánchez is a Bolivian military officer who currently serves as the army chief and the commanding general (Spanish: General de Ejército) of the Bolivian Army since the failed coup attempt of 26 June 2024.

== 2024 coup attempt ==
On 26 June 2024, General Juan José Zúñiga, the commander of the Bolivian Army, attempted a coup d'état of President Luis Arce, by sending troops in armoured vehicles to seize the Plaza Murillo in La Paz, the country's administrative capital, and storm the Casa Grande del Pueblo, the presidential palace.

During the coup attempt, Arce appointed new heads of the Bolivian Army, Navy, and Air Force while stating that the troops that rose up against him were "staining the uniform". Arce appointed Sánchez as the new army chief and the commanding general. In his first act, Sánchez ordered all troops taking part in the coup to stand down and return to their barracks. Troops quickly evacuated the plaza following the order.
