= Kojak (disambiguation) =

Kojak may refer to:

- Kojak, a 1973–1978 American crime drama TV series
- Kojak (2005 TV series), an American television series and remake of the original 1973 series
- Papa Kojak (1959–2024), a Jamaican deejay, also known as "Kojak" or "Nigger Kojak"
- Kojak (vehicle), a Bolivian military dune-buggy
- Mal Kirk, English professional wrestler billed as Kojak Kirk in the 1970s

== See also ==
- Kojaque (born 1995), Irish rapper
