= Armed Forces of Bolivia =

Combined military forces of Bolivia

- Fuerzas Armadas de Bolivia
- Motto: Subordinacion y Constancia, ¡Viva Bolivia! (Subordination and Steadfastness. Long Live Bolivia!)
- Founded: 7 August 1826; 200 years ago
- Service branches: Bolivian Army; Bolivian Navy; Bolivian Air Force

Leadership
- Captain General of the Armed Forces: Rodrigo Paz (President of Bolivia)
- Minister of Defense: Ernesto Justiniano
- Commander in Chief of the Armed Forces: César Moisés Vallejos Rocha

Personnel
- Military age: 18
- Active personnel: 40.000 to 70.000 (est.)
- Reserve personnel: 40.000 (est.)

Expenditure
- Budget: $659.2 million (2017)
- Percent of GDP: 1.76% (2017)

Industry
- Foreign suppliers: Argentina; Austria; Brazil; China; Mexico; Peru; Russia; Turkey; United States; European Union; France; Switzerland; United Kingdom Historical: Israel

Related articles
- Ranks: Military ranks of Bolivia

The Bolivian Armed Forces (Spanish: Fuerzas Armadas de Bolivia) are the military of Bolivia. The Armed Forces of Bolivia are responsible for the defense, both of external and internal, of Bolivia, and they are constituted by the Bolivian Army, the Bolivian Air Force, and the Bolivian Navy. All these institutions are under the Ministry of Defense of Bolivia.

In addition to the Bolivian Army, the Bolivian Air Force and the Bolivian Navy, the Bolivian National Police, although dependent on the Ministry of Government in times of peace, is part of the reserves of the Armed Forces according to the Organic Law of the Armed Forces of this nation, together with other reserve bodies such as the SAR-FAB emergency and rescue units.

Figures on the size and composition of the armed forces of Bolivia vary considerably, with rare official data available. It is estimated, however, that the three main forces (army, navy, and air force) add up to a total of between 40,000 to 70,000 troops, while the Bolivian police would be around 40,000 troops.

== High Command of the Armed Forces of Bolivia ==
The roles and tenure of the High Command are described in the Organic Law of the Armed Forces (LOFA) which states that the hierarchy is subordinate to and appointed by the President of Bolivia, with the Minister of Defense acting as an intermediary between the President and the Armed Forces. Article 172 of the 2009 Constitution states that amongst the President's duties are "to designate and substitute the Commander in Chief of the Armed Forces and the Commanders of the Army, the Air Force, and the Navy."

The current positions, appointed by interim president Jeanine Áñez Chávez on 13 Nov 2019 are as follows:

- Commander in Chief of the Armed Forces: Gen. Carlos Orellana Centellas
- Military Chief of Staff: Pablo Arturo Guerra Camacho
- Commander of the Army: Gen. Iván Patricio Inchauste
- Commander of the Air Force: Ciro Orlando Álvarez Guzmán
- Commander of the Navy: Rear Admiral Moisés Orlando Mejía Heredia

Article 100 of the LOFA also states that these positions, and several others such as Chief of Police and Head of the Presidential, may be held "only once during the military career and for a time no greater than two years". This results in a fairly high turnover in the Bolivian High Command ,with continued service being prohibited by law. The last changes in High Command, under the previous President Evo Morales, occurred on 24 Dec 2018, 11 Dec 2017, 29 Dec 2016, 30 Dec 2015, 18 Dec 2014, 13 Dec 2013 and 3 Dec 2012.

Attempts to increase the maximum length of service for members of the High Command (and other positions) were made, unsuccessfully, under the Morales administration who wished to increase it to between 3 and 5 years.

=== Commander in Chief of the Armed Forces ===
No.	Portrait	Name (birth–death)	Term of office			Defence branch	Ref.
No.	Portrait	Name (birth–death)	Took office	Left office	Time in office	Defence branch	Ref.
		General; Víctor Guzmán Bruno	14 August 1991	20 August 1992	1 year, 6 days	Bolivian Air Force	
		General; Oscar Vargas Lorenzetti	20 August 1992	15 December 1994	2 years, 117 days	Bolivian Army	
		General; Reynaldo Cáceres Quiroga	15 December 1994	1 November 1996	1 year, 322 days	Bolivian Army	
		General; Hernán Aguilera Bianchi	1 November 1996	14 November 1998	2 years, 13 days	Bolivian Army	
		Admiral; Jorge Zabala Ossio	14 November 1998	24 November 2000	2 years, 10 days	Bolivian Navy	
		General; Alvin Anaya Kippes	24 November 2000	8 August 2002	1 year, 257 days	Bolivian Army	
		Divisional general Roberto Claros Flores; Acting	8 August 2002	24 November 2003	1 year, 108 days	Bolivian Air Force	
		Admiral; Luis Alberto Aranda Granados	24 November 2003	14 June 2005	1 year, 202 days	Bolivian Navy	
		Admiral; Marco Antonio Justiniano Escalante	14 June 2005	24 January 2006	224 days	Bolivian Navy	
		Admiral; José Luis Cabás Villegas; Acting	5 January 2009	24 January 2010	1 year, 19 days	Bolivian Navy	
		General; Carlos Ramiro de La Fuente Bloch	24 January 2010	22 March 2011	1 year, 57 days	Bolivian Army	
		Admiral; Armando Pacheco Gutiérrez	22 March 2011	5 January 2012	289 days	Bolivian Navy	
		General; Tito Roger Gandarillas	5 January 2012	3 December 2012	333 days	Bolivian Air Force	
		General; Edwin de la Fuente	3 December 2012	14 December 2013	1 year, 11 days	Bolivian Army	
		Admiral; Víctor Baldivieso Haché	14 December 2013	22 December 2014	1 year, 8 days	Bolivian Navy	
		General; Omar Jaime Salinas Ortuño	22 December 2014	30 December 2015	1 year, 8 days	Bolivian Army	
		General; Juan Gonzalo Durán Flores	30 December 2015	29 December 2016	365 days	Bolivian Air Force	
		General; Luis Orlando Ariñez Bazán	29 December 2016	11 December 2017	347 days	Bolivian Army	
		Admiral; Yamil Octavio Borda Sosa	11 December 2017	24 November 2018	348 days	Bolivian Navy	
		General; Williams Kaliman (born 1963)	24 November 2018	13 November 2019	354 days	Bolivian Army	
		General; Carlos Orellana Centellas	13 November 2019	29 December 2020	1 year, 46 days	Bolivian Army	
		General; César Moisés Vallejos Rocha	29 December 2020	2021	340 days	Bolivian Air Force	
		General; Víctor Hugo Balderrama Quezada	13 November 2025	Incumbent	336 days	Bolivian Army	

== Army ==
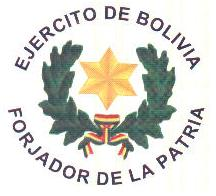
Coat of Arms of the Bolivian Army

The Bolivian Army (Ejército de Bolivia, EB) is the land branch of the armed forces of Bolivia. Together with the Bolivia army and air force, Bolivia is responsible for protecting Bolivia from internal and external threats and ensuring the independence of this country. The Bolivian Army has around 55,500 men. There are six military regions (regiones militares—RMs) in the army. The Army is organized into ten divisions. The Army maintains a small fleet of utility aircraft, primarily to support headquarters.

=== Combat units directly under the Army general command ===
- 1st Infantry Regiment Colorados (Presidential Guard) contains two battalions: BI-201 and BI-202
- BATCOM-251,
- Gen. maintenance cen. no. 1
- Transport batt. no. 1.
- 1st National parks Security Regiment

==== Special forces command ====
The Special Forces command controls the following units:

- 12th Ranger Regt. "MANCHEGO", Montero
- 16th Infantry Regt. JORDAN, Riberalta (Special Forces)
- 18th Parachute Infantry Regiment VICTORIA "Army Special Troops Training Center", Cochabamba
- 24th Ranger Regiment (Mountain) MÉNDEZ ARCOS, Challapata

==== Army aviation command ====
Army aviation company 291 (La Paz), Army Aviation Company 292 (Santa Cruz)

- 291st Cavalry Group (La Paz)

=== Regional ===
The Bolivian Army has six military regions (regiones militares—RMs) covering the various departments of Bolivia:

- RM 1, La Paz, most of La Paz Department: 1st Army Division, 297th MPB C.L.Saavedra (Military Police battalion), BE-296 CNL R.C.Zabalegui (ecological batt.), BE-297 (ecolog. batt.), BATLOG-1 (Logistics btn.), army aviation company 291 C.L.Cordoba, Mili. hospital no. 1, Military Police School, Army Equestrian Center, Military College of Bolivia "COL Gustavo Villaroel Lopez", Army School of Intelligence, Army Engineers School MCAL Antonio Jose de Sucre, Army Signals and Communications School, Army Armor School, Army 1st Engineering Regiment CPN Felipe Ochoa "Army Engineering and Maintenance Center", Bolivian Army Military School of Music "LTCOL Antonio Patino", 2nd Armored Cavalry Regiment "Tarapaca"
- RM 2, Potosí, covering the departments of Oruro and Potosi: 2nd and 10th ADs, 24th RR M.Arcos (ranger regt.), ADA-202 (a.a. group), Army Mountain School
- RM 3, Tarija, consisting of Tarija Department and eastern Chuquisaca and southern Santa Cruz:3rd and 4th AD
- RM 4, Sucre, covering the departments of Cochabamba and northern Chuquisaca: 7th Army Division, 272nd MP Btn., BATLOG-2 (long.Batt), mili.hospital no2, Army Arsensals Cochabamba, Army Command and Staff College MSHL Antonio de Santa Cruz, Army NCO School "SGT M. Paredez", Army Artillery School, 18th PIR "Victoria" (Army Special Troops Training Center), Army NCOs and Warrant Officers Advance Studies Institute, Army Arms Applications School, 1LT Edmundo Andrade Military High School
- RM 5, Cobija, encompassing the Pando Department and parts of La Paz and Beni departments: 6th AD, 16th IR Jordan (special forces), Army Jungle Operations School
- RM 6, Santa Cruz, covering most of Santa Cruz Department: 5th and 8th ADs, BMP-273 R.Amezaga (Military Police), BE-298 (ecological batt.), 12th RR Manchego (ranger), BATLOG-3 (logist. batt.), 292 army aviation company, Bolivian Condores school (special forces), 6th IR

=== Army divisions ===
The army is organized into ten territorial divisions plus a mechanized division, each of which, with the exception of Viacha, occupy a region generally corresponding to the administrative departments, with some overlapping. These and their respective divisional headquarters and constituent units are:

- 1st Mechanized Division, Viacha (La Paz Department): 1st Field Artillery Regiment "Camacho", 6th Air Defense Artillery Regiment, 23rd IR (Mechanized Infantry Training), 4th IR Tarapaca (Mech.) 5th ACR, 2nd ACR (Training), 1st Armor Regiment
- 1st AD, Viacha (La Paz Department): 8th IR Ayacucho, RI 30 Murillo (mountain), RA 2 Bolivar, Bat.Ing. 2 G.F.Roman.
- 2nd AD, Oruro: 21st IR Illimani (Mountain), RI 22 Mejillones, 25th RI (Mountain) Tocopilla, RC 8 Braun, 1st Artillery Regt. Camacho, Bat.Ing. 7 Sajama.
- 3rd AD, Villamontes (Tarija Department): 5th IR Campero, RI 20 Padilla, RC 3 Aroma, RA 3 Pisagua, Bat.Ing. 1 Chorolque.
- 4th AD, Camiri (Santa Cruz Department):, 6th Infantry Regiment Campos, RI 11 Boqueron, 1st Cavalry Regt. "E. Avaroa", RA 4 Bullian
- 5th AD, Roboré (Santa Cruz Department): RI 13 Montes, RI 14 Florida, RI 15 Junin, RC 6 Castrillo, RA 5 Vergara
- 6th AD, Trinidad: RI 17 Indepedencia, RI 29 Echevarria, RI 31 Rios, RI 32 Murguia, 2nd Cavalry Regt. Ballivan, 8th AR Mendez(reserve), Bat.Ing. 6 Riosinho.
- 7th Army Division, Cochabamba (the largest):, 2nd Infantry Regiment "Marshal Antonio Jose de Sucre", 18th Parachute Infantry Regiment "Victoria" (Army Special Troops Training Center), RI 26 R.Barrientos (mech.) 29th PIR "CPT V.Ustariz" (airborne), RA 7 Tumusia, Bat.Ing.5 T.N.Ovando
- 8th AD, Santa Cruz: RI 7 Marzana, RI 10 Warnes (mech.), RC 10 G.M.J.M. Mercado, RA 9 Mitre (reserve), Bat.Ing. 3 Pando.
- 9th AD (Reserve), Rurrenabaque: the Division has been reduced to reserve status and its component units have been divided up between DE-1 and DE-6
- 10th AD, Tupiz: 3rd IR "Juan Jose Perez", RI 4 Loa, RI 27 Antofagasta, 7th ACR Chichas (Armored Cavalry), RA 12 Ayohuma (reserve)

RI: infantry regiment RC: cavalry regiment RA: artillery regiment Bat.Ing.: battalion engineer

Army organized has ten divisions controlling the following units:

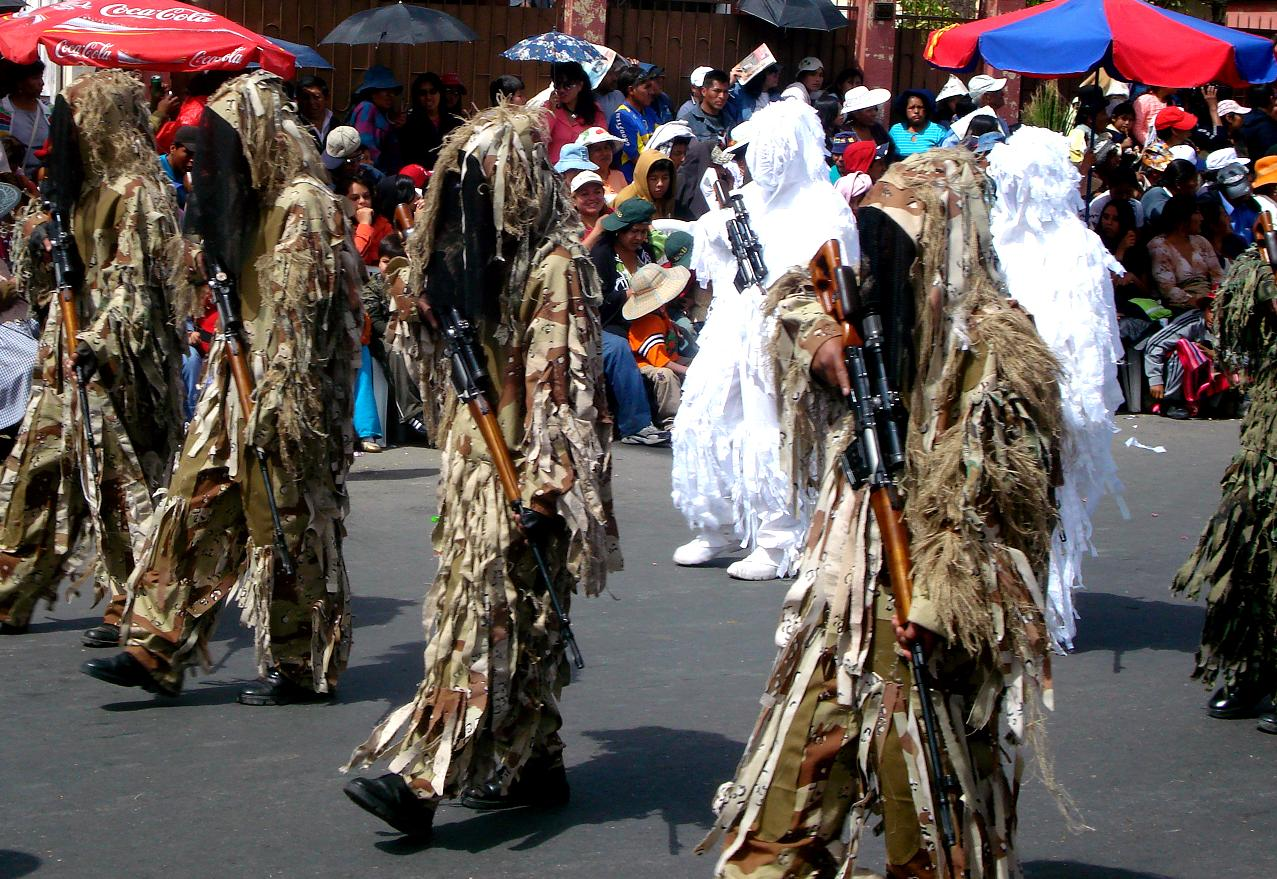
Bolivian Snipers Dragunov SVD.

- eight cavalry regiments, included two mechanized regiments
- twenty-three infantry regiments included two airborne and two mountain
- one recce. mechanized regiments and one armored regiments
- two ranger regiments
- one special forces regiments
- six and three reserve artillery regiments
- one artillery and antiaircraft group
- one artillery and antiaircraft Regiment
- three military police battalions
- three ecological battalions
- two army aviation companies
- six engineer battalions
- Plus logistical and instructional support commands
- Presidential Guard (Colorado) infantry battalion under direct control of the army headquarters in La Paz's Miraflores district

The Army maintains a small fleet of utility aircraft, primarily to support headquarters.

=== Equipment of the Army ===
==== Land equipment ====
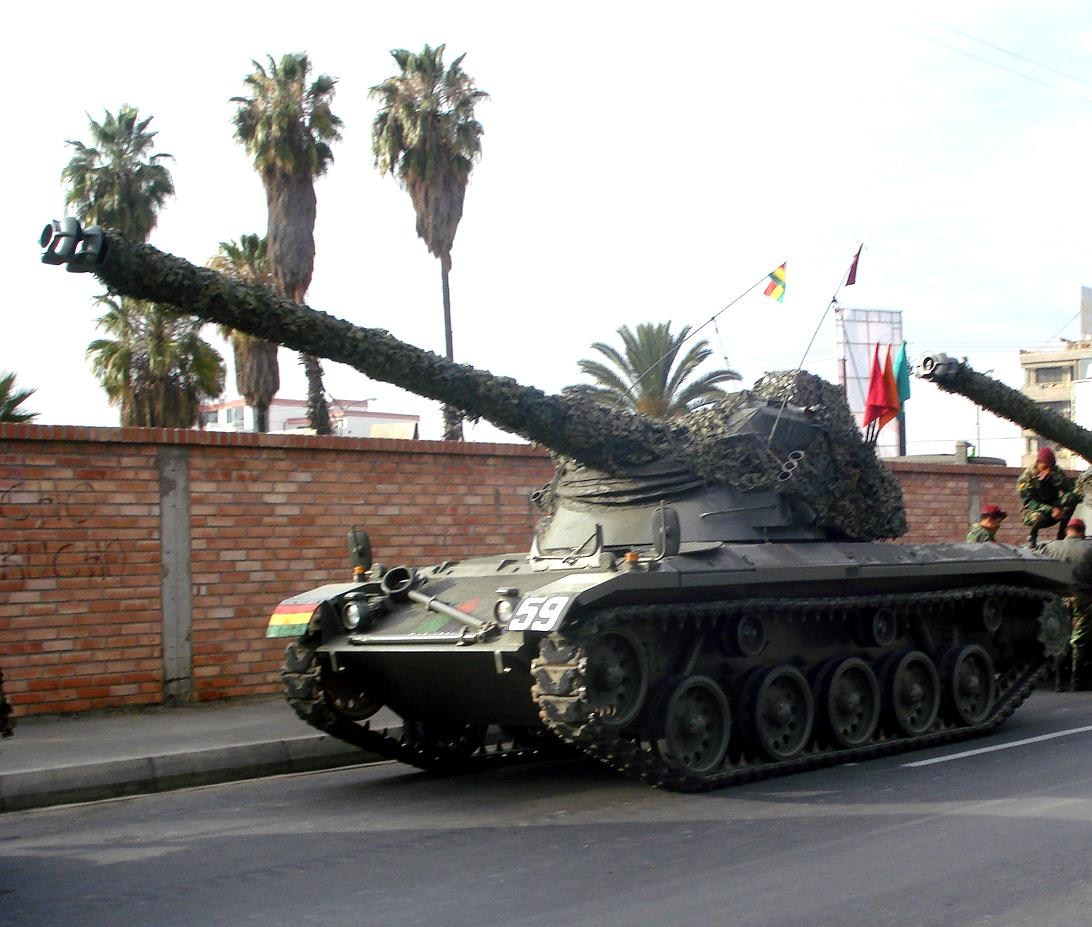
SK105 Kürassier Tank of Bolivia.

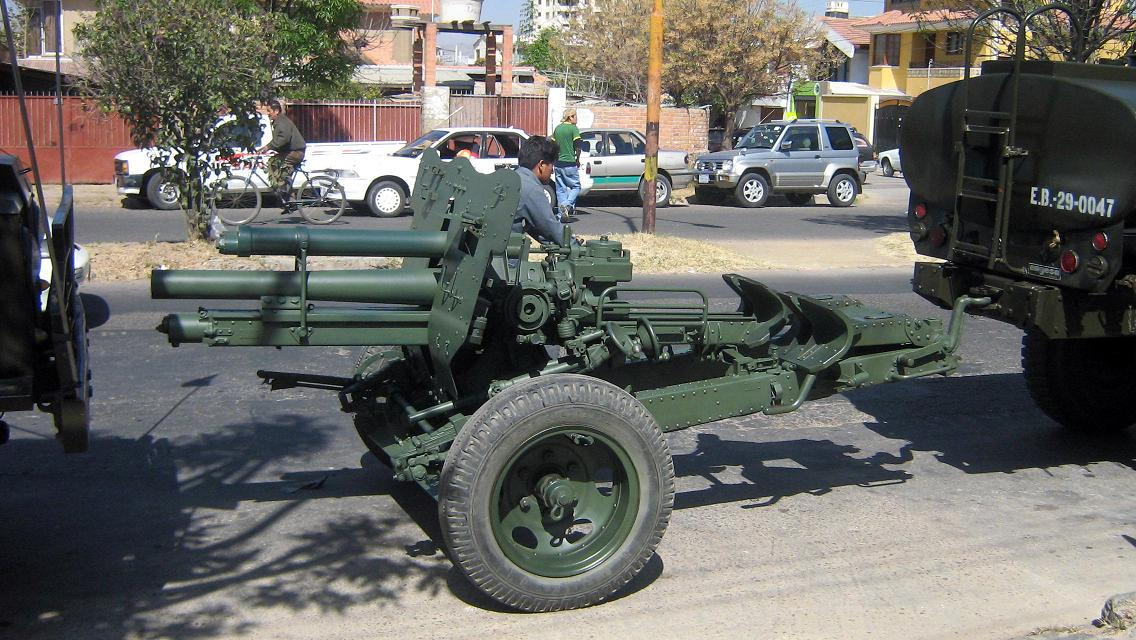
7.5 cm FK 18 before a parade in Cochabamba.

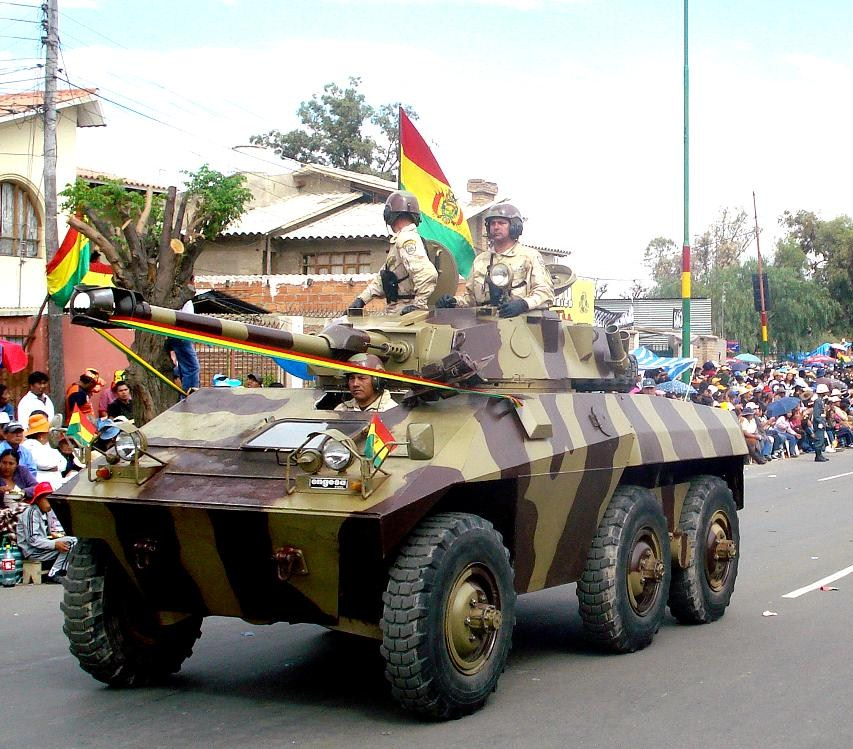
EE-9 Cascavel of Bolivia.

Bolivian army equipment
Tanks	54 SK-105 Kürassiers
Reconnaissance vehicles	24 EE-9 Cascavel
Armoured Personnel Carriers	50 M113 armored personnel carriers with local upgrades, 24 EE-11 Urutu APC,24 M9 half-track APC, 15 Cadillac Gage Commando V-150, 20 Mowag Roland local upgraded (Used by the military Police)
Artillery pieces and mortar	18 Type 54 122 mm howitzers, 6 M101 105 mm howitzers, 10 7.5 cm FK 18 howitzers, 6 Bofors 75 mm Model 1934 75 mm howitzers. Mortars: M-120 120 mm, M30 107 mm mortars, 250 M29 81 mm mortars, FM 81 mm, W87 81 mm, M-224 60 mm mortars AA artillery: 16 2×37 mm Type 65, 80 2×20 mm Oerlikon 20 mm cannon K20, 50 MANPAD HN-5 AT weapons:rocket launchers RPG-7, 200 66 mm M72A3 LAW, 90 mm M20A1, 90 mm M67 recoilless rifle, RCL 82 mm Type 65/78, RCL 106 mm M40A1,40 portable AT missile HJ-8AiB Red Arow
Transport	TRANSPORT:DongFeng EQ 2081/2100, FEW C A1122J, Stayer 1491,16 Ford F-750, Unimog 416Dodge M-37 2 1/2 ton trucks, Engesa EE-15 trucks, Engesa EE-25 trucks, FIAT IVECO 619 5 ton trucksTACTICAL TRANSPORT VEHICLES:30 M988 HMMWV,40 Koyak local productionUTILITY TRANSPORT VEHICLES:Ford M151 jeep, CJ-5, CJ-7, Chrysler jeep Wrangler, BJ 2020VJ, horses (still used by the Bolivian cavalry units)
Small Arms	HANDGUNS: FN-35,Glock 17, Beretta Model 92F, SM Model 10 (all 9mm)[Source?], M1911A1 11,43 SMG: FMK 3, UZI, MAT 49 (all 9mm)Rifle: IMI Galil AR, M16A1, M4A1, Steyr AUG A1, SA 80, all (5.56 mm), FN-FAL, SIG-542, SIG-510-4, (all 7.62mm), Type 56–2(ak-47),SNIPER: Dragunov SVD, Mauser model 86SR, Steyr SSG-69P1AM Rifles:Steyr HS 50 12.7mmMG: M60, FN-MAG 60–20, SIG MG710-3 (all 7.62mm), Type 56 LMGGL:Type 87 35 mm, MM−1, M79, M203 (all 40 mm) Shotguns:Remington 870 and 11–87.

=== Uniforms ===
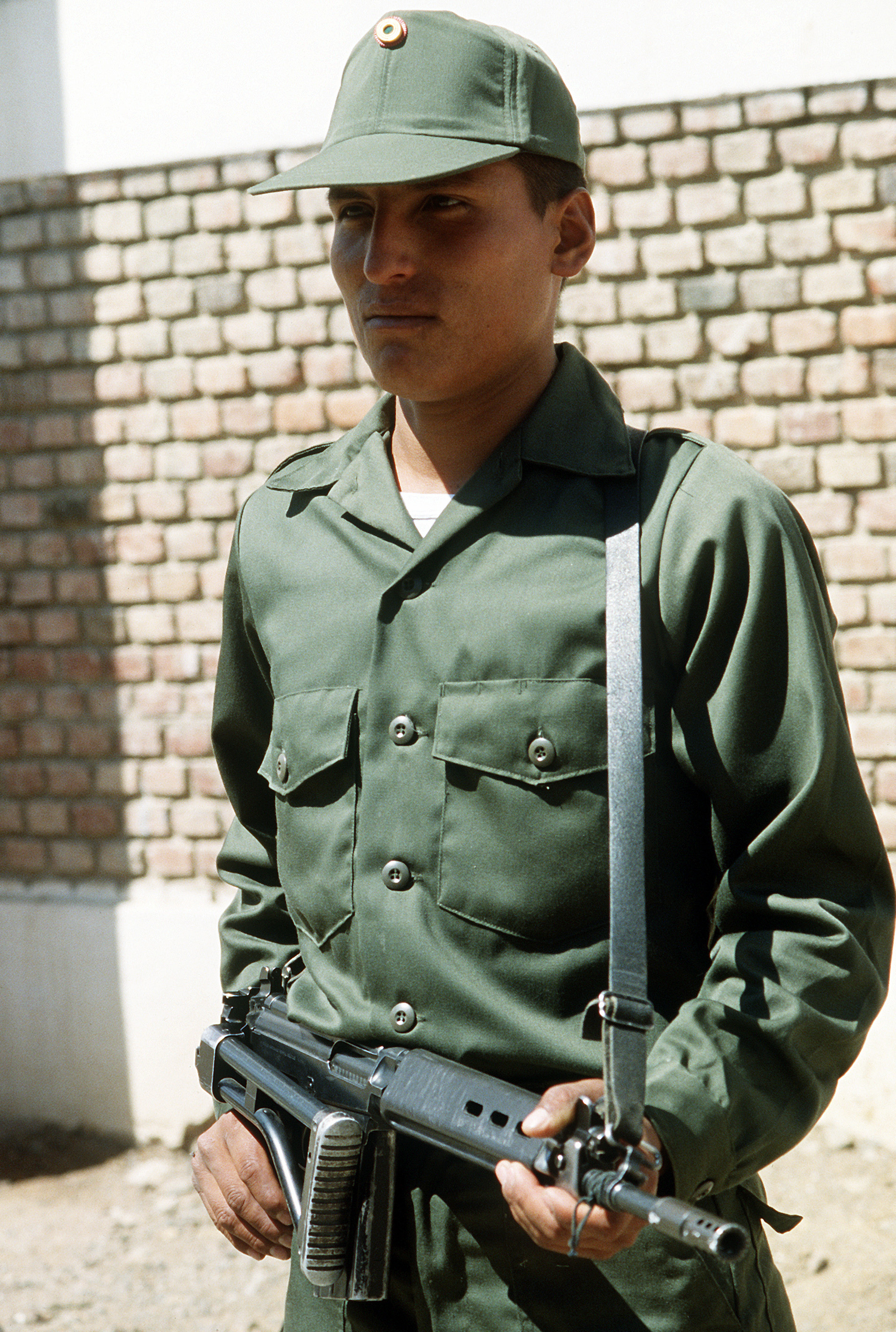
A Bolivian Army soldier armed with a 7.62mm FN FAL rifle stands guard during Fuerzas Unidas Bolivia, a joint U.S. and Bolivian training exercise in April 1986.

Army officers, NCOs, and enlisted personnel generally wear gray or, for tropical areas, gray-green service uniforms. Army fatigue uniforms are olive green, and combat uniforms are of US woodland pattern camouflage. The standard headgear for enlisted personnel is the beret bearing the national colors of red, yellow and green. Paratroops (paracaidistas) were distinguished by black berets, and Special Forces by green berets.

== Air Force ==
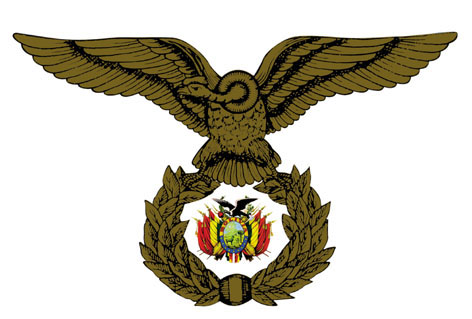
Coat of arms of the Bolivian Air Force

The Bolivian air force (Fuerza Aérea Boliviana, FAB) is the air branch of the armed forces of Bolivia. The Bolivian Air Force has nine air bases, located at La Paz, Cochabamba, Santa Cruz, Puerto Suárez, Tarija, Villamontes, Cobija, Riberalta, and Roboré.

Major commands included the following:

- General Command Systems Department in La Paz, equipped with sophisticated computers. In March 1989, FAB took a major step toward modernizing its force by inaugurating the

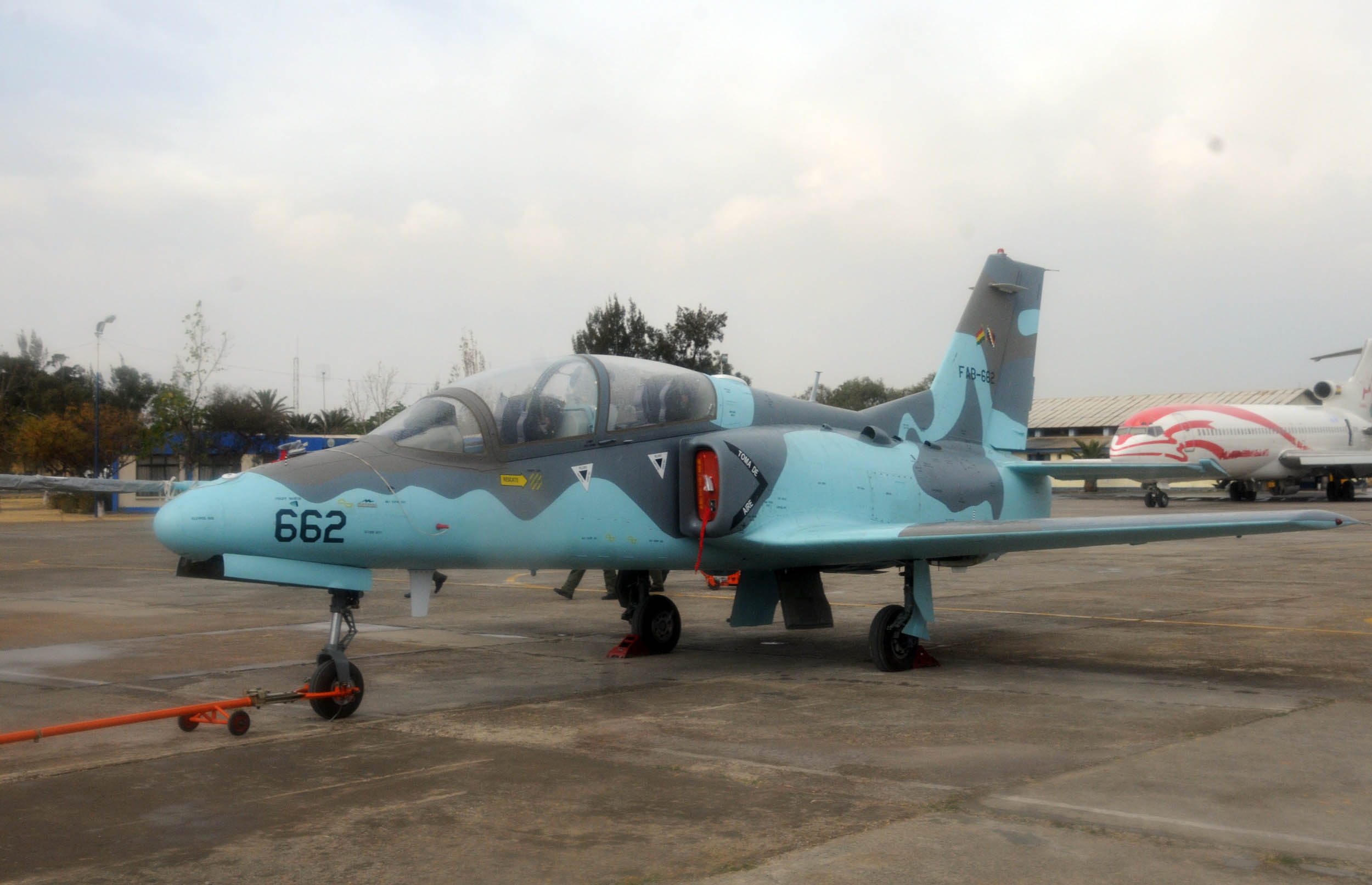
K-8VB Karakorum of the FAB

- Group of Security and Defense of Air Installations (Grupo de Seguridad y Defensa de Instalaciones Aéreas—GSDIA); and GADA-91, GADA-92, GADA-93 and GADA-94.
- Four air brigades with thirteen subordinate air groups.
  - First Air Brigade (El Alto):
    - Hunting air group 31 "G.J.Market": Fighter squadron 311, Executive squadron 310
    - Transport air group 71 "Gen.W.A.Rojas" (Military airlift TAM):Air squadron 710, Air squadron 711, Air squadron 712
    - Aerophotogrammetry National Service (NSS)
    - Bolivian Air Transport-TAB
    - Task Force "Black devils"
    - Group air defence artillery GADA-91
  - Second Air Brigade (Cochabamba):
    - Hunting air group 34 "P.R.Cuevas": Aerotactico squadron 340, Link training squadron 341
    - Group air search and rescue 51: Squadron helicopter 511
    - Group air defence artillery GADA-92
  - Third Air Brigade (Santa Cruz):
    - Hunting Air Group 32 "B.B.Rioja": squadron 321, squadron 320, squadron 327 (maintenance)
    - COLMILAV Training squadrons: primary squadron, basic squadron, squadron "NN" (prob.navigation)
    - Air group air reconnaissance and exploration 82(air base Puerto Suárez): 831 squadron
    - Air group 61 "Gen.L.G.Pereiera (air base Puerto Suárez): squadron 610
    - Task force "Red Devils" (air base The Trompillo-Robore)
    - Group air defence artillery GADA-93
  - Fourth Air Brigade:
    - Group air reconnaissance and exploration 82 "Cap.A.V.Peralta" (air base Tarija): squadron 821
    - Air Group 63 "Tcnl.E.L.Rivera" (air base Villamontes): squadron 630
    - Group air defence artillery GADA-94

=== Units under direct control of the general command of the FAB ===
- Tactical air group 62 (air base Riberalta): squadron 620
- Air group 64: squadron (air base Cobija) 640
- Transport air group 72 (air base Trinidad) : squadron 720

== Navy ==
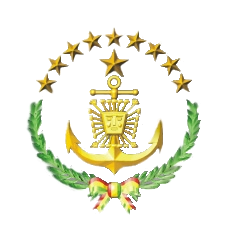
Coat of arms of the Bolivian Navy

The Bolivian Naval Force (Fuerza Naval Boliviana in Spanish), formerly Bolivian Navy (Armada Boliviana) is a naval force about 5,000 strong in 2008. Although Bolivia has been landlocked since the War of the Pacific in 1879, Bolivia established a River and Lake Force (Fuerza Fluvial y Lacustre) in January 1963 under the Ministry of National Defense. It consisted of four boats supplied from the United States and 1,800 personnel recruited largely from the army. Bolivia's naval force was renamed the Bolivian Naval Force (Fuerza Naval Boliviana) in January 1966, but it also has been called the Bolivian Navy (Armada Boliviana). It became a separate branch of the armed forces in 1963. Bolivia has large rivers that are tributaries to the Amazon which are patrolled to prevent smuggling and drug trafficking. There is also a Bolivian Naval presence on Lake Titicaca, the highest navigable lake in the world, across which runs along the Peruvian frontier.

Naval Ensign of Bolivia

Landlocked Bolivia has not gotten over the loss of its coast to Chile, and the Navy still exists to keep the hope of recovering its coast alive by maintaining maritime consciousness. The Bolivian Navy takes part in many parades and government functions, but none more so than the Día Del Mar (Day of the Sea) in which Bolivia, every year, asks for the coast territories lost to Chile during the War of the Pacific (fought between Peru and Bolivia against Chile) from 1879 to 1884. This still effects Bolivia, influencing many modern-day political actions and trade decisions.

=== Districts ===
The Navy is organized into ten naval districts, with flotilla headquarters in Guaqui, Guayaramerín, Puerto Suárez, Riberalta, and San Pedro de Tiquina, and bases in Puerto Busch, Puerto Horquilla, Puerto Villarroel, Trinidad, and Rurrenabaque.

Naval vessels include several dozen boats, dozen or more of which are for riverine patrol, including the piranias, and riders, which are powerful river boats. In addition, Bolivia has several seagoing vessels, including the Santa Cruz de la Sierra (PR-51), and several flagged ships that sail with the permission of the "Capitanias Navales" Naval Registration Office. The Libertador Simón Bolívar, a ship acquired from Venezuela, use to navigate from its home port in Rosario, Argentina on the Paraná River. In 1993, the Navy was formally renamed the Naval Force (Fuerza Naval) and moved with the Bolivian Army under a single military authority.

Most of the officers are often educated in the Naval Academy where they graduate with a BS in Military and Naval Science, diploma accredited by the Military University and then they do other studies at the bachelor's degree and master's level. Argentina has their Naval Military Group in Bolivia advising at the highest level in naval strategy and tactics. Many Bolivian officers practice ocean sailing in Argentinean big naval ships. The Bolivian Navy has several Special Forces units to address both internal and external conflicts.

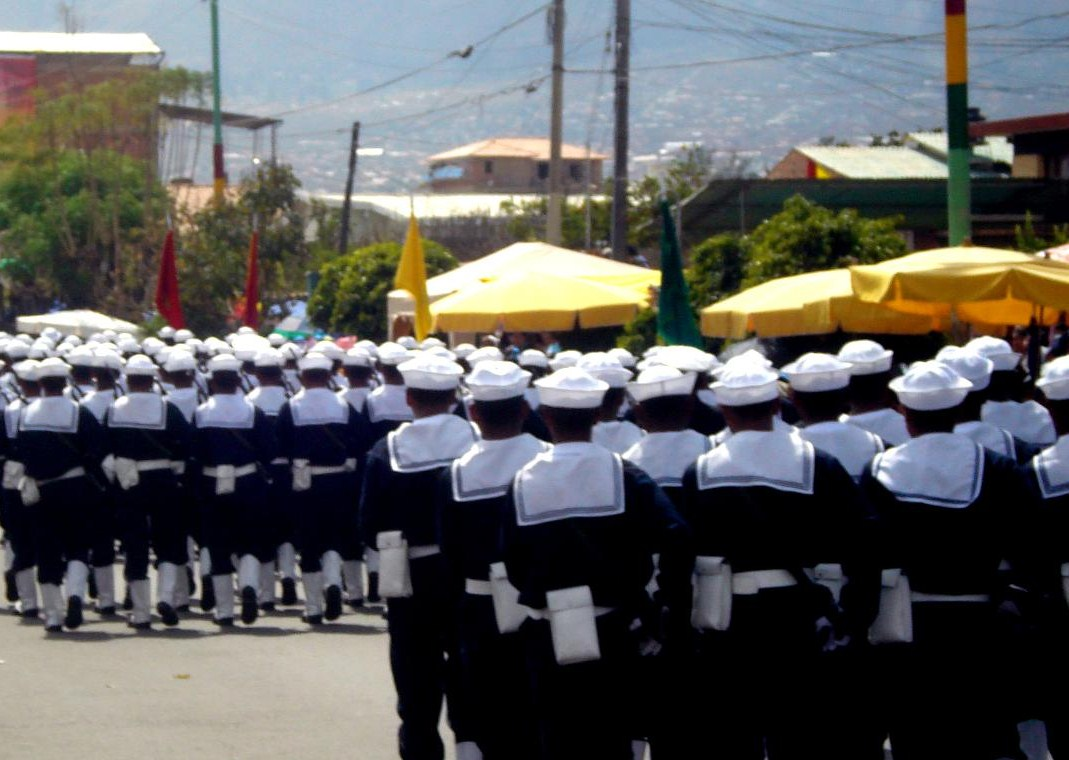
Marines of Bolivia marching in Cochabamba.

The Bolivian Naval Force covers the extensive river and lake Bolivian territory divided between the following functions Naval Districts, note that the names of these units are derived from the basin or region where they operate:

  - DN1 Primer Distrito Naval "BENI"- DN1 First Naval District "BENI"
  - DN2 Segundo Distrito Naval- "MAMORE"- DN2 Second Naval District "MAMORA"
  - DN3 Tercer Distrito Naval "MADERA" -DN3 Third Naval District "Madera"
  - DN4 Cuarto Distrito Naval "TITICACA" -DN4 Fourth Naval District Titicaca
  - DN5 Quinto Distrito Naval "SANTA CRUZ DE LA SIERRA" -DN5 Fifth Naval District "SANTA CRUZ DE LA SIERRA"
  - DN6 Sexto Distrito Naval "COBIJA" -Sixth Naval District DN6 "COBIJA"
  - The Naval Service Areas:
    - AN 1 "COCHABAMBA" – Naval Area 1 "Cochabamba"
    - AN 2 "SANTA CRUZ" – Naval Area 2 "SANTA CRUZ"
    - AN 3 "BERMEJO" – Naval Area 3 "Bermejo"
    - AN 4 "LA PAZ" – Naval Area 4 "La Paz"
  - And the special units:
    - Fuerza de Tarea "Diablos Azules"- Task Force "Blue Devils"
    - Servicio de Inteligencia Naval – SINDA Naval Intelligence Service – SINDA
    - Grupo de Reacción Inmediata GRIN -Immediate Response Group GRIN
    - El Centro de Instrucción de Buceo en Altura- High Altitude Diving Training Center
    - Command Training Center Amphibians

==== Marine corps ====
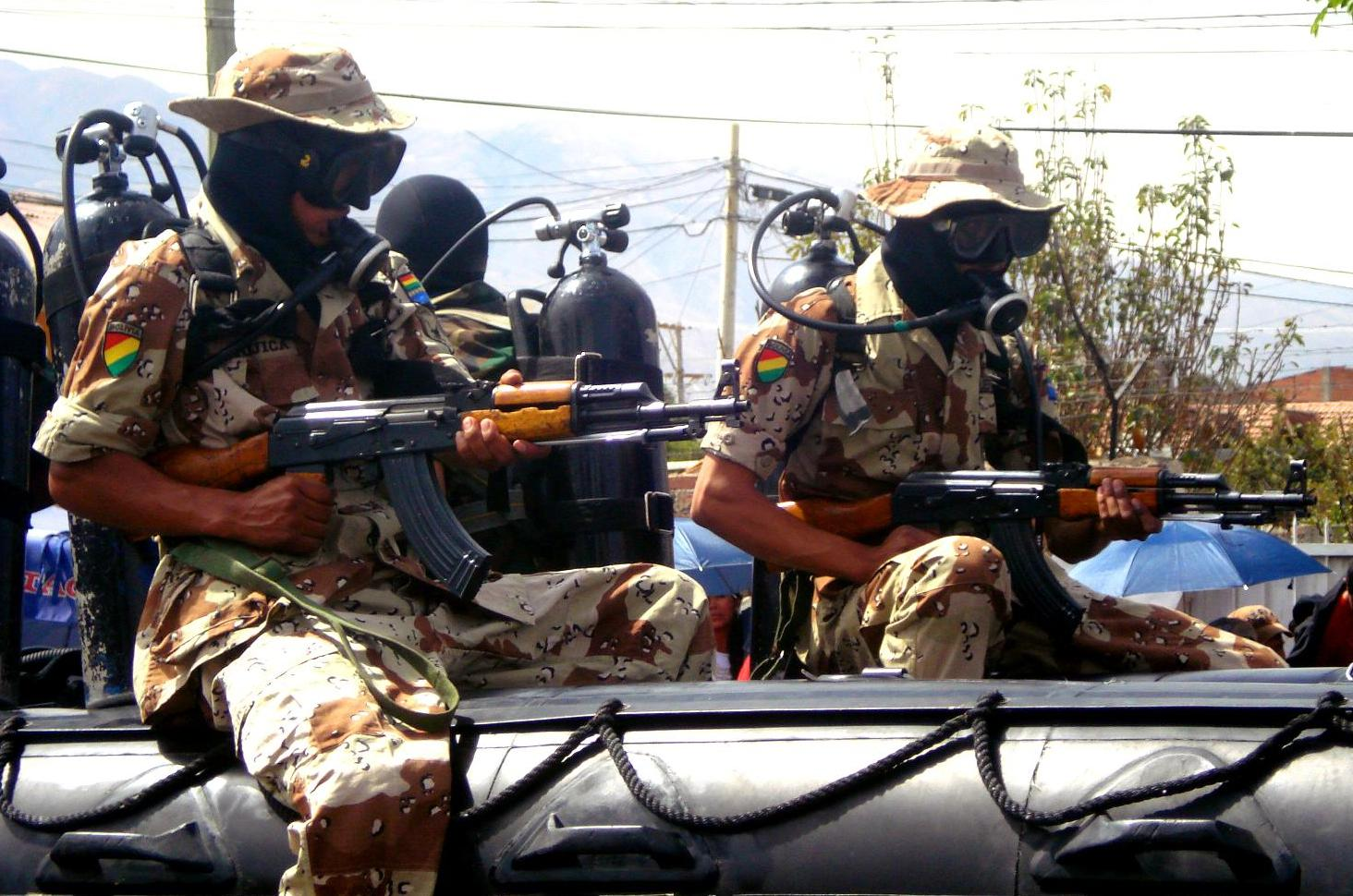
Bolivian Marines above inflatable boats.

The Marine component of the FNB originated with the creation of the Marine Battalion Almirante Grau in the early 1980s. This unit of 600 men is based on Tiquina naval base on Lake Titicaca. Later changes name to Marine Battalion Independence, based in Chua (Not to be confused with the Independence RI17 EB).At present this battalion maintains a similar number of troops including premilitares. Staff of this unit is part of Task Force Blue Devils or are stationed in various naval bases. There are currently seven infantry battalions which are distributed as follows:

- Primer Distrito Naval "BENI"- First Naval District "BENI"
  - Batallón de Infantería de Marina I "Bagué"- 1st Marine Battalion "Bagué"
- Segundo Distrito Naval "MAMORE"- Second Naval District "MAMORA"
  - Batallón de Infantería de Marina II "Tocopilla"- 2nd Marine Battalion "Tocopilla"
- Tercer Distrito Naval "MADERA"- Third Naval District "MADERA"
  - Batallón de Infantería de Marina III "Mejillones"- Marine Battalion III "Mejillones"
- Cuarto Distrito Naval "TITICACA"- Fourth Naval District Titicaca
  - Batallón de Infantería de Marina IV "Alianza " -Marine Infantry Battalion IV "Alliance"
  - Batallón de Infantería de Marina Mecanizada VI "Independencia"- Marine Infantry Battalion Mechanized VI "Independence"
- Quinto Distrito Naval "SANTA CRUZ DE LA SIERRA"- Fifth Naval District "SANTA CRUZ DE LA SIERRA"
  - Batallón de Infantería de Marina V "Calama"- Marine Battalion V Calama
- Sexto Distrito Naval "COBIJA"- Sixth Naval District "COBIJA"
  - Batallón de Infantería de Marina VII "Columna Porvenir"- Marine Battalion VII "Columna Porvenir"

==== Naval Military Police ====
This specialty is essentially similar to its counterpart in the Army, carrying out operations such as Important Persons Protection (IPP) Physical Security (SEF) or Patrol Facility (PAT), with additions such as signals or naval protocol. There Naval detachments of PM in all district headquarters or FNB Naval Area. But only have the following units at the Battalion:

- AN 4 " La Paz "- AN 4 "La Paz"
  - Batallón de Policía Militar Naval N° 1- 1st Naval Military Police Battalion
- AN 1 "COCHABAMBA"- AN 1 "Cochabamba"
  - Batallón de Policia Militar Naval N° 2 "Carcaje"- 2nd Naval Military Police Battalion "Quiver"
- AN 2 "SANTA CRUZ"- AN 2 "SANTA CRUZ"
- Batallón de Policía Militar Naval N° 3 -Naval Military Police Battalion No. 3
- Cuarto Distrito Naval "TITICACA"- Fourth Naval District Titicaca
  - Batallón de Policía Militar Naval N° 4- Naval Military Police Battalion No. 4

=== Equipment ===
==== Boats ====
The Bolivian Navy has a total of 173 vessels, mostly stationed on Lake Titicaca:

- PATROL:
- 1 Class PR-51
- 6 class boats Cap. Bretel Bretel
- 4 patrol boats lake
- 32 Boston Whaler
- UNITS SALVAGE:
- 8 Piranha assault boats Mk.1
- 3 Boats hospitals
- 2 Transport of hydrocarbons
- 2 Tanker Ships
- 1 Transport
- 1 Ship "Naval School"

== Training installations ==
Training installations include the Garras International Antinarcotics Training School (Escuela Garras del Valor) is a military training facility located in Bolivia, which trains military and law enforcement personnel from Bolivia and other Latin American countries in counternarcotics, intelligence, and counterinsurgency techniques.

== See also ==
- List of wars involving Bolivia
- Preussischer Präsentiermarsch, march past music used by the military
