= Juan José Zúñiga =

Bolivian general

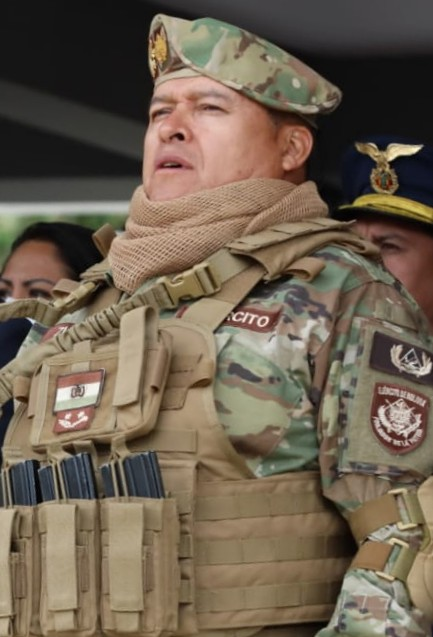
- José Zúñiga in 2022

Commanding General of the Bolivian Army
- In office 1 November 2022 – 26 June 2024
- President: Luis Arce
- Succeeded by: José Wilson Sánchez

Personal details
- Born: 30 September 1968 (age 57) Uncía, Potosí, Bolivia

Military service
- Allegiance: Bolivia
- Branch/service: Bolivian Army
- Rank: General

Juan José Zúñiga Macías (born 30 September 1968) is a former Bolivian Army officer who served as the General of the Bolivian Army from November 2022 until his dismissal in June 2024 following his role in the coup d'état attempt against the President Luis Arce.

== Early life and military career ==
=== Early life ===
Juan Zúñiga Macías was born in Uncía municipality, Bolivia. After finishing primary and secondary education, he entered the Bolivian Army and graduated in 1990, placing 48th out of 65 officers.

=== Military career ===
Zúñiga served as colonel of the REIM-23 Max Toledo regiment between 2012 and 2013. He was charged with the embezzlement of Bs2.7 million intended for the Renta Dignidad and Juancito Pinto cash transfer schemes and well for traveling abroad without permission during his tenure and was tortured for seven days. He subsequently worked as a police officer.

After serving as Chief of Staff and brigadier general, Zúñiga was appointed as commanding general of the Bolivian Army through a decree by Luis Arce on 1 November 2022.

== Conflict with Evo Morales ==
On 24 June 2024, Zuñiga announced that the Bolivian Armed Forces would arrest former President Evo Morales if he ran as a candidate in the next presidential elections in 2025. In threats made against Morales, he described the former president as a "traitor" and accused him of plotting a revolution against the current government, while stating that the Constitution of Bolivia would prevent Morales from returning to power. Following Zuñiga's proclamation, he was relieved of his post of commanding general on 25 June 2024.

Prior to this event, Zuñiga was accused by Evo Morales of being the commander of the military organization Pachajcho, allegedly plotting to eliminate the former president as part of a "black plan" against coca production leaders and political opponents.

== 2024 coup attempt ==
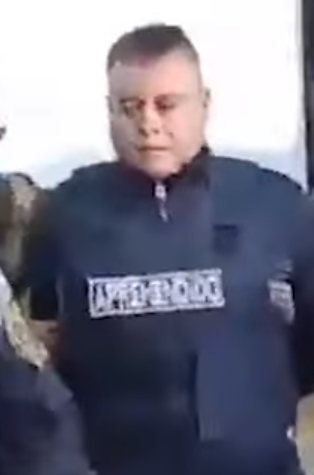
Detained Zúñiga after the 2024 coup attempt

He was the primary leader behind the 2024 Bolivian coup attempt on 26 June, attempting to "restore democracy". President Luis Arce called on Zúñiga to demobilize soldiers who had taken over the main square of La Paz. Zúñiga was detained by police soon after. Zúñiga claimed that on 23 June—before the events had begun, which led to his arrest—he had met with Luis Arce; Zúñiga alleged that during their meeting, Arce had stated that to boost his popularity, he would attempt a self-coup; Zúñiga alleged that Arce had ordered Zúñiga to assist in this self-coup by deploying tanks into the streets.

As of 28 June 2024, Zúñiga and several other suspects in the coup attempt are currently detained in the Chonchocoro maximum-security prison outside La Paz following an order for their six-month pre-trial detention.
