= Casa Grande del Pueblo =

Bolivian presidential residence since 2018

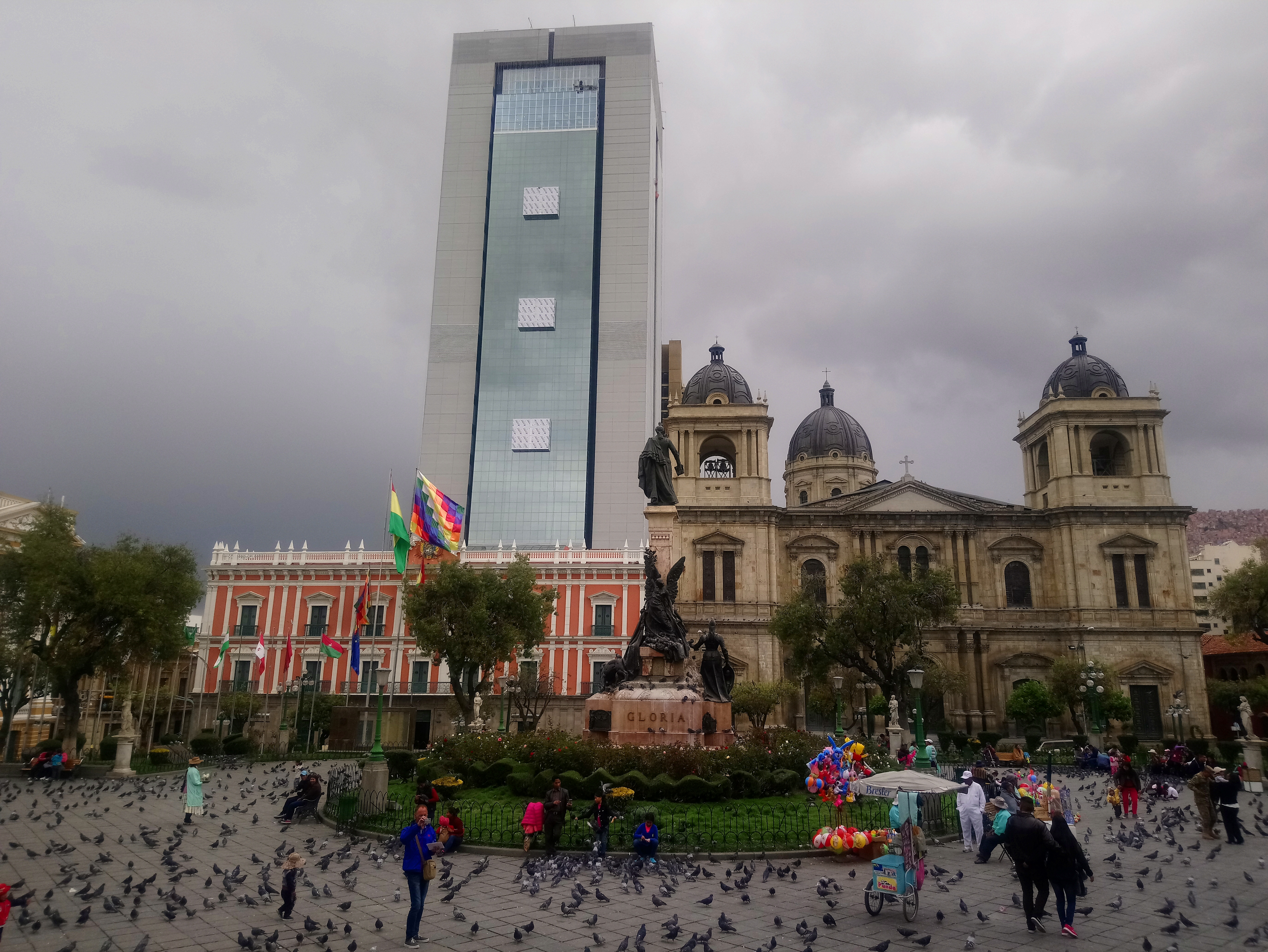
- Casa Grande del Pueblo in 2018 (the 30 story tower)
- Interactive map of the Casa Grande del Pueblo area

Record height
- Tallest in La Paz, Bolivia since 2018^{[I]}

General information
- Type: Palace
- Location: La Paz, Bolivia
- Coordinates: 16°29′48″S 68°08′02″W
- Groundbreaking: 2014
- Inaugurated: 9 August 2018
- Cost: $34 million
- Owner: Government of Bolivia

Height
- Height: 131 m (430 ft)

Technical details
- Floor count: 30

Design and construction
- Structural engineer: Galindo Ingeniería

The Casa Grande del Pueblo (English: Great House of the People) is the Bolivian presidential residence that replaced the Palacio Quemado in 2018. It is a 30 story tower. Inaugurated on 9 August 2018 during the presidency of Evo Morales as the official residence of the President of Bolivia, the interim government of Jeanine Áñez reverted to occupying the Palacio Quemado from 2019 to 2020. Following the inauguration of Luis Arce on 8 November 2020, it has again become the residence of the president.

== History ==
=== Planning ===
The proposal for the tower was initially declined due to municipal height restrictions in the historical district, with La Paz's mayoral office saying that the Land Use and Settlement Patterns prohibited such buildings, with spokesperson Luis Lugones stating "If the government wants to build a 10 or 12-story palace, that would be prohibited". Allies of President Evo Morales in the Plurinational Legislative Assembly assisted with bypassing the law, however, permitting the tower's construction.

Controversy surrounded the location of the tower's proposed site, Casa Alencastre, a former residence of the archbishop that was built in 1821, before the creation of the Bolivian state. Cultural and historical groups opposed the destruction of Casa Alencastre. The historical building was ultimately demolished.

Casa Grande del Pueblo was inaugurated by Morales on 9 August 2018 and cost $34 million.

=== Design and features ===
The 30-story tower standing at 131 metres (430 ft) was the tallest building in the capital city of La Paz when completed.

In the lobby, a mural of Pachamama created by Roberto Mamani Mamani is featured while an archway displays 36 faces, half man and half woman, representing the 36 recognized indigenous groups of Bolivia. On the exterior, three symbols are displayed representing the three climate zones of Bolivia; the Andes, the basins of the mountains and the lowlands.

The building features a helipad and the top two floors were reserved for the president, featuring a gym, spa and private elevator. The presidential suite in total is 1,068 square metres (11,500 ft^{2}). The bedroom is 61 square metres (660 ft^{2}) and features unique designer furniture, including a bed with indigenous patterns adorning the frame. The bathroom and dressing room measure 47 square metres (510 ft^{2}) and feature both a shower and jacuzzi. A sitting room is decorated with a painting featuring portraits of world leaders, including Nelson Mandela and Fidel Castro.

=== 2024 coup attempt ===
On 26 June 2024, Bolivian military forces led by Juan José Zúñiga attempted to storm the Casa Grande del Pueblo as part of a coup attempt following Zúñiga being relieved from his post by President Luis Arce due to alleged threats made against former president Evo Morales. The coup attempt concluded with Zúñiga being confronted by President Arce within the Casa Grande del Pueblo, after which he was officially dismissed along with other military officials involved, and arrested.
