= Bolivian Army =

Land warfare branch of Bolivia

- Ejército de Bolivia
- Founded: 1810; 216 years ago
- Country: Bolivia
- Branch: Army
- Size: 26,000 to 60,000 (2019 est.)
- Part of: Armed Forces of Bolivia
- Mottos: "Army of Bolivia, Forger of the country."
- Colors
- March: Bolivian Army Song
- Anniversaries: 6 August (Independence Day)
- Website: ejercito.mil.bo

Commanders
- Commander-in-Chief: President Rodrigo Paz
- Commanding General of the Army: General de Ejército; José Wilson Sánchez

Insignia
- Flag

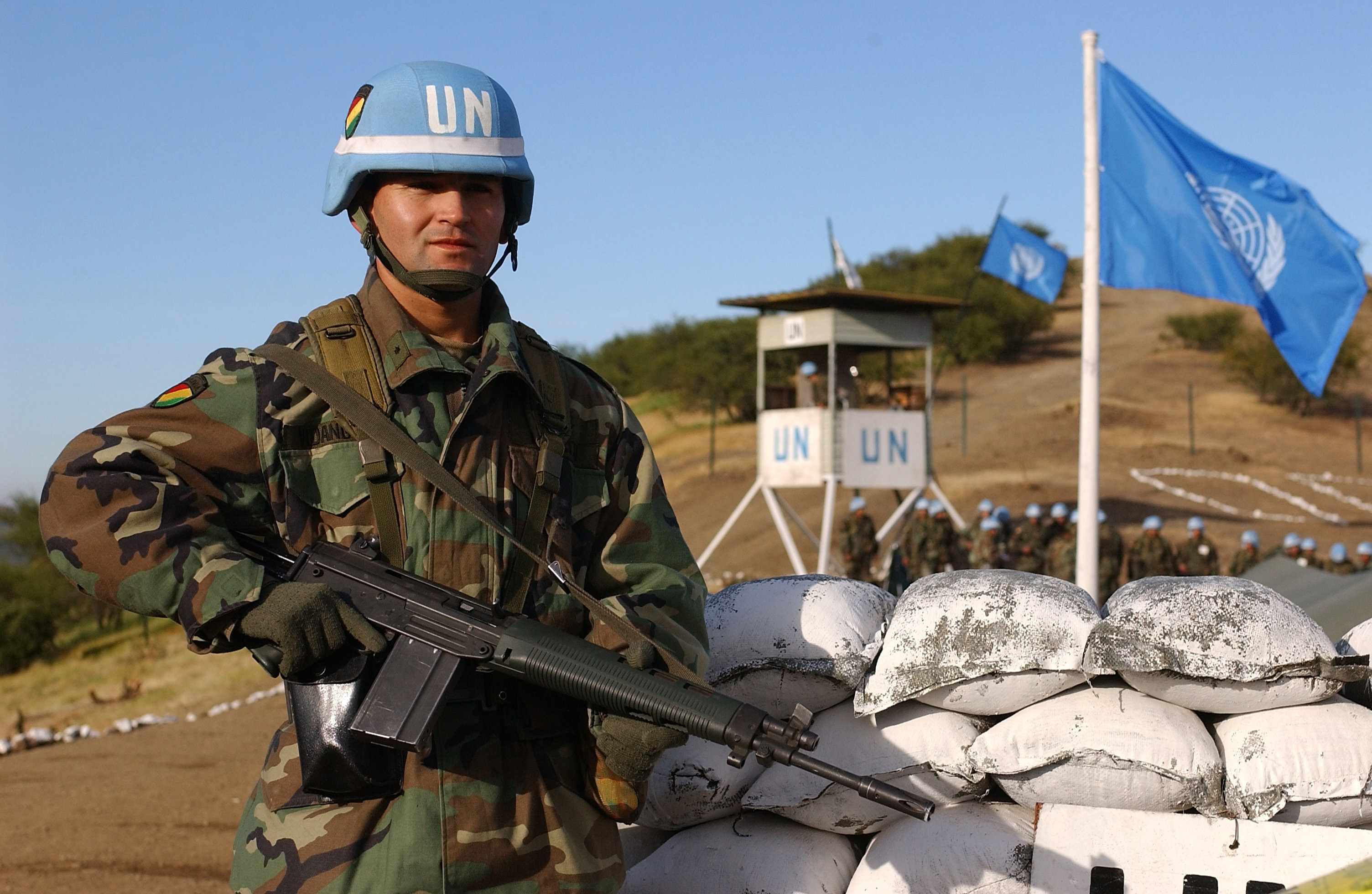
A Bolivian soldier stands guard at the entry control point during training in October 2002

The Bolivian Army (Spanish: Ejército Boliviano) is the land force branch of the Armed Forces of Bolivia. Figures on the size and composition of the Bolivian army vary considerably, with little official data available. It is estimated that the army has between 26,000 and 60,000 men.

== History ==
=== 2024 coup attempt ===
On June 26, 2024, the General of the Bolivian Army, General Juan José Zúñiga lead an attempted coup against the democratically elected President, Luis Arce, who was elected in the 2020 general election with 55.1% of the vote. The army stormed the Presidential Palace in the capital of La Paz. Subsequently, the Generals of the three branches of the military were dismissed, with Juan José Zúñiga, the leader of the coup attempt, being arrested the same day. He was replaced as General of the Army by José Wilson Sánchez.

== Organization ==
=== Combat units directly under the Army general command ===
- 1st Infantry Regiment Colorados (Presidential Guard), contains two 2 battalions: BI-201 and BI-202
- BATCOM-251,
- Gen. maintenance cen. no. 1
- Transport batt. no. 1.
- 1st National parks Security Regiment

==== Special forces command ====
The Special Forces command controls the following units:

- 1st Ranger Regt. German Busch, Challapata
- 12th Ranger Regt. "MANCHEGO", Montero
- 16th Infantry Regt. JORDAN, Riberalta (Special Forces)
- 18th Parachute Infantry Regiment VICTORIA "Army Special Troops Training Center", Cochabamba
- 24th Ranger Regiment (Mountain) MÉNDEZ ARCOS, Challapata

==== Army aviation command ====
- 291st Cavalry Group (La Paz)
  - Army aviation company 291 (La Paz)
  - army aviation company 292 (Santa Cruz)

=== Regional ===
The Bolivian Army has six military regions (regiones militares—RMs) covering the various Departments of Bolivia:

- RM 1, La Paz, most of La Paz Department: 1st Army Division, 1st Mechanized Division, 297th MPB C.L.Saavedra (Military Police battalion), 296th En Btn CNL R.C.Zabalegui (ecological batt.), BE-297 (ecolog. batt.), BATLOG-1 (Logistics btn.), 291st Air Group, 1st Military Hospital, Military Police School, Army Equestrian Center, Military College of Bolivia "COL Gustavo Villaroel Lopez", Army School of Intelligence, Army Engineers School MCAL Antonio Jose de Sucre, Army Signals and Communications School, Army Armor School, Army 1st Engineering Regiment CPN Felipe Ochoa "Army Engineering and Maintenance Center", Bolivian Army Military School of Music "LTCOL Antonio Patino"
- RM 2, Potosí, covering the departments of Oruro and Potosí: 2nd and 10th ADs,1st RR, 24th RR M.Arcos (ranger regt.), ADA-202 (a.a. group), Army Mountain School
- RM 3, Tarija, consisting of Tarija Department and eastern Chuquisaca and southern Santa Cruz:3rd and 4th AD
- RM 4, Sucre, covering the departments of Cochabamba and northern Chuquisaca: 7th Army Division, 272nd MP Btn., BATLOG-2 (long.Batt), mili.hospital no2, Army Arsensals Cochabamba, Army Command and Staff College MSHL Antonio de Santa Cruz, Army NCO School "SGT M. Paredez", Army Artillery School, 18th PIR "Victoria" (Army Special Troops Training Center), Army NCOs and Warrant Officers Advance Studies Institute, Army Arms Applications School, 1LT Edmundo Andrade Military High School
- RM 5, Cobija, encompassing the Pando Department and parts of La Paz and Beni departments: 6th AD, 16th IR Jordan (special forces), Army Jungle Operations School
- RM 6, Santa Cruz, covering most of Santa Cruz Department: 5th and 8th ADs, 273rd MPB R.Amezaga (Military Police), BE-298 (ecological batt.), 12th RR Manchego (ranger), BATLOG-3 (logist. batt.), 292 army aviation company, Bolivian Condores school (special forces), 6th IR

=== Army Divisions ===
The army is organized into ten territorial divisions, titled Army Divisions (AD), plus a mechanized division, each of which, with the exception of Viacha, occupy a region generally corresponding to the administrative departments, with some overlapping. These and their respective divisional headquarters and constituent units are:

- 1st Mechanized Division Viacha (La Paz Department): 1st Field Artillery Regiment "Camacho", 6th Air Defense Artillery Regiment, 23rd IR (Mechanized Infantry Training), 4th IR Tarapaca (Mech.) 5th ACR, 2nd ACR (Training), 1st Armor Regiment, 8th IR (Mech) "Ayacucho", 2nd Artillery Regt., 6th ADA Regt.
- 1st AD, Viacha (La Paz Department): 36th IR, 35th IR, 30th IR Murillo (mountain), 2nd CEB G.F.Roman.
- 2nd AD (Mountain), Oruro: 21st IR Illimani (Mountain), RI 22 Mejillones, 25th RI (Mountain Training) Tocopilla, RC 8 Braun, Bat.Ing. 7 Sajama.
- 3rd AD, Villamontes (Tarija Department): 5th IR Campero, RI 20 Padilla, RC 3 Aroma, RA 3 Pisagua, 1st CEB Chorolque.
- 4th AD, Camiri (Santa Cruz Department):, 6th Infantry Regiment Campos, RI 11 Boqueron, 1st Cavalry Regt. "E. Avaroa", FAR 4 Bullian
- 5th AD, Roboré (Santa Cruz Department): RI 13 Montes, RI 14 Florida, RI 15 Junin, RC 6 Castrillo, RA 5 Vergara
- 6th AD, Trinidad: RI 17 Indepedencia, RI 29 Echevarria, RI 31 Rios, RI 32 Murguia, 2nd Cavalry Regt. Ballivan, 8th AR Mendez (reserve), Bat.Ing. 6 Riosinho.
- 7th Army Division, Cochabamba (the largest):, 18th Parachute Infantry Regiment "Victoria" (Army Special Troops Training Center), 26th IR R.Barrientos (mech.) 29th PIR "CPT V.Ustariz" (airborne), 7th FA Regt. Tumusia, Bat.Ing.5 T.N.Ovando, 3rd Mil. Police Regt.
- 8th AD, Santa Cruz: RI 7 Marzana, RI 10 Warnes (mech.), RC 10 G.M.J.M. Mercado, RA 9 Mitre (reserve), Bat.Ing. 3 Pando.
- 9th AD (Reserve), Rurrenabaque: the Division has been reduced to reserve status and its component units have been divided up between DE-1 and DE-6
- 10th AD, Tupiz: 2nd Infantry Regiment "Marshal Antonio Jose de Sucre", 3rd IR "Juan Jose Perez", RI 4 Loa, RI 27 Antofagasta, 7th ACR Chichas (Armored Cavalry), RA 12 Ayohuma (reserve)

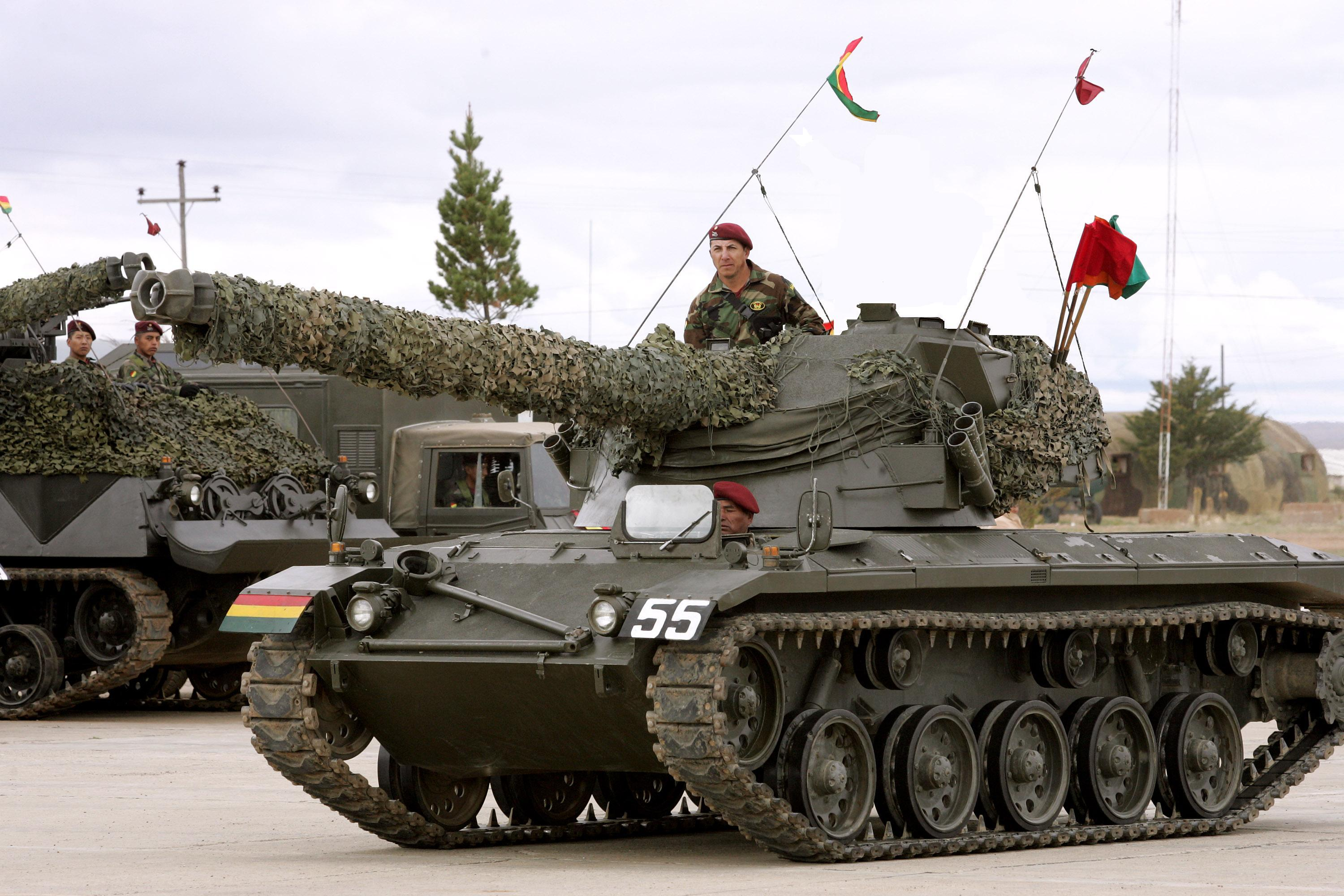
SK-105 Kürassier 19-ton light tank with 105 mm gun in oscillating turret

Regimental abbreviations

RIE/IR/PIR: infantry regiment

RC/ACR: cavalry regiment

RA: artillery regiment

Bat.Ing./CEB: Engineer battalion

The 11 divisions control the following units:

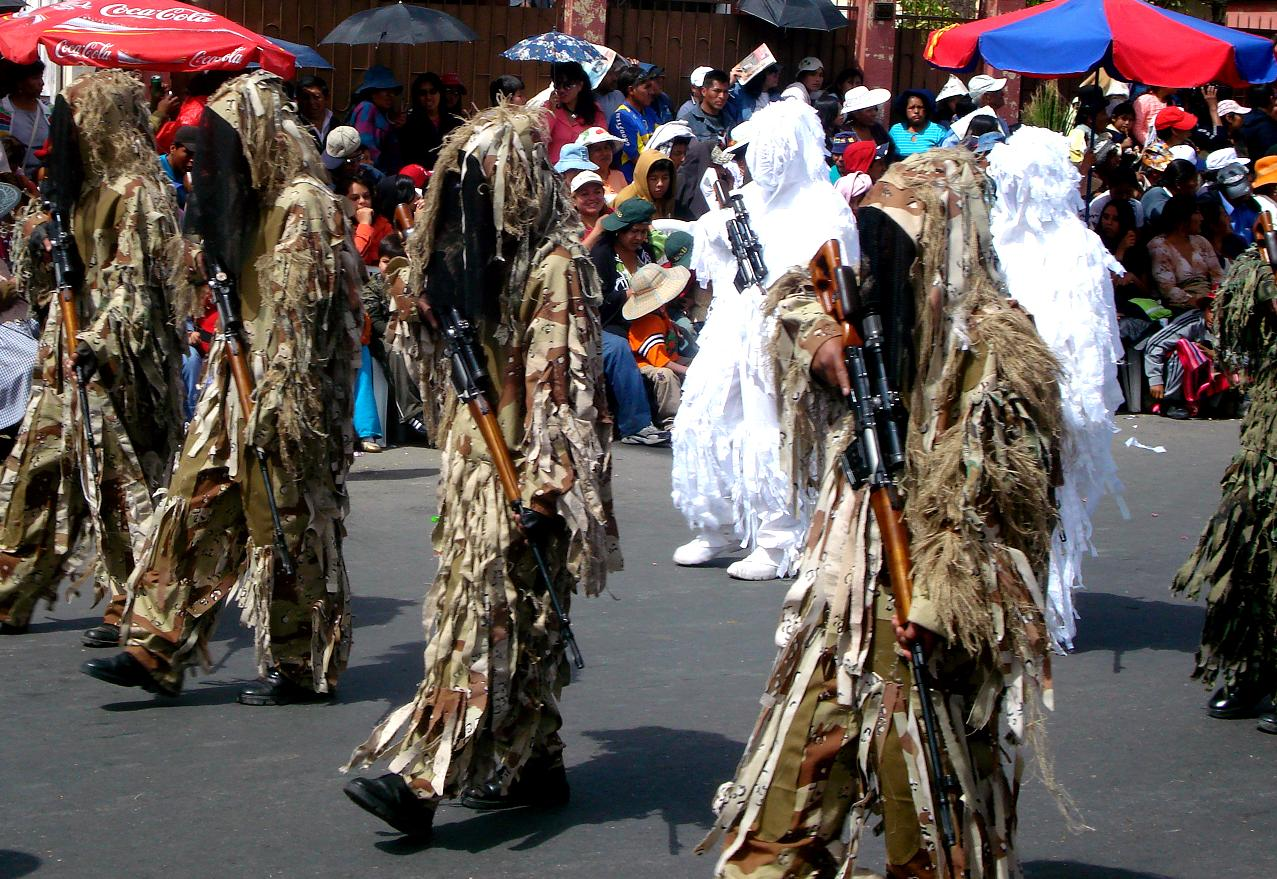
Snipers carrying Dragunov SVD rifles.

- eight cavalry regiments, included two mechanized regiments
- twenty-three infantry regiments included two airborne and two mountain
- one recce. mechanized regiments and one armored regiment
- two ranger regiments and one special forces regiment
- six artillery regiments and plus three in reserve
- one artillery and anti-air group
- one artillery and anti-air Regiment
- three military police battalions
- three ecological battalions
- two army aviation companies
- six engineer battalions
- Plus logistical and instructional support commands
- Presidential Guard (Bolivian Colorados Regiment) infantry regiment under direct control of the army headquarters in La Paz's Miraflores district

The Army maintains a small fleet of utility aircraft, primarily to support headquarters.

== Equipment ==
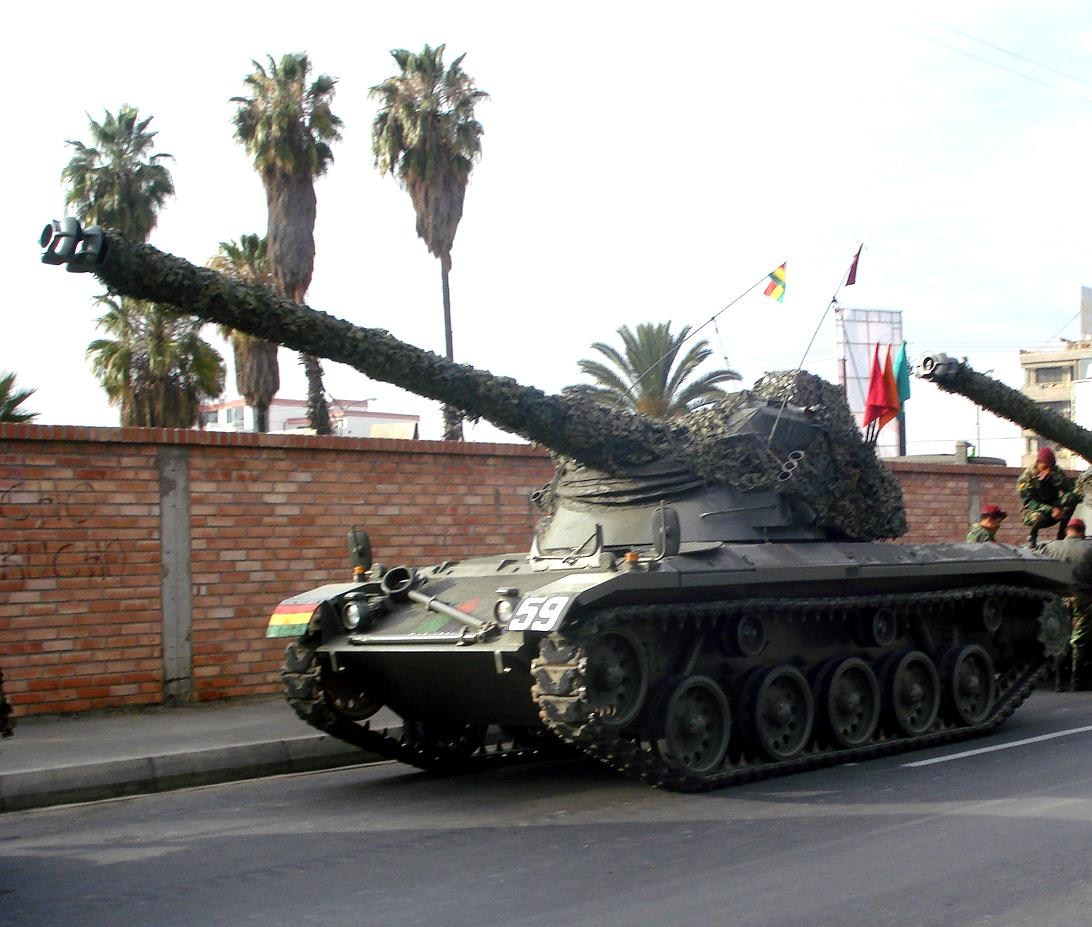
Bolivian SK-105 Kürassier light tank.

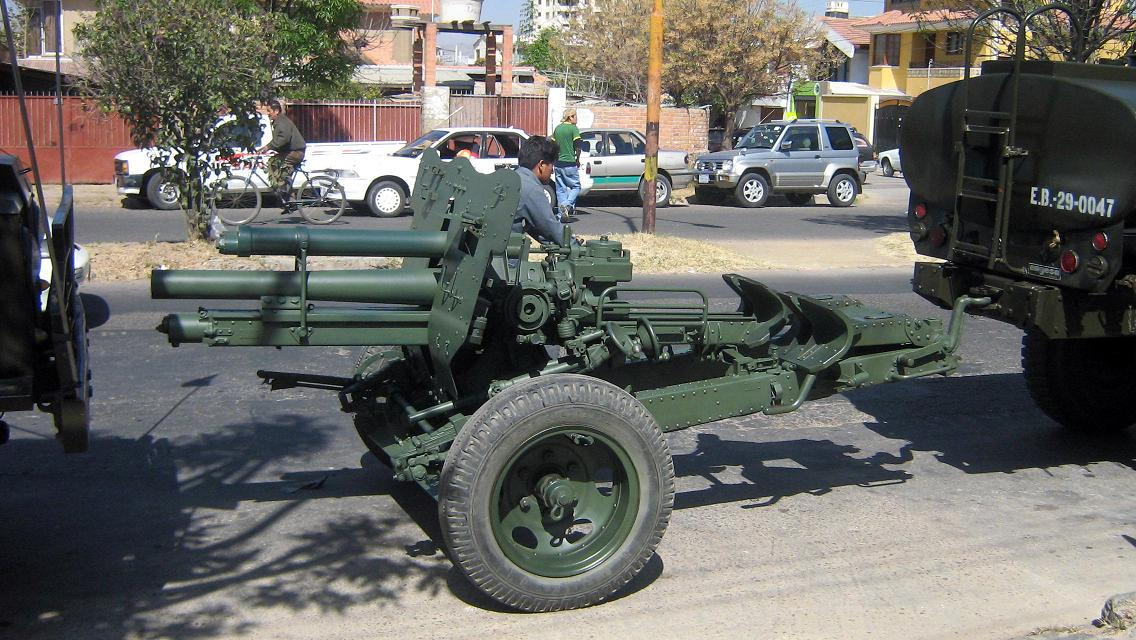
7.5 cm FK 18 during a parade in Cochabamba.

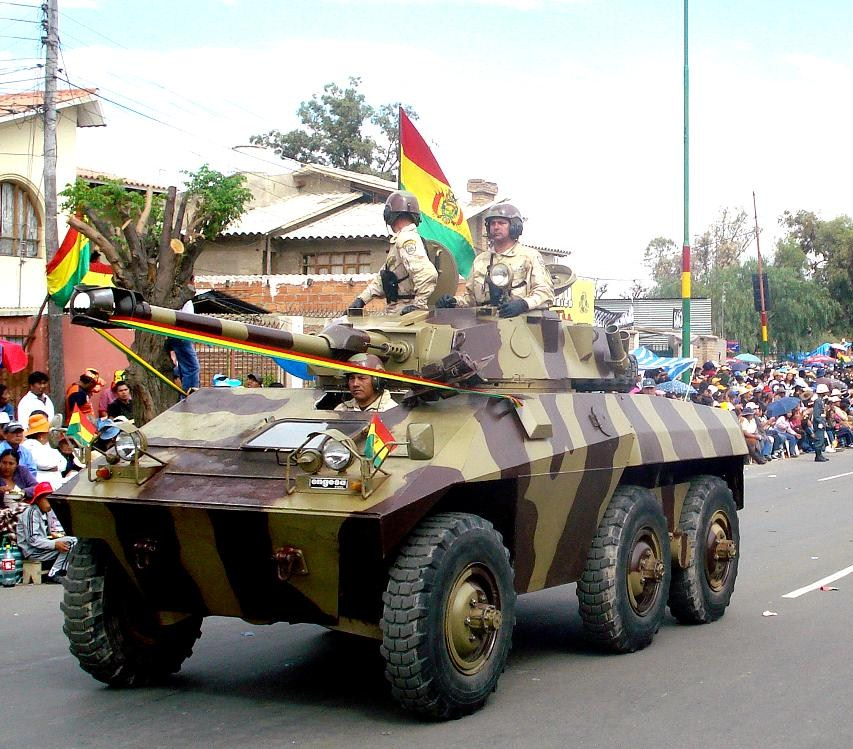
Bolivian EE-9 Cascavel AFV.

=== Vehicles ===
Bolivian army equipment
Tanks	54 SK-105 Kürassier+ 2 4K4FA-SB20 Greif-Recov+ 2~4 M578 Cherry Picker-Reco.
Reconnaissance vehicles	24 EE-9 Cascavel, 50 HMMWV
Armoured personnel carriers	50 M113 armored personnel carriers with local upgrades, 24 EE-11 Urutu APC, 24 M3 Half-track 15 Cadillac Gage Commando V-150, 24 MOWAG Roland (locally upgraded; used by the military police) 41 ZFB-05
Artillery	6 M101 105 mm howitzers; 36 75 mm Pack Howitzer M1; 6 Bofors L/40 M1935 75 mm howitzers; Mortars: M120 120 mm; M30 107 mm mortars; 250 M29 81 mm mortars; FM 81 mm; W87 81mm; M-60 60 mm; Type 63-1 60mm; M224 60 mm mortars; Anti-Air: 16 2x37mm Type 65, 80 2x20mm Oerlikon K20, 50 HN-5 MANPAD Surface-to-air missile Anti-Tank: RPG-7, Type 69-1, 2,000 66 mm M72A3 LAW, RL-83 Blindicide 90 mm M-20 Super-Bazooka, 90 mm M67 recoilless, 82 mm Type 65/78 recoilless, 105 mm M40A1 recoilless, 40 HJ-8B Red Arrow ATGM
Transport	Transport vehicles: DongFeng EQ 2081/2100, FEW C A4140K2E4R7A, Stayer 1491, 16 Ford F-750, ZIL-131, Unimog 416 Dodge M-37 2½ ton trucks, Engesa EE-15 trucks, 597 Engesa EE-25 trucks, FIAT IVECO 619 5 ton trucks Tactical transport vehicles: 30 M988 HMMWV, 40 Kojak (local production) Utility transport vehicles: M151, CJ-5, CJ-7, Jeep Wrangler, BJ 2020VJ, horses (still used by the Bolivian cavalry units)
Small arms	Handguns: Browning Hi Power, Glock 17, Beretta 92F, S&M mod.10 all 9mm, M1911A1 (.45ACP) Sub-Machine Guns: FMK-3, UZI, MAT 49 Assault Rifles: 5,56mm; Galil AR, M16A1, Steyr AUG A1, SA-80. 7,62mm; FN FAL, SIG 542, SIG 510-4, Type 56-2 (AK-47), Sniper Rifles: Dragunov SVD, Mauser mod . 86SR, Steyr SSG 69P1 Anti-materiel Rifles: Steyr HS .50 Machine Guns: M60, FN MAG 60–20, SIG MG 710-3, Type 56 LMG Grenade Launchers: Type 87 35mm, MM-1, M79, M203 Shotguns: Remington 870 and Remington 11-87 .

=== Aircraft ===
==== Current aircraft ====
Name	Origin	Type	Versions	In service	Notes
Fokker F27 Friendship	Netherlands	Transport	F27-MK200	1	
Beechcraft King Air	United States	Utility, VIP	Model 90	1	
Harbin Z-9	France; Europe China	Utility	H425	5	China licensed production Eurocopter AS365

==== Retired aircraft ====
Beechcraft Super King Air Model 200, CASA C-212 Aviocar, Cessna 206 Stationair, Cessna 421B Golden Eagle, Robinson R44.

== Uniforms ==
Army officers, NCOs, and enlisted personnel generally wear gray service uniforms. In tropical areas they wear gray-green service uniforms. Army fatigue uniforms are olive green, and combat uniforms consist of US woodland pattern camouflage and desert pattern camouflage. The standard headgear for enlisted personnel is a beret bearing the national colors of red, yellow, and green. Armoured troops and paratroopers are distinguished by black berets. Special forces wear distinctive camouflage uniforms with green berets.

== See also ==
- List of wars involving Bolivia
