= 1984 Bolivian coup attempt =

Failed coup against President Siles Zuazo

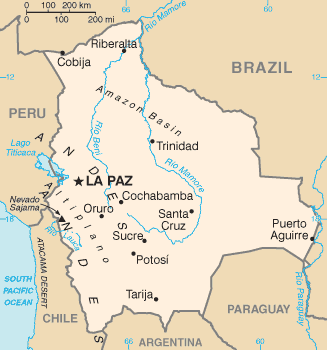
Date	June 30, 1984
Location	La Paz, Bolivia
Result	Failed coup: President Hernan Siles Zuazo released from captivity; Coup plotters granted asylum or arrested

Belligerents
Government of Bolivia	(Bolivia) Dissident faction of the army and police officers

Commanders and leaders
(Bolivia) Hernan Siles Zuazo	(Bolivia) Celso Campos Pinto (Bolivia) Rolando Saravia (Bolivia) German Linares (Bolivia) Carlos Barriga (Bolivia) Julio Vargas

Units involved
Unknown	(Bolivia) Mobile Police Unit for Rural Areas (UMOPAR)

Strength
Unknown	60

The 1984 Bolivian coup attempt was a failed coup d'état in Bolivia by a group of 60 right-wing military and police officers along with parts of the US-funded narcotics unit Mobile Police Unit for Rural Areas (UMOPAR). The coup attempt was led by Lieutenant Celso Campos Pinto, Colonel Rolando Saravia, German Linares, Carlos Barriga, and Julio Vargas.

In the initial hours of the coup attempt, Bolivian President Hernan Siles Zuazo was abducted from the presidential palace, being held at gunpoint for nine to ten hours before being released unharmed. The kidnappers, failing to gain the support of the broader armed forces, negotiated the release of the president with government officials and US diplomats. As part of the negotiated agreement, six of the coup plotters were taken to the Argentine Embassy while another seven sought asylum in the Venezuelan Embassy. Following the failed coup, about 50 people were arrested.

== Coup attempt ==
At 5:30 am on June 30, 1984, a dissident faction of army and police officers numbering sixty abducted Bolivian President Hernan Siles Zuazo. The Bolivian president, kidnapped at dawn from his bedroom in the presidential palace, was forced into a vehicle and taken to a warehouse in a La Paz suburb, where he was held at gunpoint for nine to ten hours. During his absence, the center-left civilian coalition cabinet continued to govern the country.

The Mobil Unit of Rural Patrol (UMOPAR), also known as the Leopardos, took part in the coup attempt due to frustrations with their prolonged inaction. Despite being well-trained by the US Drug Enforcement Administration (DEA) and equipped by the United States as part of a $5 million deal with the Bolivian government, the unit was confined to their barracks due to long-standing rivalries between the police and military, leading to increasing frustration and thus their eventual participation in the coup attempt.

The coup leaders included Lieutenant Celsio Campos Pinto, Colonel Rolando Saravia, and three high-ranking UMOPAR officers – German Linares, Carlos Barriga, and Julio Vargas.

The army, perhaps due to being too politically divided among themselves and reluctant, did not partake in the coup attempt. Instead, the Military High Command denounced the abduction, and senior military officials supported the country's constitution and democratic process. Seeing that they had failed to gain the support of the broader armed forces, the coup plotters negotiated the release of the president, seeking political asylum with no mention of ransom. With the help of US diplomats, they struck a deal with government officials and secured leniency. Six of the coup plotters were taken to the Argentine Assembly while another seven sought asylum in the Venezuelan Embassy.

When President Siles returned from his captivity, he was cheered and embraced by aides, relatives, cabinet members, senior military officials, and labor union leaders. He later appeared on the balcony of the presidential palace and reassured the public of unity and strength.

Following the coup attempt, the United States denounced the coup attempt, denied any involvement, and affirmed their support for Bolivia's democratic process, with Ambassador Edwin G. Corr publicly reassuring US support to the country. The Leopards, for their part in the attempted coup, were confined to their barracks, and around 50 people were arrested, including members of past military cabinets and the right-wing Nationalist Democratic Action party.
