= Plaza Murillo =

Central plaza of La Paz, Bolivia

Coordinates: 16°29′45″S 68°08′01″W

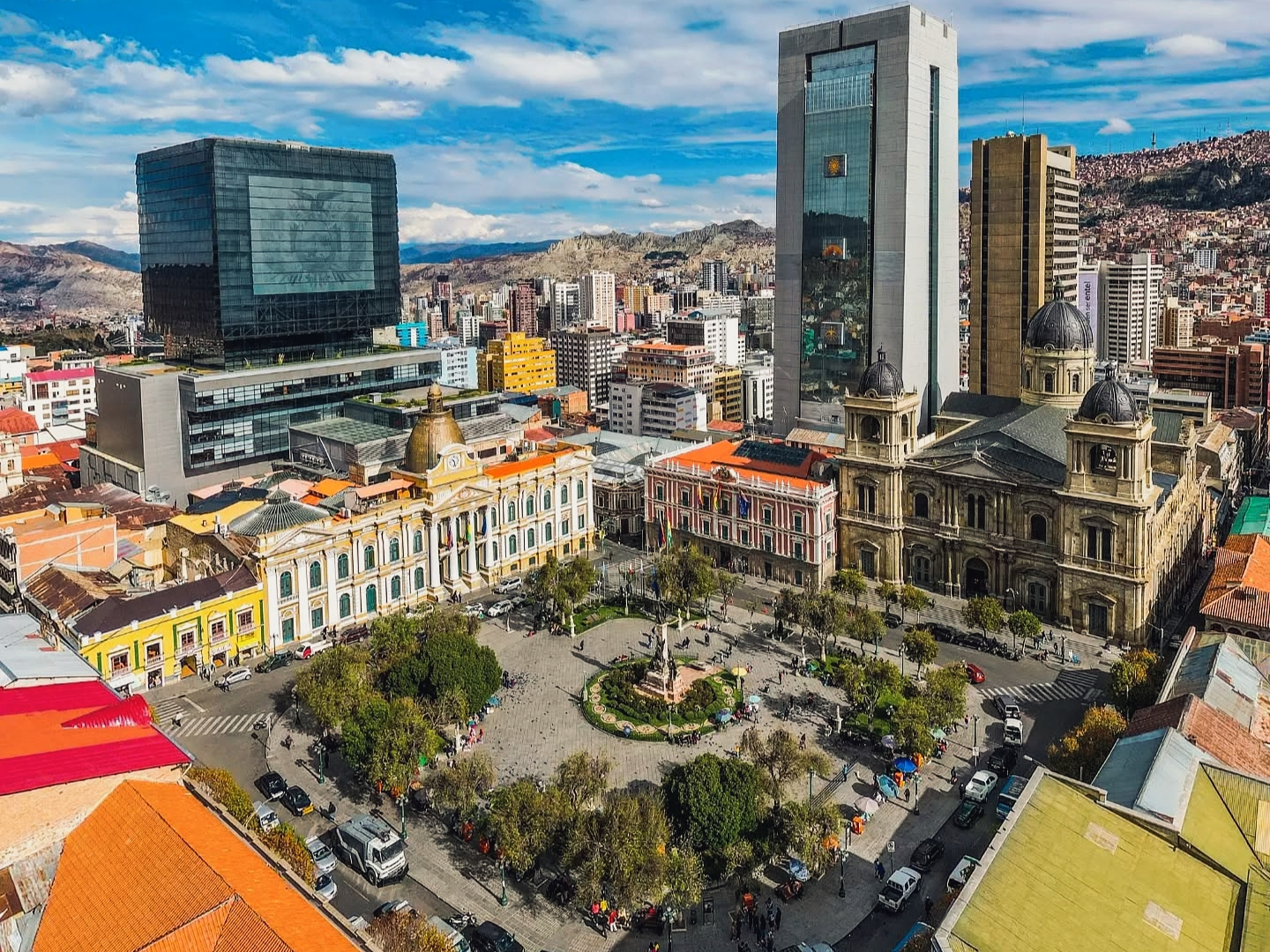
View of Plaza Murillo looking towards Plurinational Legislative Assembly

The Plaza Murillo is the central plaza of the city of La Paz and the open space most connected to the political life of Bolivia. Prominent buildings on the plaza include the Palacio Quemado, the Casa Grande del Pueblo, Plurinational Legislative Assembly of Bolivia, and the Cathedral of La Paz (or more formally, the Cathedral Basilica of Our Lady of Peace, La Paz). It is located in the old town, or Casco Viejo, of the city and is surrounded by Socabaya Street to the west, Ayacucho Street to the east, Comercio Street to the south, and a continuation of Ingavi and Ballivan Streets to the north.

== Names ==
The Plaza was originally named the Plaza Mayor (Greatest/Main Plaza) after its construction. It was later known during the colonial period as the Plaza de Armas. Following independence, it was renamed the 16 July Plaza (Plaza 16 de Julio) on 3 February 1902, in honor of Pedro Murillo, captured and hanged by Spanish troops in January 1810.

== History ==
The plaza was designed in 1558 as part of the rectilinear grid of La Paz by Juan Gutiérrez Paniagua, who was appointed by Corregidor Ignacio de Aranda, to order the city on the north bank of the Choqueyapu River. This region of the city was opposite the existing Spanish settlement, which had numbered about 200 Spaniards with some 5,000 tributary indigenous residents. The Plaza Mayor quickly supplanted the previous central square of the Spaniards, which is now called Plaza Alonso de Mendoza. Colonial buildings that were built surrounding the plaza include the Cabildo (or city government building, including a jail), a building of the Society of Jesus, the Cathedral, the Royal Treasury (Cajas Reales), and the Bishop's Residence (Casa Obispal).

The plaza has been a key site for battles for political power in Bolivia. It was fought over or defended in numerous revolutionary conflicts, including in 1809, 1811, 1814, 1862, 1865, 1871, 1898, 1946, 1952, and 2002. Independence era leaders Pedro Domingo Murillo, Juan Antonio Figueroa, Basilio Catacora, Buenaventura Bueno, Melchor Jiménez, Mariano Graneros, Apolinar Jaén, Gregorio García Lanza, Juan Bautista Sagárnaga, Juan Cordero and Simona Manzaneda were all killed on or near the plaza. In the 1946 uprising against Gualberto Villarroel, he was hanged from a lamppost in the plaza.
