= School of condors =

The School of Condors (Escuela de Condores) is a Bolivian army special forces school opened in March 1981. The brainchild of Bolivian President/Dictator General Luis García Meza Tejada, it was formed in response to the temporary exclusion of Bolivia from the United States School of the Americas due to the García Meza regime's drug trafficking efforts. The school continued to exist after relations with the United States improved after the end of Tejado's reign. The school closely followed the model of the United States School of the Americas. It trained soldiers for operations in counter-terrorism and hostage rescue in the Polivalente special forces unit.

"La Escuela de Cóndores" is located in Sanandita, Tarija in southern Bolivia.
