= Kojak (vehicle) =

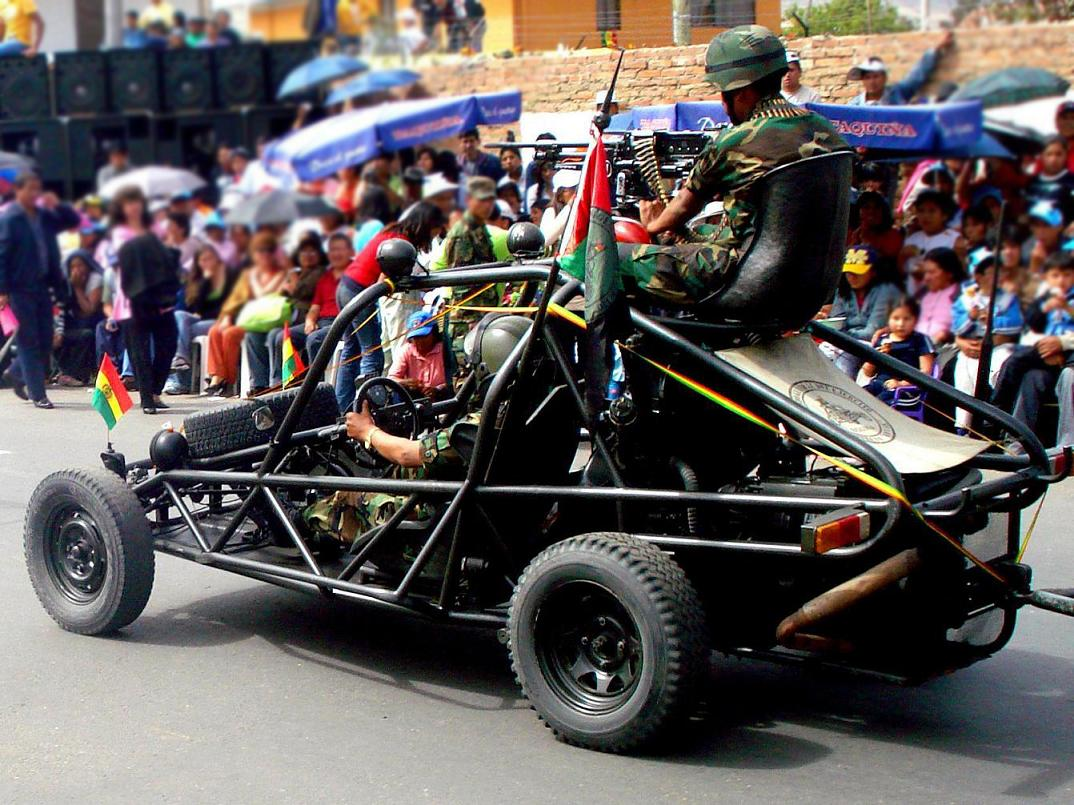
- Kojak rapid tactical reconnaissance vehicle, seen in Bolivia during the Cochabamba military parade.
- Type: Rapid multipurpose
- Place of origin: Bolivia

Specifications
- Length: 3
- Crew: 3 (gunner, loader or copilot, and driver)

The Kojak is a multipurpose military vehicle. These are made in Bolivia, with variants such as tank hunters with guided missiles, or infantry support with multiple 70mm rocket launchers.

Prototypes were developed in 1995 and 1997 to compare performance and experiment with them in tactical exercises. They were officially released in October 2005. This all began at the initiative of Col. Cornejo while he was commanding a logistics battalion, later passing on to the Division of Military Science and Technology.

They are also used as vehicles for the insertion and extraction of Special Forces operators, as well as for reconnaissance and patrol, forward observation of fires and artillery, communication and liaison. They have proven to be excellent vehicles, functioning with a great variety of armaments. They also have a low profile and good camouflage making them difficult outside the 4 km range of their missile, which has been proven in military exercises.

== Naming ==
The name of this vehicle was inspired by the famous police serial Kojak of the 1970s. As the titular investigator of the series was bald, and the Kojak has no fuselage, the name was chosen for the vehicle.

== Users ==
- Bolivia, for national use.
