= 7.5 cm FK 18 =

1930s towed 75 mm field gun of German origin

7.5 cm Feldkanone 18
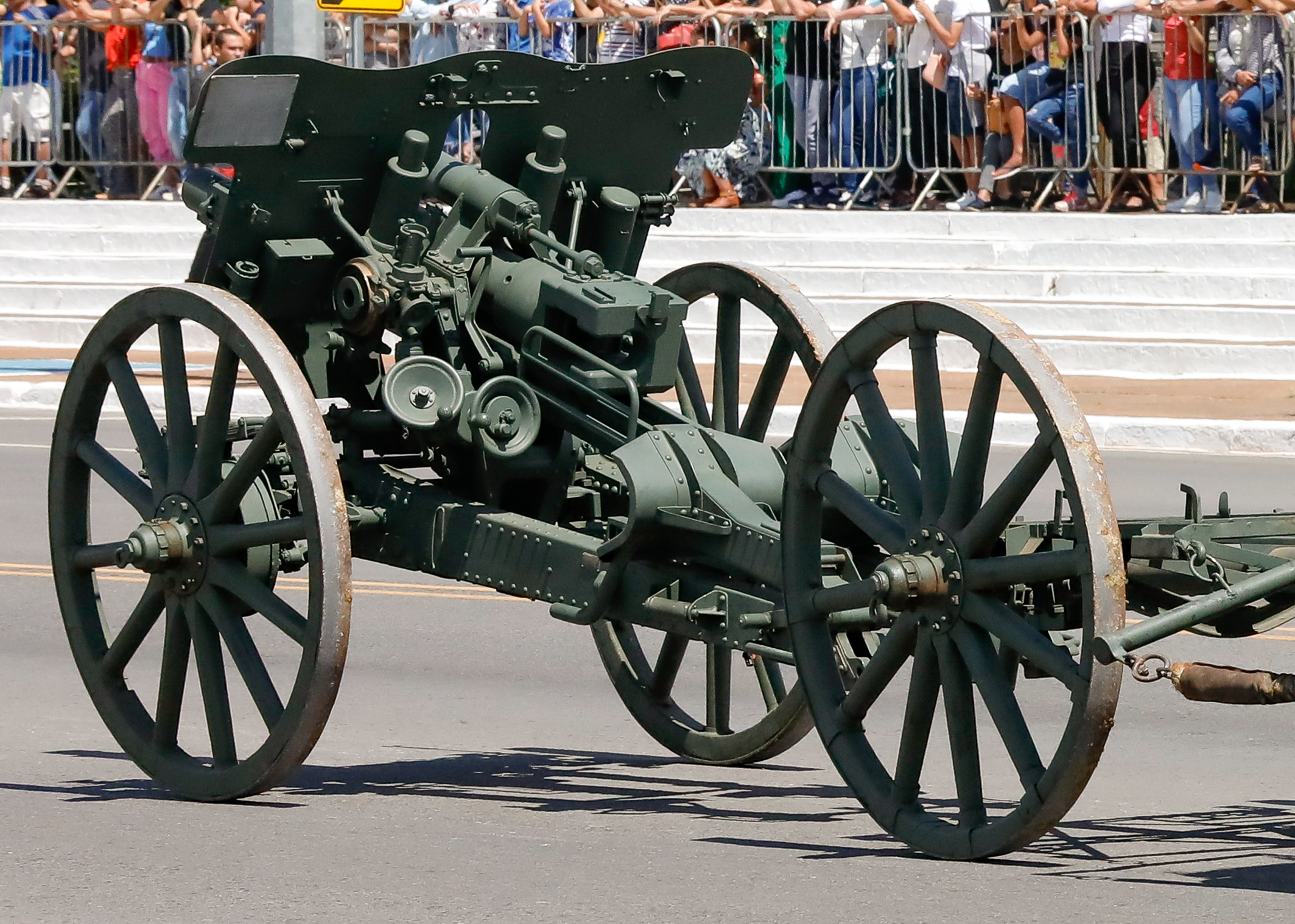
- Export version on a Brazilian parade
- Type: Field gun
- Place of origin: Germany

Service history
- In service: 1938–45
- Used by: Nazi Germany
- Wars: World War II

Production history
- Designer: Krupp
- Produced: 1938–40

Specifications
- Mass: 1,120 kg (2,649 lbs)
- Barrel length: 1.94 metres (6 ft 4 in)
- Shell: separate-loading, cased-charge and projectile 75 x 260mm R
- Shell weight: 5.83 kilograms (12.9 lb) (HE); 6.8 kilograms (15 lb) (AP)
- Caliber: 75 mm (2.95 in)
- Breech: horizontal sliding-block
- Recoil: hydro-pneumatic
- Carriage: split trail
- Elevation: -5° to +45°
- Traverse: 60°
- Rate of fire: 8–10 rpm
- Muzzle velocity: 485 m/s (1,591 ft/s)
- Maximum firing range: 9,425 m (10,307 yds)
- Filling: TNT
- Filling weight: 0.52 kilograms (1.1 lb)

The 7.5 cm Feldkanone 18 (7.5 cm FK 18) was a field gun used by Germany in World War II. It was designed to replace the 7.5 cm FK 16 nA, a World War I-era 7.7 cm FK 16 rebarreled in 75 mm during the early Thirties. The development of the FK 18 had a low priority, and it was not until 1938 that the gun was issued to the Heer.

== Design ==
The FK 18 was significantly lighter than the older gun, but was otherwise an unimpressive weapon. It used a modern split trail carriage, with the rear section and spades folding upwards for travel. It used the typical German recoil system, where the hydraulic buffer was housed in the cradle underneath the barrel and the hydro-pneumatic recuperator in a cylinder above the barrel. For some reason, the FK 18 was unusually prone to bore damage from cartridge debris, and the barrel had to be inspected after every shot to ensure it was clear.

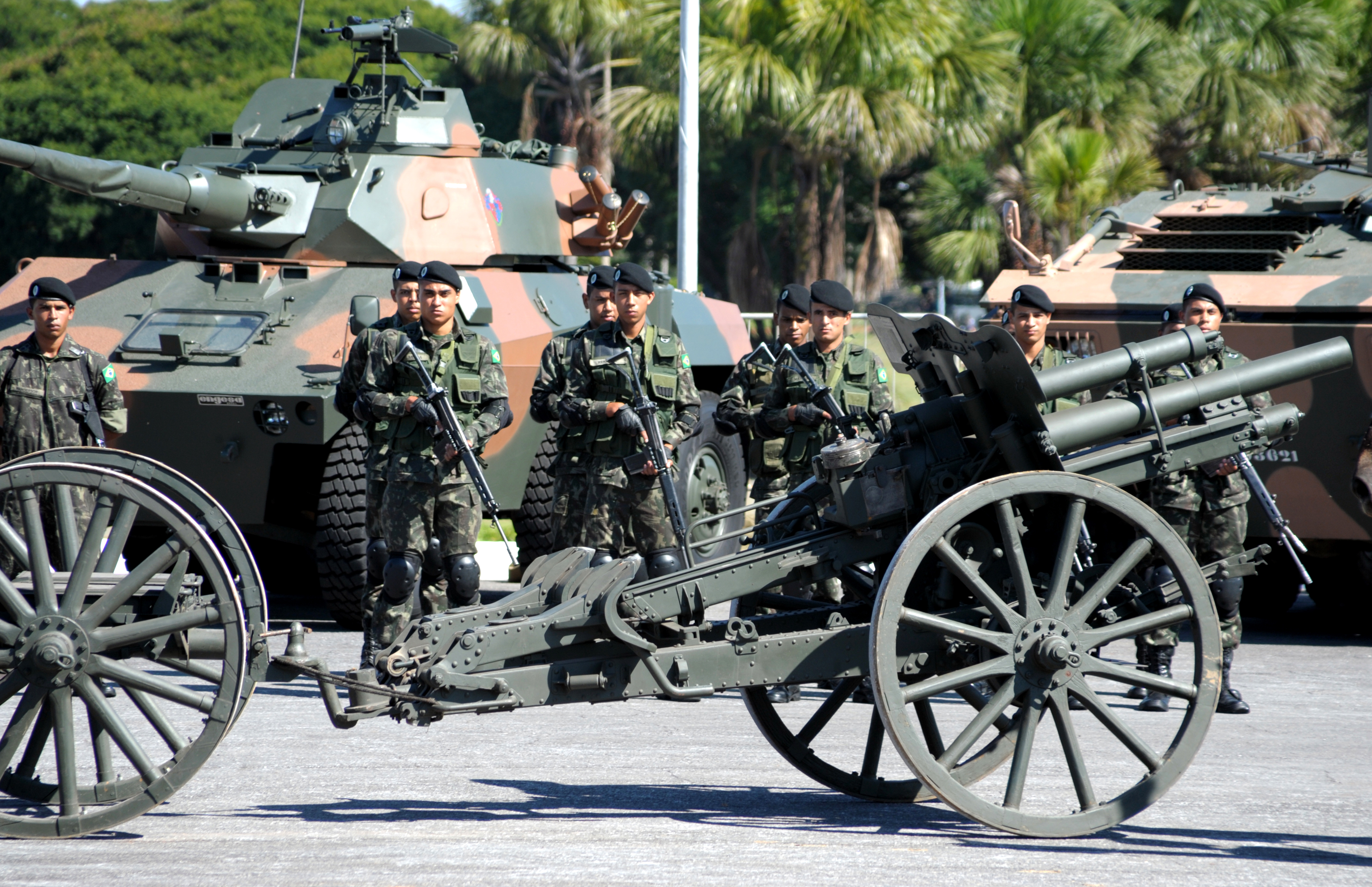
A Brazilian gun on wooden wheels with a limber draught by horses

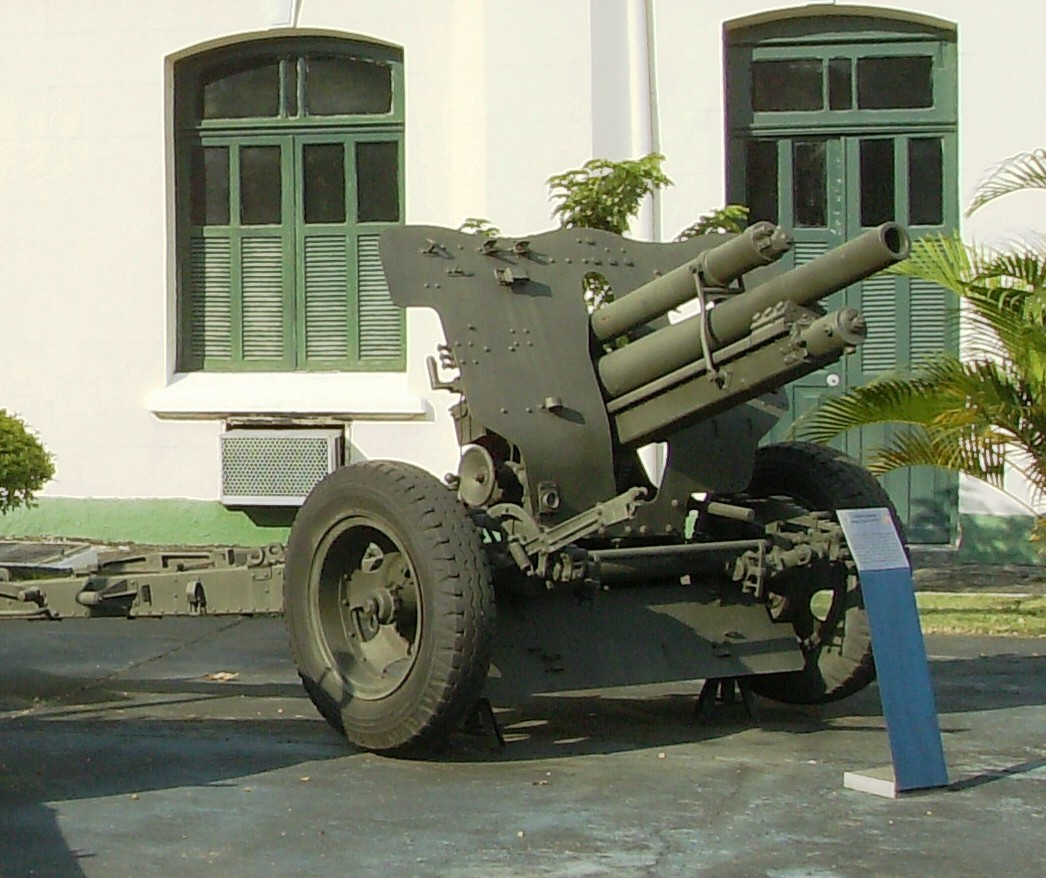
A modernized version of the gun on pneumatic tires in a Brazilian museum

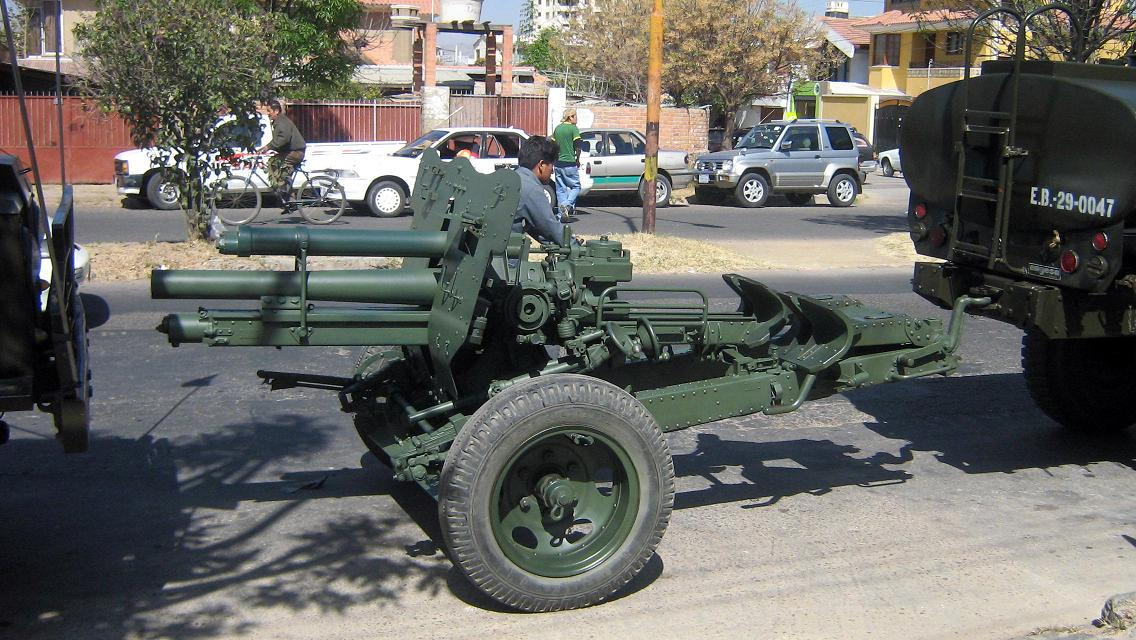
Bolivian FK 18 under tow in Cochabamba
