= Prisons in Bolivia =

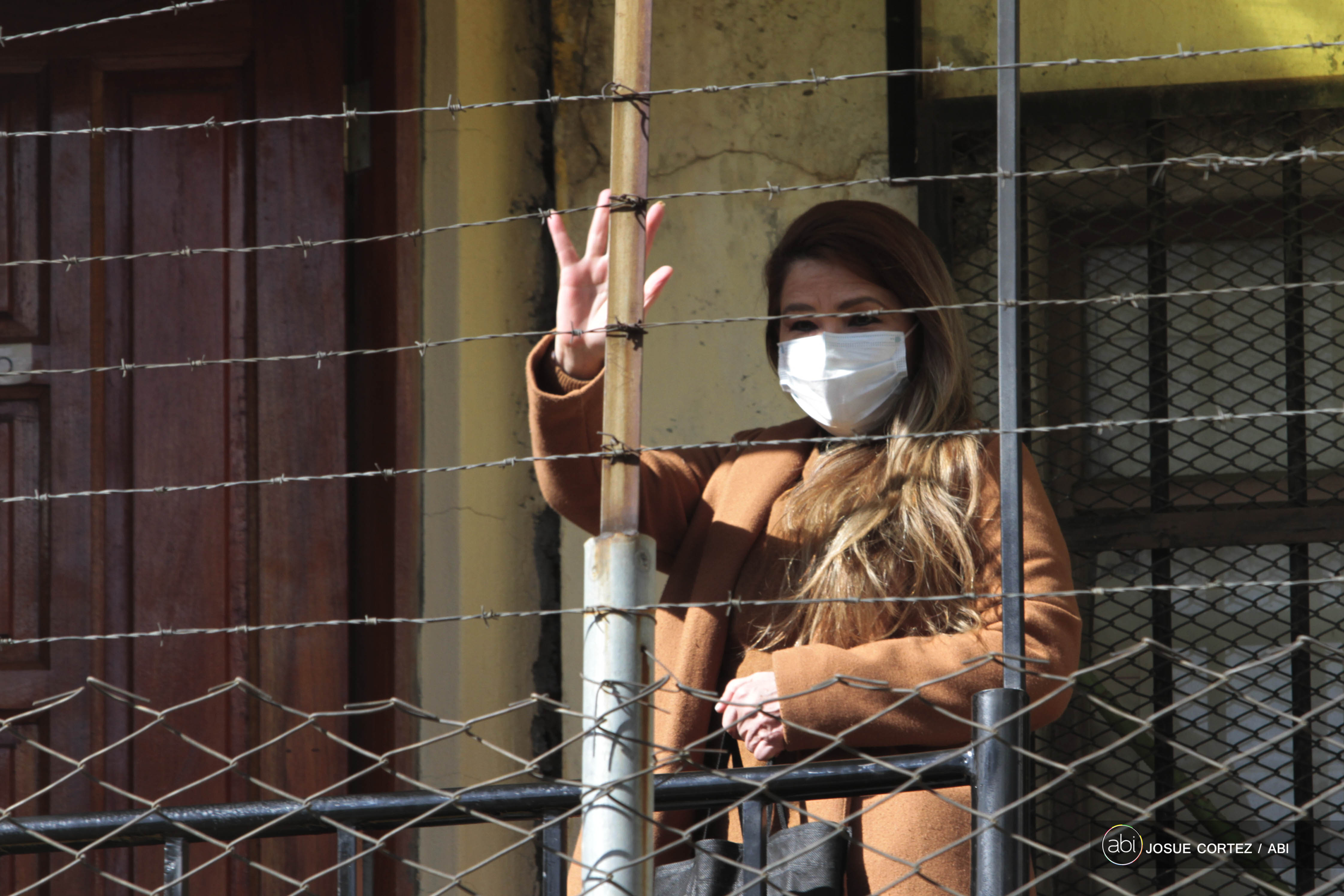
Former Bolivian president Jeanine Áñez enters the Miraflores Women's Penitentiary Center where her sentence will be read for the Coup II case, 2022.

There are 43 prisons in Bolivia which incarcerated 32,677 people as of December 2025.

The prisons are managed by the Penitentiary Regime Directorate (Spanish: Dirección de Régimen Penintenciario). There are 17 prisons in departmental capital cities (including their metropolitan regions) and 36 provincial prisons. The Defensor del Pueblo consider pre-trial detainees as people deprived of their right to liberty.

Urban prisons include San Pedro Prison and Chonchocoro Prison in La Paz, and San Sebastian Prison in Cochabamba and Palmasola Prison in Santa Cruz.

Prison	City	Department	Date founded
San Pedro Prison	La Paz	La Paz	1895
Chonchocoro Prison	La Paz	La Paz	1992
Miraflores Women's Prison	La Paz	La Paz	1997
Obrajes Women's Prison	La Paz	La Paz	1957
Qalauma Juvenile Center	Viacha	La Paz	2011
San Sebastian Prison	Cochabamba	Cochabamba	1935
San Antonio Prison	Cochabamba	Cochabamba	1988
El Abra	Cochabamba	Cochabamba	1999
San Pablo Prison (Quillacollo)	Quillacollo	Cochabamba	
San Pedro Prison (Sacaba)	Sacaba	Cochabamba	
Palmasola Prison	Santa Cruz de la Sierra	Santa Cruz	1989
Villa Busch prison	Cobija	Pando	2002
Mocoví Prison	Trinidad	Beni	1994
Morros Blancos Prison	Tarija	Tarija	1990
San Roque	Sucre	Chuquisaca	1900
Cantumarca	Potosí	Potosí	2001
San Pedro Prison (Oruro)	Oruro	Oruro	1940

== Population and overcrowding ==
The prison population is growing rapidly: reaching a recent peak of 33,058 in June 2025, with prisons 105% over their planned capacity. The total was previously around 8,700 people as of 2010; and 16,613 people as of March 2017. Approximately 55.9% of prisoners have yet to receive their sentences, and are awaiting trial in preventative detention.

Overcrowding is at a serious level, with the total prison population at over twice the capacity of the prisons. Palmasola prison is at three times its capacity of 2,762 inmates. Buena Vista, San Pedro of Oruro, and Valle Grande all have overcrowding of more than three times their capacity, as do the smaller prisons of Camargo and Guayaramerín.

An investigative survey by the Defensor del Pueblo of 20 rural prisons found that they lack the basic infrastructure necessary to function humanely. Due to the overcrowding of prisons in Bolivia and as part of a program that aims to spread literacy, inmates have now access to a small library where they can read books to reduce their jail time.

== Prisoners' rights ==
Bolivian prisons are overcrowded, dilapidated, and lawless, and food supplies and medical care are almost invariably insufficient. Generally, prison officials only control the “outer security perimeter” of these institutions, while the interior is under the control of prisoners themselves, with inmates directing gang activity from behind bars. There is ample violence in Bolivian prisons involving both prisoners and prison officials, and corruption on the part of wardens and guards is widespread. Well-off inmates can arrange for improved living conditions, more liberal visiting rules, shorter prison terms, and transfer to better prisons. Some prisoners have been known to suffer from diseases such as tuberculosis. Prisoners are routinely able to obtain drugs and alcohol, and in some cases children are used as drug couriers. Juvenile offenders are often imprisoned alongside adults, and in at least one prison men and women are confined together as well. Under Bolivian law, spouses as well as children up to age six are permitted to live with a parent in prison, but in practice children up to 12 years old do so. Prisoners have the right to complain about abuses, but they rarely dare to do so for fear of retaliation.

The Defensor del Pueblo reported there were 17 violent deaths in Bolivian prisons in the first seven month of 2026, exceeding the total number in 2025.
