= Juancito Pinto =

Bolivian government program

Juancito Pinto (also known as "Bono Juancito Pinto") is a program of the government of Evo Morales in Bolivia which improves access to education by giving school vouchers to children. It is part of the state's economic policy focused on fostering social development.

It is considered a conditional cash transfer program.

The program was created by decree on October 26, 2006, establishing an annual cash grant of Bs 200 (US$28.50) for each child from 1st to 6th grade in public elementary schools. This facilitates school attendance, particularly for low-income children, by helping offset the costs of transportation, books, and uniforms. The program is named after a young drummer in the Bolivian Army who was killed in the War of the Pacific and is today regarded as a hero.

The money for Juancito Pinto comes from funds generated by the nationalization of Bolivia's hydrocarbons industry in 2006.

In June 2008, President Evo Morales modified the Decree, widening the benefit to 8th grade of elementary public schools. This modification also made the Ministry of Education responsible for the bond payment.
