= List of transgender political office-holders =

Since the 1990s, transgender individuals have been elected to public office in growing numbers, across East Asia, South Asia, Southeast Asia, Eastern Europe, Southern Europe, Northern Europe, and Western Europe. There also has been a growing number of transgender politicians in Northern America, Oceania, the Caribbean, Central America, the Southern Cone, Andean States, and Eastern South America. In the U.S. alone, from 2017 to 2025, the number of transgender politicians rose 1800% despite candidates facing obstacles in raising money for campaigns. Elsewhere, transgender politicians have been gaining prominence as well, with political allegiances "fairly spread between parties of the left, center and independents," with some noting trans politicians making clear the "importance of representation in government" to ensure adequate political participation.

== Asia ==
=== East Asia ===
Name	Office held	Tenure	Political party	Identity	Notes	Country
Maria Akasaka	Councilor of Kameoka City Council	2019	N/A, Independent	Trans woman	Described as aiming to create a place where people can speak comfortably on LGBTQ issues.	Japan
Ayako Fuchigami	Assembly member of Hokkaido Prefectural Assembly	2019–	N/A, Independent	Trans woman	Represented Sapporo's Higashi-ku ward. First openly trans person to hold a prefectural assembly position in Japan.	Japan
Tomoya Hosoda	Council member of Iruma, Saitama Prefecture	2017–2023	N/A, Independent	Trans man	Second openly transgender official in Japan after Aya Kamikawa, and first trans man to hold public office in Japan.	Japan
Tomoya Hosoda	Council member of Iruma, Saitama Prefecture	2025–	N/A, Independent	Trans man	Second openly transgender official in Japan after Aya Kamikawa, and first trans man to hold public office in Japan.	Japan
Aya Kamikawa	Assembly member of Setagaya Ward Assembly	2003–	N/A, Independent	Trans woman	Represents Tokyo’s Setagaya ward. First openly transgender person to seek or win elected office in Japan.	Japan
Audrey Tang	Taiwan Minister without Portfolio	2016–2022	N/A, Independent	Trans non-binary woman	The first transgender person and the first non-binary official in the top executive cabinet.	Taiwan
Audrey Tang	Taiwan Minister for Digital Affairs	2022–2024	N/A, Independent	Trans non-binary woman	The first transgender person and the first non-binary official in the top executive cabinet.	Taiwan

=== South Asia ===
Name	Office held	Tenure	Political party	Identity	Notes	Country
Shabnam Bano (aka Shabnam "Mausi")	Legislator of Madhya Pradesh State Legislative Assembly	2000–2003	Jeeti Jitayi Politics (Note: after 2003)	Intersex Hijra person	First transgender person to be elected to public office in India.	India
Niluka Ekanayake	Provincial governor of Central Province	2016–2018		Trans woman	First LGBTQ+ person and first trans woman to serve as provincial governor in Sri Lanka, and is considered to be the first openly transgender head of a government in the world.	Sri Lanka
Niluka Ekanayake	Governor of Sabaragamuwa Province	2018		Trans woman	First LGBTQ+ person and first trans woman to serve as provincial governor in Sri Lanka, and is considered to be the first openly transgender head of a government in the world.	Sri Lanka
Kamla Jaan	Mayor of Katni, central Madhya Pradesh	2000	N/A, Independent	Trans woman	India's first transgender mayor. In 2002, a judge in Madhya Pradesh ruled that she was legally male and could not hold an office reserved for women.	India
Kamla Kinnar (aka Kamla "Bua")	Mayor of Sagar, Madhya Pradesh	2009	N/A, Independent	Trans woman	Was later unseated on "technical grounds," like Kamla Jaan, with courts declaring that her gender identity was invalid.	India
Madhu Kinnar	Mayor of Raigarh Municipal Corporation	2015–2020	N/A, Independent	Trans woman	India's first openly transgender mayor.	India

=== Southeast Asia ===
Name	Office held	Tenure	Political party	Identity	Notes	Country
Jhane Estrella dela Cruz	Barangay captain of Iba, Hagonoy	2013-		Trans woman	First elected in 2013, still serving as of April 2026. In 2018, she was presented with an award for community service and an award recognizing Iba as the "cleanest barangay" in Bulacan.	Philippines
Kety Haji Jalla	Legislator of People's Representative Council	2009–2014	Indonesian Democratic Party of Struggle	Trans woman	Represented North Maluku.	Indonesia
Hendrika Mayora Victoria	Legislator of Habi Village Representative Council	2021–	N/A, Independent	Trans woman	First transgender Indonesian to "hold public office."	Indonesia
Ruvic Rea	Barangay captain of Angeles Zone 4	2001-c. 2006		Trans woman	While serving as village chief, she was sexually assaulted by two other local officials. She later moved to the UK. Reportedly the first openly transgender woman to hold political office in the Philippines.	Philippines
Geraldine B. Roman	Representative of Congress of the Philippines	2016–2025	Liberal Party (2015–2017)	Trans woman	First trans person elected to the Congress of the Philippines.	Philippines
Geraldine B. Roman	Representative of Congress of the Philippines	2016–2025	Partido Demokratiko Pilipino (2017–2020)	Trans woman	First trans person elected to the Congress of the Philippines.	Philippines
Geraldine B. Roman	Representative of Congress of the Philippines	2016–2025	Lakas–CMD (2020–present)	Trans woman	First trans person elected to the Congress of the Philippines.	Philippines
Hazreen Shaik Daud	Political secretary of Penang State Legislative Assembly	2013–	Democratic Action Party	Trans woman	Political secretary of Teh Yee Cheu from the Democratic Action Party, representing Tanjung Bungah, and described "first transgender in politics" in Malaysia.	Malaysia
Yollada Suanyot	Representative of Provincial Administration Organization of Nan Province	2012	N/A, Independent	Trans woman	Represents Mueang Nan District and described as "one of Thailand's more famous transgender cover girls...[and] the country's highest-ranking transexual politician."	Thailand
Tanwarin Sukkhapisit	MP of House of Representatives	2019–2022	Future Forward Party (2018–2020)	Kathoey	First openly transgender MP in the House of Representatives in Thailand.	Thailand
Tanwarin Sukkhapisit	MP of House of Representatives	2019–2022	Move Forward Party	Kathoey	First openly transgender MP in the House of Representatives in Thailand.	Thailand
Rania Zara Medina	Trans health consultant of Country Coordinating Mechanism committee	2021–		Trans woman	Appointed by Ministry of Health Malaysia, with appointment remaining despite pushback.	Malaysia

== Europe ==
=== Central Europe ===
Name	Office held	Tenure	Political party	Identity	Notes	Country
Anna Grodzka	MP of Sejm	2011–2015	Your Movement	Trans woman	Described as "only trans parliament member" in the world at the time of her election.	Poland
Anna Grodzka	MP of Sejm	2011–2015	The Greens	Trans woman	Described as "only trans parliament member" in the world at the time of her election.	Poland

=== Southern Europe ===
Name	Office held	Tenure	Political party	Identity	Notes	Country
Carla Antonelli	Member of Assembly of Madrid	2011–2021	Spanish Socialist Workers' Party (1997–2022)	Trans woman	First openly trans person to be elected to the Cortes Generales, as well as the first openly trans person to serve in a regional legislature in Spain.	Spain
Carla Antonelli	Member of Assembly of Madrid	2023–	Más Madrid (2023–)	Trans woman	First openly trans person to be elected to the Cortes Generales, as well as the first openly trans person to serve in a regional legislature in Spain.	Spain
Carla Antonelli	Senator of Senate of Spain	2023–	Sumar (2023–)	Trans woman	First openly trans person to be elected to the Cortes Generales, as well as the first openly trans person to serve in a regional legislature in Spain.	Spain
Marcella Di Folco	Municipal councilor in Bologna	1995–1998	Federation of the Greens	Trans woman	Described as a "transgender icon," she was the first open trans woman to hold a political public office in the world.	Italy
Jimena González	Member of Assembly of Madrid	2023–	Más Madrid	Trans woman	Elected in 2023, she was first transgender person to run for election under a preferred given name rather than a legal given name during her first, and filed, electoral run in 2021.	Spain
Vladimir Luxuria	MP in Chamber of Deputies	2006–2008	Communist Refoundation Party	Trans woman	Represented Lazio 1 constituency and first openly transgender MP in Europe.	Italy
Porpora Marcasciano	Municipal councilor in Bologna	2021	Civic Coalition – Courageous Ecologist Solidarity	Trans woman	She was elected as part of the majority. On November 11, 2021, she was elected President of the Equal Opportunities Commission of the Bologna City Council.	Italy
Gianmarco Negri	Mayor of Tromello, Province of Pavia	2019		Trans man	First transgender mayor elected in Italy.	Italy
Monica Romano	Municipal councilor in Milan	2021	Democratic Party	Trans woman	First transgender councilor in Milan.	Italy
Manuela Trasobares	Town Councilor in Geldo	2007	Democratic Republican Action	Trans woman	First trans person, in Spain, that was elected.	Spain

=== Northern Europe ===
Name	Office held	Tenure	Political party	Identity	Notes	Country
Tom Atkin-Withers	Sheffield City Councillor	2026–	Green Party of England and Wales	Non-Binary		United Kingdom
Lina Axelsson Kihlblom	Minister for Schools in Andersson cabinet	2021–2022	Swedish Social Democratic Party	Trans woman	First transgender cabinet minister in Swedish history.	Sweden
Jenny Bailey	Cambridge City Councillor, East Chesterton Ward	2002–2008	Liberal Democrats	Trans woman		United Kingdom
Jenny Bailey	Mayor of Cambridge	2007–2008	Liberal Democrats	Trans woman	First transgender mayor in the United Kingdom. Bailey herself was keen to play down the significance of her appointment, saying, "I don't want to let it define me."	United Kingdom
Helen Clare Belcher	Wiltshire Councillor	2021–	Liberal Democrats	Trans woman	Elected in 2021, and a British transgender activist.	United Kingdom
Little Brighouse	Powys County Councillor	2022-	Liberal Democrats (May 2022)	Trans-nonbinary	Elected in 2022 as a Liberal Democrat, but soon after was suspended by the party pending investigation into content regarding Palestine on social media. Brighouse identifies as "trans-nonbinary," according the Brecon and Radnor Express.	United Kingdom
Little Brighouse	Powys County Councillor	2022-	Non-affiliated (2022-present)	Trans-nonbinary	Elected in 2022 as a Liberal Democrat, but soon after was suspended by the party pending investigation into content regarding Palestine on social media. Brighouse identifies as "trans-nonbinary," according the Brecon and Radnor Express.	United Kingdom
Violet Bonetta	East Devon District Councillor	2023–	Labour Party	Trans woman	First trans councillor and youngest Councillor elected to council of East Evan District, with Bonetta saying she was "immensely proud" to have the position.	United Kingdom
Alexandra Briem	President of Reykjavík City Council	2021–	Pirate Party	Trans woman	First trans council leader in Reykjavík and first trans person to hold political office in Iceland.	Iceland
Sarah Brown	Cambridge City Councillor, Petersfield	2010–2014	Liberal Democrats	Trans woman	Was the first openly transgender politician in the U.K. "for several years" and campaigned for trans rights.	United Kingdom
Charlie Caine	Norwich City Councillor	2024-	Green Party of England and Wales	Gay trans man	Identifies as a gay trans man, and is also a political activist and founder of Labour Campaign For Trans Rights.	United Kingdom
Rachel Clarke	Torridge District Councillor (2021-2023)	2021-2025	Conservative Party (2021-2022)	Trans woman	Was elected as a Conservative Councillor in 2021 but came out and left her former party affiliation on the death of her wife. She has since stood as a candidate for the Liberal Democrats.	United Kingdom
Rachel Clarke	Mayor of Bideford (2024-2025)	2021-2025	Independent (2022-2025)	Trans woman	Was elected as a Conservative Councillor in 2021 but came out and left her former party affiliation on the death of her wife. She has since stood as a candidate for the Liberal Democrats.	United Kingdom
Rachel Clarke	Mayor of Bideford (2024-2025)	2021-2025	Liberal Democrats (2025-present)	Trans woman	Was elected as a Conservative Councillor in 2021 but came out and left her former party affiliation on the death of her wife. She has since stood as a candidate for the Liberal Democrats.	United Kingdom
Iris Duane	Member of Scottish Parliament from Glasgow	2026-present	Scottish Greens	Trans woman	With Dr Q Manivannan, became one of the first two transgender MSPs when elected in 2026.	United Kingdom
Sarah Fanet	Member of The Highland Council for Fort William & Ardnamurchan	2021–2025	Scottish National Party	Trans woman	Serving on the Highland Council, she was the first transgender councillor in the Highlands.	United Kingdom
Elaine Gallagher	Glasgow City Councillor	2022–	Scottish Greens	Trans woman	First trans councillor for Glasgow who hoped, after she was elected, that it would indicate that transgender people should not be seen as a threat.	United Kingdom
Osh Gantly	London Borough of Islington Councillor	2014-2022	Labour Party	Trans woman	First transgender councillor for the Labour Party in Islington, representing Highbury East.	United Kingdom
Raphael Hill	Brighton and Hove City Councillor	2023–	Green Party of England and Wales	Trans woman	First transgender councillor for Brighton.	United Kingdom
Tammy Hymas	London Borough of Haringey Councillor	2023–2025	Labour Party	Trans woman	Represented St Ann's ward and first trans councillor, for the Labour Party, in Haringey, and later said she faced "abuse and threats for being a transgender woman in politics."	United Kingdom
Zoë Kirk-Robinson	Bolton Councillor for Westhoughton North and Chew Moor	2016–2019	Conservative Party	Trans woman	In 2016, criticized a Labour Party member for misgendering her during a council meeting, reporting it to the police as hate crime.	United Kingdom
Jenny Knight	Norwich City Councillor	2025 -	Green Party of England and Wales	Trans woman	City and County Councillor in Sewell Ward/Division, Chair of the Trans Greens, Norwich City Cabinet Member for Culture and Wellbeing.	United Kingdom
Kira Lewis	London Borough of Waltham Forest Councillor	2022-	Labour Party	Non-binary	Resigned a cabinet office following a petition after her social media post calling Hamas "no good for Palestinians and no good for Jews," claiming the organization "wants a fundamentalist Muslim dictatorship on the land from the river to the sea, devoid of all Jews" and called Hamas "evil," adding that Israeli bombardment in Gaza is bad "but not evil." She identifies as transgender and non-binary.	United Kingdom
Kira Lewis	London Borough of Waltham Forest Councillor	2022-	Labour Party	Trans	Resigned a cabinet office following a petition after her social media post calling Hamas "no good for Palestinians and no good for Jews," claiming the organization "wants a fundamentalist Muslim dictatorship on the land from the river to the sea, devoid of all Jews" and called Hamas "evil," adding that Israeli bombardment in Gaza is bad "but not evil." She identifies as transgender and non-binary.	United Kingdom
Dr Q Manivannan	Member of Scottish Parliament from Edinburgh and Lothians East	2026-present	Scottish Greens	Trans non-binary	With Iris Duane, became one of the first two transgender MSPs when elected in 2026.	United Kingdom
Rosalind Mitchell	Bristol City Councillor	1997–1999	Labour Party (1982–2010)	Trans woman	In September 1997, while a serving member of Bristol City Council, she announced her intention to transition and was the first British politician to do so while holding elected office.	United Kingdom
Mia Mulder	Councillor of Sollentuna	2022–2025	Left Party	Bisexual trans woman	Elected in 2022, and noted on social media, in June 2020, that she is bisexual.	Sweden
Anwen Muston	City of Wolverhampton Council for East Park	2016–2024	Labour Party	Trans woman	First openly transgender woman to be elected as a Labour representative.	United Kingdom
Gregor Murray	Dundee Councillor	2017-2022	Scottish National Party	Non-binary transgender	Elected in 2017, afterwards left politics citing pressures associated with social media. Was the first, and, at the time, only openly transgender politician in Scotland.	United Kingdom
Chris Northwood	Manchester City Councillor	2023–	Liberal Democrats	Trans woman	Said on social media that she was elected "with a majority of 335."	United Kingdom
Zoe O'Connell	Cambridge City Councillor, Trumpington Ward	2015–2019	Liberal Democrats	Trans woman	Prominent campaigner for transgender rights who is in a polyamorous relationship with Sarah Brown and Sylvia Knight (Sarah's wife).	United Kingdom
Tanya-Jayne Park	Eastleigh Councillor	2021–	Liberal Democrats	Trans woman	Describes herself as a "fifty something transwoman entrepreneur." Elected to the council in 2021, under the name "Tanya Park."	United Kingdom
Hannah Phillips	Lymington and Pennington Town Councillor	2023–	Liberal Democrats	Trans woman	Phillips has been the target of significant harassment and receives regular death threats.	United Kingdom
Mark Rees	Tunbridge Wells Borough Councillor	1994-1998	Liberal Democrats	Trans man	Having been denied access to ordained ministry by the Church of England on account of him being legally female, he worked throughout the 1970s, 80s, and 90s for transgender rights in the UK. Likely the first openly transgender man to be elected to public office in the UK.	United Kingdom
Kaz Self	Bristol City Councillor	2024–	Labour Party	Trans woman	First openly transgender woman to be elected as a Bristol councillor.	United Kingdom
Nikki Sinclaire	MEP for West Midlands	2009–2014	UK Independence Party (until 2010)	Lesbian trans woman	First ever trans British parliamentarian, coming out in 2013. Previously, in 2004, Sinclaire came out as lesbian in a letter to the LGBTQ newspaper The Pink Paper.	United Kingdom
Nikki Sinclaire	MEP for West Midlands	2009–2014	We Demand a Referendum Now (2012–2014)	Lesbian trans woman	First ever trans British parliamentarian, coming out in 2013. Previously, in 2004, Sinclaire came out as lesbian in a letter to the LGBTQ newspaper The Pink Paper.	United Kingdom
Tania Stevenson	Ockbrook and Borrowash Parish Councillor	2023–	Independent	Trans woman	First trans councillor for Borrowash.	United Kingdom
Dylan Tippetts	Plymouth City Councillor	2022–2025	Labour Party (2022–2025)	Trans man	Following his election he said that he hoped that it would help "dial down hate and division."	United Kingdom
Dylan Tippetts	Plymouth City Councillor	2022–2025	Liberal Democrats (2025–)	Trans man	Following his election he said that he hoped that it would help "dial down hate and division."	United Kingdom
Katie Wallis	MP for Bridgend	2019–2024	Conservative Party	Trans woman	Come as transgender in 2022.	United Kingdom
Alexandra Ward-Slotte	Councillor in the municipality of Stenungsund	2019	Moderates	Trans woman	Member of West Pride Board, pushed for improvements for lives of trans people including in healthcare.	Sweden
Rachael Webb	London Borough of Lambeth Councillor	1986-1994	Labour Party	Trans woman	A lorry driver and Transport and General Workers Union activist, she represented Ferndale ward and afterwards Gipsy Hill. Reportedly, the first openly transgender individual to be elected in the UK.	United Kingdom
Isla Wrathmell	Lambeth London Borough Councillor	2022–	Labour Party	Trans woman	Described herself as a proud trans woman who was standing with her "Labour colleagues to support a ban on conversion therapy for trans people."	United Kingdom

=== Western Europe ===
Name	Office held	Tenure	Political party	Identity	Notes	Country
Victoria Broßart	MP of Bundestag	2025–	Alliance 90/The Greens	Trans woman	Third openly transgender person elected to the German parliament after Nyke Slawik and Tessa Ganserer.	Germany
Marie Cau	Mayor of Tilloy-lez-Marchiennes	2020–2025		Trans woman	First openly transgender mayor in France.	France
Camille Cabral	Councilor of the 17th arrondissement of Paris	2001–2008	The Greens	Trans woman	First trans woman to be elected in the history of the French Republic.	France
Petra De Sutter	Member of Belgian Senate	2014–2019	Groen	Lesbian trans woman	First candidate, on a Belgian election list, who was openly transgender, and asserted that trans woman can, unlike other individuals, understand "the sensitivities of both genders and can therefore be good diplomats and, hence, politicians" and noted she is a lesbian.	Belgium
Petra De Sutter	MEP for Belgium	2019–2020	Groen	Lesbian trans woman	Recognized for her work as an MEP on sexual and reproductive rights.	Belgium
Petra De Sutter	Belgian Minister for Civil Service, Public Enterprises, Telecommunication and Postal Services	2020–2025	Groen	Lesbian trans woman	Europe's first transgender deputy prime minister, and the most senior trans politician in Europe when sworn in 2020.	Belgium
Petra De Sutter	Deputy Prime Minister of Belgium	2020–2025	Groen	Lesbian trans woman	Europe's first transgender deputy prime minister, and the most senior trans politician in Europe when sworn in 2020.	Belgium
Tessa Ganserer	Member of Landtag of Bavaria	2013–2021	The Greens	Trans woman	Representing Middle Franconia. Came out as trans in 2018, becoming the first openly transgender person in a German state or federal parliament.	Germany
Tessa Ganserer	MP of Bundestag	2021–2025	Alliance 90/The Greens	Trans woman	Representing Bavaria, and because her government records remain unchanged, she was forced to appear on the ballot under her deadname.	Germany
Lilian Haak	Municipal councillor for Apeldoorn	2018–		Trans woman	One of first four transgender councillors elected, in the Netherlands, in 2018, with the others being Michelle van Doorn, Sophie Schers, and Corine van Dun, and transitioned in 2014.	Netherlands
Felix Reda	MEP	2014–2019	Pirate Party	Trans man	Transitioned after leaving office, coming out as trans in January 2022.	Germany
Christian Schenk	MP of Bundestag	1990–2002	Independent Women's Association Party	Trans man	Transitioned after leaving office.	Germany
Christian Schenk	MP of Bundestag	1990–2002	Party of Democratic Socialism	Trans man	Transitioned after leaving office.	Germany
Sophie Schers	Municipal councillor for Utrecht	2018–2022	GroenLinks	Trans woman	Described herself, prior to her election, as a "lesbian trans person." On her website, she calls herself "a transgender activist and feminist,"	Netherlands
Nyke Slawik	MP of Bundestag	2021–	Alliance 90/The Greens	Trans woman	Representing North Rhine-Westphalia and she was, along with Tessa Ganserer, the first trans elected representatives to enter the Bundestag.	Germany
Michelle van Doorn	Municipal councillor for Nijmegen	2018–	Party for the Animals	Trans woman	Leader of the Party for the Animals electoral list when elected.	Netherlands
Corine van Dun	Municipal councillor for Utrecht	2018–	Democrats 66	Trans woman	One of first four transgender councillors.	Netherlands
Lisa van Ginneken	Member of the House of Representatives	2021–2023	Democrats 66	Trans woman	First transgender person to be elected into the Dutch House of Representatives, where she is her party's spokesperson for IT, privacy, family law, and mobility.	Netherlands

== Northern America ==
=== Canada ===
Name	Office held	Tenure	Political party	Identity	Notes
Estefan Cortes-Vargas	MLA of Legislative Assembly of Alberta	2015–2019	New Democratic Party	Non-binary and transgender	Represented Strathcona-Sherwood Park. First openly trans, non-binary, queer MLA in Canada.
Vivienne Horne	MLA of Legislative Assembly of Alberta	2015–2019	New Democratic Party	Bisexual trans woman	Represented Spruce Grove-St. Albert. Transitioned after leaving office.
Lyra Evans	Ottawa-Carleton District School Board Trustee	2018		Trans woman	First openly transgender school trustee in Canada and previously a candidate for member of provincial parliament in Ontario.
Amita Kuttner	Interim Leader of Green Party of Canada	2021–2022		Non-binary, trans, and pansexual	First transgender person and first person of East Asian descent to lead a federal party in Canada, who is non-binary and a pansexual astrophysicist.
Julie Lemieux	Mayor of Très-Saint-Rédempteur, Quebec	2013–		Trans woman	First openly transgender mayor in Canada.
Hadden Kelloway	Mayor of Sparwood	2026–		Trans man	First openly transgender mayor in British Columbia.
Logan Oxenham	Legislator of Legislative Assembly of Manitoba	2023–	New Democratic Party of Manitoba	Trans man	Canada's first transgender politician elected to either a provincial, territorial or federal elected office.
Teri Westerby	School Board Trustee of Chilliwack	2022		Trans man	First openly transgender person elected in British Columbia.

=== United States ===
This is a partial list of notable firsts. For a more complete list, see the main article.

Name	Office held	Tenure	Political party	Identity	Notes
Sarah McBride	Representative for Delaware, United States House of Representatives	2024–	Democratic Party	Trans woman	First transgender member of the US Congress and highest elected officeholder in the United States. Previously elected to the Delaware Senate in 2020, McBride is also the first transgender state senator in United States history.
Joanne Marie Conte	Councilor of Arvada, Colorado City Council	1991–1995	N/A, Independent	Trans woman	Perhaps the first openly transgender person to elected to public office in the U.S.
Danica Roem	Legislator of Virginia House of Delegates	2018–	Democratic Party	Trans woman	First openly transgender person to be elected and serve in a state legislature. (Note: Stacie Laughton had been elected in 2012, but resigned before being seated.) When Roem was elected to the Virginia Senate in 2024, she became the first transgender person to be elected and serve in both houses of a state legislature in the U.S. and the first transgender state senator in the Southern United States.
James Roesener	Legislator of New Hampshire House of Representatives	2022–	Democratic Party	Bisexual trans man	First openly transgender man elected to a state legislature in 2022.

== Oceania ==
Name	Office held	Tenure	Political party	Identity	Notes	Country
Georgina Beyer	Council member of Carterton District Council	1993	New Zealand Labour Party (1999–2007)	Trans woman		New Zealand
Georgina Beyer	Mayor of Carterton	1995–2000	New Zealand Labour Party (1999–2007)	Trans woman	World's first openly transgender mayor.	New Zealand
Georgina Beyer	MP of New Zealand Parliament	1999–2005	New Zealand Labour Party (1999–2007)	Trans woman	Representing Wairarapa and world's first openly transgender member of parliament.	New Zealand
Jade Darko	Councilor of Clarence City Council	2022	Green Party	Trans woman	First trans woman to have a seat on a council in Tasmania.	Australia
Jax Fox	Councilor of Hobart City Council	2018–2022	Independent	Non-binary trans woman	First elected political officeholder in Tasmania to be openly non-binary and transgender. Described themselves as an "out and proud nonbinary queer" and noted their dead name.	Australia
Jacquie Grant	Councillor of Grey District	1998–2004		Trans woman	Later became "Officer of the New Zealand Order of Merit" in 2018.	New Zealand
Paige Johnson	Councilor of Newcastle City Council	2024	Labor Party	Trans woman	First openly transgender councilor for Newcastle.	Australia

== Latin America and the Caribbean ==
=== Caribbean ===
Name	Office held	Tenure	Political party	Identity	Notes	Country
Adela Hernández	Councilor of Municipal Council of Caibarién in Ville Clara Province	2012		Trans woman	First trans woman elected to office in Cuba, said to reflect an "evolving" country.	Cuba
Tamara Adrián	MP of National Assembly of Venezuela	2015	Popular Will	Trans woman	Secondly only openly transgender member of a national legislature in the Western Hemisphere.	Venezuela
Jowelle de Souza	Senator of Senate of Trinidad and Tobago	2022–	Independent	Trans woman	First transgender parliamentarian in Caribbean history. de Souza was the first trans person to have gender reassignment surgery in the country, in 1993, at age 19.	Trinidad and Tobago

=== Central America ===
Name	Office held	Tenure	Political party	Identity	Notes	Country
María Clemente García	Deputy of Chamber of Deputies	2021–	Morena (until 2022)	Trans woman	Elected same year as another trans legislator, in Mexico, Salma Luévano.	Mexico
María Clemente García	Deputy of Chamber of Deputies	2021–	Independent	Trans woman	Elected same year as another trans legislator, in Mexico, Salma Luévano.	Mexico
Salma Luévano	Deputy of Chamber of Deputies	2021–2024	Morena	Trans woman	Elected same year as another trans legislator, in Mexico, Salma Luévano.	Mexico
Gerhard Phillip Hernández Padilla	Second Vice Mayor of the Municipality of the Canton of Moravia	2024–	Somos Moravia	Trans man	Costa Rica's first out transgender elected official.	Costa Rica

=== Southern Cone ===
Name	Office held	Tenure	Political party	Identity	Notes	Country
Zuliana Araya	Councilor of Valparaíso	2012–2016	Party for Democracy	Trans woman	Chile's first trans city council member.	Chile
Zuliana Araya	Councilor of Valparaíso	2016–2020	Party for Democracy	Trans woman	Chile's first trans city council member.	Chile
Alejandra González Pino	Councilor of Lampa	2004–2016	Independent	Trans woman	First elected transgender politician in Chile.	Chile
Alejandra González Pino	Councilor of Lampa	2004–2016	Humanist Party (after 2023)	Trans woman	First elected transgender politician in Chile.	Chile
Mara Pérez Reynoso	Diversity Area Chief of Argentina Ministry of Security	2016	Republican Proposal	Trans woman	First transgender public official in Argentina's government.	Argentina
Alba Rueda	Undersecretary of Diversity Policies of Argentina Ministry of Women, Genders and Diversity	2020–2022	Frente de Todos (2019–2023)	Trans woman	First openly transgender politician in Argentina to hold a senior governmental position.	Argentina
Emilia Schneider	MP of Chamber of Deputies	2022–	Comunes	Trans woman	Represents District 10 and first openly transgender person to be elected to the Chamber of Deputies.	Chile
Emilia Schneider	MP of Chamber of Deputies	2022–	Social Convergence (until 2024)	Trans woman	Represents District 10 and first openly transgender person to be elected to the Chamber of Deputies.	Chile
Michelle Suárez Bértora	MP of General Assembly of Uruguay	2014–2017		Trans woman	First openly transgender person elected to office in Uruguay.	Uruguay
Michelle Suárez Bértora	Senator of Senate of Uruguay	2017–2018		Trans woman	The first openly transgender senator in the nation's history, and resigned in 2017 following a criminal investigation finding her guilty of forging legal documents while working as an attorney.	Uruguay
Sandra Edith "Tía Gaucha" Tancredi	Councilor of Escobar, Buenos Aires Province	2022–2025		Trans woman	First trans councilwoman in Argentina	Argentina

=== Andean States ===
Name	Office held	Tenure	Political party	Identity	Notes	Country
París Galán	Legislator of La Paz Departmental Legislative Assembly	2015–2021	Sovereignty and Liberty (2014–2021)	Trans man and non-binary	One of just two queer people and the second gay man in Bolivia to have held political office as a lawmaker, after Manuel Canelas.	Bolivia
Matilda Gonzalez	Secretary of Women's and Gender Equality for Manizales	2020		Trans woman	Her appointment was celebrated by supporters of LGBTQ rights, but opposed by conservative groups, who demanded her resignation.	Colombia
Diane Marie Rodríguez Zambrano	Alternate member of National Assembly	2017–2021	PAIS Alliance	Trans woman	Represented Guayas Province and first trans member of the National Assembly of Ecuador.	Ecuador
Luisa Revilla	Councillor of La Esperanza	2015–2018	Movimiento Regional para el Desarrollo con Seguridad y Honradez	Trans woman	In Trujillo Province and celebrated with her election making history.	Peru

=== Eastern South America ===
Name	Office held	Tenure	Political party	Identity	Notes	Country
Dani Balbi	Deputy of Legislative Assembly of Rio de Janeiro	2022–	Communist Party of Brazil	Trans woman	First trans state deputy in Rio de Janeiro and selected as chair of the state Labour, Legislation and Social Security Committee in 2023.	Brazil
Linda Brasil	Councilor of Aracaju	2020–	Socialism and Liberty Party	Trans woman	First trans woman elected to a parliamentary position in the state of Sergipe, Brazil.	Brazil
Erika Hilton	Councilor of Municipal Chamber of São Paulo	2021–2023	Socialism and Liberty Party (2015–present)	Trans woman	First trans woman elected to the Municipal Chamber of São Paulo, receiving the most votes for any councilor in the country.	Brazil
Erika Hilton	Legislator of Chamber of Deputies	2023–	Socialism and Liberty Party (2015–present)	Trans woman	Elected alongside Duda Salabert, a trans woman, in 2022.	Brazil
Symmy Larrat	Brazil National Secretary for the Promotion and Defense of the Rights of LGBTQIA+ People	2023–	Workers' Party	Trans woman	Served as president of Associação Brasileira de Lésbicas, Gays, Bissexuais, Travestis, Transexuais e Intersexos from 2017 and 2022 and once she became National Secretary, she spoke about issues impacting trans people in Brazil, including around employment	Brazil
Robeyoncé Lima	State Deputy of Legislative Assembly of Pernambuco	2018–	Socialism and Liberty Party	Trans woman	Elected same year as Erika Hilton and Erica Malunguinho, two trans women, in other legislative positions in Brazil, and said that she, and the other legislators want to "serve as an example for other trans girls to occupy this institutional space."	Brazil
Érica Malunguinho da Silva	State Deputy of Legislative Assembly of São Paulo	2018–	Socialism and Liberty Party	Trans woman	First trans person elected to a Brazilian state legislature.	Brazil
Thammy Miranda	Councilor of Municipal Chamber of São Paulo	2021–	Brazilian Socialist Party (2018–2020)	Trans man	First trans man elected to the Municipal Chamber of São Paulo.	Brazil
Thammy Miranda	Councilor of Municipal Chamber of São Paulo	2021–	Social Democratic Party (2024–)	Trans man	First trans man elected to the Municipal Chamber of São Paulo.	Brazil
Thabatta Pimenta	Councilor of Natal, Rio Grande do Norte	2025–	Socialism and Liberty Party (2024–)	Trans woman	First trans city councilor in Natal.	Brazil
Duda Salabert	Councilor of Belo Horizonte	2021–2023	Democratic Labour Party	Trans woman	First trans city councillor elected in Belo Horizonte.	Brazil
Duda Salabert	Legislator of Federal Congress	2023–	Democratic Labour Party	Trans woman	Elected alongside a trans woman named Erika Hilton in 2022.	Brazil
Kátia Tapety	Alderwoman of Colônia do Piauí	1993–2004	Democrats (1992–2003)	Trans woman	First elected transgender politician in Brazil and later described as "city councilor of the people."	Brazil
Kátia Tapety	Vice-Mayor of Colônia do Piauí	2005–2008	Cidadania (2003–present)	Trans woman	First elected transgender politician in Brazil and later described as "city councilor of the people."	Brazil
Kátia Tapety	Vice-Mayor of Colônia do Piauí	2005–2008	Brazilian Socialist Party	Trans woman	First elected transgender politician in Brazil and later described as "city councilor of the people."	Brazil
