= Waphuri =

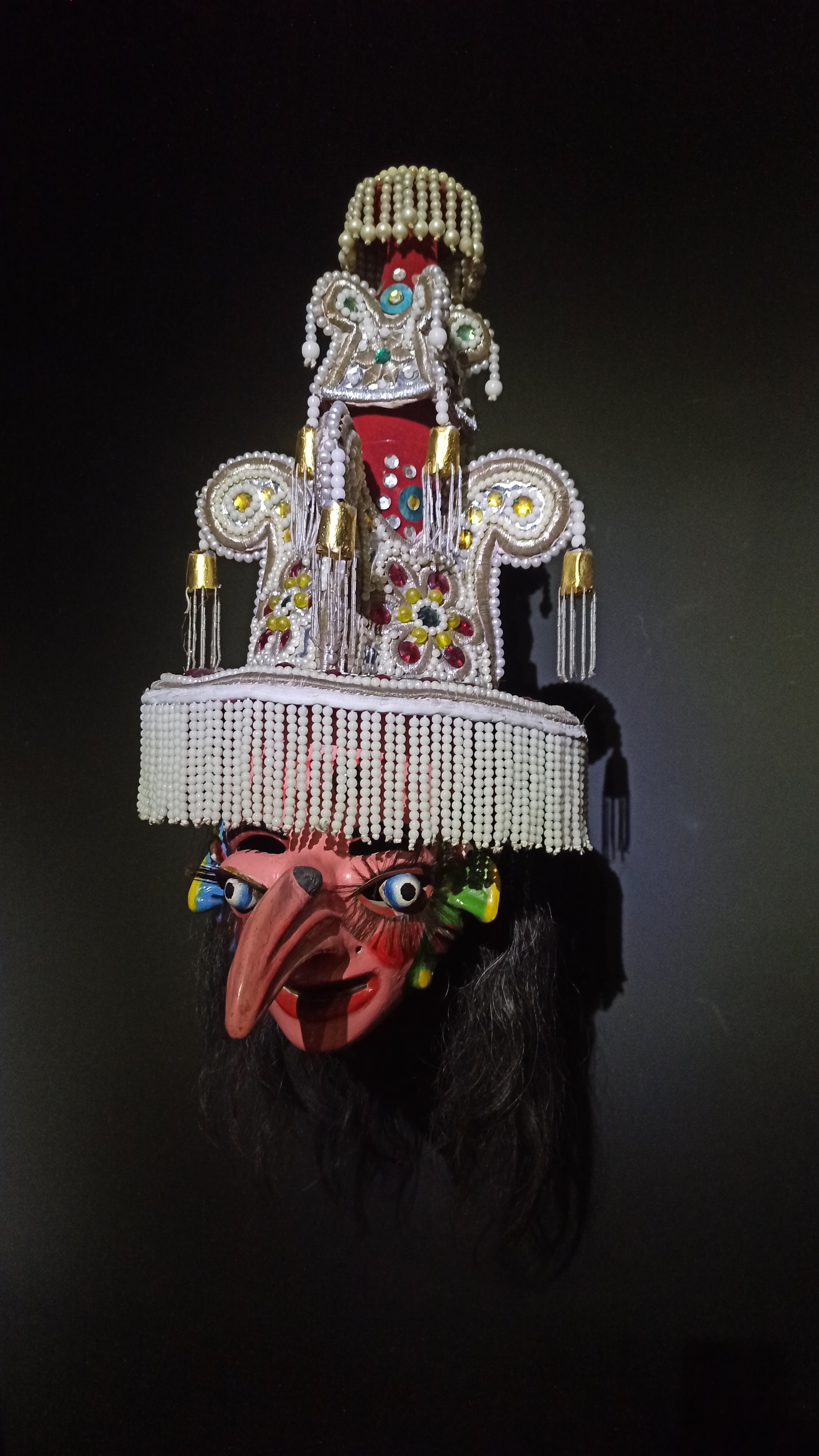
Traditional Waphuri mask

Waphuri is a character in the Bolivian Kullawada dance. Historically, it is a male figure who guided the dancers, but in the 21st century, the figure of the Waphuri Galán emerged, often portrayed by transsexual and transgender people. This transformation, based primarily on drag performance, was promoted by the LGBT arts collective La Familia Galán and has become an integral part of the dance.

== History ==
=== Traditional Waphuri ===
The Kullawada dance traditionally featured spinners and weavers of camelid fibers. Originally, the figure of the Waphuri was that of a hypermasculine leader who led the other spinners with a large and ostentatious spinning wheel known as kapu wara wara. It is derived from the Aymara words "kapu" meaning spinning wheel and "wara wara" meaning stars, in reference to a constellation).

Traditionally, the character wears a plaster mask with three faces and an excessively long nose, with phallic connotation. The costume consists of an embroidered jacket studded with gold and silver stones and threads, a tall hat, a large spinning wheel, trousers, and sandals, which give the character an elegant and upright appearance.

=== Waphuri Galán ===
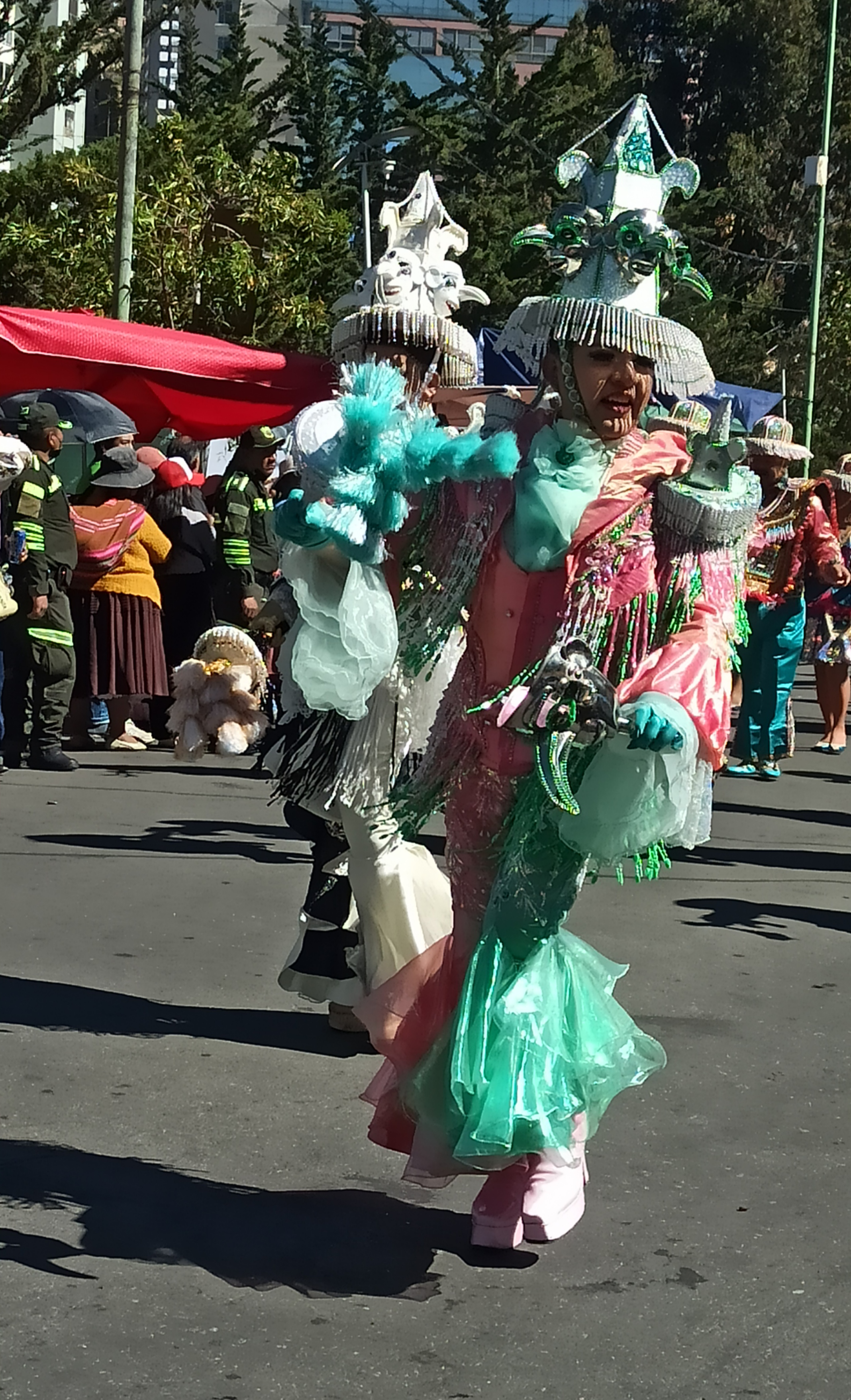
David Aruquipa as Waphuri Galán

In 2001, following a rehearsal by the Chukutas block of the Cullaguada Oruro fraternity, the leader of the block invited Paris Galan to dance as the sole Waphuri. However, Paris passed the invitation to the Galán Family (La Familia Galán), of which he was the leader. This was the beginning of the transformation of the character, which was made more feminine with the addition of high heels, mantilla, corset, ruffles to the costume, and an elaborate make-up.

I transformed the Waphuri character (the guide of the Kullawada block), who used to be very masculine. Now it is associated with queerness, because the costume is a 'dragified' outfit. Traditional Waphuris still exist, but they are not as visible as the Waphuri Galáns, standing at 2.1 meters tall from the hat to the shoes, with 10-centimeter-long eyelashes and a spectacular costume.

— Paris Galan

David Aruquipa, better known as Dana Galán, recalls that the first Waphuri costume was designed with inspiration from the matador outfit worn by Juan Gabriel and the hat which features four faces looking in four different directions being a reference to the four cardinal directions. According to the LGBT activists, the Waphuri Galán figure is a continuation of and a tribute to the transgender identities that had already formed part of Bolivian folklore, such as Barbarella. Initially, the presence of the Galán Family at the Oruro Carnival generated controversy, and the group was accused of distorting the dance. However, over the years their participation has gained increasing acceptance. Since then, members of the Galán Family have been invited every year to perform as Waphuris in various Kullawada fraternities throughout Bolivia. In addition, other LGBT young people have begun performing as Waphuris across the country.
