= París Galán =

Bolivian drag queen and politician (1968–2026)

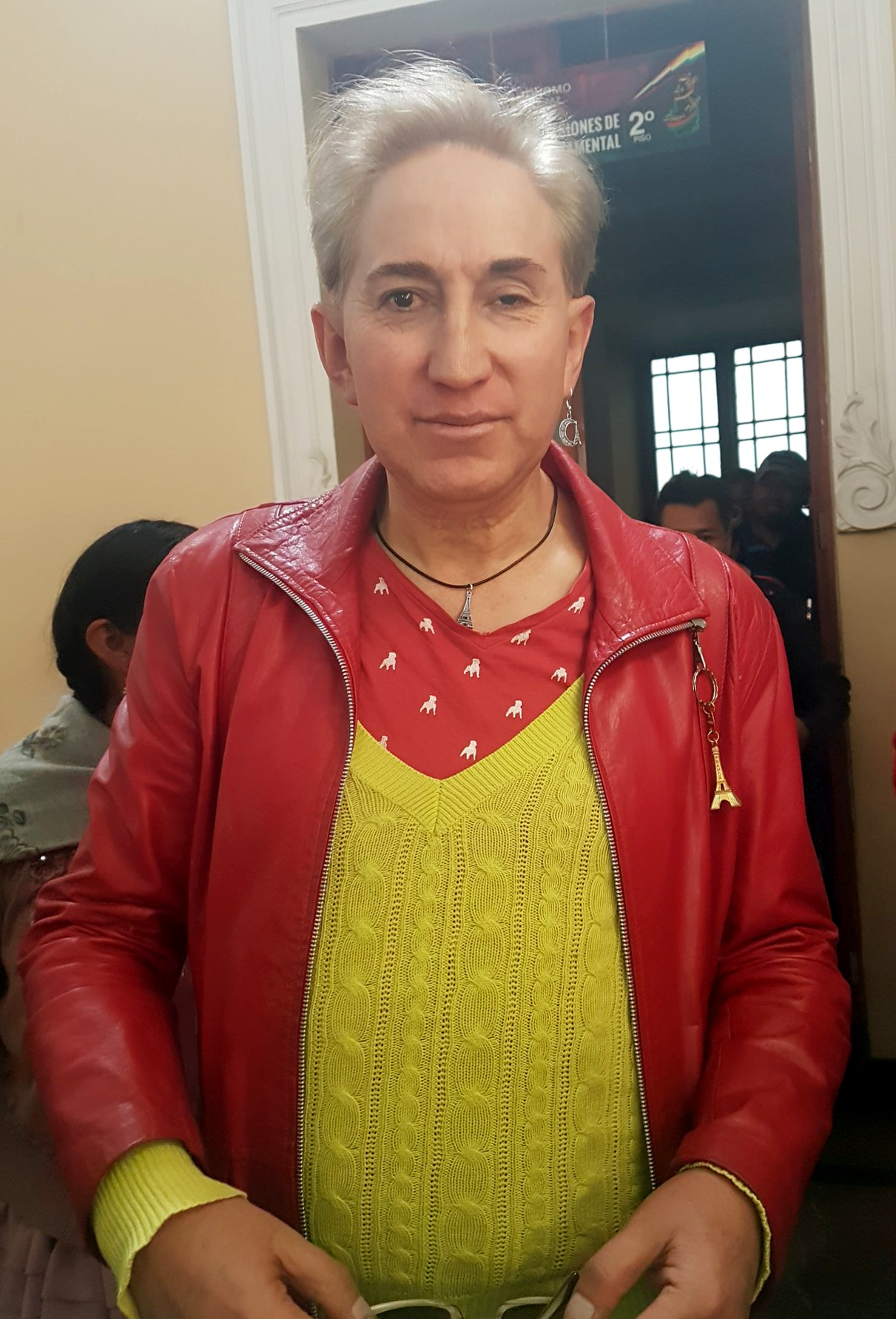
- Parra in 2019

Member of the La Paz Departmental Legislative Assembly
- In office 30 May 2019 – 3 May 2021
- Constituency: Party list

Substitute Member of the La Paz Departmental Legislative Assembly
- In office 31 May 2015 – 30 May 2019
- Assemblyman: Vilma Magne
- Constituency: Party list

Personal details
- Born: Carlos Felipe Parra Heredia; 5 February 1968 Oruro, Bolivia
- Died: 30 May 2026 (aged 58) Cochabamba, Bolivia
- Party: Sovereignty and Liberty (2014–2021)
- Other political affiliations: MAS-IPSP (until 2006); MBL (2006)
- Occupation: Drag queen; politician

Carlos Felipe Parra Heredia (5 February 1968 – 30 May 2026), known professionally as París Galán (Spanish: [paˈɾis ɣaˈlan]), was a Bolivian drag queen, LGBT rights activist and politician. A member of Galan Family (Familia Galán), a collective of LGBT drag performers, Parra was the country's best-known drag queen. He (Note: Parra was indifferent to the pronouns used to refer to him, stating, as one example, that the masculine article el and the feminine la had both been used to address him, as in "el París or la París". Various Spanish-language media outlets, as well as he himself, have referred to him using both masculine and feminine grammatical gender. Parra identified as a man, but was also "fascinated by trans" and wished to transform his appearance at times. This article uses he/him for consistency.) made history as the first-ever openly transgender individual to win elective office in Bolivia after being elected to the La Paz Departmental Legislative Assembly in 2015. To date, he is one of two queer people and the second gay man in Bolivia to have held political office as a lawmaker, after Manuel Canelas.

Born and raised in Oruro, Parra later studied linguistics in Paris. He settled in La Paz, where he became a popular fixture of the underground LGBT nightclub scene. Together with other queer artists, he performed drag shows as part of La Familia Galán, a drag collective based in the city. Although the group saw small-scale success as a troupe of purely feminine gender performers, Parra and other members worked to introduce more exaggerated androgynous and zoomorphic elements of drag queen culture to their art form. The resulting style, labeled transformismo drag queen, saw huge success once the group went public in 2001, becoming a staple of La Familia Galán's performances at pride parades and folkloric events.

Having previously participated in LGBT rights and HIV/AIDS awareness campaigns, Parra became more involved politically at the onset of the 2006–2007 Constituent Assembly. Although his troupe attempted to collaborate with other activist organizations to consolidate a broader LGBT movement, internal disagreements and factionalism hampered the community's efforts at securing rights-affirming legislation. In 2006, he contested a seat in the Constituent Assembly on the Free Bolivia Movement's electoral list but failed to attain the position. Years later, in 2015, he was elected as a substitute member of the La Paz Departmental Legislative Assembly, becoming the country's first-ever transgender legislator. Parra attempted to fill an open primary seat left vacant by his party's failure to nominate a candidate to hold it, but electoral authorities refused to accredit him. After a four-year legal battle, during which he went on multiple hunger strikes, Parra was seated in 2019. He sought reelection in 2021 but failed to secure a second term.

== Early life and performance career ==
Carlos Parra was born on 5 February 1968 in Oruro. His mother, a widowed Quechua indigenous woman, raised him alongside ten siblings. Parra realized he was gay at the age of 4. Recalling the social challenges he faced for his sexual orientation, Parra noted that he never had to come out as a child. "Everyone knew what I was; they called me La Parra. (Note: In Spanish grammatical gender, the definite article la is used to denote femininity.) I was always like that: visible; I was a transgressor, and I associated with transgressive people."

=== Las Galán and transformismo femenino: 1997–2001 ===
In 1986, shortly after graduating high school, Parra's mother sent him to live in La Paz "to get him away from his fag friends". Instead, Parra's stay in the capital led him to develop even closer bonds with the LGBT community, as he formed new relationships with many of the city's travesti residents. He spent a short leave of absence in Paris on a scholarship from the French Embassy, during which time he completed a postgraduate degree in linguistics and learned to speak English and French. Upon his return to La Paz, Parra became more active in the city's gay nightclub scene. In particular, he frequented Sopocachi's Bronx bowling alley, where he was introduced to Diana Sofía Galán (Marco Salguero), a drag performance artist who introduced him to the art of transformismo femenino. (Note: According to ethnomusicologist Matthew Leslie Santana, the usage of transformismo most closely mirrors that of "gender performance" in the United States. Although Santana loosely uses terms such as drag queen to describe an artist performing femininity (transformista femenina), researcher and LGBT rights activist David Aruquipa argues that there is a distinction between transformismo femenino and transformismo drag queen, with the latter including more androgynous identities.)

Together with other artists, Parra and Salguero began performing drag shows as a group, with the troupe coming to be known as Las Galán by La Paz's queer community. The collective formally constituted itself under that name in 1997, with each member taking the stage surname Galán as an homage towards Salguero, their drag mother. For his stage name, Parra chose París after the city where he was educated. For the duration of the late 1990s, Parra's collective continued to see small success performing at gay bars and discothèques. Although the troupe as a whole remained relatively underground—"hidden by the dim and gloomy lights of nightclubs, and seen only by people [we] knew", as recounted by Danna Galán (David Aruquipa)—Parra was "much more daring and willing to pursue" public ventures. In 1998, he was a finalist on Miss La Paz and placed third at the national pageant. He came out publicly as gay on the program Atrévete hosted by Ximena Galarza.

=== La Familia Galán and transformismo drag queen: 2001–2005 ===
Although Las Galán was originally conceived of as a gay movement, the adhesion of new members of different gender identities led Parra to envisage a more inclusive style of transformismo. In conversations with Aruquipa, the pair worked to adapt transformismo to include more exaggerated elements of drag queen culture. The resulting style, labeled transformismo drag queen, had "a more irreverent aesthetic". Through the usage of colorful wigs, strident costumes, as well as the incorporation of androgynous and zoomorphic elements, performers could take their appearance "to its extreme," giving transformismo drag queen a more "playful and transgressive connotation". Although Salguero was unfond of the "drag queen" label, Parra collaborated with Aruquipa to introduce the term to the wider community.

The experiment was a resounding success, with transformismo drag queen becoming "synonymous with [Las Galán] in street marches and interventions", especially after the collective made its public debut in 2001. That year, in December, Las Galán were invited as an explicitly drag queen group to perform at the Plaza Abaroa during a pride event commemorating the fifty-third anniversary of the Universal Declaration of Human Rights. From then, Parra and his troupe became a staple at popular events in La Paz, promoting the art of cross-dressing in different artistic forms and mediums, including at exhibitions, nightclub performances, pageants, pride parades, and even through television and magazine promotions.

In his analysis, Aruquipa states that the early 2000s marked the period in which Las Galán moved away from being a collective of purely feminine drag performers and began adopting more varied forms of gender expression. For Parra, the group had ceased to be a gay movement and had become a trans movement "in all its forms. From the simplest, which is transformismo, [to] transgression, to transformation, because we have transformed our lives." With the group's rapid expansion in both membership and scope came the move to rearticulate its core identity. Starting from 2003, the troupe began dubbing itself La Familia Galán, adopting a position of found family and questioning the exclusive belonging to biological family. The name was also an overt challenge to the concept of nuclear family promoted by pro-life and religious fundamentalist groups, with whom the collective had had multiple public confrontations.

== Political career and LGBT activism ==
=== Political activism and LGBT organizing: 2001–2005 ===
Parra's first forays into political activism occurred in 2001 when his troupe participated in an HIV/AIDS awareness event in La Paz and was later contracted for a nationwide awareness campaign. Around this time, La Familia Galán began actively participating in early attempts at consolidating an LGBT movement in Bolivia. In 2002, it was one of over twenty groups that attended the III LGBT National Congress in La Paz. At the meeting, Parra and Las Galán criticized the way the event's organizers had been operating. Parra's stance stemmed from his skeptical view towards non-governmental organizations, which he saw as corrupt, elitist, and unable to function as advocacy groups. La Familia Galán backed the formation of the National Network of LGBT Communities of Bolivia, but the body gradually dissolved as member groups, including Las Galán, began dissociating themselves from it.

In 2005, the Rainbow Movement was formed, composed of La Familia Galán and other LGBT organizations opposed to the national network. The group sought to apply more overtly political overtones to the various pride events that had been held until then, promoting the idea that rather than simple aesthetic displays, LGBT marches could be used as platforms to demand civil rights. "This is not just a parade; this is a march to end homophobia", Parra stated at one demonstration. In June, the Rainbow Movement constituted La Paz's delegation to the IV LGBT National Congress, where it voiced its criticisms of the national network's failings. The group voted against the network's annual report and against its continuation as a body but was outvoted by delegations from the six other participating departments. Its members abandoned the congress the next day, disregarding any ensuing resolutions it made.

=== LGBT rights and the Constituent Assembly: 2005–2006 ===
Parra and La Familia Galán's split with other organized LGBT movements came at a critical time when broader discussions regarding potential reforms to the Constitution were in full swing. At times, the movement's internal factionalism and disunity hampered efforts to include the expansion of LGBT rights in these discussions. An example of this occurred in 2002 when the National Network of LGBT Communities presented Congress with a package of constitutional amendments that included, among other things, the right to same-sex marriage and civil unions. Aside from the expected pushback levied by the Catholic Church, the network's proposals also faced internal opposition from LGBT groups, such as Mujeres Creando and La Familia Galán, despite the fact that both had participated in drafting it. When the document was set to be debated in the Chamber of Deputies, a communication error resulted in proponents of the legislation not arriving, meaning that only Parra and another critic, María Galindo, attended. According to Alberto Moscoso, director of the national network, "at [the meeting], París said: 'I don't want to get married, and I don't know why they are asking for marriage in the law,' [but] the law was for everyone, it was not specifically for París Galán." Ultimately, such internal disagreements and contradicting viewpoints caused the project to lose momentum, and the legislation was archived by Congress.

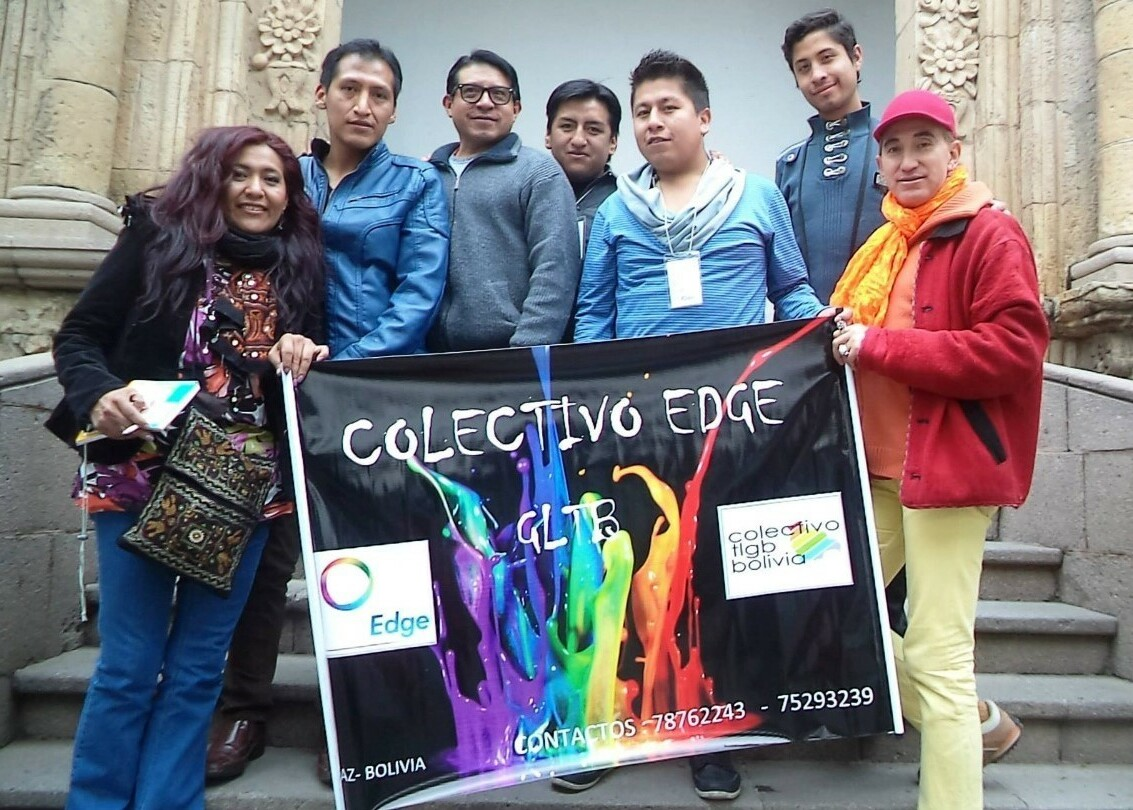
Parra (furthest right) with other LGBT organizers in La Paz, 27 June 2022.

Despite these setbacks, new opportunities to advance LGBT causes arose. In the leadup to 2006, with the convocation of the Constituent Assembly, the prospect of codifying LGBT rights into the newly rewritten constitution became a top priority for groups like Parra's. In the month's preceding the assembly's installation, Parra and La Familia Galán collaborated with government authorities to present their sector's proposals. In April 2005, the government's Constituent Assembly Coordination Unit, in collaboration with La Familia Galán and other LGBT organizations, convened the National Workshop on Gender and Sexual Diversities in Cochabamba. At a discursive level, the event marked a turning point for the Bolivian LGBT rights movement, as La Familia Galán managed to successfully center the discussion of queer rights around "gender and sexual diversity" rather than just the "gay community", a term that began falling out of use. "Until that moment, there had been talk of the gay, the gay, and the gay, making the trans, the lesbian, [and] the bisexual invisible", Parra later stated.

In addition to this and other policy proposals compiled at the meeting, a national commission was also formed to represent the country's sexual minorities before the Constituent Assembly Coordination Unit. Parra was elected as the commission's national representative, but internal power struggles led rival organizers to dispute his selection, generating a crisis of representation. Just a few months later, during the IV LGBT National Congress, the effectively defunct commission formed in April was dissolved, and a new Gender and Sexual Diversity Committee backed by the UCAC and other LGBT and human rights organizations was established. Having already abandoned the congress, La Familia Galán did not participate in its creation, and the committee ultimately met the same fate as its predecessor. Seeing the need to consolidate a broader coalition, Parra participated in the formation of the Strategic Alliance for the Inclusion of Diversities, a body that brought together activist organizations from a variety of minority groups. Following the formation of its directorate, Parra was elected as the alliance's national representative.

Although it was initially hoped that civil society organizations would be allowed to field their own candidates for the Constituent Assembly, the reaffirmation of political parties as the only groups authorized to compete electorally forced Parra and other organizers to seek out a front willing to sponsor them. Given his status as an activist for the party, Parra first looked to seal a deal with the ruling Movement for Socialism (MAS-IPSP). His alliance soon reached an agreement with the MAS in which the party pledged to include representatives from each sector—including three sexual minorities—on its electoral list. However, the party reneged on the agreement at the eleventh hour, forcing Parra to find a new front within hours of the registration deadline. "The MAS turned its back on us", Parra decried. His and other queer organizers' candidacies were eventually sponsored by the Free Bolivia Movement, but the hectic last-minute change weakened their electoral positions. "I was placed in a constituency where no one knew me", Parra recounted. In the end, not one LGBT candidate was elected to the Constituent Assembly. With the dissolution of the strategic alliance shortly thereafter, Parra stepped back from the political scene and did not play an active role in the constitution drafting process. While the final text included some LGBT-affirming language, it stopped short of codifying more important queer issues, and explicitly barred same-sex marriage.

=== Electoral politics and procedural hurdles: 2015–2021 ===
In the years succeeding the passage of the 2009 Constitution, Parra assumed an antagonistic disposition towards the ruling MAS government, whose anti-discrimination efforts he considered lacking. In a 2016 interview with The Washington Post, Parra expressed disapproval of the way in which the government had handled a law allowing transgender citizens to legally change their gender. He concluded that it had only gone forward with the bill "to quell anger from activists" and lamented that LGBT rights groups had been asked to "keep a low profile ... while the bill was in congress ... to avoid generating opposition". When asked in 2019 whether the law had changed the situation for trans people in Bolivia, Parra responded with a flat "no", pointing out that the government had actually gone back and amended the legislation after a trans woman had used it to marry her partner.

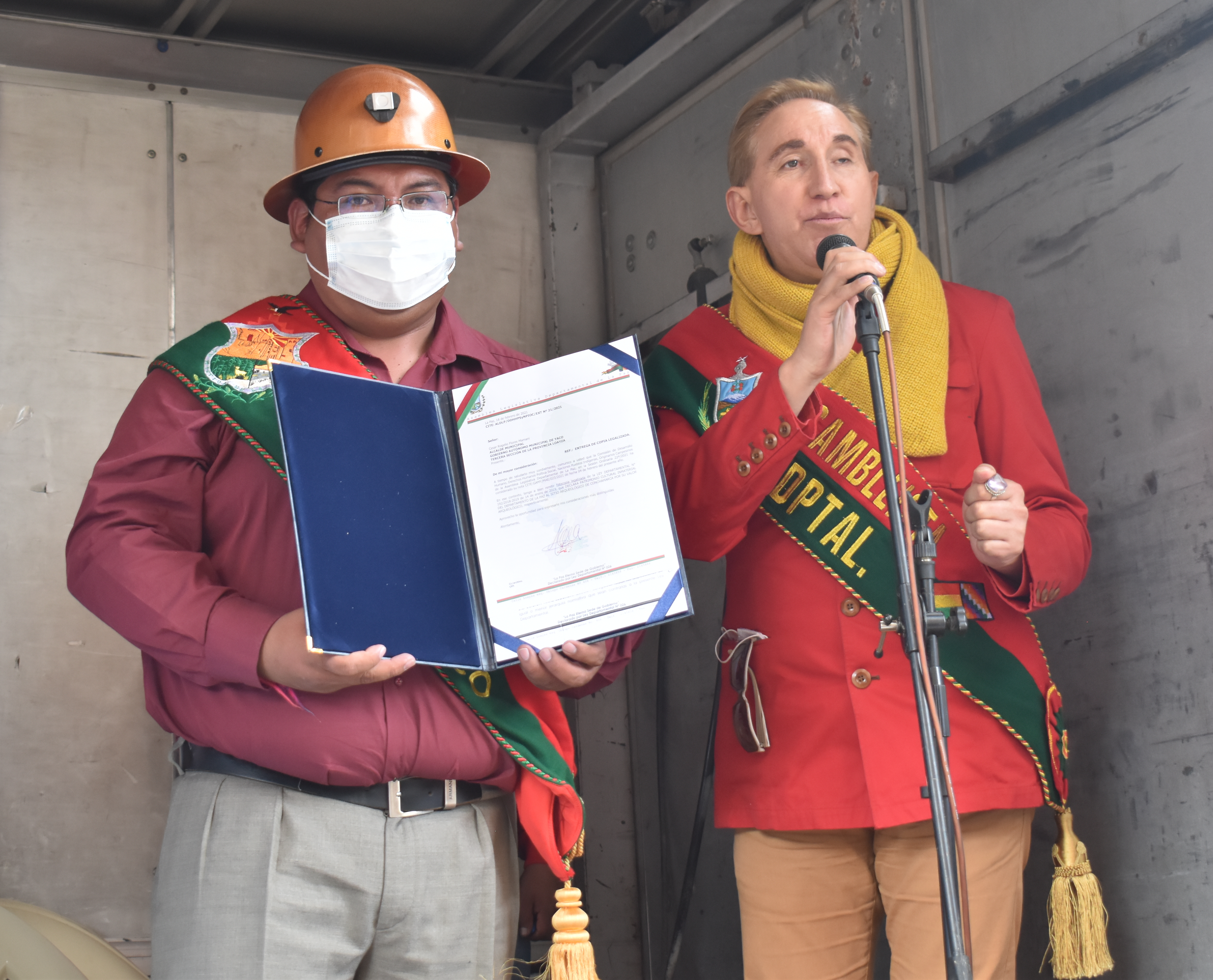
Delivering a speech at a commemorative ceremony in La Paz, 18 February 2021.

Starting from the early 2010s, Parra began supporting the progressive policies of La Paz Mayor Luis Revilla, who had come out much more openly in favor of LGBT rights compared to the national government. In late 2014, responding to the public call issued by Revilla's party, Sovereignty and Liberty (SOL.bo), Parra presented himself as a pre-candidate for a seat on the La Paz Municipal Council. The party eventually nominated him for a seat in the La Paz Departmental Legislative Assembly, in which he was to serve as a substitute assemblyman. Elected in early 2015 and sworn in in May, Parra became the first-ever openly transgender individual to win elective office in Bolivian history. As of 2026, he is one of two queer people and the second gay man to have served as a lawmaker in the country, after Manuel Canelas, who assumed a seat in the Chamber of Deputies just months prior.

In accordance with proportional representation, SOL.bo was assigned ten party list seats in the Departmental Legislative Assembly. Given that the party had only nominated seven candidates, the remaining three seats were left vacant upon the assembly's inauguration. As one of the three highest-ranking substitute assembly members, Parra sought to be authorized to hold one of the empty seats. Although the Supreme Electoral Tribunal ordered the three substitutes to be sworn in, the Departmental Electoral Tribunal refused to accredit them on technical grounds, kicking off a years-long legal battle. After three years of gridlock—during which time one of the three substitutes, José Luis Mayta, died in an accident—Parra and his colleague, Delia Quispe, declared a hunger strike in protest of the violation of their political rights. In September 2018, the Supreme Electoral Tribunal intervened and delivered Parra and Quispe their credentials. Despite this, the pair continued to face hurdles as the MAS-controlled legislature, faced with the loss of its de facto majority, refused to swear them in. Finally, on 30 May 2019, after four years and with just ten months left in their terms, both Parra and Quispe were allowed to assume office.

As a result of the annulment of the 2019 general election and delays in holding the 2020 general election, the terms of all subnational authorities, including Parra's, were extended by one year. In the 2021 departmental elections, Parra sought reelection to his seat in the Departmental Assembly. However, SOL.bo's distant sixth-place finish at the polls left it devoid of most parliamentary representation, denying Parra a second term.

== Personal life and death ==
Parra was gay and had been in at least four committed same-sex relationships throughout his life. Regarding the prospect of marriage, Parra expressed a lack of interest in the matter, stating that he had "always been against the idea ... I think that when you meet someone and want to express your love, you can do it without the need for a legal union." He also stated that he would not adopt, saying: "those who think, 'I'm gay; I want to have a partner and adopt children to validate myself' are reinforcing [the] nuclear family ... and I question that." Regarding his gender identity, Parra stated that he thought that he wanted to be a woman as a teenager, but that as he "grew emotionally, matured, and had [his] first partner" he re-affirmed his position as a man, saying that he did not want to be a woman and enjoyed his body and sexuality. At the same time, Parra identified as transgender, viewing himself outside the gender binary. "You have to define yourself for people because they want something fixed, so I define myself as trans", he commented.

Parra died in Cochabamba on 30 May 2026, at the age of 58.

== Electoral history ==
Electoral history of París Galán
Year	Office	Alliance	Votes			Result	Ref.
Year	Office	Alliance	Total	%	P.	Result	Ref.
2006	Constituent	Free Bolivia Movement	3,226	4.25%	5th	Lost	
2015	Substitute assemblyman	Sovereignty and Liberty	436,762	45.87%	1st	Won	(Note: Presented on an electoral list. The data shown represents the share of the vote the entire party/alliance received in that constituency.)
2021	Assemblyman	Sovereignty and Liberty	27,650	2.60%	6th	Lost	
Source: Plurinational Electoral Organ | Electoral Atlas
