= Nyke Slawik =

German politician (born 1994)

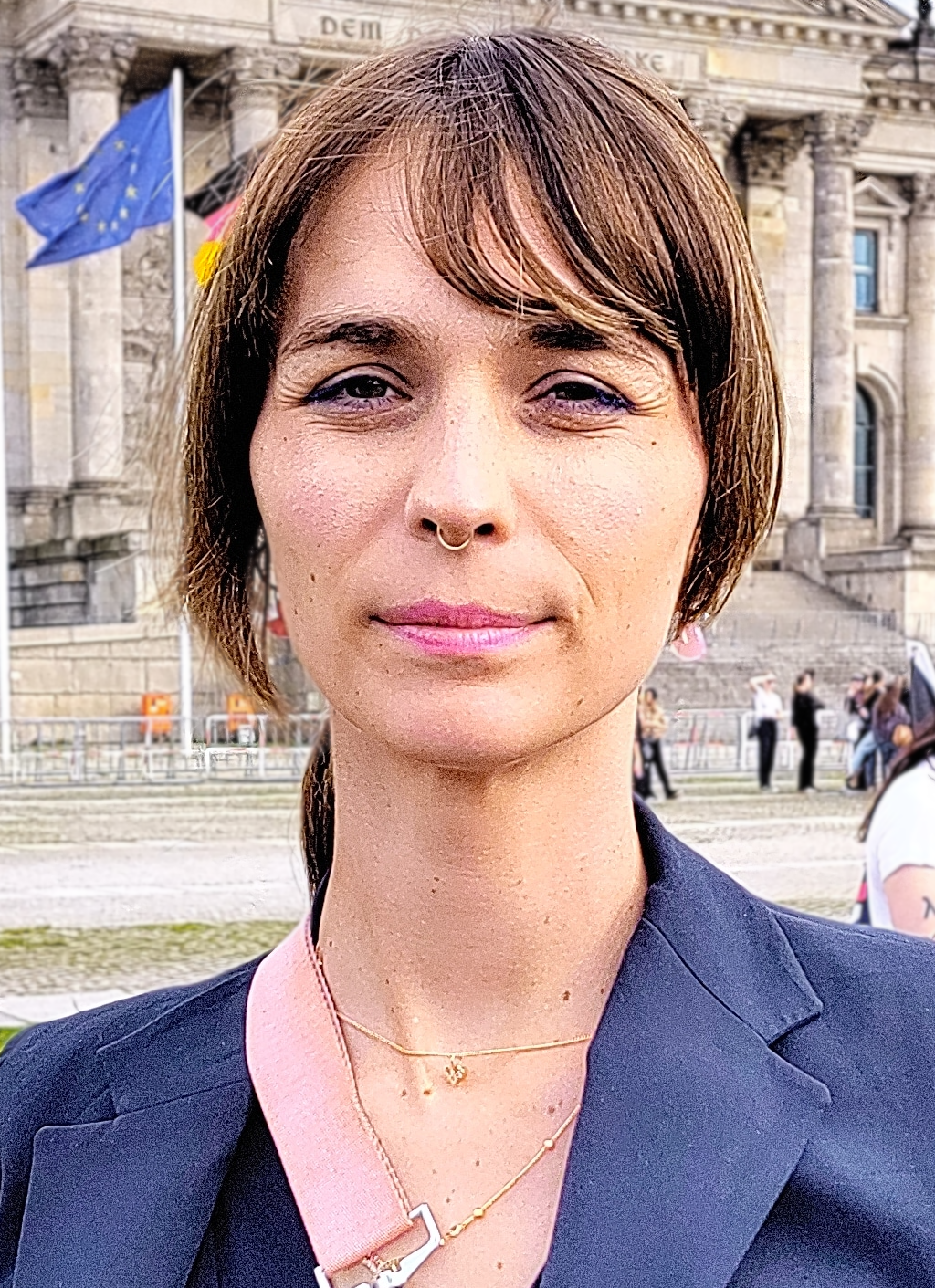
- Slawik in 2025

Member of the Bundestag
- Incumbent
- Assumed office 26 October 2021
- Constituency: North Rhine-Westphalia

Personal details
- Born: 7 January 1994 (age 32) Leverkusen, Cologne; North Rhine-Westphalia, Germany
- Party: Alliance 90/The Greens
- Education: Heinrich Heine University Düsseldorf
- Website: nyke-slawik.de

Nyke Slawik (born 7 January 1994) is a German politician and member of the Bundestag representing the German state of North Rhine-Westphalia on the Alliance 90/The Greens list. Upon her election in the 2021 German federal election, Slawik and fellow politician Tessa Ganserer together became the first openly transgender people elected to the German parliament.

== Early life and education ==
Slawik was born and raised in Leverkusen-Opladen, where her mother's family had lived for several generations. Her father immigrated to Leverkusen from the Polish region of Silesia in the late 1970s. After graduating from high school in 2012, she enrolled at Heinrich Heine University in the German city of Düsseldorf, where she studied English and American studies alongside Media and Communication studies. During her time at the university, she studied abroad in the city of Leicester, England and interned at the European Parliament in Brussels.

== Political career ==
=== Early beginnings ===
In 2009, Slawik joined the Green Youth, the Green party's youth association, before serving as a board member of the Young Greens of Düsseldorf from 2013 to 2015. From 2015 to 2017, she was a member of the board of the Green Youth in her home state of North Rhine-Westphalia.

In 2017, she ran as a Green candidate for the Landtag of North Rhine-Westphalia. Two years later, during the 2019 European election in Germany, she ran as a Green party candidate for the European Parliament.

From 2018 to 2021, Slawik worked as research assistant in the State Parliament of North Rhine-Westphalia for the MPs Wibke Brems and Matthi Bolte.

=== Member of the Bundestag, 2021–present ===
Slawik was elected to the Bundestag in the 2021 German federal election on the Green list of North Rhine-Westphalia. Along with fellow Green Tessa Ganserer, Slawik became the first openly transgender person elected to the German parliament.

In the negotiations to form a coalition government of the Christian Democratic Union (CDU) and the Green Party under Minister-President of North Rhine-Westphalia Hendrik Wüst following the 2022 state elections, Slawik was part of her party’s delegation in the working group on transport.

== Other activities ==
- Federal Network Agency for Electricity, Gas, Telecommunications, Posts and Railway (BNetzA), Alternate Member of the Rail Infrastructure Advisory Council (since 2022)

== Political positions ==
=== Climate ===
Slawik supports immediate action to be taken by Germany against the climate crisis, including totally phasing coal out by 2030 and transitioning to 100% renewable energies. She is also in favour of putting a halt to constructions of new roadways and extensions and instead investing that money into green transportation.

=== Social services ===
Slawik favours raising the minimum wage to 12 euros per hour and increasing the Hartz IV unemployment benefits by 50 euros, as well as abolishing the sanctions placed on program recipients who do not meet certain conditions. She has also indicated that she supports potentially replacing the benefits with a more robust system.

=== Social justice ===
To advance the rights of marginalized groups in Germany, Slawik supports establishing an all-encompassing federal anti-discrimination law, requiring women to make up at least 50% of German parliaments and executive business boards. She supports an identity self-determination law for transgender Germans, and ending the pay gap between women and men. Slawik also supports a nationwide plan to combat racism, sexism, transphobia and homophobia.

=== Youth participation ===
Slawik supports a possible decrease in the voting age to 16 to facilitate increased youth involvement in government.
