= Ines Eichmüller =

German politician (born 1980)

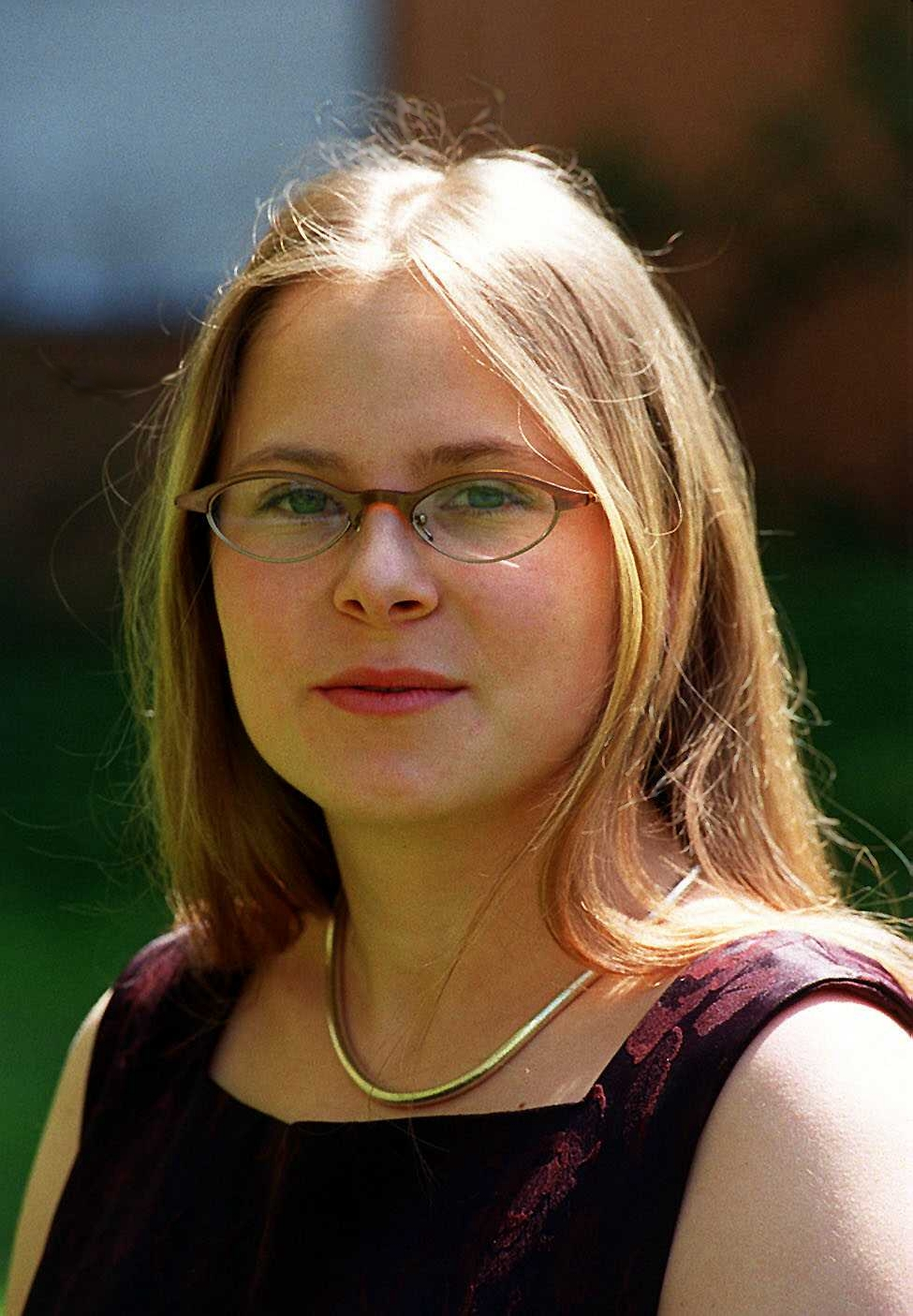
- Eichmüller in 2005

Green Youth National Spokesperson
- In office 2003–2005

Personal details
- Born: 1 May 1980 (age 46) Nürnberger Land; Bavaria, Germany
- Party: Alliance 90/The Greens
- Spouse: Tessa Ganserer
- Children: 2
- Education: University of Erlangen–Nuremberg

Ines Eichmüller (born 1 May 1980) is a German politician and political activist. She is a founding member of the Bavarian chapter of the Green Youth, the official youth organization of the Alliance 90/The Greens political party, and served as the Green Youth's national spokesperson from 2003 to 2005. Eichmüller served on the Presidium of the Federal Women's Council of Alliance 90/The Greens from 2004 to 2010 and, in 2009, she was the spokeswoman for the Gostenhof branch of the party. She is married to Tessa Ganserer, the first openly transgender person to serve in a German parliament.

== Early life and education ==
Eichmüller was born on 1 May 1980 in Nürnberger Land, Bavaria. In 1996 she was awarded the environmental prize from the city of Nuremberg for her project installing a photovoltaic system on the roof of her school's building. She graduated from high school in Nuremberg in 2000. Eichmüller went on to study political science and sociology at the University of Erlangen–Nuremberg, where she was awarded the "Young Women in Public Affairs Award" by the Zonta club for Nuremberg Women and was a member of the university's student government.

== Political career ==
Eichmüller is an active member of the European Young Decision Makers Initiative of the Inter-European Forum on Population and Development on Sexual and Reproductive Rights and Health. She worked on the staff of Claudia Stamm during her tenure as the Gender Equality Spokeswoman for the Alliance 90/The Greens in the Landtag of Bavaria. She was a founding member of the Green Youth Bavaria, the official youth organization of the Alliance 90/The Greens, and served as the spokesperson for the Bavarian regional association at the state level of the organization from 1998 to 2000. Eichmüller coordinated the association's specialist forum for equality and, from March 2003 to May 2005, she served as the national spokesperson for the Green Youth. She previously served as the district chairwoman of the Alliance 90/The Greens in Nuremberg from 2000 to 2002. In 2003 she was a candidate in the Nuremberg city council elections. In 2004 she was appointed as a member of the Presidium of the Federal Women's Council of Alliance 90/The Greens, serving in that capacity until 2010. In 2009 she was the spokeswoman for the Gostenhof branch of the Alliance 90/The Greens.

Her political work has been focused on gender equality, LGBTQ rights, environmental policy, human rights, and non-violent and peaceful diplomatic negotiations. Since 2013 she has been active in fundraising for causes working to end violence against women and girls.

== Personal life ==
Eichmüller is married to the politician Tessa Ganserer and they have two sons.
