= Alejandra González Pino =

Chilean politician (1968–2022)

Member of the Municipal Council of Lampa
- In office 6 December 2004 – 6 December 2016

Personal details
- Born: 10 March 1968 Batuco, Santiago, Chile
- Died: 5 October 2022 (aged 54) Batuco, Santiago, Chile
- Party: PH; Independent
- Occupation: Politician

Alejandra González Pino (10 March 1968 – 5 October 2022) was a Chilean politician. She was the first transgender person to be elected to a political office in Chile and one of the first in Latin America after Kátia Tapety in Brazil in 1992.

== Biography ==
From a young age, González had felt as though she identified as a woman. In 1995, she joined a circus of drag queens in her neighborhood and owned her own hair salon. She gave hairdressing classes to those infected with HIV/AIDS at San José Hospital in Santiago. In 2002, she met with TECHO, for whom she served as a municipal and provincial representative.

=== Political career ===
In 2004, González was elected to the municipal council of Lampa as an independent within the Juntos Podemos Más coalition. She received 6.8% of the vote and became the first transgender person to serve in a political office in Chile. She was re-elected in 2008 with 6.3% of the vote within the Concertación list and was re-elected again in 2012 with 9.5% of the vote. She lost her mandate in 2016, having only received 2.5% of the vote.

In 2012, González became Chile's first transgender deputy mayor when Graciela Ortúzar left her office to campaign elsewhere. In 2014, she invoked the anti-discrimination law against Ortúzar, who was sentenced by the Supreme Court of Chile in 2017 to pay a fine, a ruling described as historic by González and LGBT rights groups.

Alejandra González Pino died of heart failure in Batuco on 5 October 2022, at the age of 54.
