= Galán Family =

Bolivian LGBTQ artist and activist collective

- Familia Galán
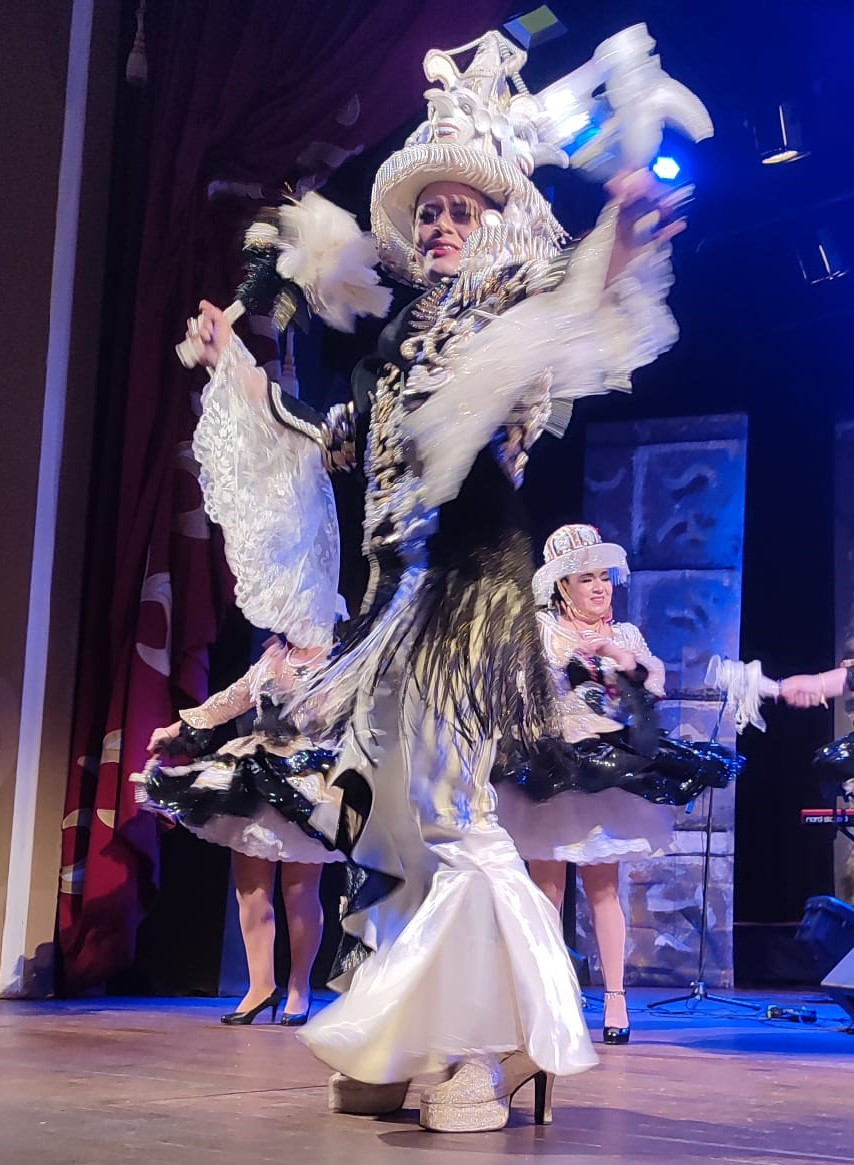
- Whapuris Galán, a prominent character of the Galán Family
- Established: 1997
- Type: Artist and activist collective
- Location: Bolivia
- Key people: Diana Sofía Galán, París Galán

The Galán Family is a Bolivian collective of LGBT artists and activists known for its involvement in artistic demonstrations and drag performances in different public spaces.

== History ==
The Galán Family started in the 1990s in La Paz, Bolivia. It emerged out of the drag ball hosting gay bars of Pérez Velasco Avenue. Since 1996, members of the Galán Family have been awarded with various Miss Drag La Paz and Miss Drag Bolivia titles from different competitions. At its start, their drag was characterized by a more Barbie style, but over time it became more in line with the traditional drag queen style. On December 2nd, 2001, the Galán Family made its first public appearance. The creators of the Galán Family said that they picked the title "family" for their group as a reaction to pro-life and family values conservatives, but also because they felt as though they were a political family.

Once the Galán Family had found their signature style of very high heels, wigs, and colorful clothing, the collective began to gain political relevance. With their relevance, they began working as activists both institutionally and socially. As a collective they put on various collective exhibitions and other theatrical works. Additionally, they created the figure of "Waphuri Galán," an interpretation of the traditional Waphuri dance. She is the head spinner and incorporates the aesthetics of both male and female Kullawada dancers. This character has also been incorporated into different dance groups at the main folklore festival of La Paz, the Fiesta del Gran Poder, as well as the intangible cultural heritage festival, Carnaval de Oruro. This inclusion was due to perseverance and negotiations with the organizers of the festivals. In the case of the Carnaval de Oruro, member David Aruquipa, also known by the name Danna Galán, said:

"Year after year, they threatened that they wouldn't let us dance, and year after year our transgression grew greater. This began to include other modern elements like sequined embroidery, fitted jackets, platform boots, many colors and ornaments, while also recovering essential elements of the dance and culture like silver fish, jewels, lace, and shawls which makes this character one of the most anticipated of the dance, distinguishing herself from the tradition."

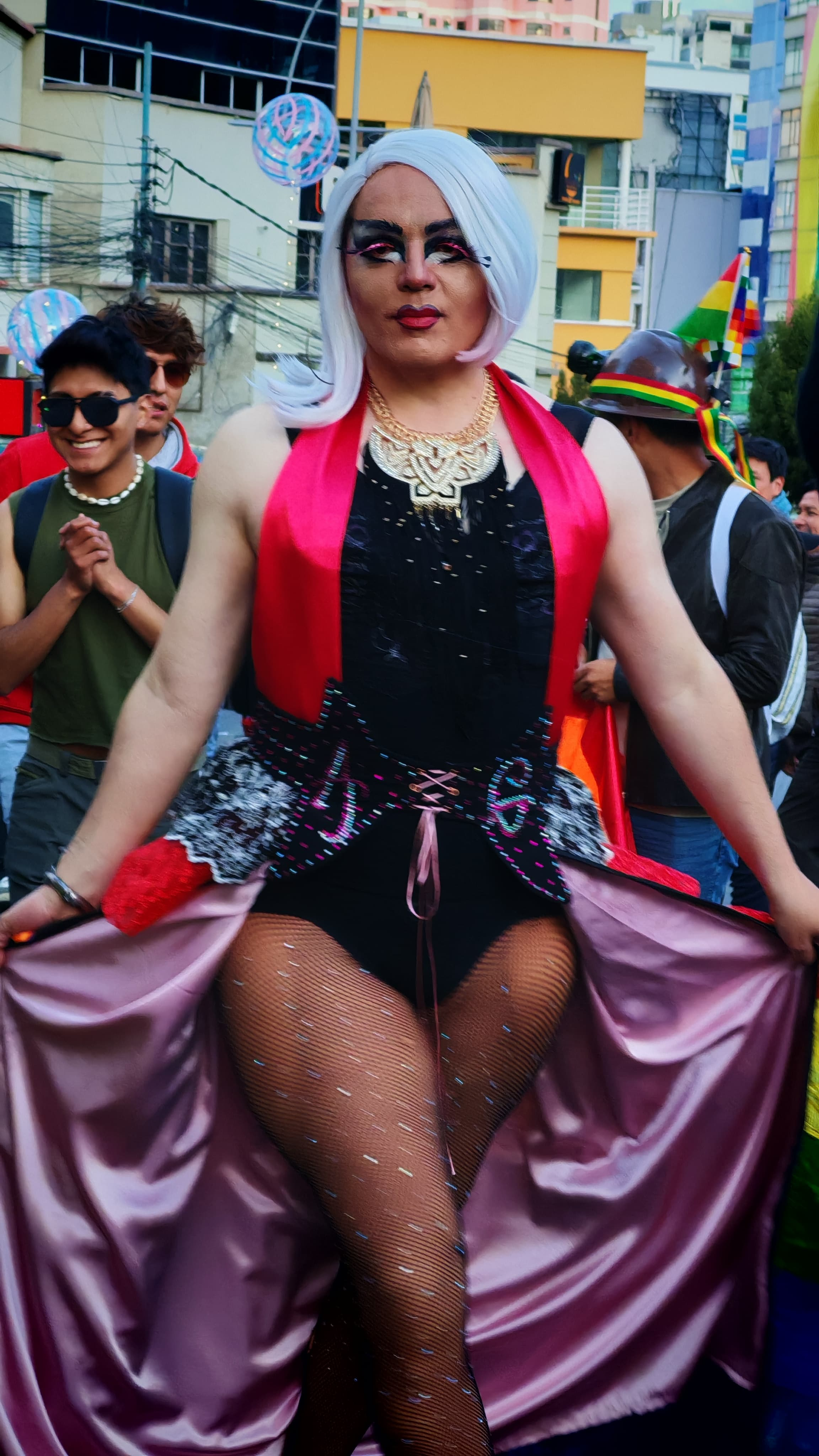
Alicia Galán at 2025 La Paz Pride

The Galán Family is considered a pioneer and driver of the LGBT movement in Bolivia, especially regarding travestis and transsexual people. Likewise, thanks to their social push, they have opened more spaces in media to LGBT people. Such is the case of Andrés Mallo - Alicia Galán, who is part of the group and a television presenter. Additional examples of members of the Galán Family who are publicly visible in Bolivia include Carlos Parra - París Galán, who participated in politics as an alternate assembly person, and David Aruquipa - Danna Galán, a researcher and activist who at the start of 2020 assumed the position of National Head of Cultural Management at the Cultural Foundation of the Central Bank of Bolivia.
