= Salma Luévano =

Mexican politician and human rights activist

Salma Luévano Luna (Spanish pronunciation: [ˈsalma ˈlweβano ˈluna]; born 15 March 1968 in Aguascalientes) is a Mexican politician and LGBT+ rights activist. In the 2021 mid-terms she was elected to the Chamber of Deputies as a plurinominal deputy. She served during the 65th session of Congress (2021–2024) as a member of the Morena caucus.

== Career ==
In the 1990s, Luévano was arrested by Mexican police on charges of indecency for wearing women's clothing. Following her arrest, she became increasingly heavily involved in activist for LGBT+ rights in Mexico and was eventually named director of the Together for the Way of Diversity collective.

She ran for Morena in the 2021 legislative election and secured a second region plurinominal seat. She was one of the first two transgender women to be elected to Congress, along with María Clemente García, also a member of Morena and also elected in 2021.
