= Ximena Galarza =

Bolivian journalist (born 1972)

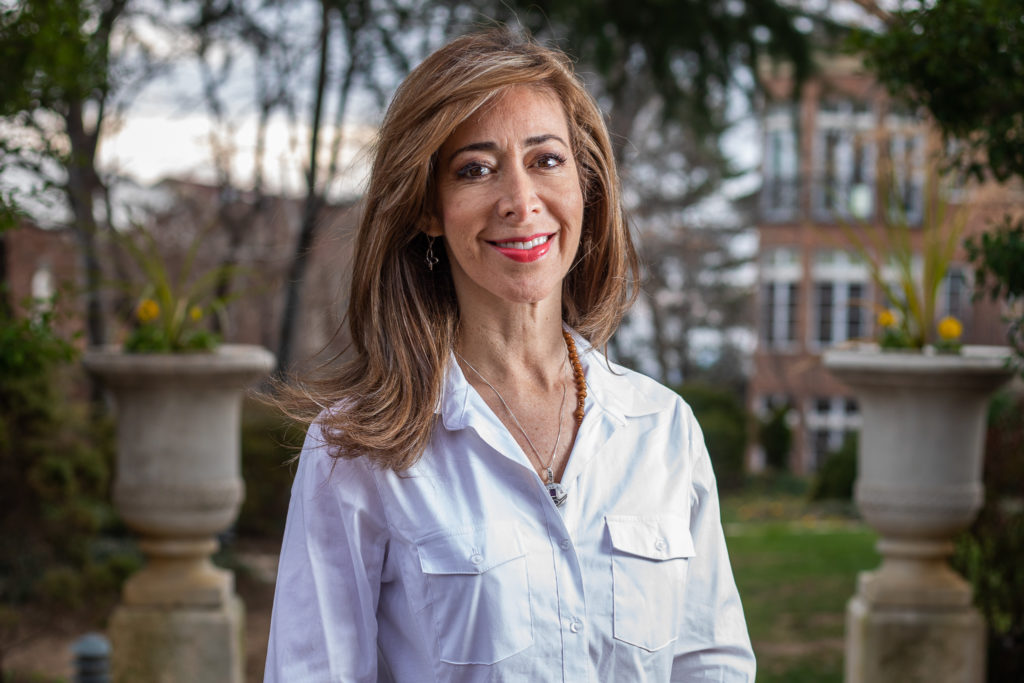
- Born: January 14, 1972 (age 54); Camiri,Santa Cruz-Bolivia
- Occupation: Journalist
- Employer: TVU
- Known for: exposing electoral fraud

Ximena Galarza Lora (born January 14, 1972) is a Bolivian journalist. Her program was able to uncover election fraud in the 2019 Presidential and General elections. She was chosen as an International Woman of Courage in March 2020 by the then U.S. Secretary of State, Mike Pompeo.

== Life ==
Galarza was born in Camiri in 1972. After she graduated in 1989 she had intended to have a career in geological engineering.

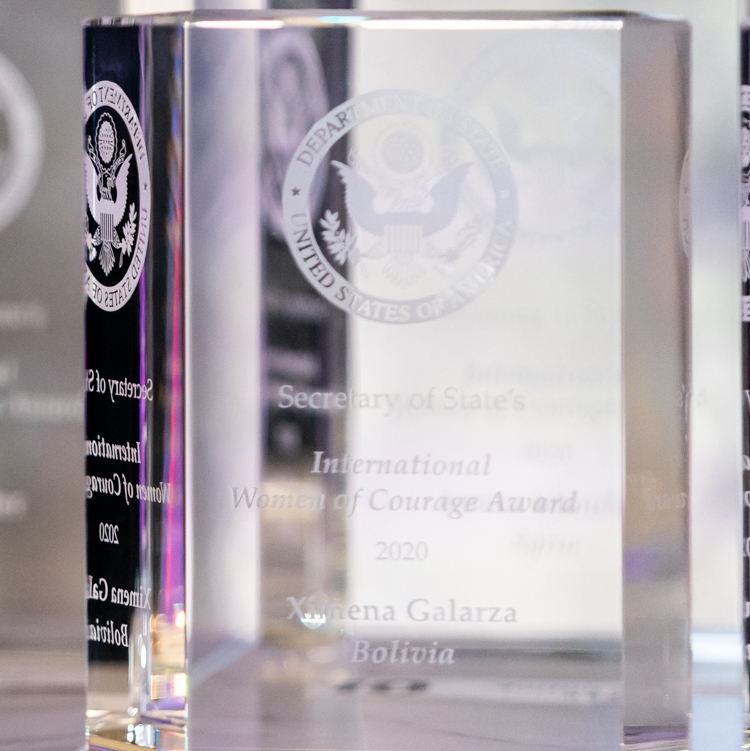
Ximena Galarza's International Women of Courage Award

She went in to journalism and she worked for Red UNO and Cadena A. She left broadcasting for a while and then she returned in 2014 for TVU on their TV programme "Jaque Mate" (Check mate).

"Jaque Mate" (Check Mate) was a leading Brazilian programme for TVU.

Her programme, "Jaque Mate", was able to uncover election fraud in the October 2019 Presidential elections.

By November Bolivia was in political crisis and the President was forced to resign and accept exile in Mexico. Jeanine Áñez took over as interim President.

Galarza was chosen as an International Women of Courage in March 2020 by the US Secretary of State.

== Acting ==
Galarza appeared as a scientist in a rare Bolivian science-fiction film called "The Lake Triangle". The film was premiered in 1999.
