= Matthi Bolte =

German politician (born 1985)

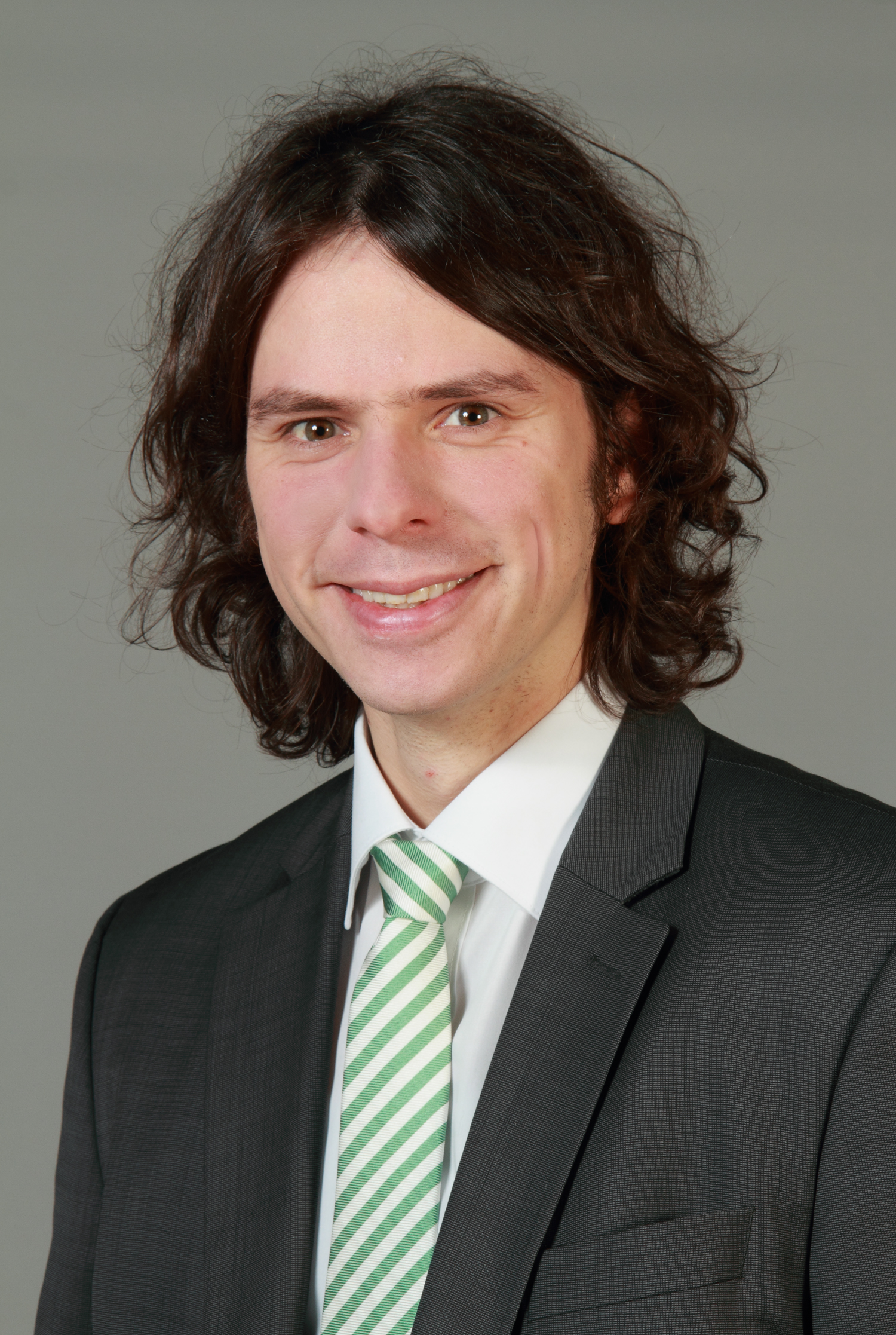
- Bolte in 2013

Member of the Landtag of North Rhine-Westphalia
- In office 9 June 2010 – 1 June 2022

Personal details
- Born: 28 October 1985 (age 40)
- Party: Alliance 90/The Greens (since 2002)

Frederick Matthias Benjamin Bolte-Richter (born 28 October 1985) is a German politician. From 2010 to 2022, he was a member of the Landtag of North Rhine-Westphalia. From 2004 to 2010, he was a city councillor of Bielefeld.
