= Tessa Ganserer =

German politician (born 1977)

Tessa Ganserer MdB
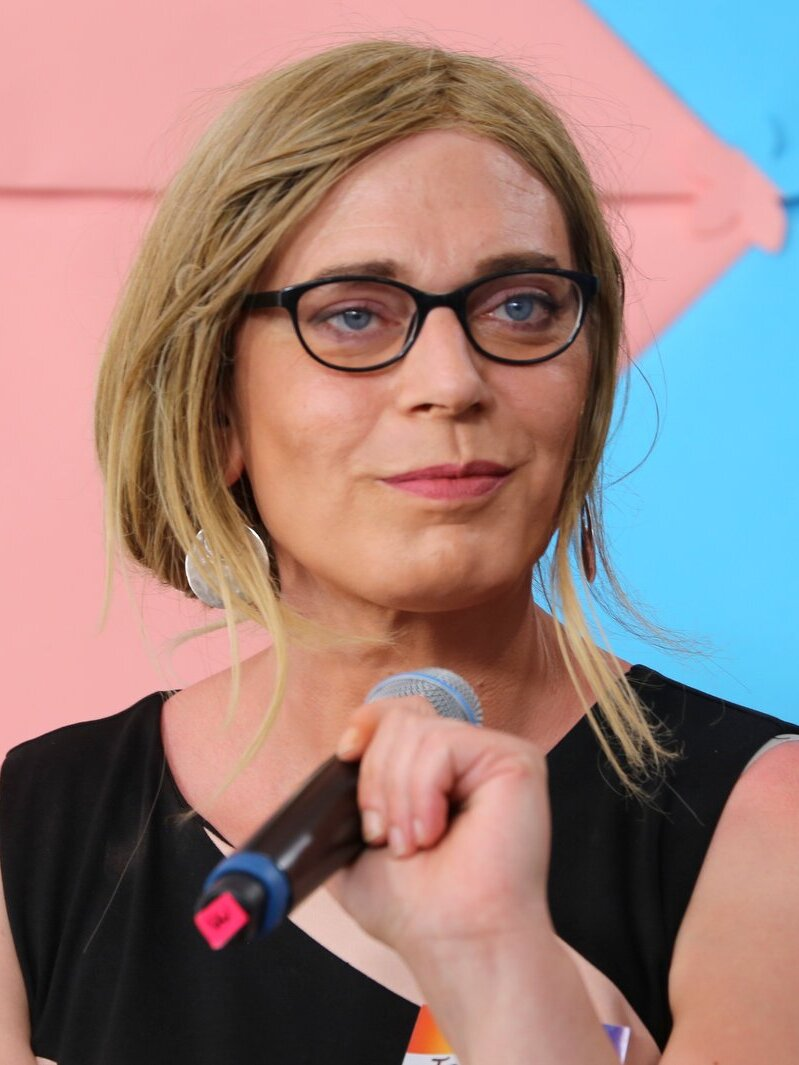
- Ganserer in 2021

Member of the Bundestag for Bavaria
- In office 26 October 2021 – 23 February 2025
- Constituency: Alliance '90/The Greens List

Member of the Landtag of Bavaria for Middle Franconia
- In office 7 October 2013 – 26 October 2021
- Constituency: Alliance '90/The Greens List

Personal details
- Born: 16 May 1977 (age 49) Zwiesel, Bavaria, West Germany
- Party: Alliance 90/The Greens
- Spouse: Ines Eichmüller
- Children: 2
- Education: Weihenstephan-Triesdorf University of Applied Science
- Website: tessa-ganserer.de

Tessa Ganserer (born 16 May 1977) is a German politician who has served as a member of the Bundestag since 26 October 2021. Previously, she was a member of the Landtag of Bavaria, representing the constituency of Middle Franconia on the Alliance '90/The Greens list. In 2018 Ganserer came out as a transgender woman, becoming the first openly transgender person in a German state or federal parliament.

== Early life and career ==
Tessa Ganserer was born on 16 May 1977 in Zwiesel, Bavaria. Ganserer studied forestry and engineering at Weihenstephan-Triesdorf University of Applied Science, and, after graduating in 2005, became a staffer for German politician Christian Magerl.

== Political career ==
=== Early beginnings ===
Ganserer belongs to Alliance 90/The Greens, a green political party, and has been a member since 1998. She ran for a seat in the Landtag of Bavaria in 2008, but was unsuccessful. From 2008 to 2018, she served as the District Executive of the Green Middle Franconia.

=== State politics ===
In the 2013 elections, Ganserer was elected in the Nuremberg North electoral district to sit in the Landtag. She sat on the committees for Economic and Media Affairs, Infrastructure, Construction and Transport, Energy and Technology, and as Vice Chair of Public Service from 2013 until 2018.

In December 2018, Ganserer came out as a transgender woman, becoming the first member of the Landtag of Bavaria and of a German parliament to be openly transgender. She made her first public appearance as a woman at a press conference in Munich on 14 January 2019. Ilse Aigner, a member of the Christian Social Union in Bavaria and President of the Landtag of Bavaria, supported Ganserer in her transition and welcomed her to parliament as a woman. While her gender change has not yet been legally finalized, Ganserer was recognized in the Landtag as a woman.

In 2019, Ganserer pushed for reform to make name changes and sex changes on identity documents more accessible.

=== Member of the German Parliament, 2021–2025 ===
In the 2021 German Federal Election, Ganserer was elected to the Bundestag on the Alliance 90/The Greens list for Bavaria. Because her government records remain unchanged, she was forced to appear on the ballot under her deadname. Along with fellow Green Nyke Slawik, Ganserer became the first openly transgender person elected to the German Parliament.

In parliament, Ganserer has been serving on the Committee on the Environment, Nature Conservation, Nuclear Safety, and Consumer Protection and the Parliamentary Advisory Board on Sustainable Development.

In October 2024, Ganserer announced that she would not stand in the 2025 federal elections but instead resign from active politics by the end of the parliamentary term. Despite acknowledging the toll of the harassment she experienced from colleagues in the Bundestag (especially from AfD members), she instead cited an interest in life outside of politics as her reason.

== Other activities ==
- Magnus Hirschfeld Foundation, Deputy Member of the Board of Trustees (since 2022)

== Personal life ==
Ganserer is married to Ines Eichmüller with whom she has two sons.

Ganserer hadn't changed her legally recorded name and gender in protest against the German Transsexual Law, which requires two psychological evaluations by court-appointed evaluators to validate a person's transgender identity. Ganserer has described these as "degrading compulsory appraisals". The law also used to require sterilization, which was deemed unconstitutional by the Federal Constitutional Court in 2011.

Since then a new law exists, and on 1 August 2024 Ganserer registered the change of her first name and gender entry with the Zwiesel registry office in order to have it take effect on the day the new Self-Determination Act came into force, 1 November, after the required three-month waiting period.

This date has since passed, making the change official.
