= María Clemente García =

Mexican politician

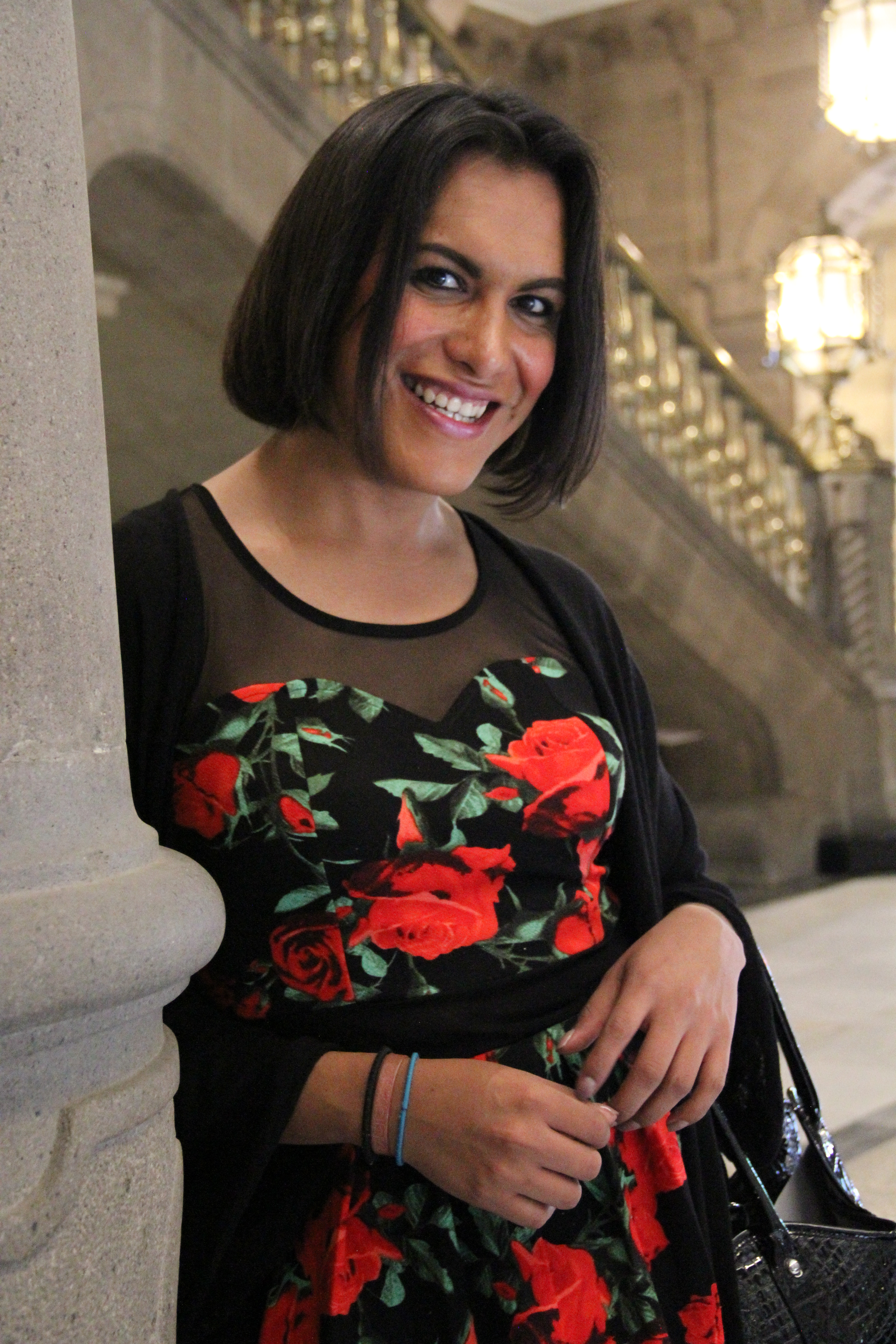

Deputy of the Chamber of Deputies Proportional representation
- Incumbent
- Assumed office 1 September 2021

Personal details
- Born: 11 October 1985 (age 40) Mexico City, Mexico
- Party: Independent
- Other political affiliations: MORENA (until 2022)
- Occupation: Politician

María Clemente García Moreno (born 11 October 1985) is a Mexican politician, sex worker and activist for the rights of sexual diversity. Since 2021, she served as Deputy of the LXV Legislature of the Mexican Congress. Previously a member of Morena, she resigned from the party on 31 March 2022.

== Early years ==
García was born on 11 October 1985 in Mexico City. Throughout her life, she has distinguished herself as an activist for the human rights of the LGBT population and sexual diversity, identifying as a transgender woman.

== Political career ==
Initially, García was a member of the Party of the Democratic Revolution and after the creation of Morena, she joined said party. Morena nominated her in 2021 as a candidate for federal deputy through the plurinominal route as a representative of sexual diversity. She was elected to the LXV Legislature; she was, together with Salma Luévano, the first two deputies who identify themselves as transgender. In the Chamber of Deputies, she serves as secretary of the Commission for Attention to Vulnerable Groups as well as a member of the Diversity Commission.

During her tenure as a deputy, García has denounced several attempts at discrimination that sometimes gave her notoriety in public opinion, one of which was when she denounced ill-treatment towards her in the cafeteria of the Chamber of Deputies. On 31 March 2022, while she was protesting in the rostrum of the Chamber for statements issued by deputy Gabriel Quadri and that were considered transphobic, she clashed with fellow deputy Santiago Creel Miranda, who was presiding over the Chamber session. Later, she apologized to Creel regarding public opinion, in addition to announcing that she was declaring herself from that moment on as a deputy without a party, she also denounced what she considers hypocrisy of the deputies in general, but even of the Morena parliamentary group.
