= Batuco, Santiago =

Locality in Chile

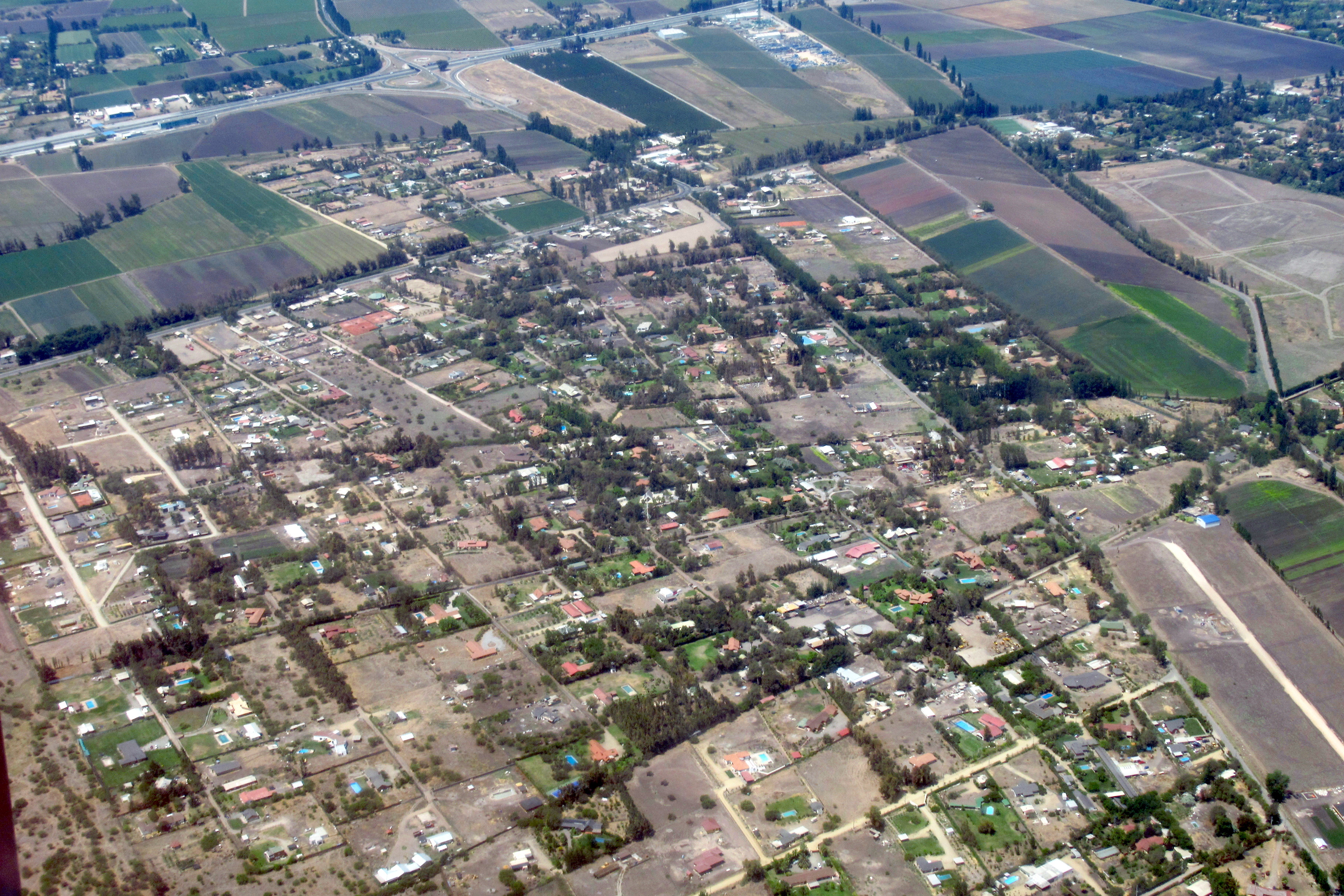
- Part of Batuco from above.

- Location in Chile Batuco, Santiago (South America)
- Coordinates: 33°13′50″S 70°48′33″W
- Country: Chile
- Region: Región Metropolitana de Santiago
- Province: Chacabuco Province
- City: Lampa

Area
  - Total: 3.659 km^{2} (1.413 sq mi)
- Elevation: 650 m (2,130 ft)

Population
  - Total: 16,784
  - Density: 4,587/km^{2} (11,880/sq mi)
- Postal code: 9380000

Batuco is a locality of Chile, situated in the commune of Lampa. Its population was 16,784 as of the 2017 census.

== Geography ==
Batuco is located in the Chacabuco portion of the Santiago Metropolitan Region. Lo Solar lies directly south of Batuco and Huertos Familiares lies directly north of Batuco. Batuco is 17 miles (28 km) northwest from downtown Santiago and 48 miles (77 km) to Valparaíso.

=== Landmarks ===
Approximately 2 miles (3 km) northwest of Batuco, exists a lagoon commonly known as the Batuco lagoon with a surface area of about 300 hectares. A majority of the land around the lagoon is a wetland. Together, the lagoon and wetland are known for their variety of bird species. The lagoon also contains large levels of nutrients, phosphorus, nitrogen and chlorophyll.

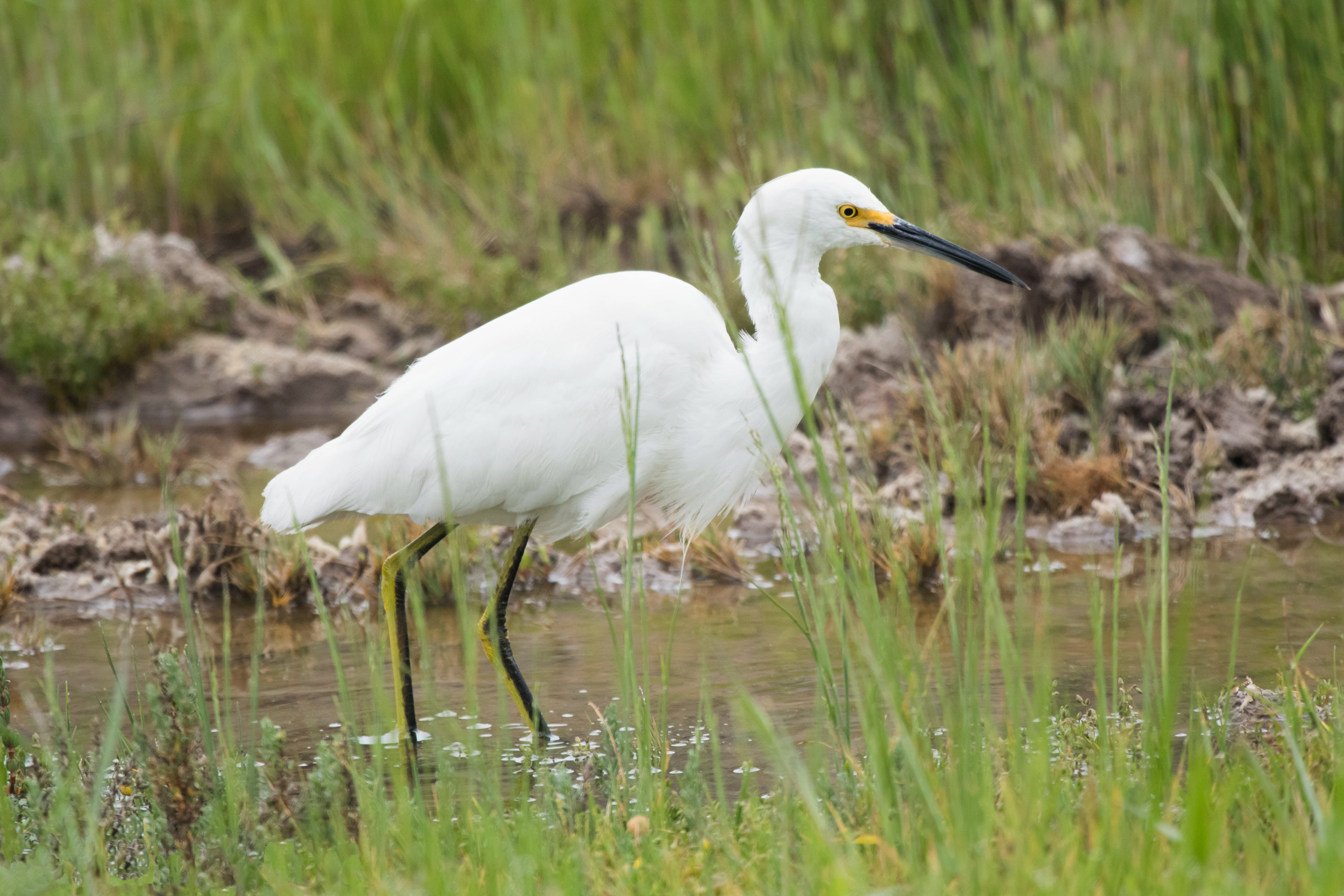
A snowy egret in the wetlands near Batuco lagoon.

== Gallery ==
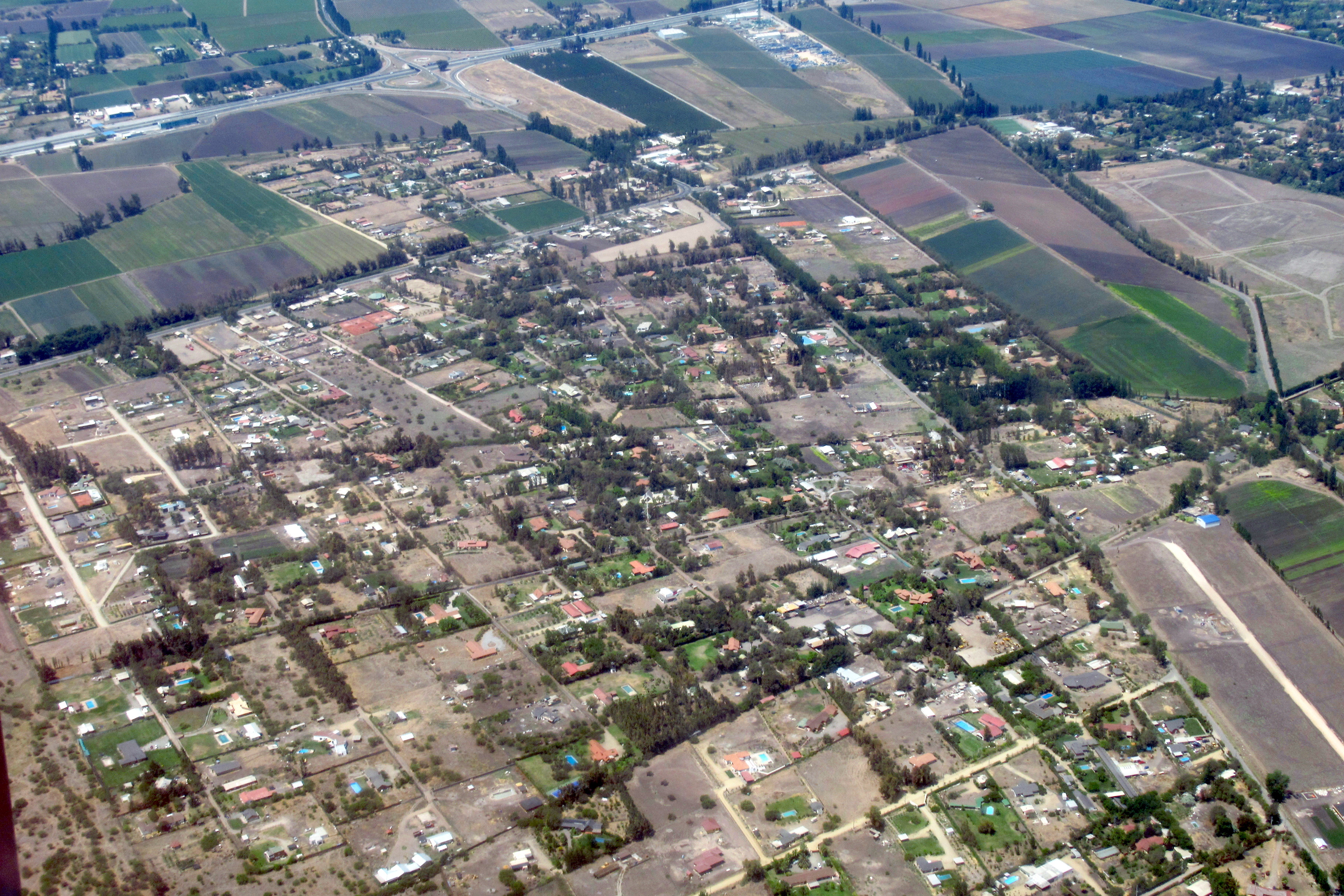
Part of Batuco from above.

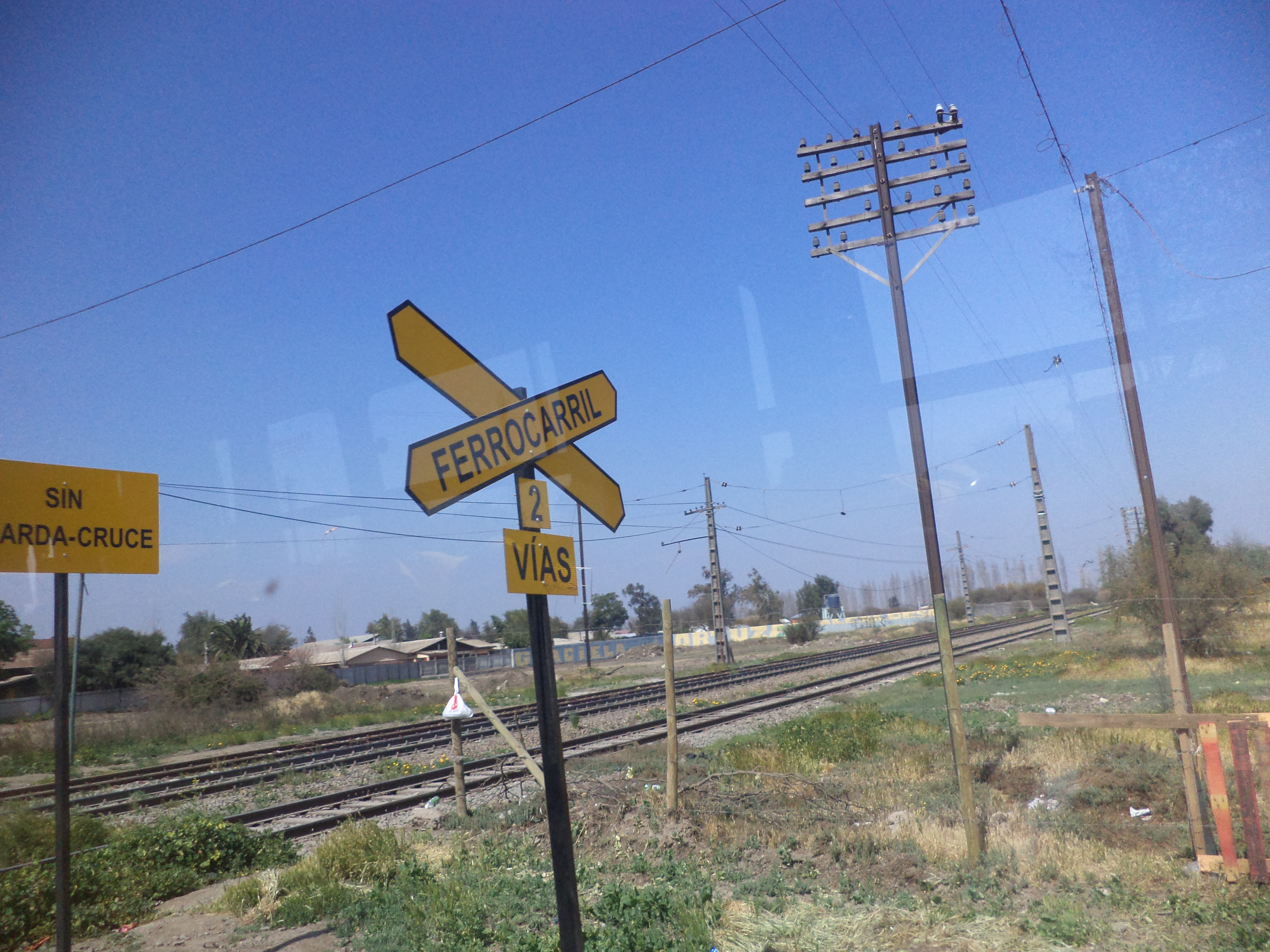
Abandoned railroad in Batuco.

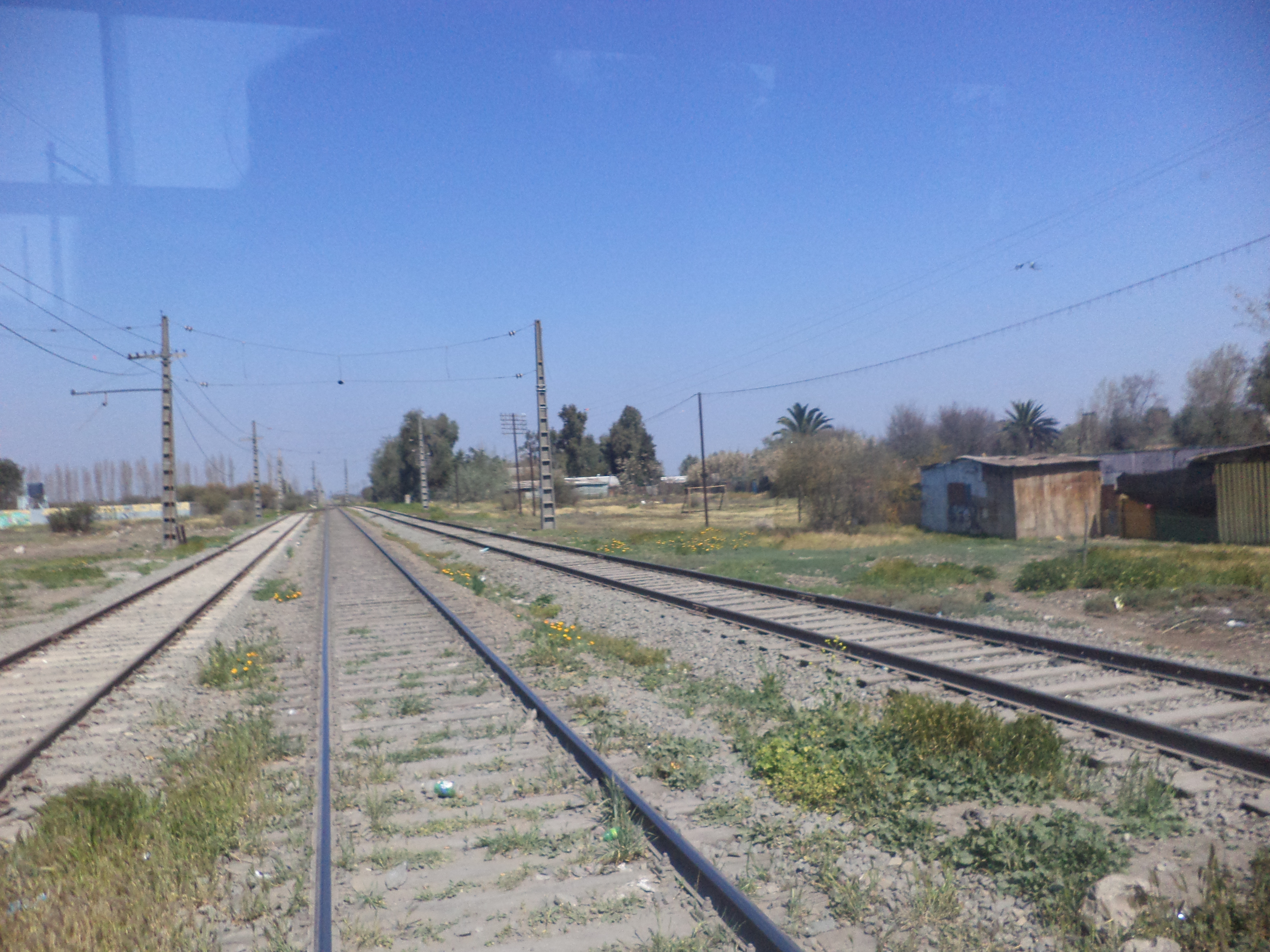
Alternative view of an abandoned railroad in Batuco.

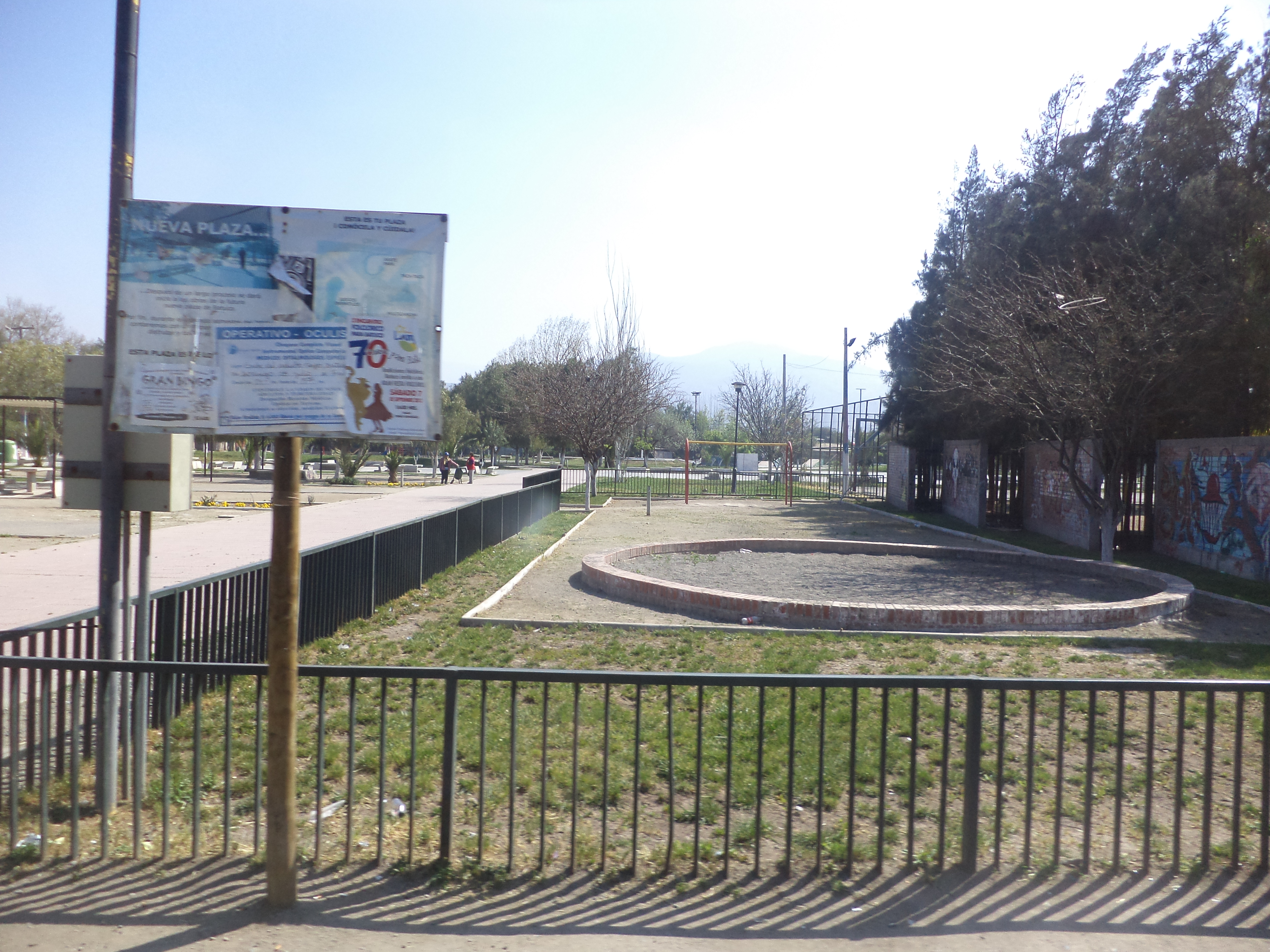
Main plaza in Batuco.

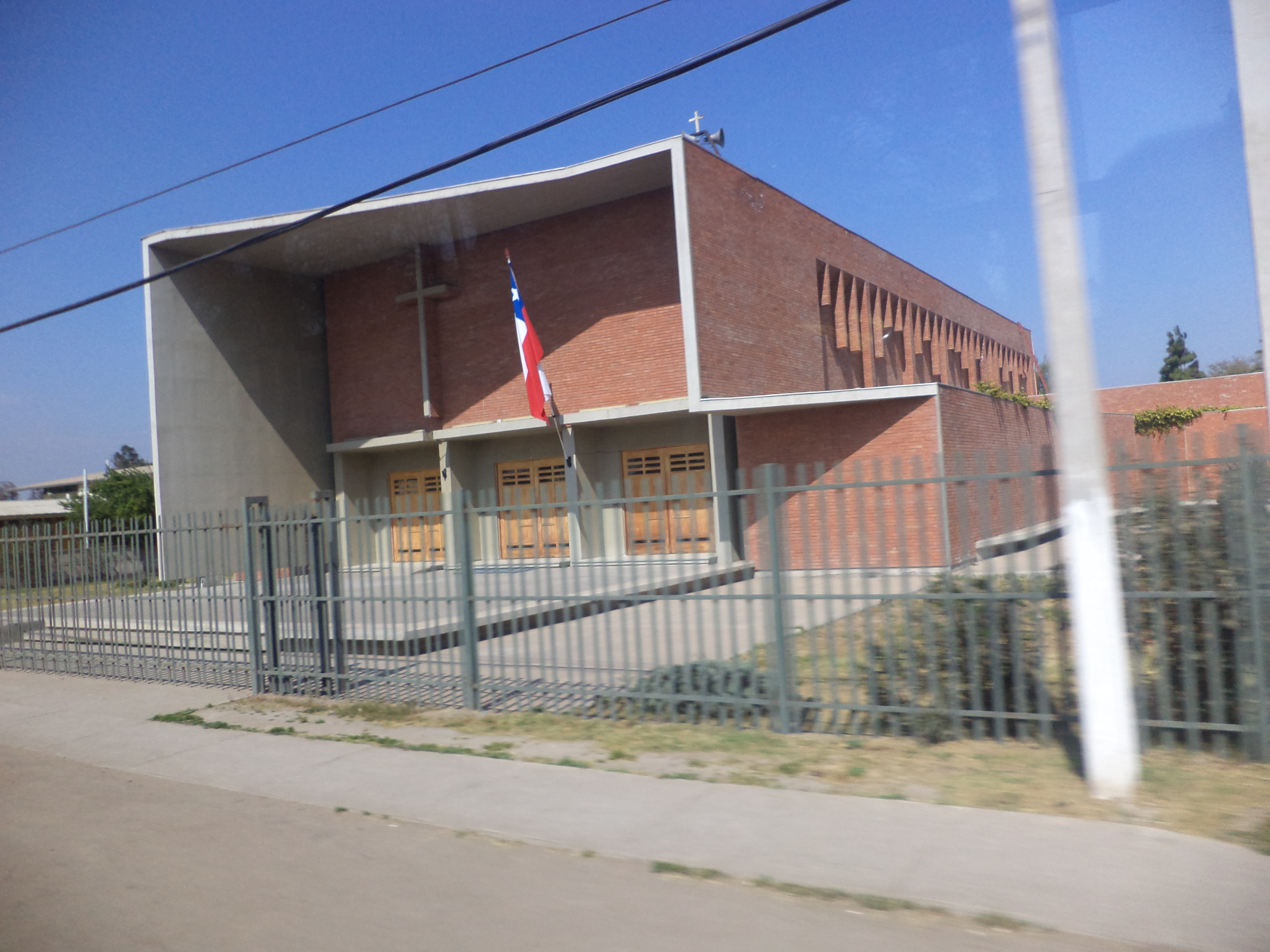
Catholic church in Batuco.

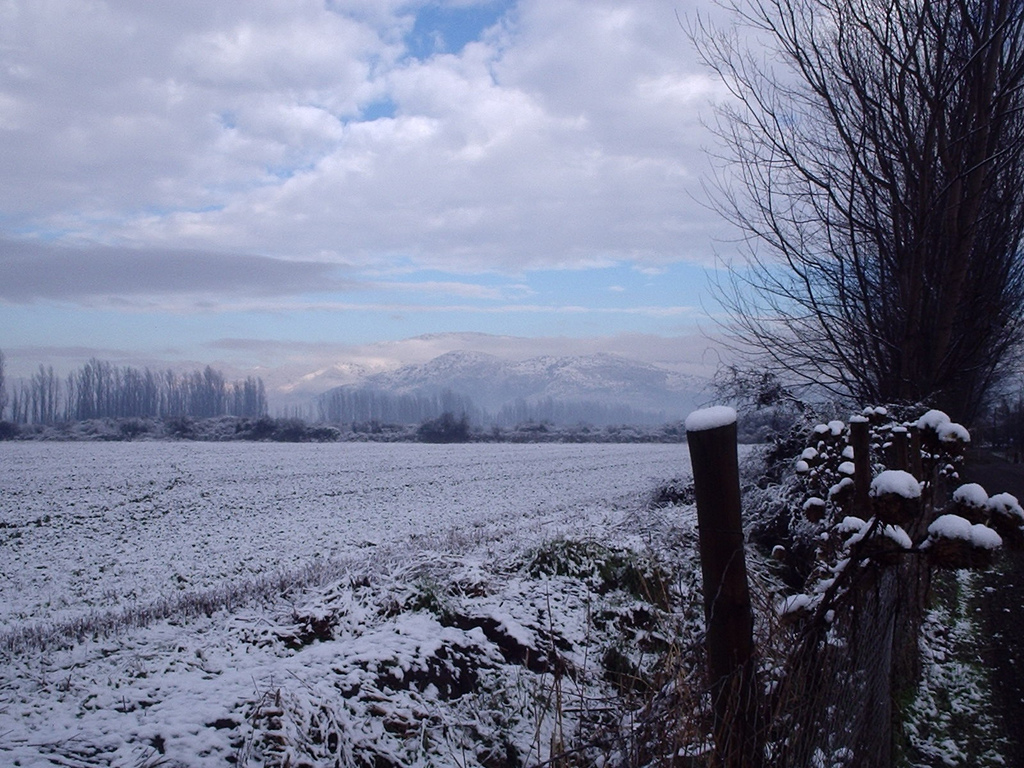
Snowy field in Batuco.

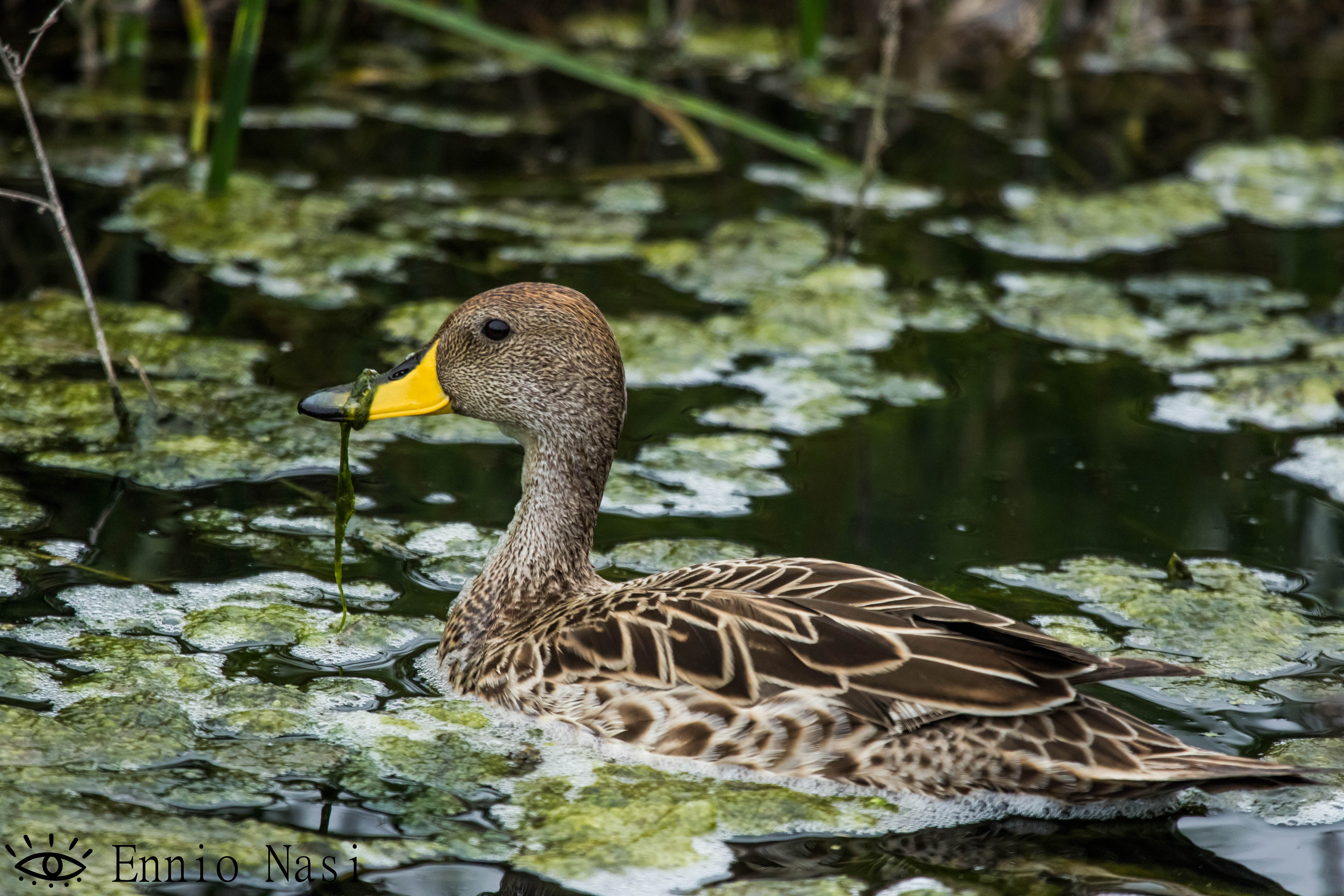
Yellow-billed teal in the Batuco wetlands.
