= ADESPROC Freedom =

Bolivian LGBTQ+ organization

- Association for Social Development and Cultural Promotion Liberty
- Asociación de Desarrollo Social y Promoción Cultural
- Established: 1996
- Type: Nonprofit organization
- Website: adesproc.org

ADESPROC Freedom (Spanish: ADESPROC Libertad, short for Asociación de Desarrollo Social y Promoción Cultural, transl. Association for Social Development and Cultural Promotion), is a nonprofit organization started in 1996 in La Paz, Bolivia. Since its start, it has spread to other cities in the country. They are focused on LGBT rights at a national level. Their core focuses are rights for the LGBT community, sexual and reproductive health, and political influence.

== History ==
ADESPROC Freedom started in response to the violent dispersal and arrest of 120 people done by the police in 1995 during Cherry's police raid. Cherry's Bar was a refuge for many people in the LGBT community and was a target of homophobic violence and criminalization. In response to these threats, the LGBT community founded ADESPROC.

== Activist Work ==
ADESPROC Freedom has been committed to the cause of LGBT+ liberation since its inception in 1996. They are part of ilgalac, the Bolivian Coalition of the LGBT Collective, the Citizen Coalition Against Torture, Sin Violencia LGBTIQ+, and the Bolivian Community of Human Rights, among others. They have worked with the Higher University of San Andrés to challenge prejudices and preconceived notions in tandem with their Law and Political Science department as well.

As part of their involvement in the Bolivian Community of Human Rights, they aid in compiling reports of LGBT+ specific human rights issues and successes in Bolivia alongside alongside more than 50 other organizations.

== Involvement in La Paz Pride ==
Before there was an official La Paz Pride, ADESPROC Freedom organized various activities to commemorate International LGBTQ Pride Day in La Paz. In 2003, ADESPROC Freedom, alongside Mujeres Creando, organized the first La Paz pride parade.

In 2005, ADESPROC Freedom held a march in addition to the regularly scheduled pride parade to mark the Fourth National LGBT Congress which was happening in La Paz that year. During the 2007 incident where a molotov cocktail was thrown at participants of La Paz Pride, the director of ADESPROC Freedom, Alberto Moscoso was injured.

== See also ==
- La Paz Pride
- LGBTQ history in Bolivia
- LGBTQ rights in Bolivia
- LGBTQ culture in Bolivia
- Mujeres Creando
