= LGBTQ history in Bolivia =

LGBTQ history in Bolivia has its roots in the indigenous cultures of the Andes, such as the Incas and Aymara, which had wide and diverse perception of gender and sexuality. However, the arrival of the Spanish and subsequent colonization of the region imposed Christian values and morality, which resulted in sexual diversity being persecuted.

== Pre-Columbian era ==
In the Pre-Columbian era, the situation of homosexual people was highly varied due to the plurality of the different indigenous ethnic groups.

=== Incas ===
According to historian and conquistador Pedro Cieza de León, unlike the rest of the Incan Empire, Northern parts (such as Chinchaysuyo) tolerated homosexuality and even considered it to be a part of religion, with male brothels existing to cater to the needs of (male) troops. These male prostitutes, along with their female counterparts, were known as pampayruna; both adorned dresses typically worn only by women.

Additionally, the Inca had a special consideration for lesbians, who they called holjoshta. Cápac Yupanqui had a particular affection to these women. However, in the central and southern parts of the empire, homosexuality was severely punished. According to Martin de Murua, Lloque Yupanqui would severely punish sodomy along with theft and murder by cutting off various body parts, and for nobles by cutting their necks or ripping their shirts. Inca Garcilaso de la Vega similarly stated that homosexuality was criminalized, and that so-called 'sodomites' were burned alive.

=== Aymara ===
In the Aymara culture, homosexuals were treated as special people and often considered to possess magic powers, and were recognized for their ability to be shamans.

In actuality, there is a difference of opinion between Aymara communities. According to some groups' beliefs, homosexuality was equated with infidelity and some maintain a position of intolerance, punishing homosexuals and excluding them from rituals. According to these same groups' superstitions, homosexuality is a bringer of bad luck. However, it is true that some other communities have a certain degree of acceptance, respect, and understanding of diverse sexual orientations, also thanks to the wider spread of modes of communication and education.

=== Other ethnic groups ===
It is said that the Guaraní, Mojeños, Chiquitano, Ava Guaraní, and other indigenous groups from the east of Bolivia or from the Amazon region also practiced a certain degree of acceptance towards homosexual people before the arrival of the Spanish, since there was no concern to be had. Being an openly homosexual man was not considered bad; nevertheless, acting like a woman constituted an offense. Two men taking hands together was a high sign of friendship and fraternity.

== Colonial era ==
The arrival of the Spanish and creation of the Real Audiencia of Charcas beneath the dominion of the Spanish Empire brought a new political, social, cultural, and religious system. Together with the diffusion of Christianity and the elimination of ancestral pre-Columbian beliefs and practices, homophobia and also other systems of discrimination (racism, classism, and misogyny), it became common for homosexuality to be discriminated against in Bolivia, along with the rest of Spanish America and other colonial holdings.

The Catholic Church condemned any indigenous practice that contradicted their dogma, considering them mortal and demonic sins. As such, many homosexual indigenous people were sentenced to death in the colonial era. There were even homosexual people with Spanish heritage, such as criollos and mestizos, who participated in clandestine sexual relations to avoid persecution, who if caught were reprimanded and sentenced to death on orders of the church and crown.

There are several examples from this era of punishment of homosexuals that show the influence of the Catholic Church. In 1593, Antonio Pantoja of Chuquisaca was burned at the stake for participating in sodomy with an African slave, and purportedly wholly accepted his fate as he believed he had sinned grievously.

In October 1803 in La Plata, Antonio Yta was denounced by his wife, Martina Vilvado y Balverde, after she discovered he had a feminine body, menstruated, and refused to engage in sexual intercourse. Following court proceedings and an investigation, Yta revealed that he was born female, originally named María Leocadia Yta, and had been a nun in Spain before moving to South America. Although it is impossible to know Yta's exact identity as he has long since passed away and many LGBTQ-related terms did not exist yet, it is possible that he was a transgender man.

== Republican era ==
In 1831, the first Criminal Code of Bolivia was passed and came into enforcement the following year. It did not have any provision on sodomy, and thereafter homosexual relations were legalized in the country.

=== 20th century ===
The first half of the 20th century saw the birth of various artists that would be pioneers in the inclusion of LGBTQ people in their respective regions. In 1924, the gay composer Gerardo Rosas was born. Also called Q'ewa Rosas (from the Quechua word q'ewa; meaning "maricón" in Spanish, which is like the English word "queer" used as a noun), between the 1950s and his death in 1984 he was well known in the chicha bars of Sucre as a composer, singer, and dancer.

In 1955, the novel Erebo by Paul Gumiel was published, which is considered the first work of literature from Bolivia that openly addressed the homosexuality of its protagonist.

In the 1960s and 70s, the "china morena" personality became popular. Originally played by gay men, they appear in festivals in Bolivia and pioneered visibility of travestis and trans women in popular dance, through the involvement and innovation of several trans women in the tradition. Carlos Espinoza, known as "Ofelia" or "la Gran Ofelia," can be credited with creating the personality, having been inspired by the aesthetic of vedettes from this era.

During the dictatorships of Juan José Torres (1970-1971) and Hugo Banzer (1971-1978), the persecution of LGBTQ people continued in a persistent manner. An outstanding case happened on 15 May 1971, when a police raid occurred in La Paz, where a party to celebrate the coronation of Barbarella (Peter Alaiza) as the queen of a group of gay people and travestis called "Mysterious Queens Club" was taking place. 12 of the detained were dressed in feminine clothing. In 1975, the "china morena" tradition was outlawed under the dictatorship of Hugo Banzer after Barbarella kissed him during an act. Afterwards, the tradition still appeared in rural festivals.

The 1990s saw the birth of the first LGBTQ organizations in Bolivia: one of the first was the association of Mujeres Creando, founded in 1992 by María Galindo and focused primarily on lesbofeminist advocacy. In the same year, the group Grupo Dignidad emerged in Cochabamba, which was the first LGBTQ organizations in Bolivia to have significant visibility. At the same time, the first organizations of travestis also began to emerge, like the Union of Travestis of Santa Cruz (founded 16 September 1996), the Association of Travestis La Paz (founded 1997), and the Union of Travestis of Cochabamba (founded 1999).

=== 21st century ===
On 27 June 2000, the first Pride parade in Bolivia took place in Santa Cruz, and after 2002 also in La Paz.

Since the beginning of the administration of Evo Morales and the proclamation of the new Constitution of Bolivia, all types of discrimination (including homophobia) have been prohibited in the country.

There was controversy in April 2010 when then-president Morales engaged in discourse about diet, claiming that the meat of chicken contained "feminine hormones" and caused men to become homosexual. The LGBTQI community both inside and outside of Bolivia called the president's statements homophobic, and in May of the same year Morales apologized for them, saying that his words were misinterpreted and assuring that his administration had gay people in it.

José Manuel Canelas Jaime was elected as legislator in the 2014 Bolivian general election, becoming the first openly gay politician to hold office in Bolivia's history. In 2015, the drag queen and activist Carlos Felipe Parra Heredia, better known as París Galán, became the first cross-dresser elected to the Departmental Legislative Assembly of La Paz.

On 21 May 2016, the Plurinational Legislative Assembly of Bolivia enacted Law No. 807 that affirmed the gender identity of transgender people by allowing name changes, updated sex markers and images in all public and private documents.

== See also ==
- LGBTQ culture in Bolivia
- LGBTQ rights in Bolivia
