= Santa Cruz de la Sierra Pride =

Annual LGBTQ event in Santa Cruz de la Sierra, Bolivia

- Genre: Pride parade
- Frequency: Annually
- Locations: Santa Cruz de la Sierra, Bolivia
- Inaugurated: June 27th, 2000

Santa Cruz de la Sierra Pride, also known as the LGBT Pride Parade of Santa Cruz de la Sierra (Spanish: Marcha del Orgullo LGBT de Santa Cruz de la Sierra), is a political demonstration that is celebrated annually in the city of Santa Cruz de la Sierra, Bolivia to commemorate International LGBTQ Pride Day. The event was first celebrated in 2000 and was the first pride parade in the history of Bolivia. Although the first parade was interrupted by acts of violence, the parade is now considered an established tradition of the city.

Every year during the parade, people under the sexually diverse umbrella and straight allies attend the march carrying rainbow flags and banners to denounce discrimination and inequality. Additionally there are floats, dancing, and music with inclusive messages of diversity.

Over time the parade has grown in size. In its first year, there were 50 participants but in 2022 it exceeded 1,000 people. Since 2018, the demonstration has been divided into two parades. The first is a more political parade that is celebrate June 28 and runs from the Plaza 24 de Septiembre to the Governor's building. The second is known as the allegorical parade and is celebrated the Saturday following June 28. This parade is characterized by a more festive mood and a route that runs from Manzana Uno to the Plaza del Estudiante.

== History ==
=== Background and the first march (2000) ===
Before the first pride parade was celebrated, LGBT activists from Santa Cruz belonging to Uneldys (Unidos en la Lucha por la Dignidad y Salud, trans. United in the Fight for Dignity and Health) commemorated International LGBTQ Pride Day since 1994 with private events in nightclubs. That year, the celebration occurred on June 28 and consisted of a beauty pagent and educational campaign. The idea of commemorating June 28 with a pride parade was first promoted by the American activist Timothy Wright, who was one of the founders of Uneldys and showed local activists photographs and videos of demonstrations in other countries as inspiration.

After discussing the idea for a few years, members of Uneldys decided to finally hold the first parade in 2000. The original idea was to hold it in the Plaza 24 de Septiembre, but because of the denial of the authorities and opposition from representatives of the Catholic Church. they decided to have it in the Parque Urbano Central instead. Despite having the required permits, the event attracted disapproval from the Evangelical Church. Among the disapproving voices was Pastor Eladio Álvarez, who went on a hunger strike in response to the demonstration. Three days before the date, a press conference was held to announce the event. Afterwards, activists from Uneldys began to receive calls telling them to cancel the march "to respect morality and good customs," but this made them more determined.

The march, which took place on June 27, 2000, had the motto "So that You and I can Recognize Each Other in Our Differences." It was the first pride parade in Bolivian history. Before the event started, various activists were accosted by journalists and religious groups who gathered near Parque Urbano. After starting the parade, once the participants advanced about thirty meters, an unknown person threw a tear gas canister at them. The participants decided to continue walking. During the procession, the majority of bystanders were supportive. Despite this, when the march turned in the direction of Segundo Anillo, a right-wing group, the Unión Juvenil Cruceñista, attacked some marchers. The attackers intended to throw rocks and beat those in the parade. In response, the police threw tear gas at all present, disbanding the demonstration.

=== 2001 parade ===
In 2001, members of Uneldys decided to insist upon holding the march in the Plaza 24 de Septiembre, as they were seeking the defense of the Ombudsman's Office of Bolivia. Despite initial rejections, the route was finally approved by the mayor and included the Plaza 24 de Septiembre, the Cathedral Basilica of St. Lawrence, and the buildings of the mayor's office and prefecture. According to the activist Timothy Wright, the mayor's office granted the permits because of pressure due to the suddenness of the request, help from the Ombudsman's Office, and due to the fact that the march coencided with a time during which the city was attempting to present a more modern image. The largest opposition to the event was from the evangelical pastor Eladio Álvarez, who did a two day long hunger strike as protest.

The march occurred on June 28 between 8:00 and 10:00pm and had about 10,000 attendees. Of these, about 200 were vendors and the rest were observers who came to witness the event due to its novelty. Alongside Uneldys, the parade had other groups participate including the Unión de Travestis Santa Cruz and Mario Hígado's activist group. A difference from the previous year was that there were no physical attacks against participants, though some were victims of insults by passersby. The parade had a considerable impact on the local press and was the focus of public conversation for weeks. Because of this, in following years, the mayor looked for ways to prevent the parade from being permitted to use the same route.

=== The march's growth (2002 to 2021) ===
The 2002 parade once again crossed the Plaza 24 de Septiembre. It was also proceeded by a forum about issues relating to sexual diversity that took place at the local newspaper El Deber's office. However, the following year they could not hold the march in the same area due to a local law that forbid demonstrations in this area. Because of this, the 2003 march occurred at Avenida Landívar.

The 2004 march took place on June 26 and had 200 attendees. During this year, the event changed its name. While it was originally known as the Gay Pride Parade, it began using the name LGBT Pride Parade in 2004. Due to the fact that it was on Avenida Landívar, which is considered a minor urban road, this event did not have as many observers. Avenida Landívar continued to be the epicenter of marches the following years, all the way up until 2012. That year the march was led by Ninon Vidangos.

In 2014, the march was on June 28 and among its demands was approval of domestic partnerships for same-sex couples. It had the motto "My Family, My Rights, My Diversity." It's route started at the Plaza 24 de Septiembre and ended at the Plaza del Estudiante.

The 2017 march featured the boxer Jennifer Salinas, who had announced she was attracted to the same sex in February 2016. The following year, the city had two parades. The first was on June 28 and went from the Palacio de Justicia to the Plaza 24 de Septiembre. The second parade was two days later and went from the Manzana Uno to the Plaza del Estudiante. This one emphasized the necessity of creating labor policies that helped LGBT people obtain employment with the motto "Because Working is a Right."

Because of the COVID-19 pandemic, the march was canceled in 2020 and 2021 and in its place were virtual events.

=== Recent parades (since 2022) ===
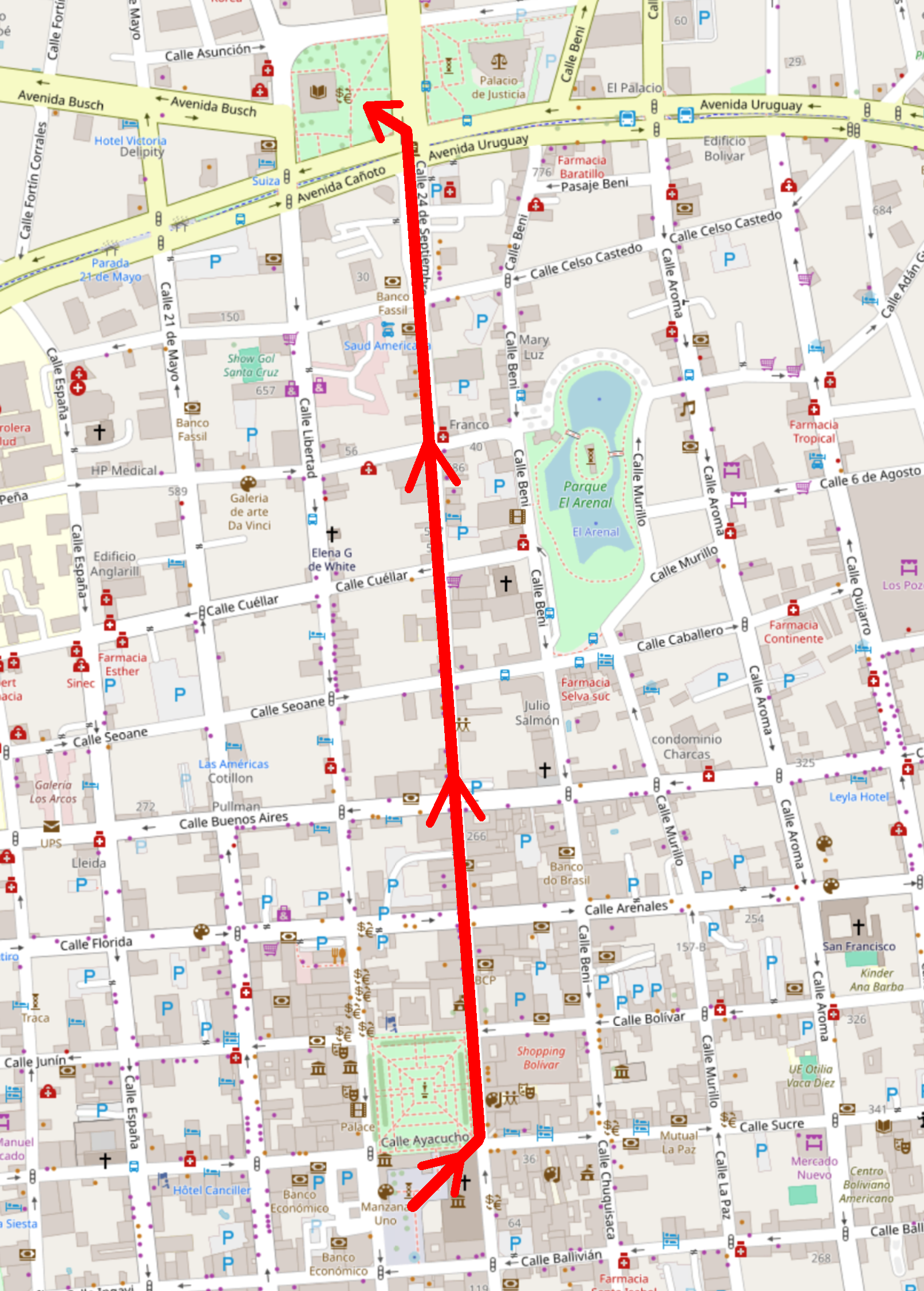
Traditional route of the LGBT Pride Parade in Santa Cruz de la Sierra. It starts at Manzana Uno and goes until the Plaza del Estudiante.

In 2022, the demonstration consisted of two parades. The first, which was characterized as more political, was on June 28 and consisted of hundreds of activists marching from the Palacio de Justicia to the City Hall while requesting the local authorities respect their rights and listen to their demands. They also wanted to show their discontent with the attempts to cancel the art exhibition Revolución Orgullo which was being displayed that year in the city's Museo El Altillo. The second parade was on July 2 and had a more festive mood and more than 2,000 attendees.

During the 2023 political march, LGBT activists painted a crosswalk next to the governance building with the colors of the rainbow flag. This occurred again during the 2024 political march. The 2024 march had the same route as the years before, starting at the Plaza 24 de Septiembre and ending at the City Hall. The joyful march was the next day, June 29, and went from the Manzana Uno until the Plaza del Estudiante, where there was a verbena with unique artistic events. In 2024 there was also the first pride parade in Palmasola Prison in Santa Cruz. This event was historic and included the participation of around fifty LGBT prisoners who marched in the field of one of the wings.

The 2025 parade was noteworthy for being the first time that the mayor of Santa Cruz helped publicize the event, which was done via the Secretary of Tourism. The political march this year occurred on June 27, while the second, which was called the commemorative march, took place on June 28.

== See also ==
- Pride celebrations in Bolivia
- LGBTQ rights in Bolivia
- La Paz Pride

== Bibliography ==
- Aruquipa, David; Estenssoro, Paula; Vargas, Pablo (2012). Memorias Colectivas Miradas a la Historia del Movimiento TLGB de Bolivia [Collective Memories: Looks at the History of the LGBT Movement in Bolivia] (PDF) (in Spanish). Conexión Fondo de Emancipación. Archived from the original (PDF) on 2019-10-29.
- Wright, Timothy (2006). "Bolivia - Making Gays in a Queer Place: AIDS, Modernization, and the Politics of Sexual Identity". University of California Los Angeles Disertations and Theses. University of California. Archived from the original on 2026-06-05.
