= LGBTQ culture in Bolivia =

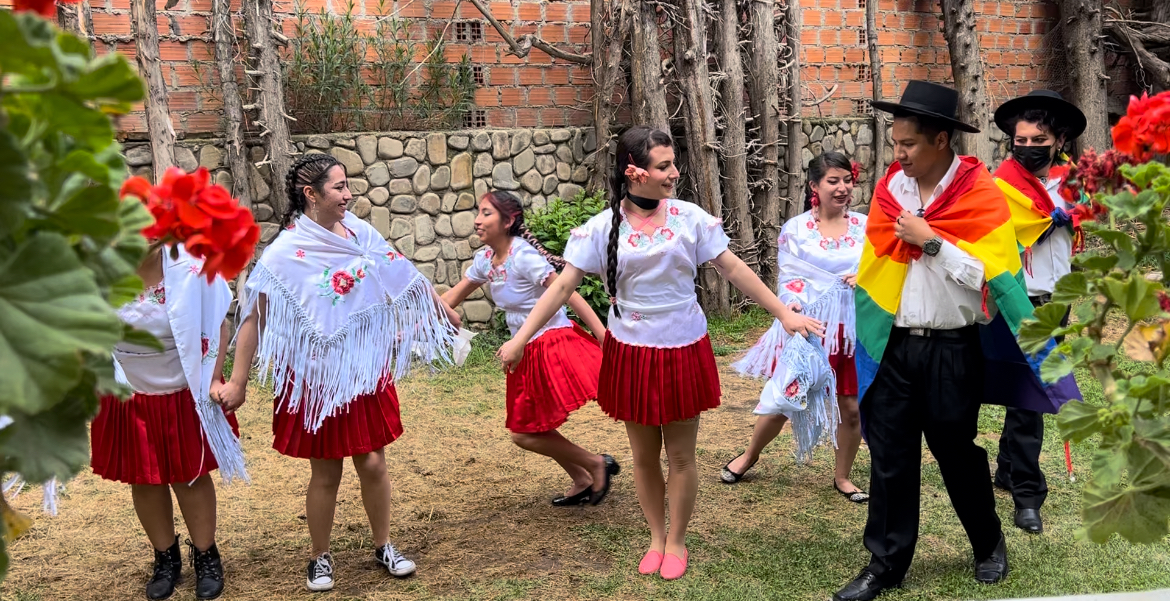
A diverse cueca in the city of La Paz.

LGBTQ culture in Bolivia consists of various arts and entertainment events in the country which focus on sexual or gender diversity or feature the participation of LGBT people.

== Cinema ==
One of the most well known figures of LGBT cinema in Bolivia is Rodrigo Bellott, who has directed multiple movies with LGBT characters and themes. His drama Perfidia (2009) follows a gay man who arrives at a hotel in New York City and locks himself in a room after the end of a romantic relationship. A decade later, Bellott directed the film Tu me manques (2019), which tells the story of a father who journeys to the United States to speak with his son's boyfriend after his son's suicide to learn more about his life. The movie premiered at Outfest Film Festival, where it won best screenplay. Additionally, it was selected to represent Bolivia as their entry for the category of Best International Feature Film at the Academy Awards, and for the category Best Ibero-American Film at the Goya Awards.

After the success of Tu me manques, the next film Bellott directed was the horror film Buey rojo sangre (2022). This film stars a gay couple that travels from the United States to Bolivia who begin to experience hallucinations after killing an ox they found injured on a highway.

Another notable LGBTQ film from Bolivia is the comedy Las Malcogidas (2017), directed by Denisse Arancibia. Las Malcogidas follows an overweight woman with a transgender sister named Karmen who is much skinnier than her and has won the title of "Miss Trans" multiple times. According to Arancibia, one of her objectives in making the film was to challenge stereotypes that LGBT characters usually have in comedies.

Since 2008, the city of La Paz has put on the Festival de Cine, Diversidad Sexual y Derechos Humanos (trans. Film Festival of Diverse Sexualities and Human Rights), whose objective is to present films which tackle topics relating to sexual diversity. Since 2015, it has been aided by the Spanish Cultural Center of La Paz. Additionally, there have been LGBT film festivals in the city of Santa Cruz de la Sierra as well.

== Literature ==
=== Early representation ===
One of the earliest Bolivian written references to homosexual acts appears in the book Historia de la Villa Imperial de Potosí (1705), where its author, the historian Bartolomé Arzáns de Orsúa y Vela, describes some "Indian sodomites" who died after being struck by lighting as "divine punishment" for having sexual relations between men.

The first work of Bolivian literature that openly addresses homosexuality was the novel Erebo (1955), by Pablo Gumiel. The name Pablo Gumiel was assumed to be a pseudonym due to a lack of any easily found biographical information, but later investigation has revealed that it was the author's real name. Erebo is a novel with Romantic influences that tells the story of Jacob, a gay man who is described as blond, delicate, and with artistic tendencies. In a hotel room, Jacob reads a letter to his lover about his life and the many hardships he has suffered socially due to his sexuality, from the discrimination he faced a child to the tragic death of his first love. Faced with their inability to confront social prejudices, they both decide to commit suicide at the end of the book.

Another work considered foundational to LGBT literature in Bolivia is the novel Los papeles de Narciso Lima-Achá (1991), by Jaime Sáenz. Originally written in the 1960s, it was published posthumously. The novel tells the story of Narciso Lima Achá, a Bolivian man who travels to Nazi Germany and meets a young man named Elbruz Ulme, to whom he is attracted and quickly begins a romantic relationship with. During his stay in Germany, Narciso begins a journey of self-discovery and subsequently has relationships with other men, but Elbruz remains the most important figure in his emotional life.

Additional works from the 1990s with LGBT characters include the novel American Visa (1994), by Juan de Recacoechea. In American Visa, the protagonist, a teacher named Mario Álvarez, moves to a hotel in La Paz and among his new neighbors is a transvestite known as Gardenia. Additionally noteworthy are the stories and chronicles of Victor Huga Viscarra, who depicted homosexual and lesbian characters in his works, including Relatos de Víctor Hugo (1996), Borracho estaba pero me acuerdo (2002) and Avisos necrológicos (2005).

=== 21st century ===
Contemporary Bolivian authors who have addressed LGBT themes in their works include Edson Hurtado, Rosario Aquim and Albanella Chávez. At the beginning of the 21st century the crime fiction novel Periférica Blvd. (2004), by Adolfo Cárdenas Franco, was published. Periférica Blvd. includes depictions of homosexual and lesbian characters and dedicates an entire chapter to drag queens.

The 21st century was also when works with lesbian characters written by women began to emerge in Bolivian literature. One prominent example is the British author based in Bolivia, Alison Spedding, who first explored this topic in her science fiction novel, De cuando en cuando Saturnina (2004). Set in the future, the novel's protagonist is a space navigator, an Indianist, and an anarcha-feminist lesbian. Her following novel, Catre de fierro (2015), tells the story of a family that supports the Revolutionary Nationalist Movement around 1952. Among the characters is Delfina, a woman who begins an affair behind her husband's back with her feminist friend Lissete. This relationship later becomes more serious. The romance between the two is described in detail and explicitly by Spedding, as shown in the following quote:

No hay cosa que más me guste que deslizar mis dedos entre tus labios lubricados, hundirlos en tus líquidos tibios, sentir cómo esa boca ya excitada se extiende y se aprieta como garganta ansiosa envolviendo mi mano, y cómo cuando estás por llegar al clímax te pones tan, tan estrecha...

There is nothing I like more than sliding my fingers between your lubricated lips, sinking them into your warm liquids, feeling how that already arroused mouth spreads and tightens like an eager throat enveloping my hand, and how when you are close to climaxing you become so, so tight...

Other recent works that explore lesbian love are the novels Y sin embargo... (2017), by Lourdes Reynaga, which follows the story of a mother and daughter in two timelines, the latter of whom begins a romantic relationship with a woman named Emma; and Ovejas negras (2021), a novel by Adriana Suárez in which Suárez recounts her own experience coming out as a bisexual woman during her adolescence.

Regarding nonfiction literature, the 2010s saw an increase in the number of investigative works and chronicles which address LGBT themes. Published in 2012, Memorias Colectivas: Miradas a la historia del movimiento TLGB en Bolivia by David Aruquipa, Paula Estenssoro Velaochaga y Pablo C. Vargas, compiles a series of articles about LGBT pioneers in Bolivia, including the folklore singer Gerardo Rosas. Also noteworth is the writer and journalist Edson Hurtado who published multiple books about the experiences of LGBT Bolivians, particularly indigenous individuals, including Ser gay en tiempos de Evo (2011) and Indígenas homosexuales (2014), which was later republished under the title La Madonna de Sorata: Crónicas sobre indígenas homosexuales. LGBT organizations like Maricas Bolivia have also published works, including Gay discreto busca hetero curioso (2018), in which they investigate the lives of gay men in contemporary Bolivian cities through chronicles and photographic reports.

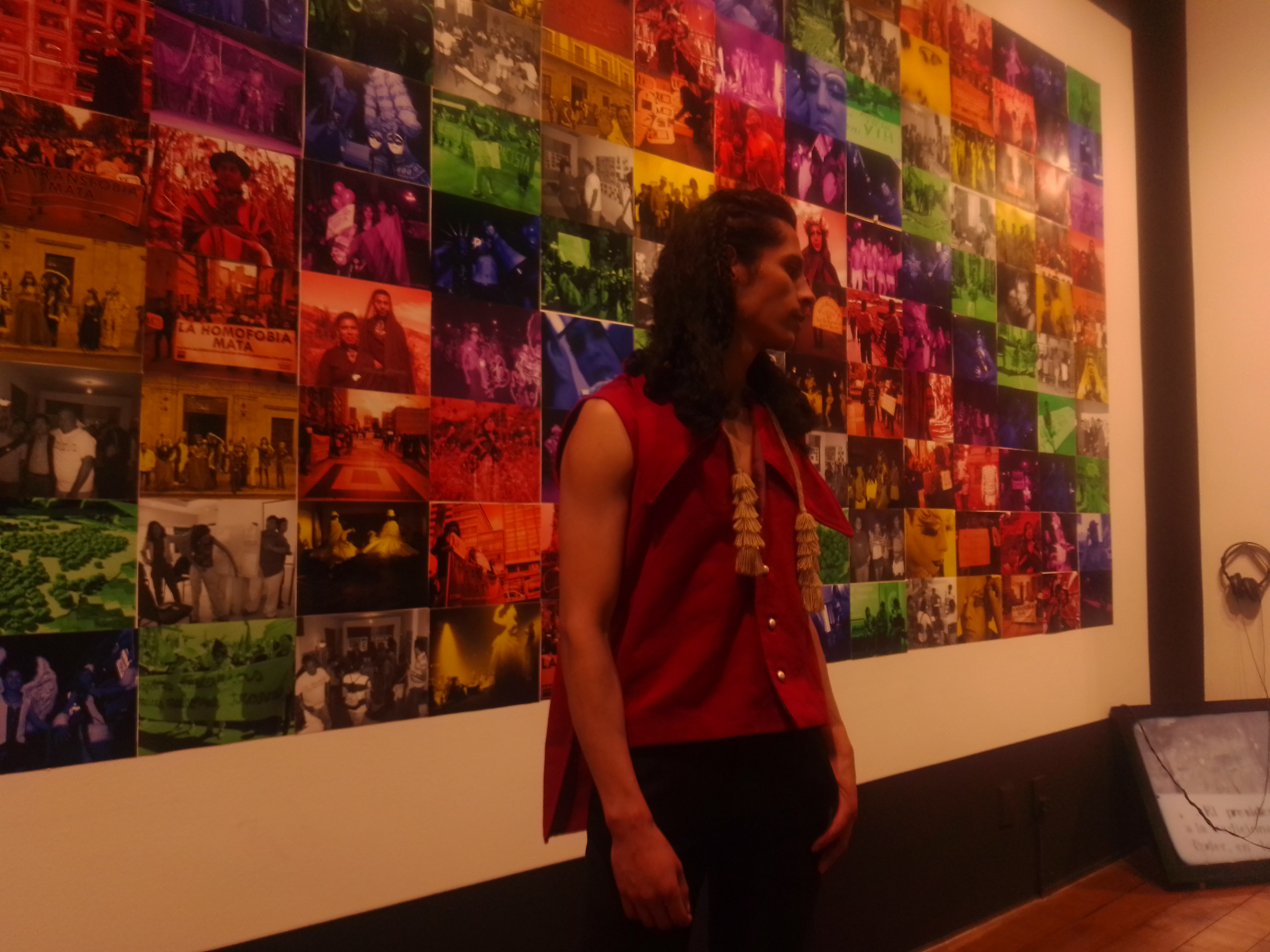
Model at the Fiesta Marica exposition during Festival Cuir, 2025

Regarding poetry, notable poets include Édgar Soliz, author of Sarcoma (2018), and Flavia Lima, the 2017 winner of the Yolanda Bedregal National Poetry Award. Since 2018, Bolivia has been home to the Festival de Poesía Sudaka Marica-Machorra-Trava-Cuir, which gathers writers from across Latin America to present and discuss LGBT works.

== Music ==
One of the major pioneers of Bolivian LGBT music was the openly gay folk singer Gerardo Rosas, who started his career singing and dancing at chicha bars in Sucre in the mid-20th century, in a style that became known as "zapateo chuquisaqueño." Towards the end of the 1960s, he reached enough fame to record three albums with the Capital record label, additionally he became a well known figure on folk music radio stations. Other popular LGBT musicians of the 20th century were Jaime del Río, author of the popular cueca "Mi pena," and the Chinas Morenas, the name given to transvestite gay men who danced in glamorous costumes during folk festivals, such as the Carnaval de Oruro and the Fiesta del Gran Poder.

In 2018, the singer Luis Gamarra, student of the Berklee College of Music and contestant in the reality television competition show American Idol, publicly announced his homosexuality.

== Radio and television ==
The first LGBT radio program in Bolivia was created in 2004 by the Galán Family and was transmitted until 2007 on Radio Wayna Tambo, in El Alto. In 2010, Radio Deseo premiered the program Soy marica, y qué, which consisted of six broadcasts that covered various topics relating to sexual diversity. The same group that created Soy marica, y qué also created the program Nación Marica a few years later, which was transmitted by Radio Líder and followed a format of LGBT news, music, and interviews. Another LGBT radio program was Escenarios Trans, released in 2015 on Radio Wayna Tambo and had the objective of positioning itself as a representative of the social demands of LGBT groups.

In regards to television, in 2012 Bolivia TV premiered the program Transformando, which was considered the first LGBT national television program and was led by activists París Galán and David Aruquipa.

== Drag culture ==
Cross-dressing and drag queen culture has roots in marginalized cultures and subcultures of large cities, especially LGBTQ+ communities. The involvement of drag queens and cross-dressers in Bolivia has a prominent place in cultural events like game shows, parades, festivals, art exhibits, and photography, like at pride celebrations in Bolivia.

In Bolivia, cross-dressing has been a part of popular culture since precolonial times, influenced by various forms of art and theater including carnivals. Regardless, cross-dressing culture and drag queens have faced discrimination for many years, having been considered a marginal phenomenon. In the 1960s and 1970s, the figure of the China Morena first appeared. The China Morena is a provocative character performed by homosexuals. This character has been labeled a trailblazer for transgender participation in popular dances. The inspiration for the China Morena is credited to La Negrita, a character created by Carlos Espinoza, also known as Ofelia or the Great Ofelia, who inspired the aesthetic of the stars of the era. Regarding the history of the aesthetics of the China Morena, LGBT journalist and activist, David Aruquipa said:

Entonces las medias de red, las botas largas hasta los muslos, los corsés, las mangas anchas tipo mariposa, los cancanes, los volados, las pelucas y los peinados bombé, los canelones y el maquillaje fuerte y profundo no sólo ocultaron la masculinidad biológica sino y sobre todo fueron los materiales para transformarse en un personaje único, bello y seductor. De este modo, el estilismo fue el instrumento que revolucionó y creó a este personaje que se llamaría desde entonces la China Morena.

So the fishnet stockings, the big thigh-high boots, the corsets, the wide butterfly sleeves, the petticoats, the ruffles, the wigs and beehives, the corkscrew curls, and the heavy and intense makeup were not only ways to conceal masculine biology but all were also material ways to transform into a unique, beautiful, and seductive person. In this way, the styling was instrumental in revolutionizing and making this character who was named the China Morena from then on.

— David Aruquipa Pérez, La China Morena. Memoria histórica travesti

In 1975, the tradition of the China Morena was banned under the military dictatorship of Hugo Banzer Suárez, but it later reappeared.

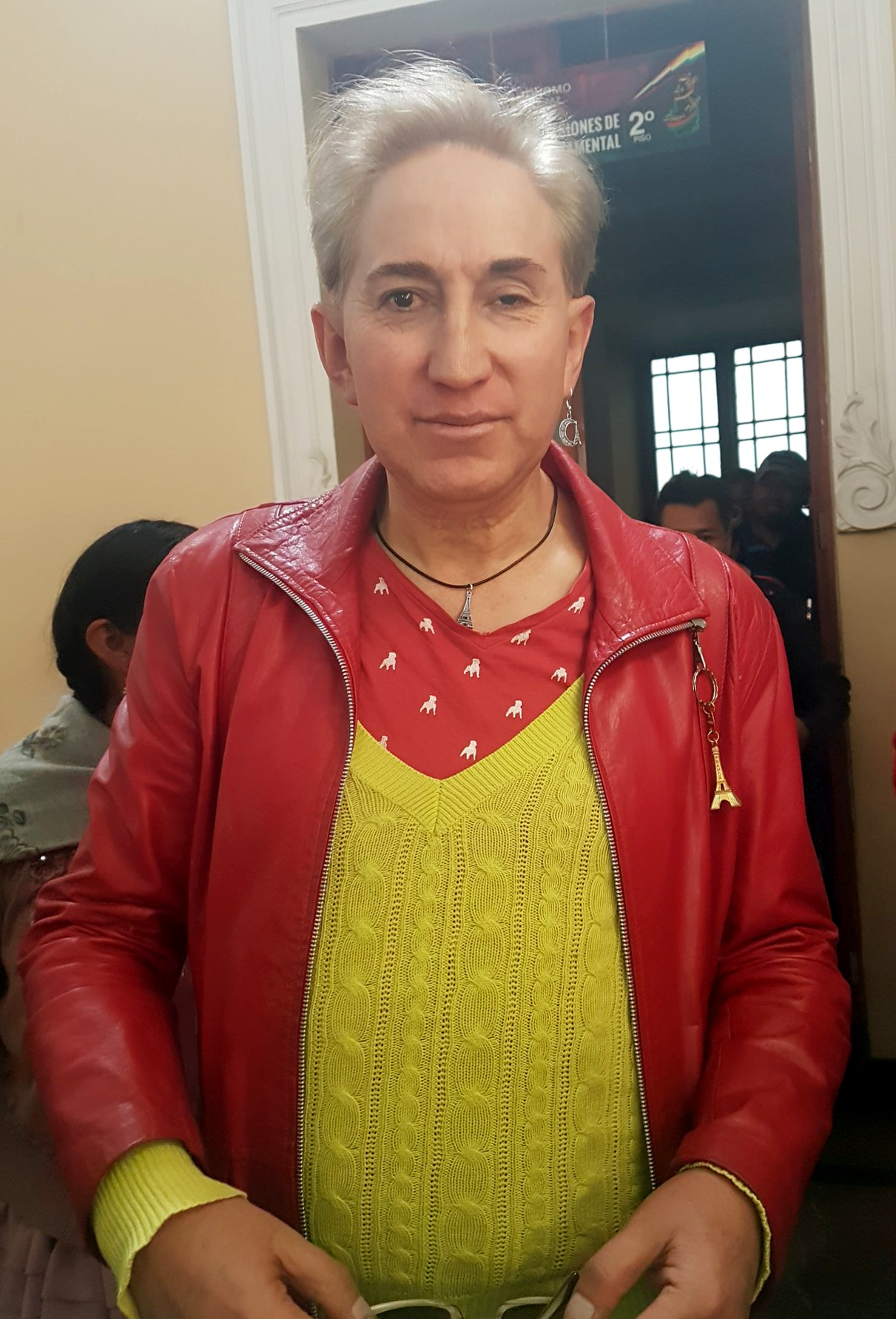
LGBT activist and trailblazing drag queen, París Galán in 2019

Since the 1990s, there has been growing acceptance and visibility of the cross-dressing and drag communities in Bolivia. These years coincided with the appearance of the Galán Family, which was an important force in the fight for acceptance and recognition of cross-dressing culture and drag queens in Bolivia. The Galán Family is described as "an aesthetic revolution" for their impact on the art and society of Bolivia. Their art and performances have been critically acclaimed and attract a diverse audience. Additionally, they have created a platform for dialogue and reflection about topics of gender and diversity in Bolivia, challenging traditionally held gender stereotypes.

Among the most well known members of the Galán Family are David Aruquipa, París Galán and Andrés Mallo, who are considered pioneers of the drag queen scene in the country. David Aruquipa is a Bolivian cross-dressing activist and performer known for his work as the leader of the Galán Family. París Galán is a Bolivian drag queen known for her impact on the cross-dressing scene in Bolivia and for her participation in numerous parades and events in Bolivia and abroad.

In 2022, La Paz was the headquarters of the first Gala Drag Queen Bolivia, an event that reflects the growing interest in and acceptance of cross-dressing culture and drag queen in the country.

== See also ==
- LGBTQ rights in Bolivia
- Culture of Bolivia

== Bibliography ==
- Foster, David William; Nelson, Emmanuel S. (1994). Latin American writers on gay and lesbian themes: a bio-critical sourcebook. Greenwood Press. ISBN 978-0-313-36874-5. OCLC 650307526.
