= La Paz Pride =

Annual LGBTQ event in La Paz, Bolivia

La Paz Pride Marcha de las Diversidades Sexuales y de Género de La Paz
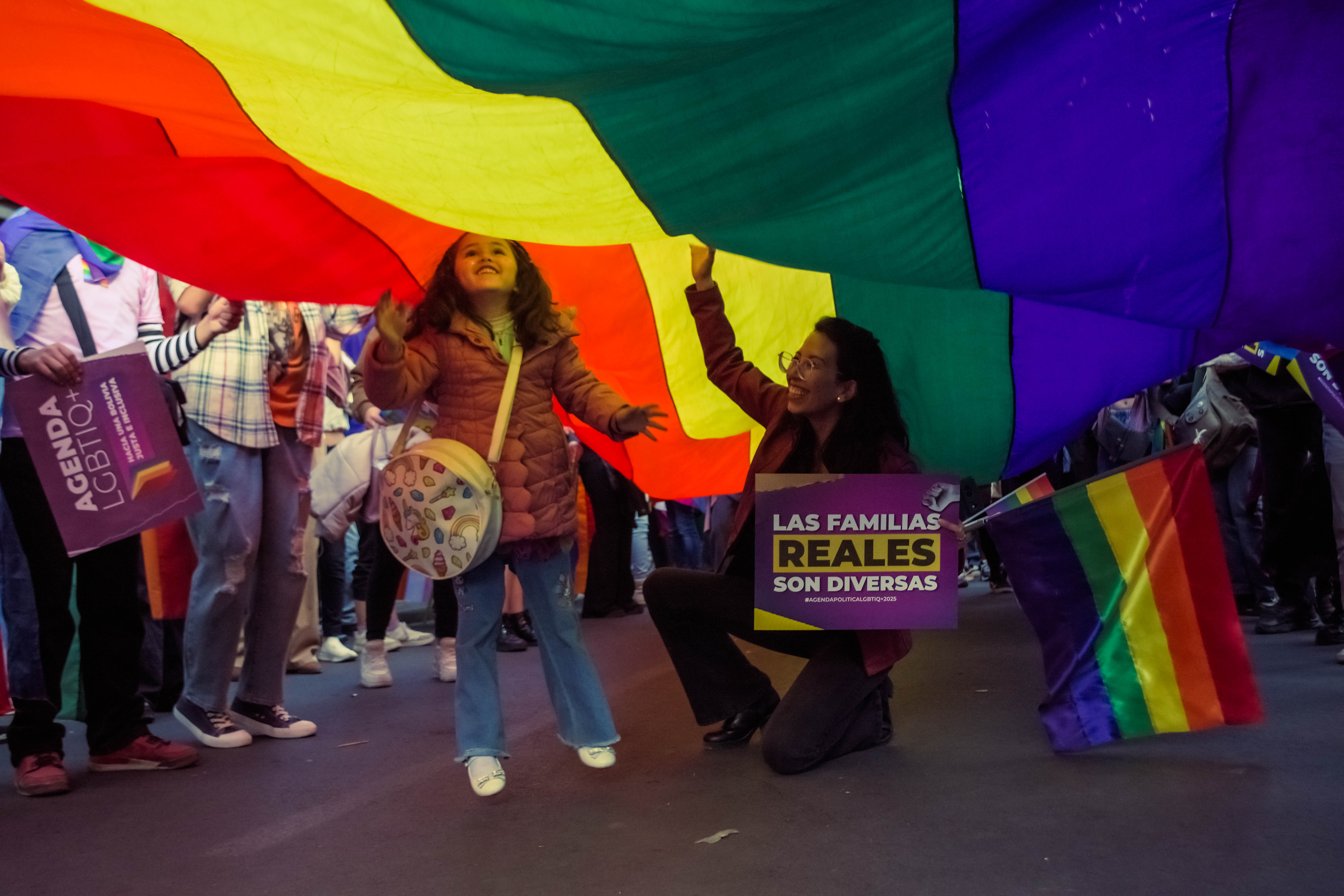
- Genre: Pride parade
- Date: Week of June 28th
- Frequency: Annually
- Locations: La Paz, Bolivia

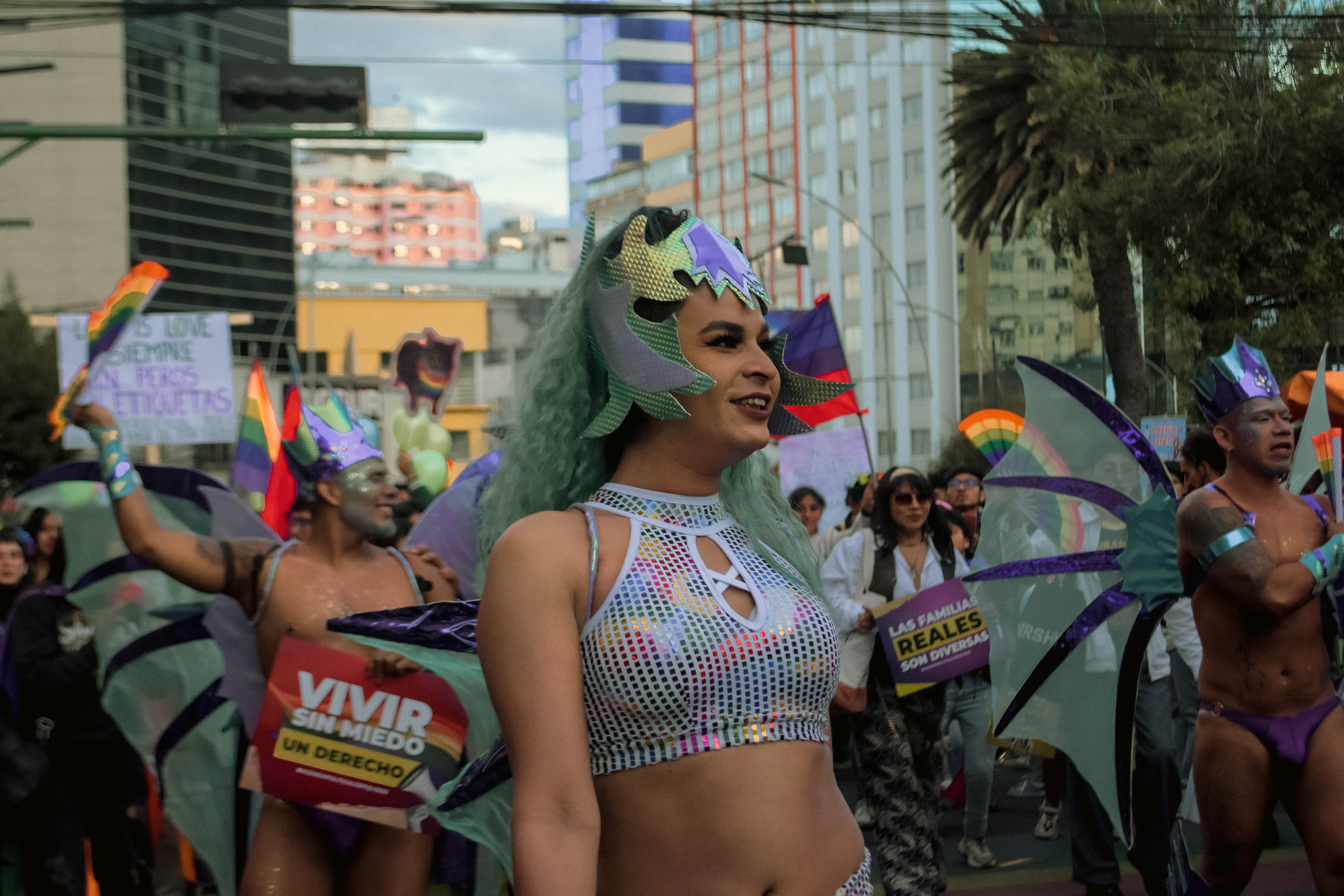
2025 La Paz Pride

La Paz Pride, also known as the March of Diverse Sexualities and Genders of La Paz, is a pride parade that is held annually in La Paz, Bolivia to commemorate International LGBT Pride Day. The march occurs every year in the Paseo del Prado section of the city. During the march attendees wear colorful clothing, have rainbow flags, and carry signs with protest messages. There are frequently floats, baterias, and people dancing.

The parade first started in 2003 and, in its early years, it was common for many participants to wear masks to hide their identities. The demonstration's name was changed to the March of Diverse Genders and Sexualities by activists because the former name of Gay Pride Parade was considered exclusionary of other LGBT identities. Over time, the event has grown from 100 attendees during the first year to more than 10,000 people in the 2020s.

The event is considered by local media to be the largest pride parade in the country. Over the years, it has received support from the mayors of La Paz including Juan del Granado, Luis Revilla, and Iván Arias all of whom participated in the procession.

== Background ==
Before the first pride march, ADESPROC Libertad organized various activities to commemorate International LGBT Pride Day during the week of June 28.

In 1994, CISTAC (the Center for Social Research, Appropriate Technology, and Training) and Mujeres Creando spearheaded the first attempt to hold a march on June 28. In addition to the activists from the city, the event received a delegation of almost 10 LGBT people from Cochabamba, including Javier Ojalvo. Nevertheless, when the attendees had walked less than half a block, the police arrived and threw tear gas against the demonstration to break it up.

== Pride Parade ==
=== First years (2003-2007) ===
The first pride parade in La Paz took place in June 2003, and was organized by Adesproc Libertad. Because many LGBT people did not want to identify themselves publicly, members of Mujeres Creando suggested strategies such as painting the faces of attendees to maintain anonymity. The march was called "Masks Against Prejudice and Preconceptions" and went from Avenida Mariscal Santa Cruz to the end of Paseo del Prado. Altogether, the event had close to 100 attendees, some of whom wore masks. Unlike the first Santa Cruz de la Sierra Pride, which three years before had experienced targeted attacks by conservative groups, the parade in La Paz was not the target of violence.

The next year, various attendees returned to using masks to protect their identities. The number of participants in this year increased from 100 in 2003 to 300 in 2004. The march also received greater support from the general public.

In 2005, the event began to be known as the March of Diverse Sexualities and Genders, at the behest of the Rainbow Movement (Movimiento del Arcoíris), which was formed by Friends without Borders (Amigos Sin Fronteras), Symbiosis (Simbiosis), the Galan Family (Familia Galán), the Feminist Assembly (Asamblea Feminista), and more groups of travesti individuals. According to the Rainbow Movement, the former name of Gay Pride March excluded the rest of the LGBT identities and the march was more of a parade than a demonstration with clear political character. Due to their criticisms, from 2005 onward, the march took on more protest characteristics. However, although this year's march had popular support, an incident occurred afterwards when a tear gas canister fell near the stage where the closing artistic event of the march was taking place.

Besides the march organized by the Rainbow Movement in 2005, La Paz hosted the Fourth National LGBT Congress a few days later. As part of this, Adesproc Libertad held a national pride march where Congress participants from various departments participated.

The 2007 march, which took place on June 30, is remembered for a homophobic attack which occurred where unidentified individuals threw a molotov cocktail from a car at a float at Federico Suazo street. As a result of this attack, six people were injured, including the director of Adesproc Libertad, Alberto Moscoso. The organizers reported the incident to the ombudsman but neither the police nor the public prosecutor initiated relevant investigations to find those responsible.

=== Marches after the approval of Ordinance 249-08 (2008-2019) ===
During the first days of June 2008, La Paz Municipality approved Ordinance 249/2008, which among other points officially established June 28 as the "Day of Non-Discrimination Against Diverse Sexualities and/or Genders in the Municipality of La Paz." This had an immediate effect on the march and the city's mayor, Juan del Granado, led that year's procession. The demonstration had 600 participants and started at Plaza Isabel la Católica and continued the entire length of Paseo del Prado.

In 2011, during the ninth year of the event, the mayor's office officially named it the March of Diversities (Marcha de las Diversidades). The next year, the procession was once again led by the mayor, this year Luis Revilla. Among the demands of this year's attendees was legal recognition of same sex couples, a demand which was repeated in following years. In 2013, the march started in the Plaza del Estudiante, proceeded along avenues 16 de julio and Mariscal Santa Cruz, ultimately ending at the Plaza Mayor.

The municipal government continued helping the march during the following years. In 2016 and 2017, Mayor Revilla returned to lead it. The 2016 march started at El Prado Fountain and ended at Plaza Camacho with a musical performance.

In 2018, the march took place on June 30 and had three stages. The first stage was located at Arce Avenue, near Bolivia Plaza, and was where Mayor Revilla gave a small speech to the attendees. The second stage was in Venezuela Plaza and had government authorities and activists. The third and final stage was in the Plaza Mayor and included cultural demonstrations including poetry reading and a drag show. Altogether, more than fifty organizations participated in this year's festivities.

The following year, in 2019, the parade took place on June 29. It started in the Plaza del Estudiante and went until the Mercado Camacho.

=== Present day (2020 onward) ===
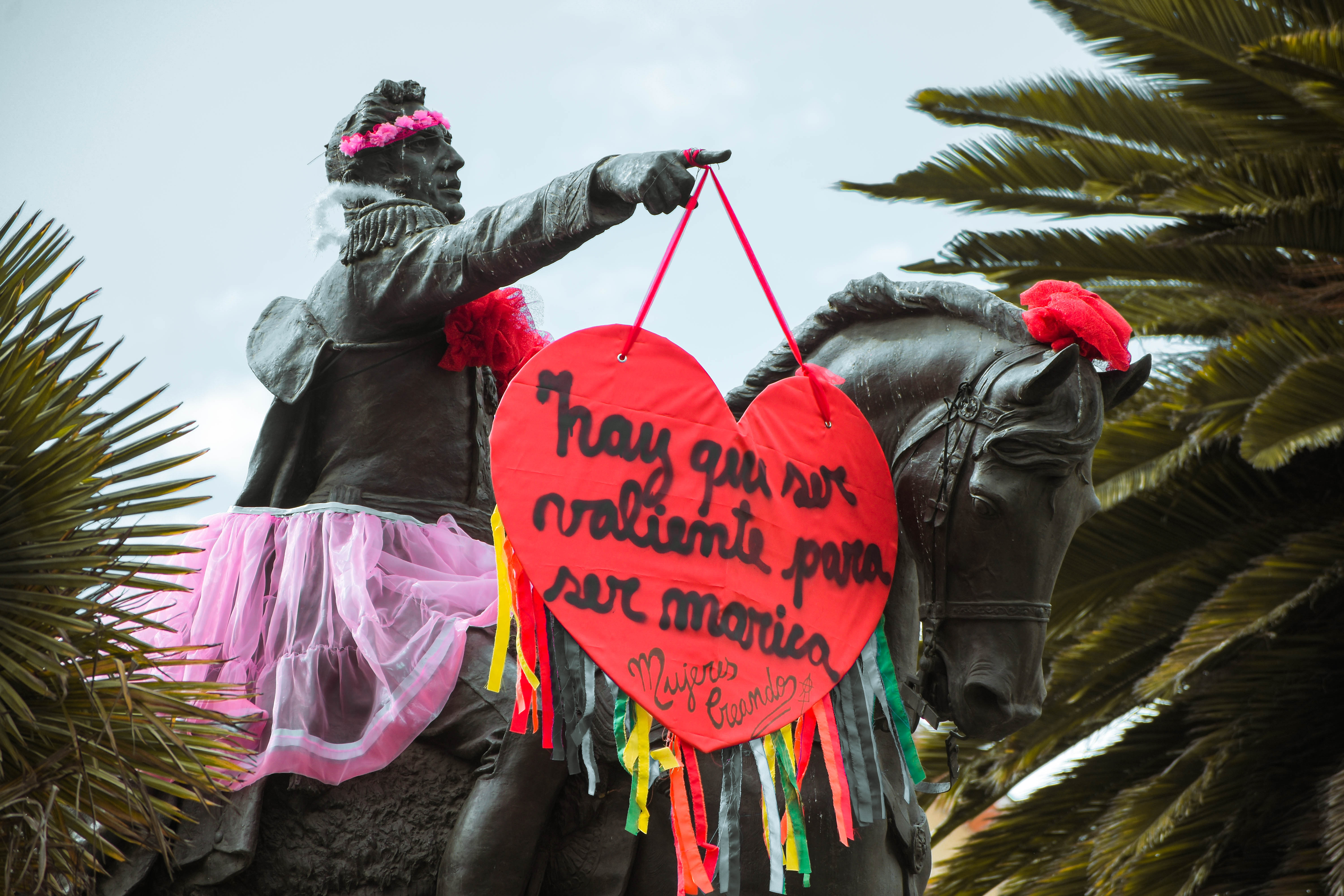
Statue of Antonio José de Sucre in the Plaza del Estudiante decorated for the 2025 pride parade. The signs he is holding says "You have to be brave to be gay."

In 2020 and 2021, the march was canceled due to the COVID-19 pandemic and in its place were virtual events. It was once again celebrated in person in 2022, with an estimated participation of 10,000 people. Like in 2019, the march started in the Plaza del Estudiante, proceeded along the Obelisco, and ended in the Mercado Camacho. Among the authorities that assisted in the demonstration was the mayor of the city, Iván Arias. This year also included a memorial for the activist Pamela Valenzuela, who died the year before from COVID-19.

The 2024 march was led by the activist David Aruquipa and his partner, Guido Montaño, who were the first same-sex couple to have their domestic partnership recognized by the state. The march also included Mayor Arias, who thanked the city for their respect, as well as numerous floats and baterias. Like in previous years, the parade started in the Plaza del Estudiantes, went along the Paseo del Prado until the Obelisco, continued onto Camacho Avenue, and ended at Simón Bolívar Avenue. At the end of the parade at Simón Bolívar Avenue, there was a stage set up for an arts festival called Diversifest. Additionally, for this year, the mayoral office decorated various buildings with colors of the rainbow and made a rainbow flag in Plaza Venezuela.

Mayor Arias led the 2025 march, which included delegations from several embassies, including the ambassadors of Germany and Sweden as well as representatives of the European Union. During his speech, which he gave on the stage set up on Camacho street, the mayor celebrated the city for its tolerance and for embracing the message of love given by the event. However, he also lamented that days before a sign in favor of respect for sexual diversity was vandalized with black paint.

== See also ==
- Pride celebrations in Bolivia
- Santa Cruz de la Sierra Pride
- LGBT rights in Bolivia
- Mujeres Creando
