= Cherry's Bar police raid =

Police raid against a LGBT business in Bolivia in 1995

- Date: June 3, 1995
- Location: La Paz, Bolivia
- Type: Police raid
- Motive: Homophobia from local police

The Cherry's Bar police raid was a police raid that took place on the night of June 3, 1995, at a nightclub for LGBT people in La Paz, Bolivia. During the raid, the police violently entered Cherry's Bar and arbitrarily detained around 120 people who were later mistreated and photographed by the press. This act is considered one of the events that marked the beginning of the LGBTQ movement in La Paz and increased awareness of sexual minorities at a national level.

== Night of June 3rd, 1995 ==
Cherry's Bar was an LGBT nightclub on Loayza Street that had been opened by a former employee of Bolivianísimo, another LGBT bar at the same time. The night of June 3, 1995, was a celebration of the opening of Cherry's bar and because of this the bar was packed.

According to the testimonies of people attending the event, two unknown people showed up during the celebrations. This was unusual as almost everyone there knew each other. The two unknown people later left and a little while after that, police violently entered the bar with a prosecutor who announced that everybody in the establishment was being arrested. Those in attendance were then taken out of the bar, among them a drag performer who was mistreated and insulted by the police officers.

Outside of the bar, the officers had the people being detained form a line to wait to be taken to the police station. The press arrived and began filming and photographing despite protests. When the police cars came, those being detained were sent to different precincts, where many were humiliated and made to strip before being put into cells. The majority of the arrested were taken to Radio Patrullas 110 on Arce Avenue, where they were able to contact human rights organizations and tell them about the incident. Altogether, 123 people were detained during the operation.

== Resulting events ==
Since the police didn't provide any legal justification for the arrests, the arrested were released the following afternoon after signing a document that stated they accepted the arrest and corroborated the false statement that it had occurred as part of a drug raid. During the following days, the press published stories about what happened, calling it "the largest raid against homosexuals in the history of Bolivia".

The news surrounding the raid created a social scandal that reached many of the families of those arrested, outing them in the process. As a result, the event led to a decrease in the number of people who wanted to participate in LGBT activism groups in La Paz, particularly the Gay La Paz Movement-Freedom, which in those days was preparing to assemble its first board of directors.

However, the event also increased the number of LGBT people aware of the necessity of visibility and demanding respect for their rights. Because of this, the raid has been labeled one of the triggers of LGBT activism in La Paz and Bolivia and credited with increasing the visibility of queer individuals in Bolivia.

== See also ==
- LGBT rights in Bolivia
- La Paz Pride

== External sources ==
- Aruquipa, David; Estenssoro, Paula; Vargas, Pablo (2012). Memorias Colectivas Miradas a la Historia del Movimiento TLGB de Bolivia [Collective Memories: Looks at the History of the LGBT Movement in Bolivia] (PDF) (in Spanish). Conexión Fondo de Emancipación. Archived from the original (PDF) on 2019-10-29.
