= Los inocentes (book) =

1961 short story collection by Oswaldo Reynoso

- Author: Oswaldo Reynoso
- Language: Spanish
- Genre: Literary realism
- Publication date: 1961
- Publication place: Peru

Los inocentes (English: The Innocents), also known as Lima en rock, is a collection of short stories by Peruvian writer Oswaldo Reynoso, published in 1961.

== Background and history ==
After publishing the poem Luzbel in 1955, Oswaldo Reynoso started focused on writing a series of short stories based on urban realism and teenage and youth based in Lima. He wrote these collection of short stories, titled as Los inocentes (The innocents) over a five month period between June and October 1960 in Chosica. In 1961, he presented the stories at the Palermo bar in Central Lima. After its successful reception, the book was released under the name of Lima en rock (Lima in rock).

== Critical reception ==
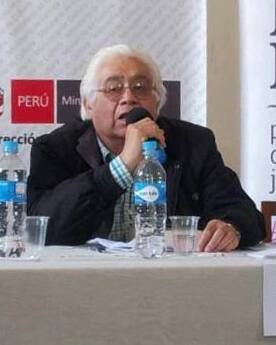
Oswaldo Reynoso in 2012

The stories were based on the youth and the problems faced by them during their adolescence, encompassing various topics such as their psychological crisis, social maladjustment, and economic difficulties. It is one of the earliest Peruvian literature to incorporate the language and jargon of the young people in the urban areas. As per TV Perú, It is not a mere record of words, and it penetrates deep into the thoughts of adolescents, and keeps the audience continually engrossed. It also highlighted the richness of characterization of the personalities of its protagonists and the prose.

However, the book elicited criticism from a section of the press, with Reynoso being even called a pornographer. Literary criticism included negative comments on the language used and the description of the youth on the streets, and their sexual orientation, with some of them branding it as disgusting and a low level piece of literature.

Contrary to conservative opinions, writer and anthropologist José María Arguedas praised the book and its author, stating that "[Reynoso is] a narrator for the new world". while writer Martín Adán told that thanks to this book, the life of Reynoso is set to become a martyrdom.

== Adaptations ==
The episode, El Príncipe, of the 1978 series Cuentos inmorales, directed by Pili Flores Guerra included parts of the book. Los inocentes. Relatos de collera was a 2018 play directed by Sammy Zamalloa, which was inspired by Reynoso's book. Los inocentes, a 2025 film directed by Germán Tejada was based on the book.

== See also ==
- Erebo
- Larilleros (novel)
- Mandibula (novel)
- The Witch King (novel)
