= Bolivia National Pride March =

Annual LGBTQ event in Bolivia

- Native name: Marcha Nacional del Orgullo LGBT de Bolivia
- Date: July
- Location: Bolivia
- Type: Pride festival
- Motive: International LGBT Pride Day, 28 June

The Bolivia National Pride March is a pride march held annually in commemoration of International LGBT Pride Day. The event is held at a different venue in various cities in Bolivia each year, as a way to strengthen the foundations of local LGBT organizations. During the march, LGBTQ people often roam the streets of the host city carrying pride flags and wearing colorful costumes.

The National March is organized by the TLGB Bolivia collective. The first edition of the event took place in the city of Cochabamba in 2013. The event is usually held in the week following 28 June, the date on which the International LGBT Pride Day is celebrated. Several pride marches are held annually across different departments of Bolivia; however, unlike these, the National March receives delegations from all nine departments of the country.

== History ==
Bolivia's first National LGBT Pride March took place in the city of Cochabamba in 2013. The following year, the event took place on 5 July in the city of Sucre. This march began at Estadio Patria and advanced towards the administrative building of the government of Chuquisaca located at Plaza 25 de Mayo, where a platform had been installed. It was attended by representatives from the Ombudsman's Office, the Deputy Minister of Decolonization, President of the National Committee against Racism and Discrimination, and LGBTQ activists including Ronald Céspedes, Claudette Rojas, David Aruquipa, Alex Bernabe, Paris Galan, and Sasette. The 2015 edition took place in La Paz.

The 2016 edition took place on 9 July in Tarija. The march began at Bolívar Park, proceeded through the Plaza Luis de Fuentes and ended in Plaza Sucre. It was led by the Bolivian Ombudsman, David Tezanos Pinto, and took place in Tarija as a form of support for LGBT activists in the city. The 2017 march took place on 8 July in El Alto. It started at Tinku Square, and proceeded via the Satellite and Civic Avenues before ending at Obelisk Square. The 2019 event took place in Trinidad.

The National March was cancelled in 2020 and 2021 due to the COVID-19 pandemic. The 2022 event was held on 9 July at the city of Oruro, and featured about a thousand participants and twenty thousand spectators.

The 2023 edition took place on 22 July in El Alto. The march began at a station on the Línea Amarilla (Yellow Line) of Mi Teleferico (My Cable Car), then passed through Plaza del Obelisco, and Antofagasta Avenue before ending at Plaza Juana Azurduy in Padilla. The following year, the march took place in Cobija. Due to Cobija's proximity to Brazil, delegations from the Brazilian towns of Brasileia and Epitaciolandia joined the march.

== Editions ==
Year	City	Date	Ref.
2013	Cochabamba		
2014	Sucre	5 July	
2015	La Paz		
2016	Tarija	9 July	
2017	El Alto	8 July	
2018			
2019	Trinidad	6 July	
2020	Suspended		
2021	Suspended		
2022	Oruro	9 July	
2023	El Alto	22 July	
2024	Cobija	13 July	
