= Julieta Paredes =

Bolivian feminist activist

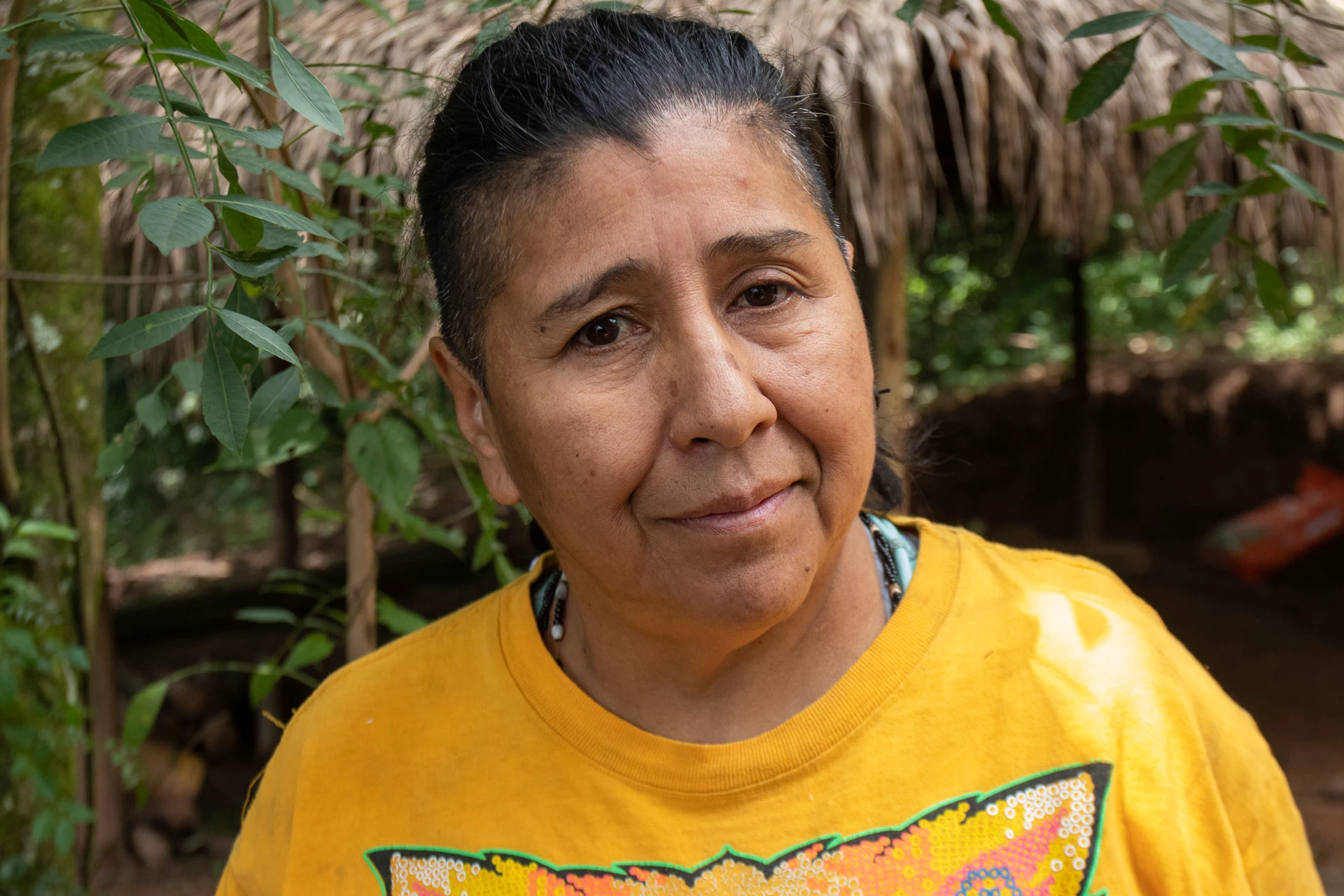
- Portrait of Paredes, taken during an interview with Agência Pública, 2020
- Born: Julieta Paredes Carvajal c. 1967 (age 58–59); La Paz, Republic of Bolivia
- Occupations: Poet, writer

Julieta Paredes Carvajal (born c. 1967) is an Aymara Bolivian poet, singer-songwriter, writer, graffiti artist, anarchist and decolonial feminist activist. In 2003, she began Mujeres creando comunidad (transl. women creating community) out of the activism of community feminism.

== Career ==
Julieta Paredes was born in the city of La Paz. In 1992, she and her then-partner María Galindo founded the Mujeres Creando movement. Her relationship with Galindo ended in 1998, and in 2002 there was a division of the organization. In 2003, she initiated the so-called Mujeres creando comunidad, because, as she explained in 2008, "Autonomous and Anarchist feminism was no longer enough."

With great patience since April 2002, we were building relationships with women from the neighborhoods and also from El Alto. The year 2003 when the insurrection occurred, we found these women in the streets fighting against neoliberalism and for the recovery of natural resources for our people. There the compatriots realized that our feminism was not a show for TV, nor for export, that in reality we were feminists for our people, from our town. From that time, we continued meeting at the "Carcajada" café and the Feminist Assembly was born, which is a coordination of various loose collectives and feminists.

— Julieta Paredes, 2008

Julieta Paredes Carvajal is the author of the book Hilando fino desde el feminismo comunitario (2008), in which she delves into notions such as equality between women and men in the context of indigenous culture, her position on Western feminism, colonialism, and neoliberalism, and the role of the body and sexuality in the liberation of women. She defines herself as an "Aymara feminist lesbian".

== Community feminism ==
Paredes is part of a movement called "community feminism", based on the participation of women and men in a community without a hierarchical relationship between the groups, but with both having an equivalent level of political representation. This conception of feminism, Paredes says, moves away from the individualism characteristic of contemporary society.

Community feminism questions patriarchy, not only colonial but also the patriarchy that derives from one's own cultures and that has also marked a double standard for women. In this sense, they reproach Indianism for not recognizing the existence of oppression of women, and distancing itself from the view of essentialism also in relation to the Indian population. "The people are liberating us. They are historical political processes. I come from a people," she said in one of her interventions in Mexico in 2016. "It is not a wonder what Brother Morales is doing, but it is the best thing we have right now in history, of our town, and we are building." From no government are revolutions made, says Paredes; that is why we are in the process of change with social movements.

"Blanquitas, blancos, for us, are not the people who have fair skin, but those who accept the privileges of a patriarchal, colonial, and racist system because of the clarity of skin, in the same way with our male brothers, it is not for being men but for accepting the privileges that a patriarchal, colonial, racist system gives them; they use it and do not fight it." Therefore, the structure that arises is "from the long memory of the people."

== See also ==
- Lesbofeminism
- José Manuel Canelas Jaime
