= Ninon Vidangos =

Bolivian lawyer

- Born: Victor Hugo Vidangos Ortega
- Occupations: lawyer, stylist, LGBT rights activist
- Awards: National champion of cutting, colouring and styling (2011)

Victor Hugo Vidangos Ortega, more often known as Ninon Vidangos, is a lawyer, stylist, and LGBT rights activist. He is best known for providing legal support for the LGBT community and their families for hate crimes.

== Early life ==
Vidangos began being called "Ninon" during his adolescence, when studying dramatic arts in the National Theatre workshop in La Paz, under the guidance of playwright Ninón Dávalos. Vidangos recalls that he admired his tutor and began to imitate her. After that, he began adopting the nickname "Ninon."

== Career ==
As an activist and lawyer, Vidangos became known for supporting victims of hate crimes, especially those committed against trans women.

He was a friend of Dayana Kenia Zárate Bustamante as well as the lawyer in her case after her murder in 2016. She was a trans woman who was murdered by her boyfriend. The conviction marked a milestone, as it was the first time in Bolivia that a transfemicide was punished with the maximum sentence of 30 years

== Personal life ==
Vidangos is openly gay. In 2004, he ran for mayor in Santa Cruz. In 2019, he was the candidate for the deputy national of the Movimiento Al Socialismo (Movement for Socialism).

== Recognition ==
On the 28th of June 2022, the Plurinational Cultural Centre, which is a part of the Cultural Foundation of the Central Bank of Bolivia, or the Fundación Cultural del Banco Central de Bolivia (FCBCB) in Spanish. The foundation organised a tribute in his honour. At the tribute, he was quoted as saying, "I have suffered discrimination for being a migrant, homosexual, and poor.

He was the national champion of cutting, colouring, and styling in 2011.

== See also ==
- Pamela Valenzuela
- Murder of Dayana Kenia Zárate Bustamante
