= Murder of Dayana Kenia Zárate Bustamante =

2016 murder of a trans woman in Bolivia

The murder of Dayana Kenia Zárate Bustamante was a crime that took place on 1 April 2016 in Santa Cruz de la Sierra, Bolivia, in which Dayana Kenia Zárate Bustamante, a Bolivian trans woman and entrepreneur, was tortured and murdered by her partner in order to steal her savings. In November 2017, the main perpetrator was sentenced to 30 years in prison without the possibility of pardon, the maximum penalty under Bolivian law. The case is noteworthy as it was the first murder of a trans person in Bolivia that reached trial and resulted in a conviction.

== Background ==
Zárate was born in La Paz in July 1992, into a family with limited financial resources. Around 2013, she moved to Santa Cruz de la Sierra in search of better economic opportunities, intending to support her parents and siblings. In the eastern part of Bolivia, she publicly assumed her identity as a woman; her parents, who resided in the west of the country, were unaware of that part of her life and would only learn of her identity after her death.

In Santa Cruz, she managed to establish a small music and liquor establishment of her own, with which she worked as an entrepreneur. She saved money with the intention of completing her gender transition. There, she became friends with the activist, lawyer, and stylist Ninon Vidangos, who would later take on her case.

== Murder ==
A month before her death, Zárate hired Alex Villca Valdivieso, a native of Potosí, as an employee in her establishment, with whom she soon began a romantic relationship. Villca knew about the 5,000 US dollars she had gathered for her surgery.

On 1 April 2016, Zárate was found dead by a neighbour in the bathroom of her establishment. Her body showed wounds on her hands and feet, multiple cuts, cigarette burns on her face, and her throat had been slit. According to the investigation, she was assaulted with a knife to make her reveal where she kept the money before being murdered. Graciela Salazar Ibáñez was identified as an accomplice, whom Villca had previously introduced to the victim as his sister, although investigations established that she was actually his partner.

== Judicial process ==
Initially, the event was classified as homicide, which generated rejection among the family and the collectives that accompanied the case, who demanded it be treated as murder. The process lasted about a year and a half and went through numerous hearing suspensions. Despite their financial limitations, the victim's parents attended all the hearings in Santa Cruz and reported being mistreated by police officers and prosecutors.

On 24 November 2017, the Sentencing Court No. 12 of Santa Cruz sentenced Álex Villca Valdivieso to 30 years in prison, the maximum penalty in Bolivia, for the murder committed, according to the evidence, with extreme violence. The same court acquitted Graciela Salazar Ibáñez of the complicity charge. The Ministry of Justice of Bolivia followed the case and provided support to the family.

The legal proceedings involved the family, the Mujeres Creando collective, the Ombudsman's Office of Bolivia, various LGBTQ organizations, and lawyer Ninon Vidangos.

== Impact ==
The sentence was the first case of the murder of a transgender person in Bolivia that reached trial and resulted in a conviction, something made possible, according to David Aruquipa, by the perseverance of the victim's family. Hate crimes were not classified in Bolivian legislation, so the event was not processed as such nor as a transfemicide. The draft of the Penal System Code was under debate in the Bolivian Senate around 2017, which would have allowed the consideration of transphobic motives.

As Zárate died before the entry into force of the Gender Identity Law in Bolivia, which allows trans people to modify their name and identity on official documents, she was buried with her registered name. On 1 July 2018, the date on which she would have turned 26, her parents placed a new headstone with her female name and surname, with the support of activist David Aruquipa.
