= María Galindo =

Bolivian activist

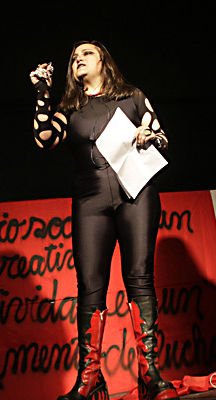
- Galindo in 2014.
- Born: 1964 (age 61–62); Cochabamba, Bolivia
- Occupations: Psychologist, activist, radio and television presenter, screenwriter, author
- Employer: Higher University of San Andrés
- Known for: Co-founder of Mujeres Creando
- Notable work: No se puede Descolonizar sin Despatriarcalizar (2013), Ninguna mujer nace para puta (2007), Archivo Cordero 1900–1961 (2004), Feminismo Bastardo (2022), América (2022)
- Family: José Antonio Galindo Neder (brother)

María Galindo Neder is a Bolivian anarcha-feminist and psychologist. She has worked as a radio presenter and television host. She has written three books and is also a screenwriter.

== Life and career ==
María Galindo Neder was born in 1964 in Cochabamba (another source says La Paz) to an upper-middle-class family. Maria left Bolivia with a visa as a nun to study at a Vatican university. She later returned in 1992.

In 1992, she co-founded Mujeres Creando ("Women Creating"), a Bolivian collective and social movement, with Julieta Paredes and Mónica Mendoza. She broadcasts a regular radio program from Mujeres Creando. For her controversial actions (often labeled as performance art or street theater), she was arrested and assaulted several times by Bolivian police even though her older brother, José Antonio Galindo Neder, was a minister under former president Carlos Mesa. She also champions the rights of women who are victims of abuse and sexual harassment caused by machismo. Galindo, a psychologist, teaches sociology at the Higher University of San Andrés. She states, "The street is the most important political setting. So we took the street and made the graffiti that we continue to make in four cities in the country. She co-founded Mujeres Creando in 1992 as an autonomous, anarcho-feminist collective independent from political parties, churches, NGOs and governments. With graffiti, we try to mix different topics simultaneously." Galindo is an atheist.

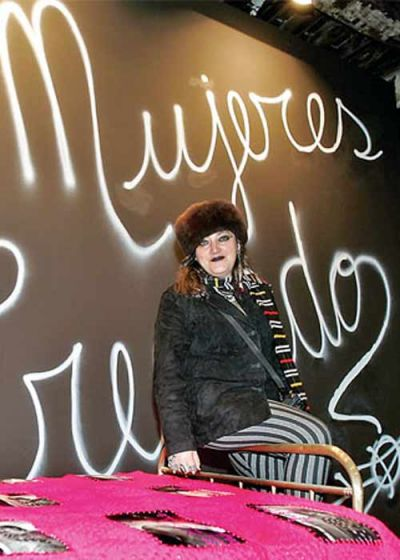
María Galindo

In 2019, Paul B. Preciado wrote about her "Over the past 15 years, Galindo has created a radical artistic practice: an artist, performer, activist, writer and cofounder of the Bolivian collective Mujeres Creando, she brings the subaltern practices and knowledge of indigenous women into dialogue with the political and literary traditions of anarchism, punk and nonwhite feminism. But what can art do in the face of an authoritarian neocolonialism in which the logics of feminism and indigenous identity politics have been absorbed within humanist, religious and neoliberal discourse as new strategies of control? Galindo answers by dislocating art from the spaces of the market and the gallery and bringing it right back to the place where it was born: the public square, the social ritual.Her outspoken style and radical interventions have sometimes attracted critique from other feminist groups for being provocative, which could be noted to maintain a balanced tone. Mujeres Creando’s public actions such as Pasarela Feminista (Feminist Catwalk), staged in the city of Santa Cruz, Bolivia, in 2014, sought to confront the white and heterosexual idealized feminine body, an image perpetuated by mainstream media, via a 13-hour ‘rebellion’ by women in the city's streets in which they gave speeches while walking a makeshift catwalk in outfits that they felt both reclaimed and represented their own bodies and experiences as indigenous women."

In 2022, she wrote “De Ella Feminismo bastardo” in which she develops the idea of illegitimate feminism: “the idea that the social struggle does not produce knowledge, does not produce theory, that it is not a place where knowledge is generated, is a totally vertical and alienating idea”, she explains.

== Selected works ==
- 2013, No se puede Descolonizar sin Despatriarcalizar, ISBN 97899954-2-622-4
- 2007, Ninguna mujer nace para puta (with Sonia Sánchez), ISBN 978-987-21900-3-3
- 2004, Archivo Cordero 1900–1961
- 2022, Feminismo Bastardo
- 2022, América: art work made by three audiovisual pieces and a graffiti. Reina Sofía Museum, Madrid.
