= Pride celebrations in Bolivia =

LGBTQ events in Bolivia

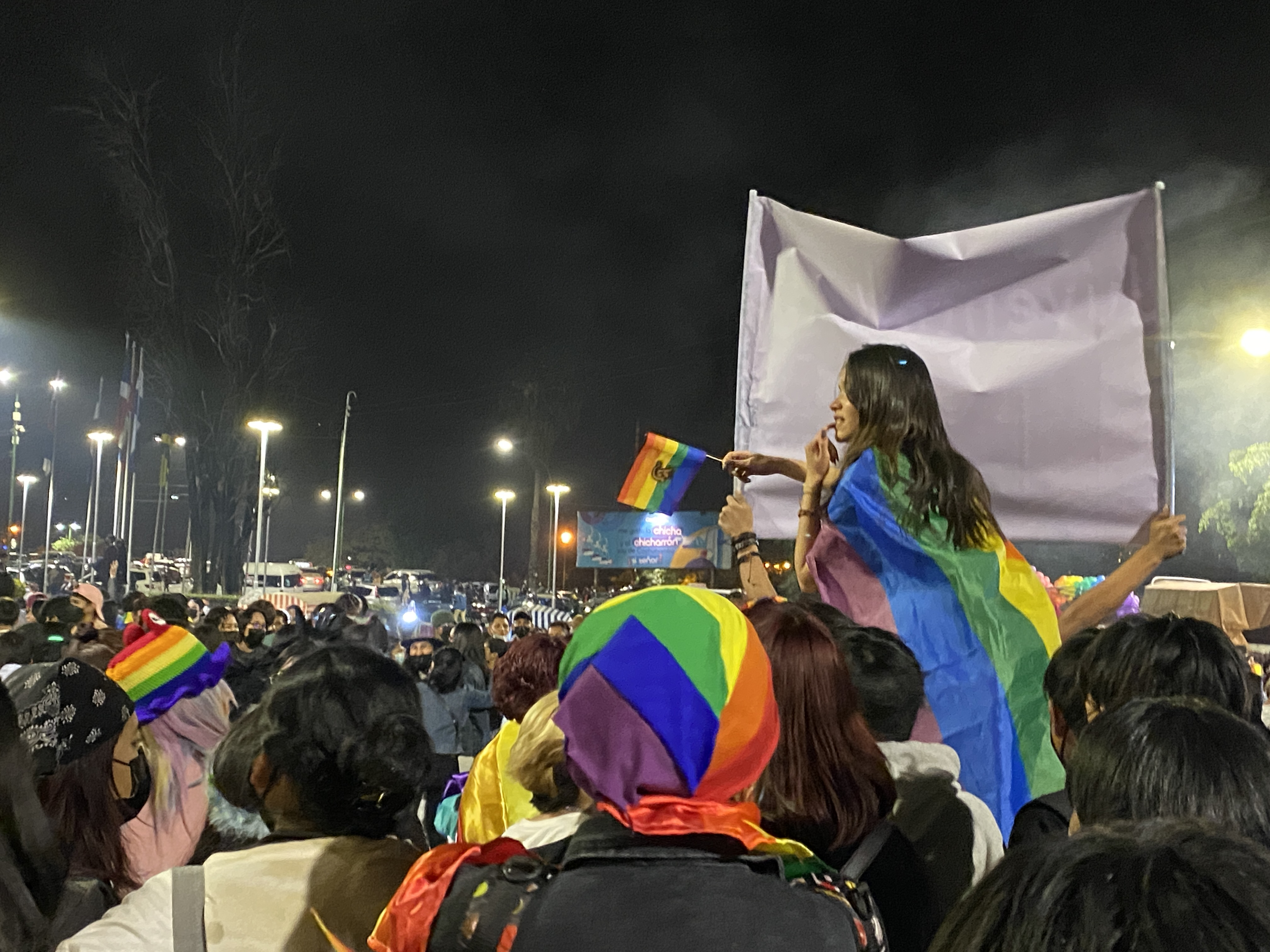
Pride parade in Cochabamba in 2022

Pride celebrations occur across Bolivia to commemorate International LGBT Pride Day, with a series of events, festivals, and marches that seek to vindicate sexual diversity, the rights of LGBT people, and their human respect. The first LGBT Pride March in Bolivia was held in the city of Santa Cruz in 2000 and since then it has become an annual tradition in several cities of the country. In addition to the mobilization, recreational and cultural activities are also carried out.

Over the years, pride parades in Bolivia have faced many challenges and have been the subject of controversy. They have been criticized by conservative groups and have been the target of attacks and threats of violence by some individuals and groups. However, the pride celebrations have been an opportunity for the LGBT community in Bolivia to get together and celebrate their diversity and pride.

== History ==
The march was held for the first time in 2000 in the city of Santa Cruz. The chosen date was June 27, the day before the International LGBT Pride Day, which commemorates the violent police intervention at the Stonewall Inn bar in New York and the beginning of the modern struggle for LGBT rights. During this first pride march, acts of violence occurred; namely, a person threw a tear gas bomb at the attendees while a group of people chased transgender demonstrators to attack them.

In 2002, Pride celebrations were held in the city of La Paz for the first time. During the marches in La Paz in 2003 and 2004, due to the fear of publicly showing their sexual identities, many of the attendees wore masks to conceal their identities. At the 2007 march in La Paz, a Molotov bomb exploded, leaving several people injured.

In 2005, the "Rainbow Movement" was created, an organic alliance that raised criticisms about and proposed changes to the pride marches in the country. Seeking to resignify the political character of the marches (far from being just a parade) as well as questioning the idea of "Gay Pride Day" linked to them, the marches were renamed "Pride March of Sexual and Gender Diversity".

The first march in the city of Sucre was held in 2007. Between 2008 and 2010 the march was suspended, and since 2011 it has started to be held again.

In 2009, the first pride march in El Alto took place.

Due to the COVID-19 pandemic, the marches in 2020 and 2021 were suspended and online activities were carried out.

In 2022, the First International March of Women, Gender Diversity and Pride was held with the participation of multiple Bolivian towns and areas of the Province of Jujuy in Argentina.

The Bolivia National Pride March has been held in July since 2013 in commemoration of the International LGBT Pride Day.

== See also ==
- LGBT rights in Bolivia
- La Paz Pride
