= Edson Hurtado =

Bolivian journalist, writer, poet, radio journalist, researcher and activist

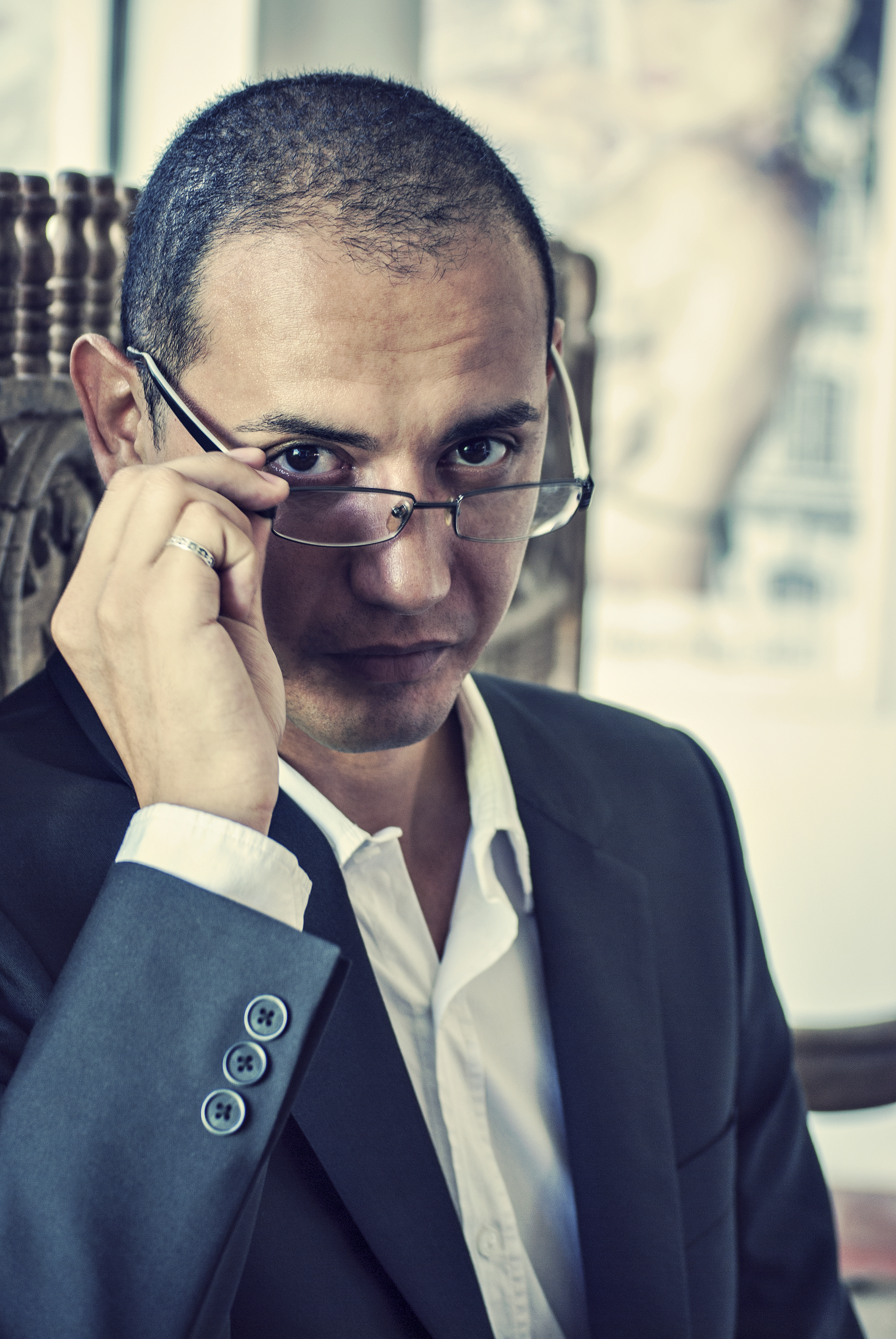
- Hurtado in 2014
- Born: 1980; Vallegrande
- Occupation: Writer, journalist, poet, LGBT rights activist, diplomat

Edson Hurtado Morón (born 1980 in Vallegrande, Bolivia) is a Bolivian journalist, writer, and researcher. He has published more than six books and has an extensive career as a radio and television journalist. Additionally, he worked as head of department at the Ministry of Cultures and Tourism from 2013 to 2016 and directed the documentary Vallegrandino (2021).

== Biography ==
He started his career as a radio presenter at 15 years old in Vallegrande. For more than a decade, he continued working in radio, mainly in local stations. He also started to work in television and was a presenter of interviews like Seres de palabras, shown on TV Culturas and focused on writers. Among his radio shows are Nuestra noche, transmitted for more than five years to a national audience on Radio Santa Cruz.

His first literary works were the poems De sábanas y otras decepciones and ...Y tu nalga también, published in 2007 and 2008, respectively.

At the end of 2010, he published a biography, No volveré a querer, in which he explores the history of the musical group Los Taitas del Beni after a year of research on the topic. The work was a commercial success, which led the publishing house to publish a second edition one month later.

No volveré a querer was followed by the book of chronicles Ser gay en tiempos de Evo, published in 2011 and which gathered the experiences of LGBT Bolivians through 133 testimonials. Agreeing with the author, the book was the first work of non-fiction about homosexuality in the country and was written over a period of eight months. The book was translated to English, Portuguese, and German. Hurtado continued his approach into LGBTQ populations in his next work, Indígenas homosexuales (2014), which was subsequently reissued with the title La Madonna de Sorata: Crónicas sobre indígenas homosexuales, and which explored the life of LGBTQ people belonging to indigenous communities in Bolivia.

In 2016, Hurtado started to work on his first movie, a documentary titled Vallegrandino that premiered online in March 2021. The movie, which has a duration of 100 minutes, explores the story of his grandfather and the history, identity, and customs of the Vallegrande Province through testimonials, photos, interviews, and archives.

Despite his part in the LGBT community, Hurtado has stated that his form of activism forma is through his academic works.

== Works ==
The works of Hurtado include:

=== Poetry ===
- De sábanas y otras decepciones (2007)
- ...Y tu nalga también (2008)

=== Non fiction ===
- No volveré a querer (2010)
- Ser gay en tiempos de Evo (2011)
- La Madonna de Sorata. Crónicas sobre indígenas homosexuales en Bolivia (2014)
