= Sonia Sánchez =

Argentinian writer

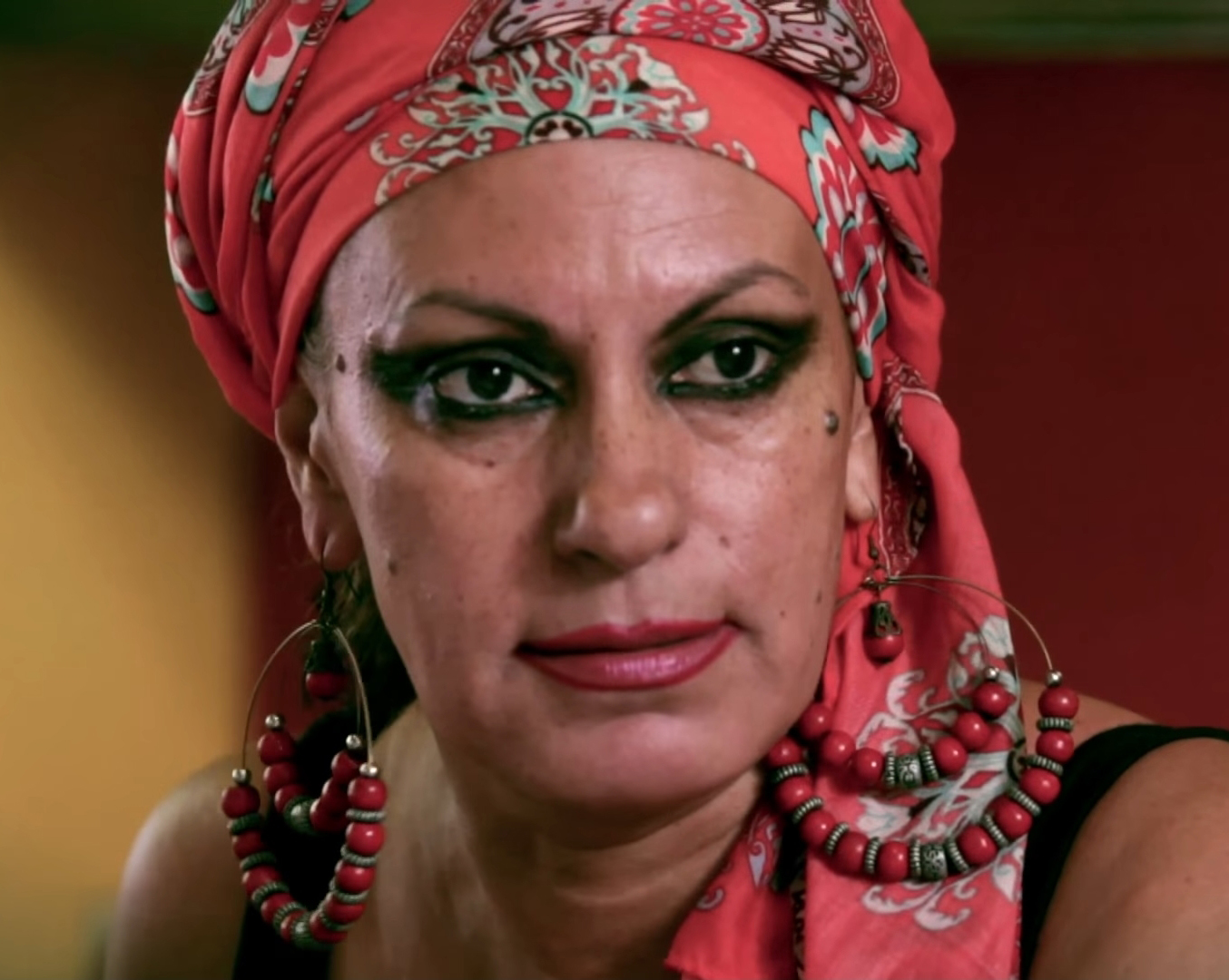
Sonia Sánchez (2015)

Sonia Teresa Sánchez (1964, Villa Ángela, Chaco province) is an Argentine feminist activist, teacher and cultural animator. Sánchez is a survivor of human trafficking for the purpose of sexual exploitation and an advocate for the abolition of prostitution. In 2012 she was elected Outstanding Woman of the Year.

At the age of 17, against her parents' wishes, she traveled from her hometown to Buenos Aires as a domestic worker, but with meager pay. She was thrown out on the street and sexually exploited for six years, from the age of nineteen. She became a member of the Asociación de Mujeres Meretrices de Argentina. She later decided to combine her life experience with theoretical and political reflection on gender, human trafficking and prostitution issues.

On March 8, 2012, she was chosen by the province of Chaco as Outstanding Woman of the Year, in recognition of her tireless work for women's rights. She was chosen by a jury made up of political, social and cultural personalities, who, in addition to considering her worthy of the award established by law, also awarded her the prize for the search for gender equity.

== See also ==
- Feminism in Argentina
