= Erebo =

1955 Bolivian novel by Pablo Gumiel

- Author: Pablo Gumiel
- Language: Spanish
- Genre: fiction
- Publisher: Phoenix Publishing, Asociación Cultural Amistades Particulares
- Publication date: 1955
- Publication place: Bolivia
- ISBN: 978-8-494-87846-6

Erebo is a Spanish novel by Bolivian writer Pablo Gumiel. It was first published in 1955 and is considered one of the earliest pieces of LGBT literature in Bolivia, and in Latin America.

== Synopsis ==
The book narrates the story of Jacob, who is described as blonde and is a homosexual. The novel begins with the description of a union between Jacob and their lover in a hotel room, while they read a letter together. In the letter, Jacob describes their life and how much they had suffered because of the social rejection due to their sexual orientation which they began to discover during their youth. Jacob defines themselves as being "anomalous" creations, which they deem as a punishment by God. Due to the discrimination they were subjected to and faced with an inability to face the prejudices of society, Jacob and their lover decide to commit suicide later.

== Title and author ==
The title of the novel Erebo is derived from the Spanish term for Erebus. According to Greek mythology, Erebus represents darkness and is described as an intermediate place between Hades, representing the underworld, and the Earth, which is a reference to the darkness which the protagonist transits during the course of their life as described in the text.

The book is authored by Pablo Gumiel, on whom there is no biographical information available. While the name was initially presumed to be a pseudonym, subsequent investigations have established that it was his real name and that his family was originally from Potosí, settling later in La Paz.

The novel was originally published by the Phoenix Publishing House in 1955. In 2019, the book was re-released by Asociación Cultural Amistades Particulares, after it remained forgotten from its publication until a Bolivian publisher found a copy in a market of ancient texts in La Paz.

== Reception ==
At the time of its release, Erebo was regarded as an original work which addressed a difficult and humane subject such as homosexuality.

In the reissue, editor Carlos Sanrune narrates the history of the LGBT community in the country in the epilogue section.

== See also ==
- The Witch King (novel)
