= The Witch King (novel) =

2021 novel by H. E. Edgmon

The Witch King is a 2021 English fantasy novel written by H.E. Edgmon. It follows the story of a transgender witch, who has to decide whether to stay and fight for their people or flee the kingdom of Asalin to regain their magic.

== Synopsis ==
Wyatt Croft is a transgender witch, who flees the kingdom of Asalin, after losing control of their magic. They are forced to return to Asalin when their former fiancé, Prince Fae Emyr North, finds them. While North wants to marry Croft in order to secure the throne, they do not want to marry and plan to escape again. However, as they reconnect with Emyr and see the suffering of the people of the kingdom, they are forced to decide whether to choose their freedom and escape or to stay and fight for their people.

== Context ==
The book is authored by H.E. Edgmon. They were inspired to write the novel in the fan fiction genre, after they found that the characters that they came across in the fiction that they had read in their life did not portray the characteristics they wished or wanted to see. After trying to write stories that could fit into conventional literature, they finally decided to write stories that interested them and reflect the characteristics of people like them and those in their environment, giving rise to the novel.

== Reception ==
Writing for Nerd Daily, Mimi Koehler praised the characterization of the main character, Wyatt Croft, highlighting the complexity of the character and how the rejection the character suffered from their parents and the society after they came out as a transgender, and how this made them angry, and how they only wanted to be left alone to live their life. She also highlighted the construction of the rest of the plot characters and the premise of the story.

Alexx, writing for Enthralled Bookworm, appreciated the writing style, mentioning that the story had dark and dramatic moments but also was fun. He commended the characterization of Wyatt Croft as a transgender character, who is conflicted and imperfect, rather than being portrayed as an ideal character who did not make any mistakes.
