= Mujeres Creando =

Mujeres Creando's Mujer Publica, May 2004

Mujeres Creando (Eng: Women Creating) is a Bolivian anarcha-feminist collective that participates in a range of anti-poverty work, including propaganda, street theater and direct action. The group was founded by María Galindo, Mónica Mendoza and Julieta Paredes in 1992 and members including two of Bolivia's only openly lesbian activists. Other notable members include Yola Mamani.

Mujeres Creando publishes Mujer Pública (Eng: Public Woman), produces a weekly radio show, and maintains a cultural café named Virgen de los deseos (Eng: Virgin of Desires).

Founder Julieta Paredes described Mujeres Creando as "a 'craziness' started by three women (Julieta Paredes, María Galindo and Mónica Mendoza) from the arrogant, homophobic and totalitarian Left of Bolivia during the 1980s, where heterosexuality was still the model and feminism was understood to be divisive."

Mujeres Creando gained international attention due to their involvement in the 2001 occupation of the Bolivian Banking Supervisory Agency on behalf of Deudora, an organization of those indebted to microcredit institutions. The occupants, armed with dynamite and molotov cocktails, demanded total debt forgiveness and achieved some limited success. Julieta Ojeda, a member of Mujeres Creando, explains that "in reality the financial institutions were committing usury and extortion, cheating people and exploiting their ignorance, making them sign contracts that they didn’t understand." Mujeres Creando has denied that members directly participated in the occupation.

Since 2001, Mujeres Creando has been led by Maria Galindo; Mujeres Creando Comunidad was formed separately and propelled by Julieta Paredes.

On August 15, 2002, members of Mujeres Creando and supporters involved in the production of an educational film dealing with violence in relation to women's human rights were beaten by La Paz police. The police violence was condemned by the International Gay and Lesbian Human Rights Commission.

== See also ==
- Anarcha-feminism
- Civil disobedience
- Feminism in Latin America
- Gender inequality in Bolivia
- LGBT rights in Bolivia
- Poverty in Bolivia
- Radical feminism
