= Pamela Valenzuela =

Bolivian human rights activist (1963–2021)

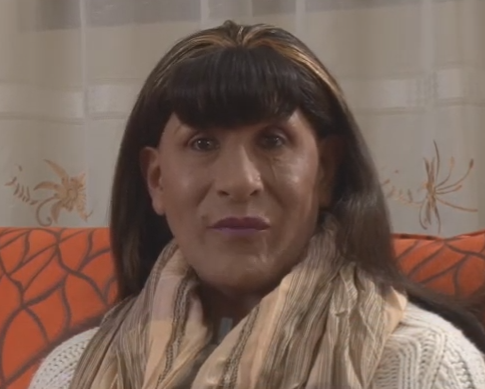
- Valenzuela in 2017
- Born: October 1963; Potosí, Bolivia
- Died: 26 June 2021 (aged 57); La Paz, Bolivia
- Occupation: Human rights activist
- Organization(s): Citizen Council for Sexual and Gender Diversity of La Paz
- Known for: First transgender woman to legally change her gender in Bolivia

Pamela Geraldine Valenzuela Rengel (October 1963 – 26 June 2021) was a Bolivian human rights activist. She was the first transgender woman to legally change her gender in Bolivia.

== Biography ==
Valenzuela was born in October 1963 in Potosí, Bolivia. She began transitioning at the age of 15; due to a lack of support from her family, she dropped out of school and worked for a time as a prostitute. After experiencing violence and discrimination, Valenzuela decided to become an activist for the rights of LGBT people in Bolivia. She was subsequently elected as the Bolivian representative for the Latin American and Caribbean Network of Trans People (RedLacTrans). She served as the president of the Citizen Council for Sexual and Gender Diversity within the Autonomous Municipal Government of La Paz until her death.

Valenzuela was a pioneering force behind what would become Bolivia's Gender Identity Law (law no. 807). Following the law's passing, on 1 August 2016 Valenzuela became the first transgender woman in Bolivia to legally change her gender identity after completing the process at the Civil Registry Service. She publicly stated that "this is a historic day for Bolivia because the State now legally recognises our gender identity. It has been years of struggle, of demanding and insisting that our identity be recognised". Valenzuela received her identity card with her updated gender on 6 September 2016 from the General Service of Personal Identification of La Paz, alongside three other transgender people who had made similar applications under law no. 807.

On 26 June 2021, Valenzuela died of complications from COVID-19, following two weeks in intensive care at a hospital in La Paz. Shortly before her death, she had planned to establish a free phone line for reporting violence against transgender people. The project was subsequently picked up by fellow activist Jessica Velarde. On International LGBTQ Pride Day, which occurred two days following Valenzuela's death, tribute was paid to her by Bolivian authorities and LGBT groups.

A shelter for transgender people in La Paz is named after Valenzuela.
