= Recognition of same-sex unions in Bolivia =

Bolivia has recognised same-sex civil unions since 20 March 2023, following a ruling from the Plurinational Constitutional Tribunal. A same-sex couple successfully registered a civil union on 8 December 2020 in La Paz after having challenged the government's refusal to recognise their relationship in lower court. On 22 June 2022, the Constitutional Court ruled on appeal that the government was obliged to recognise civil unions for same-sex couples and urged the Legislative Assembly to pass legislation recognising same-sex unions. The court ruling went into effect upon publication on 20 March 2023. Bolivia was the seventh country in South America to recognise same-sex unions.

The Constitution of Bolivia has historically been interpreted as not recognizing same-sex marriage. In March 2026, following four years of administrative process and litigation, a court ordered the government to recognize a same-sex couple's relationship as a civil marriage rather than as a civil union.

== Civil unions ==
=== Background ===
In April 2012, Erica Claure, a member of the opposition coalition, the Plan Progress for Bolivia – National Convergence, introduced a bill to the Plurinational Legislative Assembly to legalize same-sex free unions (Spanish: unión libre, pronounced [uˈnjon ˈlibɾe]; Quechua: sirwiñakuy, pronounced [siɾwiˈɲakuj]; Aymara: tantasqalla, pronounced [tantasˈqaʎa]; Guarani: jeiko oñondive, pronounced [ᵈjeiˈko oɲoⁿdiˈʋe]). Lawyer and LGBT activist Víctor Hugo Vidangos indicated that the bill would have granted civil partners equal rights to married couples in terms of inheritance, social security, next of kin, labor law and health care benefits; "We are asking for civil rights, we do not touch religious issues because we are in a secular state", said Hugo Vidangos. The bill was sent to the Human Rights Commission of the Chamber of Deputies for study. It was opposed by the Catholic Church and several members of the Movement for Socialism (MAS). In May 2012, the President of the Chamber of Deputies, Rebeca Delgado, said that the Constitution of Bolivia recognises only unions "between a man and a woman", and MP Juan Carlos Cejas, chair of the Plural Justice Commission of the Chamber of Deputies, said that the bill was probably unconstitutional. In August 2012, Senator Hilda Saavedra from the governing MAS party introduced another civil union bill, citing Article 14(II) of the Bolivian Constitution which prohibits discrimination on the basis of sexual orientation. Both measures were tabled. Saavedra presented another bill in September 2013.

In July 2014, Ombudsman Rolando Villena called for same-sex unions to be included in the country's new family code. On 16 October 2014, the Chamber of Senators passed a revised code without gender-specific terms relating to marriage, which activists hoped would have allowed same-sex couples to enjoy many of the same rights as different-sex couples. The law was approved in the Chamber of Deputies, and was enacted in August 2015. The Family and Family Procedure Code (Código de las Familias y del Proceso Familiar) makes no mention of gender, but it was clarified that it has no legal weight to apply to same-sex couples; article 147 states that free unions and marriages are valid "provided they meet the conditions established in the Political Constitution". In April 2015, Vice President Álvaro García Linera stated that discussion on the legalisation of same-sex unions would happen "sooner rather than later". This statement was followed by the President of the Chamber of Senators, José Alberto Gonzales, announcing his support for discussing the issue: "If they love each other, what is the [problem]?". Subsequently, LGBT activists began advocating for a "Family Life Agreement" (Acuerdo de Vida en Familia), a legal institution separate from marriage or free unions but offering similar legal rights. On 21 September 2015, the Bolivian Coalition of LGBT Collectives (Coalibol; Coalición Boliviana de Colectivos LGBT), handed the Plurinational Legislative Assembly a bill to recognise same-sex unions under the term "Family Life Agreement". The proposal sought to grant same-sex couples the same rights as different-sex couples with the exception of adoption rights. Citing a lack of legislative action in the Assembly, Coalibol delivered the bill to Ombudsman David Tezanos Pinto in September 2016 and asked him to promote it in the Assembly. The group reintroduced its proposal in June 2017, again citing no legislative progress.

=== Recognition of some unions and Constitutional Tribunal ruling ===
Recognition of same-sex unions in South America Marriage Other type of partnership Unrecognized Constitution limits marriage to opposite-sex couples Same-sex sexual activity illegal, though penalties not enforced

On 5 October 2018, David Aruquipa Pérez and Guido Montaño Durán applied to formalise their 9-year-old relationship as a free union at a Civil Registry Service (SERECI; Servicio de Registro Cívico) office in La Paz. The registry refused, arguing that the Constitution prevented the registration of same-sex unions. In September 2019, the SERECI issued a resolution affirming the rejection, and on 10 February 2020 the couple filed a lawsuit challenging the refusal as a violation of Article 256 of the Constitution. On 3 July, the Second Constitutional Chamber of the La Paz Departmental Court of Justice, citing an advisory opinion by the Inter-American Court of Human Rights, ruled in favor of the couple. However, the SERECI later appealed the decision to the Plurinational Constitutional Tribunal. On 9 December, the SERECI reversed its position and issued "Resolution 003/2020", ordering the government to register the couple's relationship. The couple finally registered their union on 18 December. This decision sets a precedent for other same-sex couples to access this recognition in Bolivia. LGBT groups described the decision as "historic".

In May 2021, a SERECI office in La Paz refused to register the relationship of a lesbian couple. A lawyer representing the couple argued that this denial was contradictory to the registry's December 2020 resolution. On 13 May 2022, the couple managed to register their free union after a year of waiting and bureaucratic procedures. On 27 May, a third same-sex couple, Diego Figueroa and David Corchero, was able to formalize their free union by registering their relationship with a SERECI office in Santa Cruz de la Sierra, also after more than a year of waiting. On 7 October, another couple officially registered their free union with a SERECI office in La Paz. The process lasted a month according to the couple. By January 2023, 16 same-sex couples had entered into a free union in Bolivia; 8 in Santa Cruz de la Sierra, 5 in La Paz, and 3 in Cochabamba.

On 22 June 2022, the Constitutional Tribunal ruled in favour of same-sex civil unions, ordering the SERECI to register all civil unions and directed the Legislative Assembly to pass legislation recognising same-sex unions. The ruling went into effect upon publication on 20 March 2023. The SERECI said it would abide by the court ruling. While the ruling did not mention the issue of same-sex marriage, activists believe the ruling "constitutes a precedent in case a couple wants to enter into a civil marriage." The first same-sex civil union in Sucre was performed on 31 March. On 21 July 2023, the Supreme Electoral Tribunal (TSE) announced that same-sex free unions could now be performed in the same manner as opposite-sex ones. The head of the SERECI stated that the regulations related to free unions had been modified so that same-sex unions could be registered with the same requirements and conditions already available to different-sex couples.

=== Statistics ===
101 same-sex civil unions were performed in Bolivia in 2024, based on information provided by the Supreme Electoral Tribunal.

== Same-sex marriage ==
=== Background ===
In July 2010, following the legalisation of same-sex marriage in Argentina, Vice President Álvaro García Linera said that the Cabinet of Bolivia, led by President Evo Morales, had no plans to legalize same-sex marriage. The Family and Family Procedure Code, approved by the Legislative Assembly in 2014, is written in gender-neutral terminology. However, article 147 states that marriages and free unions are valid "provided they meet the conditions established in the Political Constitution". In 2013, constitutionalist Jose Antonio Rivera argued that "article 63 of the Constitution does not foresee a prohibition on marriages between people of the same sex; what it does is characterize the modalities of marriages between a man and a woman". Antonio Rivera stated that pursuant to Articles 14(II) and 66 of the Constitution, which prohibit discrimination on the basis of sexual orientation and recognise sexual freedom, same-sex couples should be able to marry in Bolivia, but that interpretation of the articles lays with the Plurinational Constitutional Tribunal. Article 63(I) of the Constitution of Bolivia states that:

Marriage between a woman and a man is formed by legal bond and is based on equality of the rights and duties of the spouses. (Note: In some official languages of Bolivia: Spanish: El matrimonio entre una mujer y un hombre se constituye por vínculos jurídicos y se basa en la igualdad de derechos y deberes de los cónyuges.; Quechua: Kamachiymanjina warmiwan qhariwan sawarakuyninkuqa kanan tiyan, iskayninku kikin ruway atiyniyuq chantapis ruwayniyuq kanku.; Aymara: Chacha warmi jaqichasiña phuqhapxatapaxa kamachi taypina utt'atawa, ukhamarusa purapata derecho katuqañataki ukhamaraki wakisirikanaka khuskhata katuqapaxañapatakiwa.; Guarani: Kuña kuimbae ndive oyogüireko tupapire rupi vae jae reta ko oyapo jupigüe vae, jare oyovake güinoi tekomboe yeokuai, ñoguinoi ramo metei ramiño.; Mojeño-Trinitario: No 'remano etna 'seno etna 'jiro eno tparaakono taye'e to vye'eono 'wosaregrampoo'i wo nakuchkim'i te titapopo to nemtone te añinapo ene tpajkoyre to najakpogñono, tajina nachiyire wo nakemotonejyore te'to taetuchapoo'i to 'moneko taye'e te sintikatu.; Guarayu: Mendasa kuña kuimba'e oyeapo ikwachiaprɨ va'e rupi a'e yuvɨrekoi yeroyasa pɨpe iyavei mborokwaita pɨpe.; Chiquitano: Axɨna poosokox aɨbu paɨx taityo ñoñɨnx sɨromatɨ au nɨriakax taityo ichepeatai niyobesaxatoe taityo niyupachikoikixh au niyoposokox.; Cavineña: Kakemiti deka epuna juya tuke vinculo jurídico tume tuke juya tashe tupu juya tatseja derechu tume baedya deberes Ekakemitike.)

=== Court cases ===
On 9 January 2018, the Inter-American Court of Human Rights (IACHR) issued an advisory opinion that parties to the American Convention on Human Rights should grant same-sex couples "accession to all existing domestic legal systems of family registration, including marriage, along with all rights that derive from marriage". The advisory opinion states that:

The State must recognize and guarantee all rights derived from a family bond between persons of the same sex in accordance with the provisions of Articles 11.2 and 17.1 of the American Convention. (...) in accordance with articles 1.1, 2, 11.2, 17, and 24 of the American Convention, it is necessary to guarantee access to all the existing figures in domestic legal systems, including the right to marry. (..) To ensure the protection of all the rights of families formed by same-sex couples, without discrimination with respect to those that are constituted by heterosexual couples.

Bolivia ratified the American Convention on Human Rights on 19 July 1979 and recognized the court's jurisdiction on 27 July 1993. Human rights activists believe Bolivia is now required to legalise same-sex marriage under Article 256 of the Political Constitution, which states:

I. The international treaties and instruments in matters of human rights that have been signed and/or ratified, or those that have been joined by the State, which declare rights more favorable than those contained in the Constitution, shall have preferential application over those in this Constitution. II. The rights recognized in the Constitution shall be interpreted in agreement with international human rights treaties when the latter provide more favorable norms.

On 13 March 2026, following four years of administrative process and litigation, a court in La Paz ordered the government to recognize a same-sex couple's relationship as a civil marriage rather than as a civil union. The couple, Fabiana Justiniano and Scarlett Rocha, were denied a marriage license by a SERECI office in Santa Cruz de la Sierra in 2022, but subsequently filed a lawsuit challenging the refusal as unconstitutional and a violation of the 2018 IACHR advisory opinion. The court ordered the government to issue a marriage license within ten days, though it took approximately five months to be issued. The couple married in Santa Cruz on 7 August, marking the first same-sex marriage in Bolivia. The ruling only applies to this couple, but it could have broader implications according to Human Rights Watch, which issued a statement that "[u]nder Bolivian law, the Plurinational Constitutional Court will review the decision, creating an opportunity to establish a precedent for other same-sex couples seeking equal marriage rights." "This is an important precedent because, just as these two women in Santa Cruz were able to formalize their marriage, there will surely be other couples who come forward seeking the same recognition," added a senior official at the Ombudsman's Office.

=== Religious performance ===
The Catholic Church, the largest Christian denomination in Bolivia, opposes same-sex marriage and does not allow its priests to officiate at such marriages. In May 2012, the Episcopal Conference of Bolivia condemned a proposed bill to recognise same-sex civil unions as "a serious threat to the family, as understood by the wisdom of the native peoples, the cultural tradition of our society and Christian doctrine". In 2017, it urged the government to limit "the concept of marriage only for biological unions between a man and a woman and that these marriages be given particular protection." In December 2023, the Holy See published Fiducia supplicans, a declaration allowing Catholic priests to bless couples who are not considered to be married according to church teaching, including the blessing of same-sex couples. The Episcopal Conference stated that Fiducia is a "merciful response in the great mission of Pope Francis to care for these couples with a heart of tenderness, kindness, affection and attention," but reiterated that the declaration does not allow for same-sex marriage ceremonies in the Church.

== Public opinion ==
According to a Pew Research Center survey conducted between 7 November 2013 and 13 February 2014, 22% of Bolivians supported same-sex marriage and 67% were opposed. A poll conducted in June 2015 by newspaper Página Siete found that 74% of Bolivians opposed same-sex marriage. The 2017 AmericasBarometer showed that 35% of Bolivians supported same-sex marriage, whereas according to the 2023 AmericasBarometer support stood at 23%.

== See also ==
- LGBT rights in Bolivia
- Recognition of same-sex unions in the Americas
