= LGBTQ rights in Bolivia =

- Bolivia
- Legal status: Legal since 1832
- Gender identity: Right to change legal gender since 2016
- Discrimination protections: Sexual orientation and gender identity protections

Family rights
- Recognition of relationships: Free unions officially recognised starting in 2020; nationwide since 2023
- Restrictions: Same-sex marriage banned by Constitution
- Adoption: No

Lesbian, gay, bisexual, and transgender (LGBT) rights in Bolivia have expanded significantly in the 21st century. Both male and female same-sex sexual activity and same-sex civil unions are legal in Bolivia. The Bolivian Constitution bans discrimination on the basis of sexual orientation and gender identity. In 2016, Bolivia passed a comprehensive gender identity law, seen as one of the most progressive laws relating to transgender people in the world.

Following a decision from the Inter-American Court of Human Rights in January 2018, recognising same-sex marriage as a right under the American Convention on Human Rights and which set binding precedent for Bolivian courts, and pending a decision from the Plurinational Constitutional Court, the Civil Registry Service announced its intention on 9 December 2020 to issue civil union ("free union") certificates offering all of the legal rights, benefits and responsibilities of marriage to same-sex couples. As of January 2023, there are fifteen same-sex couples who have officially registered their free union based on the application of Advisory Opinion OC-24/17 of November 24, 2017 issued by the Inter-American Court of Human Rights.

Bolivia has recognised same-sex civil unions since 20 March 2023 in accordance with a ruling from the Plurinational Constitutional Court. The court ruled on 22 June 2022 that the Civil Registry Service (SERECI) was obliged to recognise civil unions for same-sex couples and urged the Legislative Assembly to pass legislation recognising same-sex unions. The court ruling went into effect upon publication on 20 March 2023.

On 21 July 2023, the Supreme Electoral Tribunal announced that same-sex free unions could now be performed in the same conditions as opposite-sex ones. The head of the Civic Registry Service (SERECI) stated that the regulations related to free unions had been modified so that same-sex unions can be registered with the same requirements and timings that had already been available for heterosexual couples.

Nevertheless, reports of discrimination against LGBT people are not uncommon. In 2017, the Bolivian Ombudsman reported that 64 LGBT people had been murdered in the country that year, of which only 14 cases had been investigated and none which resulted in a sentence.

== History ==
Prior to Spanish colonisation, various indigenous peoples inhabited modern-day Bolivia. Among these were the Quechua people (including the Incas), the Aymara people, the Guaraní people, the Chiquitano, and the Moxo, among others. Homosexuality and same-sex relationships has been documented among these people groups, with varying levels of acceptance.

The Moxo, Chiquitano, Guaraní and Chiriguanos peoples tended to view homosexuality with indifference. The Aymara people regarded homosexuals as supernatural beings and shamans, capable of magic. However, this past acceptance and openness are not so present in modern times. The conversion to Christianity, which traditionally has regarded homosexuality as sinful, has resulted in a climate of homophobia and persecution for LGBT people. This is notably true among the Aymara, whose popular culture now regards homosexuality as a synonym to infidelity or bad luck. The traditional perception of homosexuality, especially male homosexuality, by the Incas is still unclear and is the subject of ongoing debates. While in the north of the Empire ("Chinchaysuyo") it was tolerated, in the center and south it seems to have been persecuted with special intensity. Likewise, the Incas had special consideration for lesbians whom they called holjoshta. The Inca Capac Yupanqui used to have a very special affection for these women.

== Legality of same-sex sexual activity ==
Same-sex sexual activity has been legal since 1832.

The age of consent in Bolivia is set at 14 per article 308bis (known as "Rape of Infants, Girls, Boys and Adolescents" (Violación Infantes, Niña, Niño y Adolescentes)) of the Criminal Code, which punishes rape (violación) of children under 14, "even without the use of force or intimidation and when consent is alleged" (así no haya uso de la fuerza o intimidación y se alegue consentimiento). There is a close in age exemption of three years.

== Recognition of same-sex relationships ==
Article 63 of the Constitution of Bolivia limits marriage to heterosexual couples. In July 2010, following the legalisation of same-sex marriage in Argentina, Vice President Álvaro García Linera said that the government had no plans to legalize same-sex marriage.

In April 2012, a member of the opposition coalition, the National Convergence, introduced a bill in the Plurinational Legislative Assembly to legalize same-sex civil unions. However, the bill stalled and was not approved. Multiple similar proposals were introduced in the following years, but all stalled due to opposition from the Catholic Church and several members of the governing Movement for Socialism party.

On 9 January 2018, the Inter-American Court of Human Rights (IACHR) issued an advisory opinion that parties to the American Convention on Human Rights should grant same-sex couples "accession to all existing domestic legal systems of family registration, including marriage, along with all rights that derive from marriage". Following the decision, a same-sex couple, David Aruquipa Pérez and Guido Montaño Durán, went to a Civil Registry Service (SERECI) office in La Paz in October 2018 seeking to formalise their 9-year-old relationship as a free union, which are offered the same rights as marriages. The Registry refused, but on 9 December 2020, following a court ruling in favour of the couple by the Second Constitutional Chamber of the La Paz Departmental Court of Justice on 3 July 2020, it reversed its position. It issued "Resolution 003/2020", ordering the registration of the free union of Aruquipa Pérez and Montaño Durán. The couple finally registered their union on 18 December 2020. This decision sets a precedent for other same-sex couples to access this recognition in Bolivia. LGBT groups described the decision as "historic".

In May 2021, however, a SERECI office in La Paz refused to register the relationship of a lesbian couple. A lawyer representing the couple argued that this denial is contradictory to the Registry's own resolution issued in December 2020.

On May 13, 2022, another same-sex couple managed to register their free union based on the Advisory Opinion OC-24/17, after a year of waiting and bureaucratic procedures. On May 27, 2022, a third same-sex couple was able to formalize their free union by registering their relationship with the Civil Registry Service of the city of Santa Cruz, whose administrative process lasted more than a year.

On October 7, 2022, a fourth couple officially registered their free union in the offices of the Civic Registry Service of La Paz. The process lasted a month according to the couple. In January 2023, the LGBT organization MANODIVERSA reported that, nationwide, fifteen same-sex couples have managed to register their free union, mainly in the cities of Santa Cruz, La Paz and Cochabamba.

Bolivia has recognised same-sex civil unions since 20 March 2023 in accordance with a ruling from the Plurinational Constitutional Court. The court ruled on 22 June 2022 that the Civil Registry Service (SERECI) was obliged to recognise civil unions for same-sex couples and urged the Legislative Assembly to pass legislation recognising same-sex unions. The court ruling went into effect upon publication on 20 March 2023.

On 21 July 2023, the Supreme Electoral Tribunal announced that same-sex free unions could now be performed in the same conditions as opposite-sex ones. The head of the Civic Registry Service (SERECI) stated that the regulations related to free unions had been modified so that same-sex unions can be registered with the same requirements and timings that had already been available for heterosexual couples.

== Adoption and parenting ==
Single people, regardless of their sexual orientation, may adopt children, and same-sex couples in a free union are permitted to adopt in Bolivia, according to Article 84 of the Child and Adolescent Code.

== Discrimination protections ==
Article 14(II) of the Constitution of Bolivia, implemented in February 2009, prohibits and punishes discrimination based on sexual orientation and gender identity. (Note: The official text of Article 14(II) in Spanish: El Estado prohíbe y sanciona toda forma de discriminación fundada en razón de sexo, color, edad, orientación sexual, identidad de género, origen, cultura, nacionalidad, ciudadanía, idioma, credo religioso, ideología, filiación política o filosófica, estado civil, condición económica o social, tipo de ocupación, grado de instrucción, discapacidad, embarazo, u otras que tengan por objetivo o resultado anular o menoscabar el reconocimiento, goce o ejercicio, en condiciones de igualdad, de los derechos de toda persona.)

=== Anti-discrimination law ===
The Law Against Racism and All Forms of Discrimination (Spanish: Ley Contra el Racismo y Toda Forma de Discriminación) defines discrimination as "any form of distinction, exclusion, restriction or preference based on sex, colour, age, sexual orientation and gender identity, origin, culture, nationality, citizenship, language, religion, ideology, political or philosophical affiliation, marital status, economic, social or health status, profession, occupation, level of education, disabilities and/or physical disabilities, intellectual or sensory impairment, pregnancy, origin, physical appearance, clothing, surname or other that have the purpose or effect of nullifying or impairing the recognition, enjoyment or exercise, on an equal footing, of human rights and fundamental freedoms recognized by the Constitution and international law." It also provides definitions for homophobia and transphobia.

The law amended article 281 of the Penal Code to criminalize discrimination based on sexual orientation or gender identity. It also bans "dissemination and incitement to racism and discrimination", stating that anyone who "through any means broadcasts ideas based on racial superiority or hatred, or that promote or justify racism or any kind of discrimination on the grounds described above, or that incite to violence or persecution of people, based on racist or discriminatory motives will be imprisoned from one to five years." (Note: The official text of Article 281ter. in Spanish: La persona que arbitrariamente e ilegalmente obstruya, restrinja, menoscabe, impida o anule el ejercicio de los derechos individuales y colectivos, por motivos de sexo, edad, género, orientación sexual e identidad de género, identidad cultural, filiación familiar, nacionalidad, ciudadanía, idioma, credo religioso, ideología, opinión política o filosófica, estado civil, condición económica o social, enfermedad, tipo de ocupación, grado de instrucción, capacidades diferentes o discapacidad física, intelectual o sensorial, estado de embarazo, procedencia regional, apariencia física y vestimenta, será sancionado con pena privativa de libertad de uno a cinco años.)

Despite these protections, reports of societal discrimination against LGBT people are not uncommon.

=== Hate crime law ===
Since 2010, article 40bis of the Penal Code aggravates the penalties of crimes motivated by any of the discriminatory grounds included in article 281ter, including sexual orientation and gender identity. In May 2016, the LGBT rights group Colectivo de Lesbianas, Gays, Bisexuales y personas Transgénero presented to the Plurinational Legislative Assembly a draft law against hate crimes based on sexual orientation or gender identity, which includes a penalty of 30 years imprisonment.

== Transgender rights ==
On 25 November 2015, a law was proposed that would allow transgender people to change their legal name and sex. On 19 May 2016, the Chamber of Deputies passed the Gender Identity Law (Spanish: Ley de Identidad de Género). One day later, the Chamber of Senators passed the measure by simple majority votes. On 21 May 2016, the legislation was signed into law by Vice President Álvaro García Linera, and it took effect on 1 August 2016. In October 2016, the Bolivian Congress debated whether to repeal it.

The law allows individuals over 18 to legally change their name, sex and photography on legal documents. A psychological test proving that the person knows and voluntarily assumes the change of identity is required, but sex reassignment surgery is not. The process is confidential and must be carried out before the Civil Registry Service. The processing of the new documentation will take 15 days. The change of name and sex will be reversible once, after which they cannot modify these data again.

On 1 August 2016, activist Pamela Valenzuela became the first transgender woman to legally change her gender in Bolivia.

The newly assigned sex is not, however, recognized for the purpose of marriage. In June 2017, the Supreme Electoral Tribunal instructed the Civil Registry Service to recognize the newly assigned sex of transgender people in their requests to marry. In November 2017, the Supreme Court of Bolivia invalidated this instruction, ruling it unconstitutional, and declaring that a sex changed under the law may not be recognized for the purpose of marriage. LGBT groups filed an appeal with the Inter-American Court of Human Rights in May 2018.

== Military service ==
The Armed Forces of Bolivia announced in 2013 that LGBT citizens would be allowed to serve beginning in 2015. Bolivia also allows transgender people to serve openly in the military. Despite this, homosexuality in the military is still viewed as taboo, and LGBT individuals may want to remain discreet about their sexual orientation or gender identity.

== Blood donation ==
Since 10 July 2019, the Supreme Decree 24547 of 1997 (Spanish: Decreto Supremo Nº 24547) has permitted men who have sex with men to donate blood.

Previously, the decree banned homosexual and bisexual men from donating blood, labelling them "a high-risk group". In June 2016, the Ombudsman asked the government to amend the decree, stating that the Law Against Racism and All Forms of Discrimination forbids discrimination based on sexual orientation.

== Public opinion ==
A 2013 Pew Research Center opinion survey showed that 43% of Bolivians believed that homosexuality should be accepted by society, while 49% believed it should not. Younger people were more accepting: 53% of people between 18 and 29 believed it should be accepted, 43% of people between 30 and 49 and 27% of people over 50.

In May 2015, PlanetRomeo, an LGBT social network, published its first Gay Happiness Index (GHI). Gay men from over 120 countries were asked about how they feel about society's view on homosexuality, how do they experience the way they are treated by other people and how satisfied are they with their lives. Bolivia was ranked 48th with a GHI score of 47.

According to a 2017 poll carried out by ILGA, 60% of Bolivians agreed that gay, lesbian and bisexual people should enjoy the same rights as straight people, while 17% disagreed. Additionally, 64% agreed that they should be protected from workplace discrimination. 26% of Bolivians, however, said that people who are in same-sex relationships should be charged as criminals, while a plurality of 45% disagreed. As for transgender people, 64% agreed that they should have the same rights, 63% believed they should be protected from employment discrimination and 53% believed they should be allowed to change their legal gender.

The 2017 AmericasBarometer showed that 35% of Bolivians supported same-sex marriage.

== Summary table ==
Same-sex sexual activity legal	Yes (Since 1832)
Equal age of consent (14)	Yes (Since 1832)
Anti-discrimination laws in employment	Yes (Since 2009)
Anti-discrimination laws in the provision of goods and services	Yes (Since 2009)
Anti-discrimination laws in all other areas (incl. indirect discrimination, hate speech)	Yes (Since 2009)
Hate crime laws covering both sexual orientation and gender identity	Yes (Since 2010)
Same-sex marriage	No (Constitutional ban on same-sex marriage since 2009)
Recognition of same-sex couples (e.g. free unions)	Yes (Starting in 2020; nationwide since 2023)
Stepchild and joint adoption by same-sex couples	No
LGBT people allowed to serve in the military	Yes (Since 2015)
Right to change legal gender	Yes (Since 2016)
Access to IVF for lesbian couples	No
Conversion therapy banned on minors	No
Commercial surrogacy for gay male couples	
MSMs allowed to donate blood	Yes (Since 2019)

== See also ==
- Human rights in Bolivia
- LGBT rights in the Americas
- C.C. Téllez

== Bibliography ==
- Hurtado, Edson (2014). Indígenas homosexuals – Un acercamiento a la cosmovisión sobre diversidades sexuales de siete pueblos originarios del Estado Plurinacional de Bolivia (Moxeños, Afrobolivianos, Quechuas, Ayoreos, Guaraníes, Tacanas y Aymaras) (PDF) (in Spanish). Conexión Fondo de Emancipación. Archived from the original (PDF) on 7 February 2016.
