= Wila Qullu (Turco) =

Mountain in Bolivia

- Location within Bolivia

Highest point
- Elevation: 4,730 m (15,520 ft)
- Coordinates: 18°24′08″S 68°58′21″W

Geography
- Location: Bolivia, Oruro Department
- Parent range: Andes, Cordillera Occidental

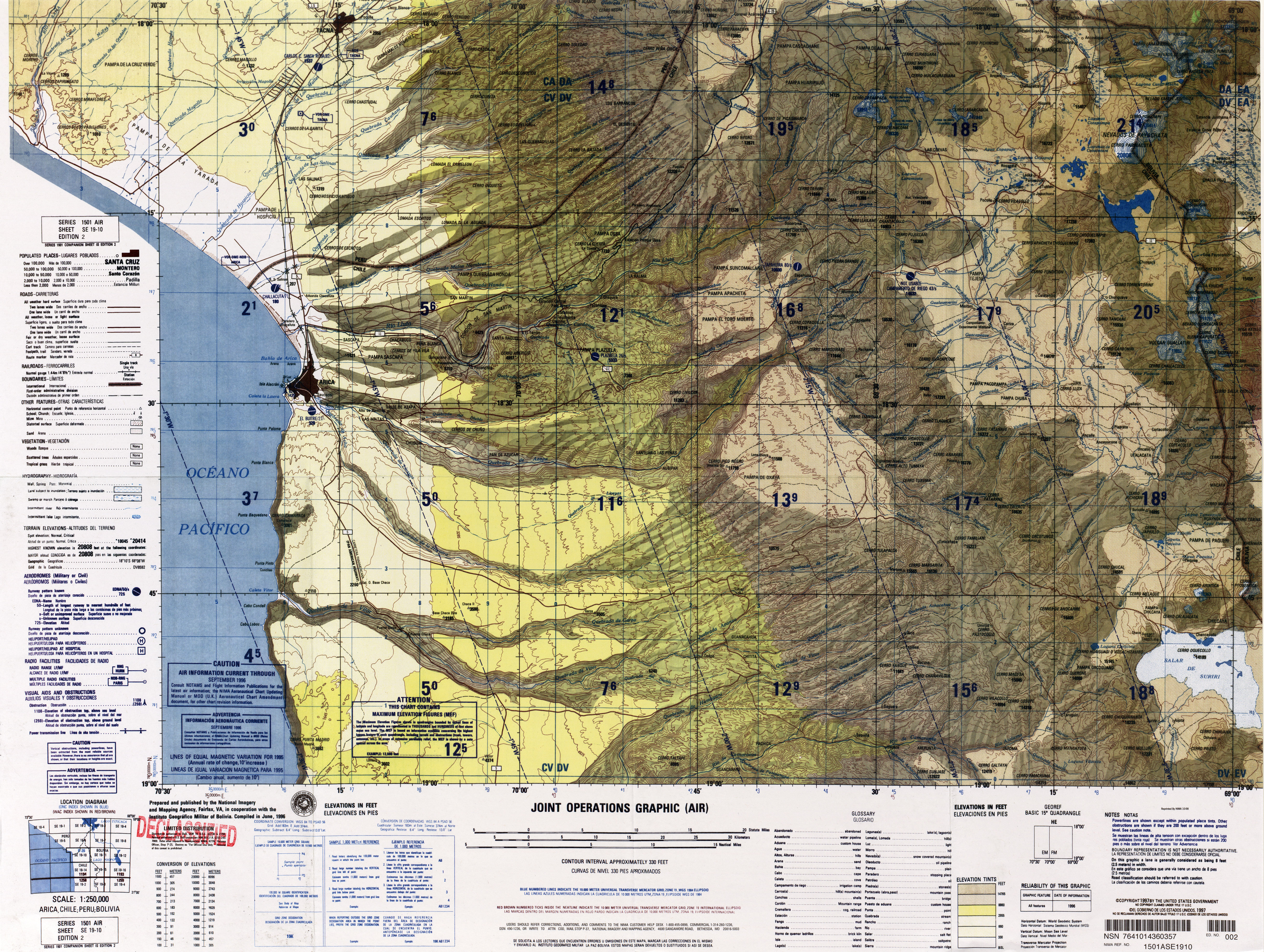
Map showing the location of Wila Qullu

Wila Qullu (Aymara wila red or blood, qullu mountain, "red mountain", Hispanicized spelling Wila Kkollu) is a 4,730-metre-high (15,518 ft) mountain in the Cordillera Occidental in the Andes of Bolivia. It is located in the Oruro Department, Sajama Province, Turco Municipality, Chachacomani Canton. The mountain is situated east of the volcanoes Capurata, Acotango and Wallatiri and north-east of the mountain Ari Qullu Phujru. It lies south of the Bolivian Route 4 that leads to Tambo Quemado on the border with Chile.

There is a valley north of Wila Qullu named Wila Q'awa (Aymara for "red brook" or "red ravine", Wila Khaua). Its intermittent stream flows to the south-east where it meets the Sajama River as a right affluent.

== See also ==
- Kuntur Ikiña
- Umurata
- Wallatiri
- Sajama National Park
- Salla Qullu
- List of mountains in the Andes
