= Turco Municipality =

Turco Municipality Turku
- Municipality
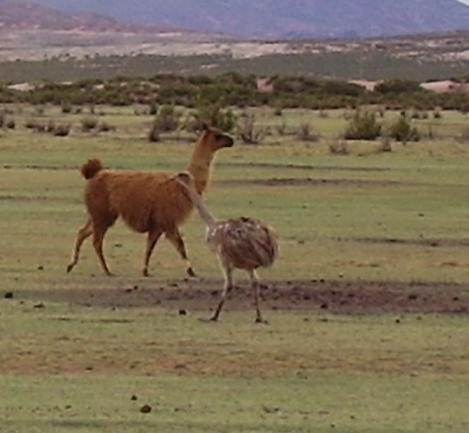
- Darwin's rhea (Rhea pennata garleppi) photographed at the Tika Uta ranch, Turco Municipality

- Flag

- Location of the Turco Municipality within Bolivia
- Coordinates: 18°10′S 68°11′W
- Country: Bolivia
- Department: Oruro Department
- Province: Sajama Province
- Cantons: 4
- Created: February 15, 1957
- Seat: Turco

Area
  - Total: 1,534 sq mi (3,973 km^{2})
- Elevation: 12,660 ft (3,860 m)

Population (2001)
  - Total: 4,160
  - Ethnicities: Aymara

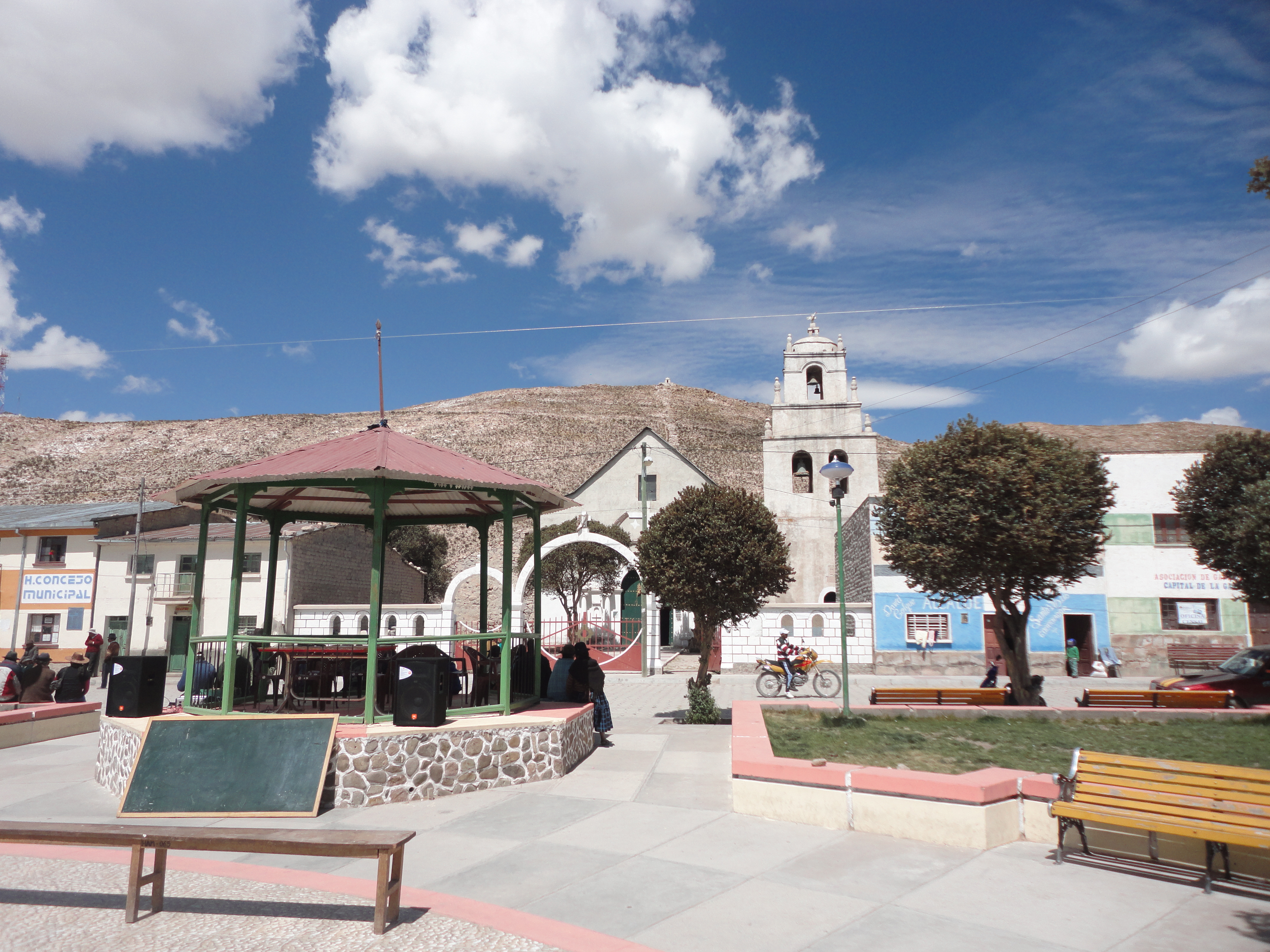
Main square of Turco

Turco Municipality is the second municipal section of the Sajama Province in the Oruro Department in Bolivia, and was founded on February 15, 1957. Its seat is Turco, situated 154 km west of Oruro at an altitude of 3,860 m. The municipality covers an area of 3,973 km², not taking into account the area of Laca Laca Canton.

It is bordered to the north by the Curahuara de Carangas Municipality and San Pedro de Totora Province, to the south by the Litoral and Sabaya Provinces, to the west by Chile and to the east by the Carangas Province (Qhurqhi (Corque) and Chuqi Quta (Choquecota) Municipalities).

== Geography ==
The most important rivers are Sajama, Cosapa, Lauca, K'uwiri and Qullpa Jawira (also named río Turco, Turco River) .

A couple of volcanoes and mountains of the Bolivian Western Mountain Range like Uqi Uqini and the volcanic complex of Kimsa Chata, a group of three mountains named Umurata, Acotango and Capurata in the west of the municipality are making up the natural border of Turco Municipality with Chile. Other mountains are listed below:

- Ari Qullu Phujru
- Asu Asuni
- Chachakumani
- Chilli Qhata
- Chullkani
- Chunkarani
- Chuqil Qamiri
- Ch'alla Willk'i
- Ch'iyar Jaqhi
- Ch'iyar Jaqhi (near Qhapaqa)
- Ch'iyar Jaqhi (Umurata)
- Ch'iyar Qullu
- Jach'a K'uchu
- Jach'a Qullu
- Janq'u Jaqhi
- Janq'u Willk'i
- Kimsa Chata (Sajama)
- Kimsa Misa
- Kiswara
- Kuntur Ikiña
- Liyun Ikiña
- Mamaniri
- Ñuñu Qullu
- Ñuñutani
- Picha Qullu
- Pichaqani
- Pukarani
- Phaq'u Qullu
- Phasa Willk'i
- Q'ara Qullu
- Q'aysiri
- Q'ulin Ch'utu
- Qhapaqa
- Salla Qullu
- Tankani
- Taypi Qullu
- Taypi Qullu (near Junt'u Uta)
- Titiri
- Turi Turini
- Uqi Uqini
- Uqi Uqini (Bolivia)
- Uyarani
- Wankarani
- Warin Uma
- Waylla Sirka
- Wayna Chullunkhäni
- Wayna
- Wichhu Qullu
- Wila Lat'arata
- Wila Qullu (Qutallani)
- Wila Qullu (Turco)
- Willk'i
- Yapu Qullu
- Yaritani

== Subdivision ==
The municipality is divided into four cantons and nine ayllus.

Canton	Created	Inhabitants (2001)
Asunción Laca Laca	December 21, 1962	342
Chachakumani	August 30, 1957	374
Cosapa	November 11, 1950	918
Turco	July 27, 1951	2,526

== Flora and fauna ==
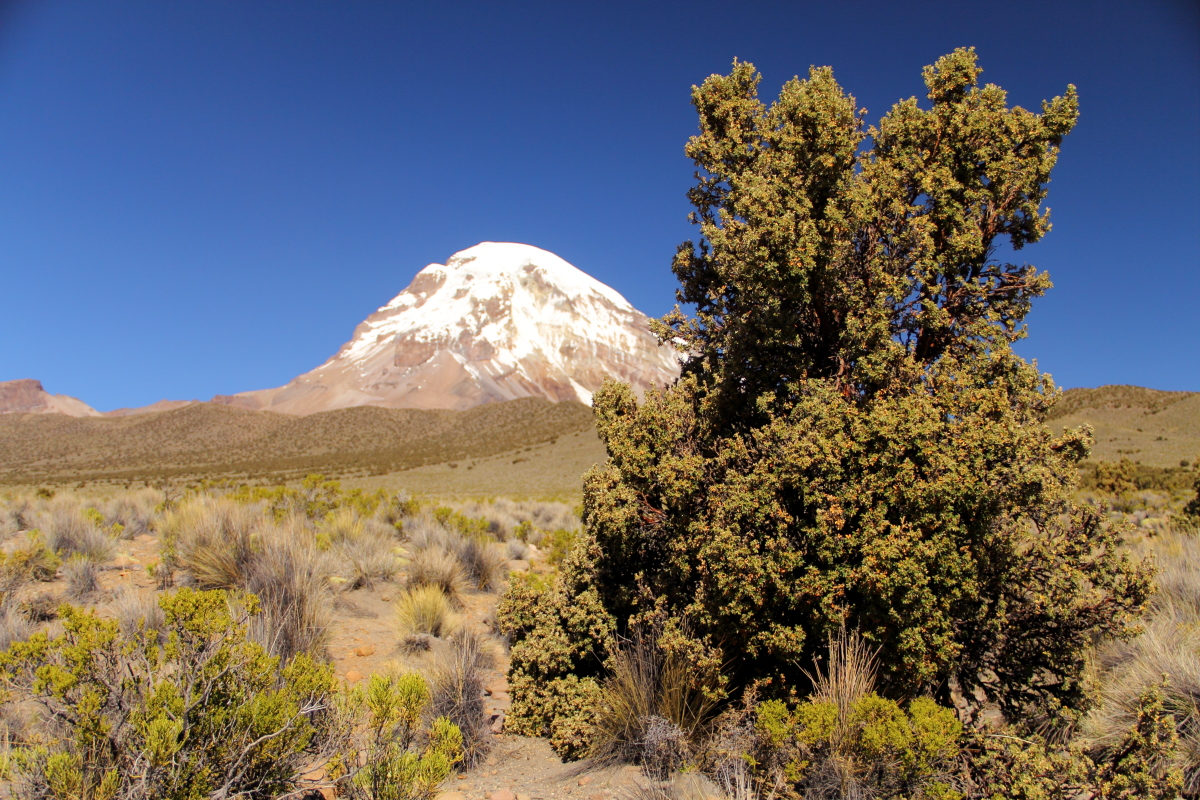
Polylepis tarapacana near Sajama volcano

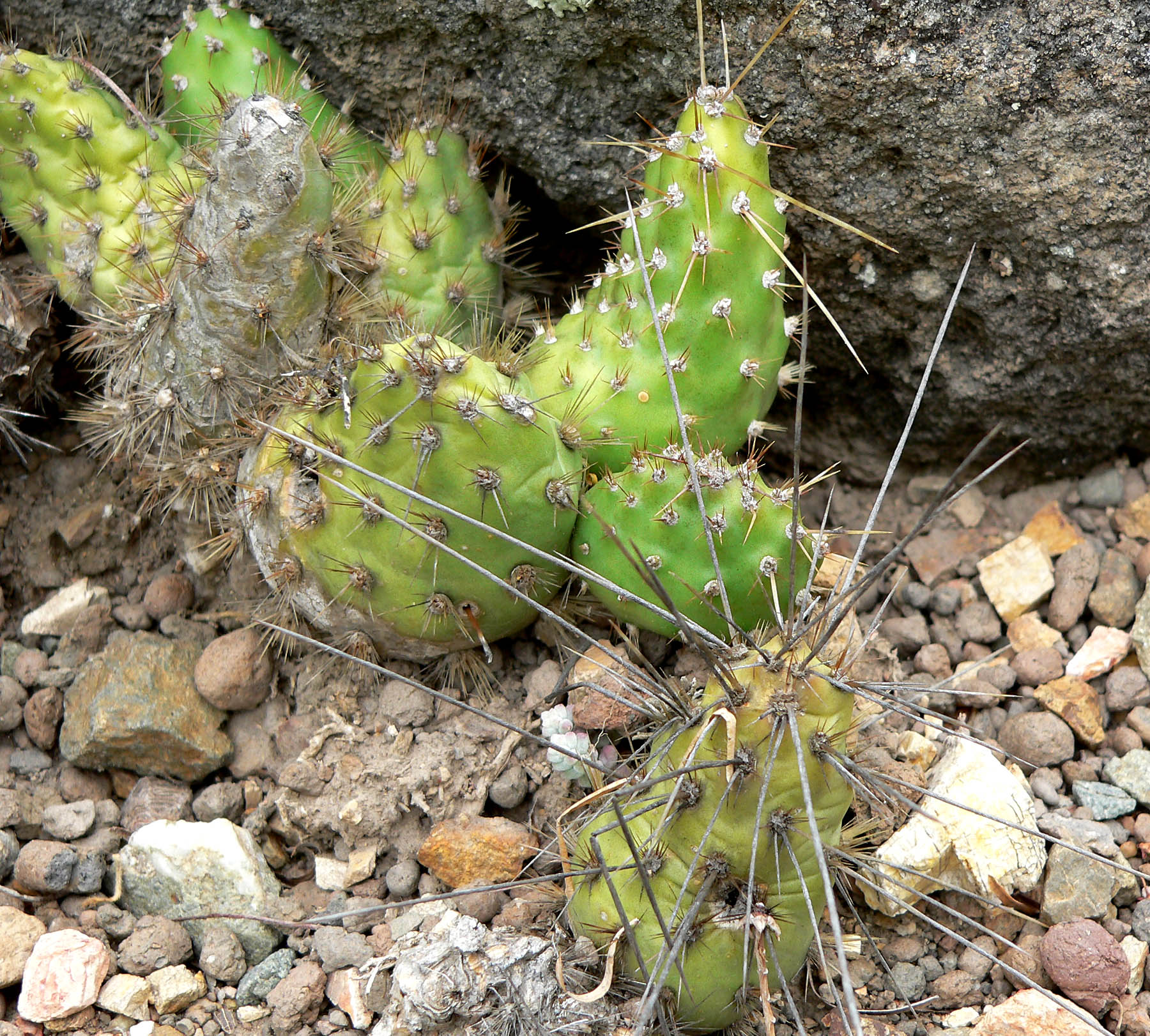
Tunilla soehrensii

Part of Cosapa Canton is situated within Sajama National Park. This park was created to conserve the rare woods of the queñua species Polylepis tarapacana and to protect species of wild flora and fauna like yareta (Azorella compacta), Andean hairy armadillo (Chaetophractus nationi), Darwin's rhea (Pterocnemia pennata), vicuña (Vicugna vicugna), taruca (Hippocamelus antisensis), Andean mountain cat (Felis jacobita) and cougar or puma (Felis concolor), all of them occurring in the municipality, as well as their habitat.

The region has a rich diversity of native plants which are both useful for the inhabitants and the animals. The most important species are:

Common name	Scientific name	Usability
Añawaya	Adesmia spinosissima	forage for llamas
Waylla	Stipa obtusa	forage for llamas
Ichu	Stipa ichu	forage, handicraft
Iru ichu	Festuca orthophylla	forage, handicraft
Qanlli kiska	Tetraglochin cristatum	forage
Chillka	Senecio pampae	forage, medical plant
Yarita, yareta	Azorella asorella	medical plant, heating material
Tara tara	Fabiana densa	medical plant, heating material
Ñaka thula	Baccharis incarum	medical plant, heating material
Supu thula	Parastrephya lepidophylla	medical plant, heating material
Ayrampu	Opuntia soehrensii / Tunilla soehrensii	medical plant, forage
Muña muña	Satureja ovata	medical plant, forage
Itapallu	Cajophora horrida	medical plant, forage
Kinwa, queñua	Polylepis tarapacana	forage, heating material, ornamental
Chachakuma	Escallonia resinosa	medical plant
Llapa, pasto bandera	Boutelova simplex	forage
Yawarilla, cebadilla común	Bromus unioloides	forage
Cebadilla de montaña	Agrostis breviculmis	forage
Chiji blanco	Distichlis humilis	forage
Chiji negro	Mulenbergia fastigiata	forage
Garbancillo	Astragalus garbancillo	toxic
Lampaya	Lampaya medicinalis	medical plant, forage, heating material
Qura	Cajophora horrida	forage
K’achu	Anoda triangularis	forage

== The people ==
Most of the people in the municipality are of Aymara descent known as Carangas. They are mostly bilingual. According to census 2001 the main languages spoken are Spanish (3,544 speakers) and Aymara (3,259 speakers).

== Transport ==
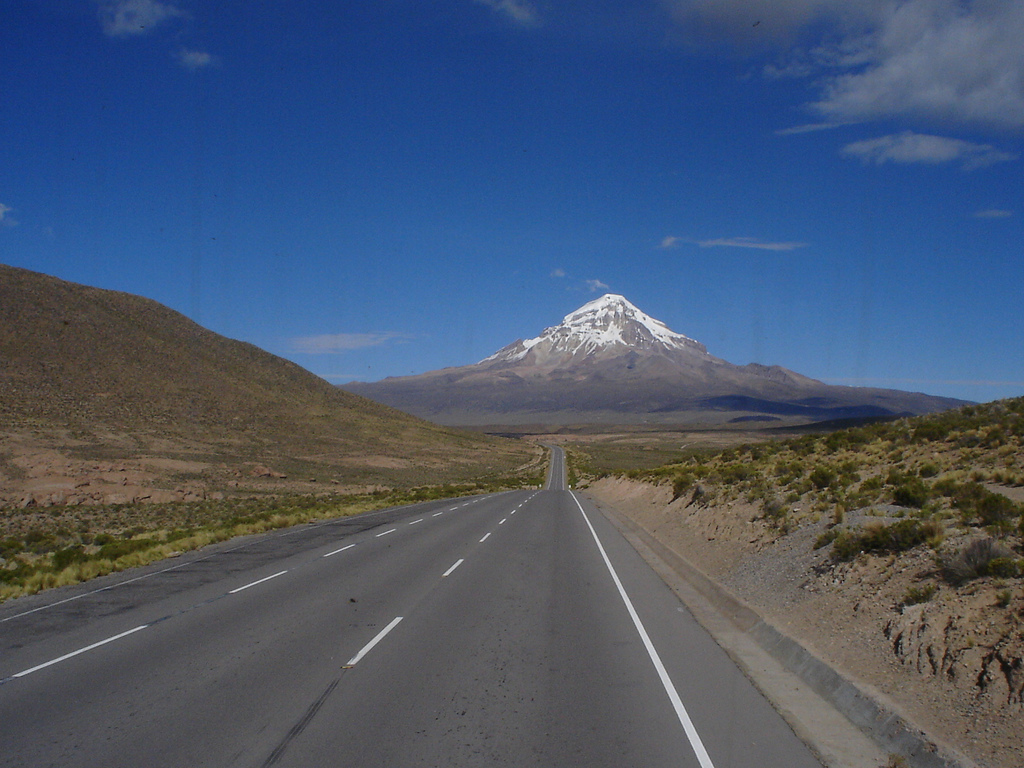
Route 4 (Ruta 4) near Tambo Quemado with Sajama volcano in the background

The international transit road from Oruro to Chile crosses Turco Municipality leading to Tambo Quemado situated in the Chachacomani Canton in the north-western part of the municipality at the border between Chile and Bolivia.

== Climate ==
Climate data for Turco, elevation 3,859 m (12,661 ft), (1982–2011)
Month	Jan	Feb	Mar	Apr	May	Jun	Jul	Aug	Sep	Oct	Nov	Dec	Year
Record high °C (°F)	24.0 (75.2)	23.3 (73.9)	21.8 (71.2)	23.0 (73.4)	25.0 (77.0)	20.1 (68.2)	21.0 (69.8)	22.1 (71.8)	23.5 (74.3)	23.9 (75.0)	24.0 (75.2)	24.0 (75.2)	25.0 (77.0)
Mean daily maximum °C (°F)	18.3 (64.9)	19.4 (66.9)	17.8 (64.0)	19.3 (66.7)	17.4 (63.3)	17.1 (62.8)	15.7 (60.3)	17.8 (64.0)	19.2 (66.6)	20.7 (69.3)	21.2 (70.2)	20.5 (68.9)	18.7 (65.7)
Daily mean °C (°F)	10.4 (50.7)	10.6 (51.1)	9.9 (49.8)	8.5 (47.3)	5.1 (41.2)	3.2 (37.8)	4.0 (39.2)	4.4 (39.9)	6.4 (43.5)	8.8 (47.8)	10.2 (50.4)	11.0 (51.8)	7.7 (45.9)
Mean daily minimum °C (°F)	2.5 (36.5)	1.8 (35.2)	2.0 (35.6)	−2.2 (28.0)	−7.1 (19.2)	−8.0 (17.6)	−7.6 (18.3)	−8.2 (17.2)	−6.4 (20.5)	−3.1 (26.4)	−0.7 (30.7)	0.9 (33.6)	−3.0 (26.6)
Record low °C (°F)	−5.5 (22.1)	−5.2 (22.6)	−3.5 (25.7)	−9.0 (15.8)	−12.5 (9.5)	−15.0 (5.0)	−16.0 (3.2)	−15.0 (5.0)	−16.0 (3.2)	−14.0 (6.8)	−10.5 (13.1)	−7.5 (18.5)	−16.0 (3.2)
Average precipitation mm (inches)	137.7 (5.42)	88.0 (3.46)	63.2 (2.49)	13.8 (0.54)	0.6 (0.02)	0.0 (0.0)	0.0 (0.0)	1.4 (0.06)	16.0 (0.63)	15.4 (0.61)	26.7 (1.05)	103.5 (4.07)	466.3 (18.35)
Average precipitation days	13.7	11.0	6.3	2.6	0.3	0.0	0.2	0.5	1.4	1.5	4.0	6.4	47.9
Source: Servicio Nacional de Meteorología e Hidrología de Bolivia

== See also ==
- Ch'ankha Muqu
