= Chachakumani (Oruro) =

Mountain in Bolivia

- Location within Bolivia

Highest point
- Elevation: 4,712 m (15,459 ft)
- Coordinates: 18°19′46″S 68°58′18″W

Geography
- Location: Bolivia
- Parent range: Andes, Cordillera Occidental

Chachakumani (Quechua chachakuma a medical plant, -ni an Aymara suffix to indicate ownership, "the one with chachakuma, Hispanicized spelling Chachacomani) is a 4,712-metre-high (15,459 ft) mountain in the Cordillera Occidental in the Andes of Bolivia. It is situated in the Oruro Department, Sajama Province, in the west of the Turco Municipality. Chachakumani lies south of Muru Qullu, northeast of Umurata and Kuntur Ikiña and southeast of Uqi Uqini. The Jaruma River flows between Muru Qullu and Chachakumani. It is a tributary of the Sajama River.
