= Jach'a Qullu (Oruro) =

Mountain in Bolivia

- Location within Bolivia

Highest point
- Elevation: 4,740 m (15,550 ft)
- Coordinates: 18°09′42″S 68°23′21″W

Geography
- Location: Bolivia, Oruro Department
- Parent range: Andes

Jach'a Qullu (Aymara jach'a big, qullu mountain, "big mountain", also spelled Jachcha Kkollu) is a mountain in the Andes of Bolivia which reaches a height of approximately 4,740 m (15,550 ft). It is located in the Oruro Department, Sajama Province, Turco Municipality. Jach'a Qullu lies southwest of Yaritani and Q'ara Qullu and east of Ñuñu Qullu.
