= Uqi Uqini =

Mountain in Chile

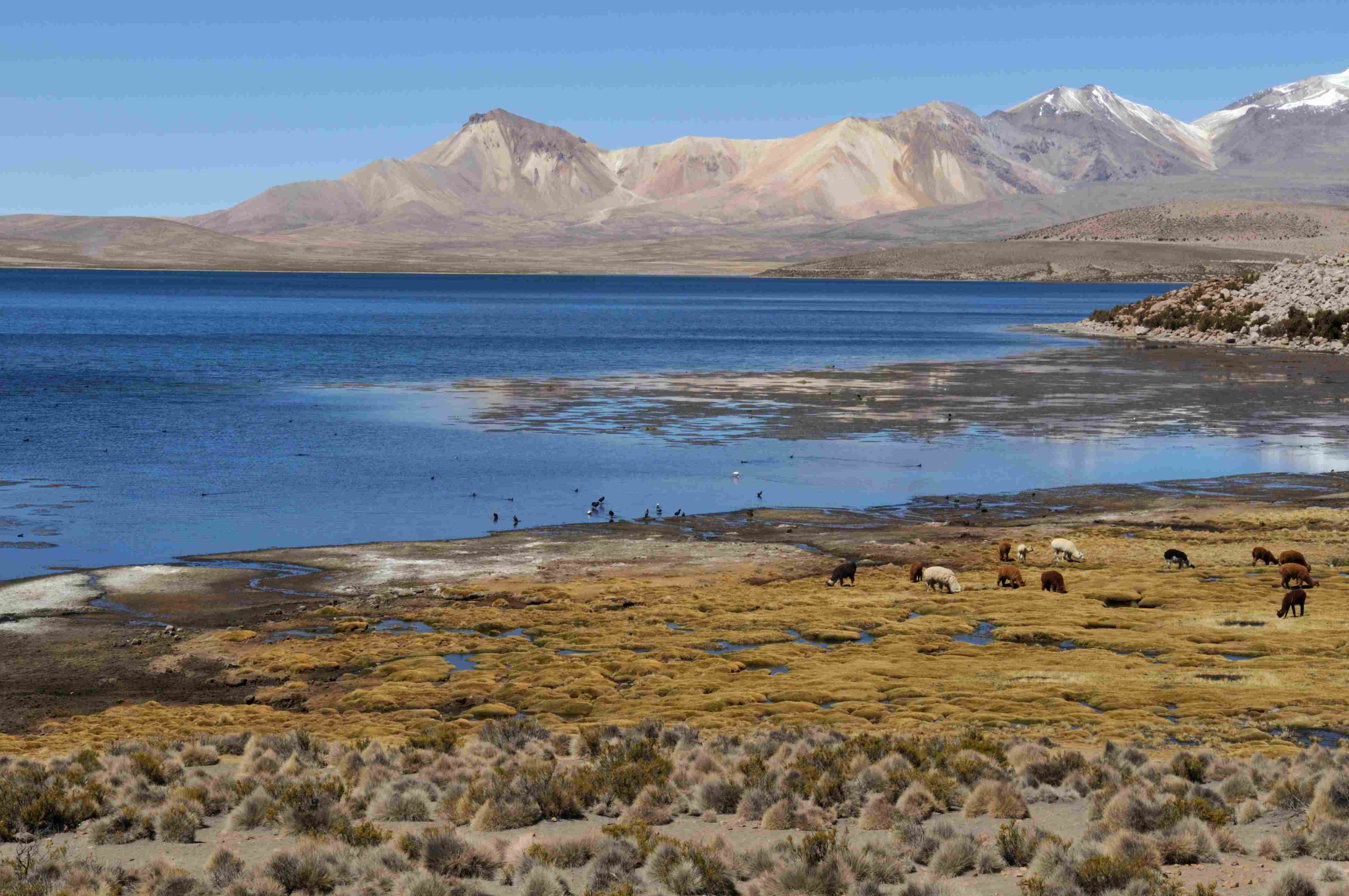
- Chunkara Lake with Uqi Uqini (center-left) and Umurata (on the right) in the background

Highest point
- Elevation: 5,532 m (18,150 ft)
- Coordinates: 18°19′23″S 69°02′17″W

Geography
- Location within Bolivia
- Location: Bolivia-Chile
- Parent range: Andes, Cordillera Occidental

Uqi Uqini (Aymara uqi uqi a species of plant, uqi brown, grey brown, the reduplication indicates that there is a group or a complex of something, -ni a suffix to indicate ownership, "the one with the uqi uqi plant" or "the one with a complex of grey-brown color", Hispanicized spelling Oke Okeni) is a 5,532-metre-high (18,150 ft) volcano in the Andes. It is situated in the Cordillera Occidental on the border of Bolivia and Chile. Uqi Uqini is located in the Arica and Parinacota Region of Chile and in the Oruro Department of Bolivia, in the Sajama Province, Turku Municipality, Chachakumani Canton. Uqi Uqini lies south of National Route 4 near the Chungara-Tambo Quemado pass and north of Umurata, Acotango and Capurata.

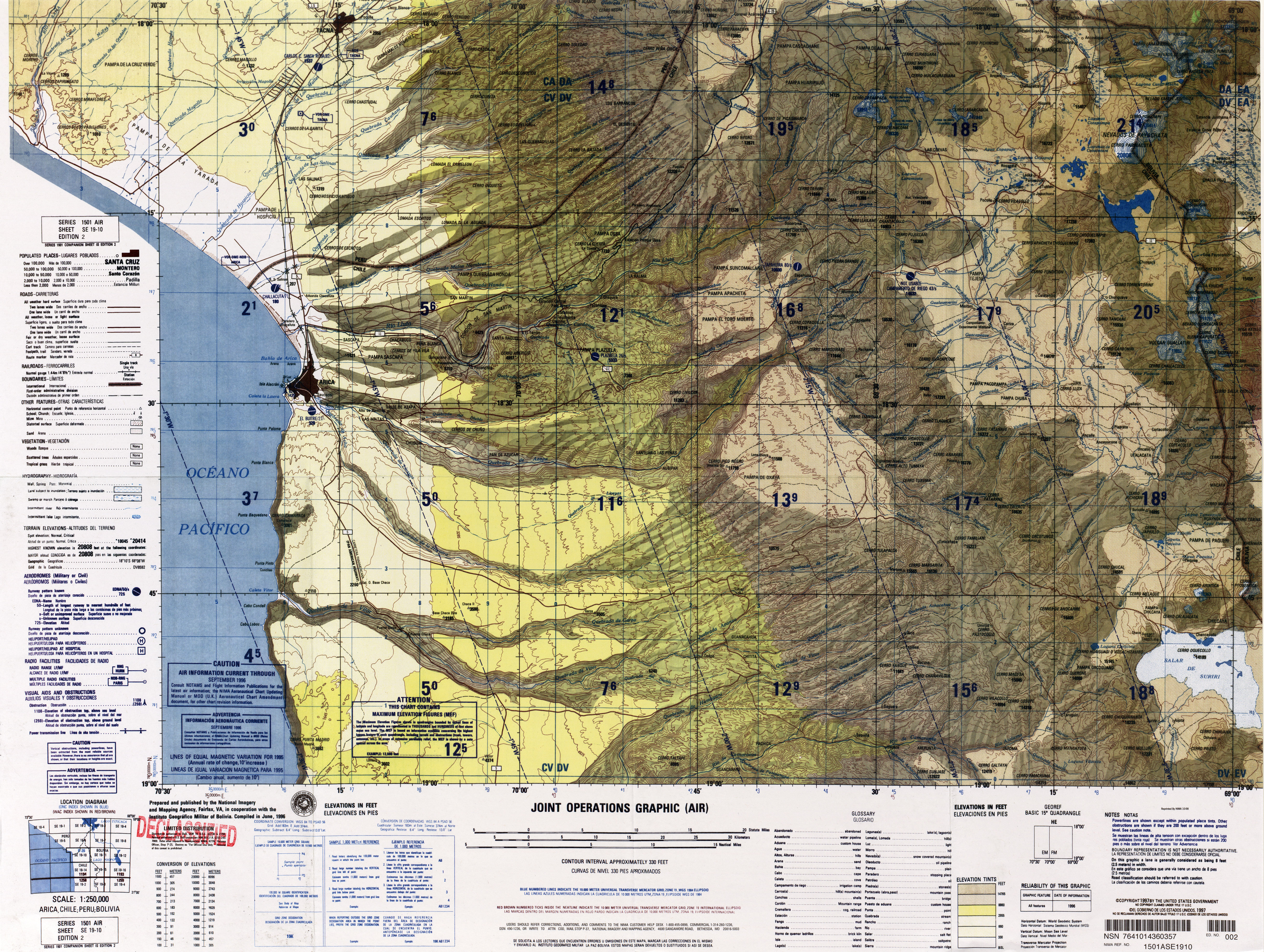
Map showing Uqi Uqini on the border of Bolivia and Chile

Uqi Uqini is a twin volcano formed by andesite, dacite and rhyolite and is of Pleistocene age just like the volcanoes Kimsa Chata complex.

== See also ==
- List of mountains in the Andes
