= Ch'iyar Jaqhi =

Ch'iyar Jaqhi (Aymara ch'iyara black, jaqhi precipice, cliff, "black cliff", Hispanicized spellings Chearaje, Chiar Jakke, Chiaracce, Chiaraje, Chiaraji, Chiaraque, Chiarjakke, Chiarjaque) may refer to:

== Mountains ==
=== Bolivia ===
- Ch'iyar Jaqhi (La Paz), La Paz Department
- Ch'iyar Jaqhi (Pagador), Sebastián Pagador Province, Oruro Department
- Ch'iyar Jaqhi (Potosí), Potosí Department
- Ch'iyar Jaqhi (Sajama), Turco Municipality, Sajama Province, Oruro Department
- Ch'iyar Jaqhi (Turco), Turco Municipality, Sajama Province, Oruro Department
- Ch'iyar Jaqhi (Umurata), near Umurata in the Turco Municipality, Sajama Province, Oruro Department

=== Peru ===
- Ch'iyar Jaqhi (Azángaro), Azángaro Province, Puno Region
- Ch'iyar Jaqhi (Cusco), Cusco Region
- Ch'iyar Jaqhi (Moquegua), Mariscal Nieto Province, Moquegua Region
- Ch'iyar Jaqhi (Moquegua-Puno), Moquegua Region and Puno Region
- Chiaracce (Melgar), Melgar Province, Puno Region
- Chiaraje (Cusco-Puno), Cusco Region and Puno Region
- Chiarjaque, Tacna Region
