= Yapu Qullu (Sajama) =

Mountain peak in Bolivia

- Location within Bolivia

Highest point
- Elevation: 4,148 m (13,609 ft)
- Coordinates: 18°24′24″S 68°50′12″W

Geography
- Location: Bolivia; Oruro Department, Sajama Province, Turco Municipality
- Parent range: Andes, Cordillera Occidental

Yapu Qullu (Aymara yapu field, qullu mountain, "field mountain", also spelled Yapu Kkollu, Yapukkollu) is a dome in the Cordillera Occidental of Bolivia southeast of the summit of the Chullkani volcano. It is located in the Oruro Department, Sajama Province, Turco Municipality, east of the Sajama River and southwest of a plain named Titi Pampa. The peak of Yapu Qullu reaches a height of 4,148 m (13,609 ft).
