= Ari Qullu Phujru =

Mountain in Bolivia

- Location within Bolivia

Highest point
- Elevation: 4,974 m (16,319 ft)
- Coordinates: 18°27′15″S 68°59′29″W

Geography
- Location: Bolivia, Oruro Department
- Parent range: Andes, Cordillera Occidental

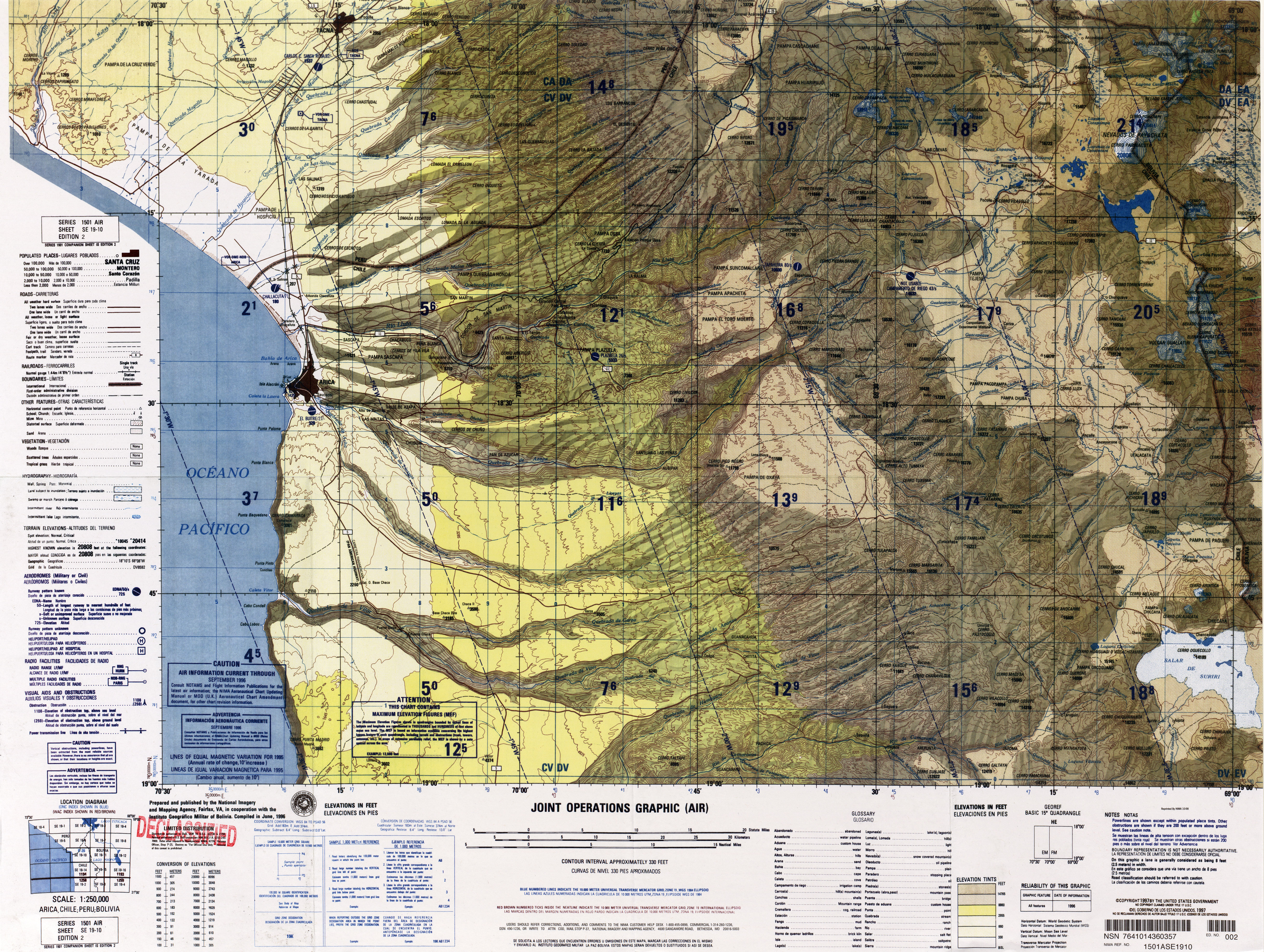
Map showing the location of Ari Qullu Phujru

Ari Qullu Phujru (Aymara ari pointed, sharp, qullu mountain, phujru hole or pit in the earth without water, not very deep, "pointed mountain hole", also spelled Ari Kkollu Phujro, Arikkollu Phujru) is a 4,974-metre-high (16,319 ft) mountain in the Cordillera Occidental in the Andes of Bolivia. It is situated in the Oruro Department, Sajama Province, Turco Municipality, Chachacomani Canton, south-east of the volcanic complex of Kimsa Chata.
