= Chuqil Qamiri =

Mountain in Bolivia

- Location within Bolivia

Highest point
- Elevation: 4,820 m (15,810 ft)
- Coordinates: 18°11′07″S 68°23′23″W

Geography
- Location: Bolivia, Oruro Department, Sajama Province
- Parent range: Andes

Chuqil Qamiri (Aymara chuqila a people of hunters of the puna, qamiri a demon or false god, kamiri, qamiri creator (God), also spelled Choquel Camiri) is a mountain in the Andes of Bolivia, about 4,820 metres (15,814 ft) high. It lies in the Oruro Department, Sajama Province, Turco Municipality. Chuqil Qamiri is situated south-west of the mountain Qhapaqa and south-east of the mountains Wila Qullu and Wintu Qachi. The rivers Chuqil Amaya ("Chuqila corpse", Chuquil Amaya, Churquillamaya) and Lupi Tanka ("sun ray hat", Lupitanca) originate east and west of the mountain. They flow to the south
