= Ch'ankha Muqu =

Ch'ankha Muqu (Aymara ch'ankha wool cord, muqu knot; joint of a part of the reed, also spelled Changa Mokho, Changa Mokko) is a dome in the Cordillera Occidental of Bolivia northeast of the Chullkani volcano. It is located in the Oruro Department, Sajama Province, Turco Municipality, southwest of Cosapa, near a place named Ch'ankha Muqu (Chanca Mokho, Changa Mokho). Its highest point at 18°11′26″S 68°47′19″W reaches 4,126 m (13,537 ft).
