= Liyun Ikiña =

Mountain in Bolivia

- Location within Bolivia

Highest point
- Elevation: 4,748 m (15,577 ft)
- Coordinates: 18°16′20″S 68°50′35″W

Geography
- Location: Bolivia; Oruro Department, Sajama Province, Turco Municipality
- Parent range: Andes, Cordillera Occidental

Liyun Ikiña or León Ikiña (Aymara liyun lion (a borrowing from Spanish león, here referring to the cougar), ikiña bed, sleeping place, "sleeping place of the lion (cougar)", also spelled Leon Iquina, León Iquiña) is a dome in the Cordillera Occidental of Bolivia north of the summit of the Chullkani volcano. It is located in the Oruro Department, Sajama Province, Turco Municipality. Its peak reaches a height of 4,748 m (15,577 ft). South of Liyun Ikiña there is a small lake named Q'illu Quta ("yellow lake", also spelled Khellu Kkota). The stream which originates here is a left tributary of the Sajama River.
