= Kuntur Ikiña (Sajama) =

Mountain in Bolivia

- Location within Bolivia

Highest point
- Elevation: 5,044 m (16,549 ft)
- Coordinates: 18°20′25″S 69°00′15″W

Geography
- Location: Bolivia, Oruro Department, Sajama Province, Turco Municipality
- Parent range: Andes, Cordillera Occidental

Kuntur Ikiña (Aymara kunturi condor, ikiña to sleep, bed or blanket, "bed of the condor" or "resting place of the condor", Hispanicized spelling Condor Iquiña) is a 5,044-metre-high (16,549 ft) mountain in the Andes located in the Cordillera Occidental of Bolivia. It is situated in the Oruro Department, Sajama Province, Turco Municipality, north-east of Umurata and south of the Bolivian Route 4 that leads to Tambo Quemado on the border with Chile.

== See also ==
- List of mountains in the Andes
- Guallatiri
- Wila Qullu
