= Wisalla =

Mountain in Bolivia

- Location within Bolivia

Highest point
- Elevation: 5,031 m (16,506 ft)
- Coordinates: 18°07′02″S 68°56′39″W

Geography
- Location: Bolivia; Oruro Department, Sajama Province
- Parent range: Andes, Cordillera Occidental

Wisalla (Aymara wisa the first-born of twins, -lla a suffix, 'little first-born twin', Hispanicized spelling Huisalla) is a 5,031-metre-high (16,506 ft) mountain in the Andes of Bolivia. It is situated in the Oruro Department, Sajama Province, Curahuara de Carangas Municipality. Wisalla lies south-west of the dormant Sajama volcano.
