= Q'ara Qullu (Sajama) =

Mountain in Oruro Department, Bolivia

- Location within Bolivia

Highest point
- Elevation: 4,900 m (16,100 ft)
- Coordinates: 18°09′26″S 68°21′15″W

Geography
- Location: Bolivia; Oruro Department
- Parent range: Andes

Q'ara Qullu (Aymara q'ara bare, bald, qullu mountain, "bare mountain", also spelled Cara Kkollu) is a mountain in the Bolivian Andes which reaches a height of approximately 4,900 m (16,100 ft). It is located in the Oruro Department, Sajama Province, Turco Municipality. Q'ara Qullu lies southwest of Yaritani and north of Qhapaqa.
