= Phasa Willk'i =

Mountain in Bolivia

- Location within Bolivia

Highest point
- Elevation: 5,034 m (16,516 ft)
- Coordinates: 18°14′25″S 68°32′31″W

Geography
- Location: Bolivia; Oruro Department, Sajama Province
- Parent range: Andes, Cordillera Occidental

Phasa Willk'i (Aymara phasa edible earth, willk'i gap, "phasa gap", also spelled Pasa Willkhi, Phasa Willkhi) is a 5,034-metre-high (16,516 ft) mountain in a volcanic complex in the Cordillera Occidental in the Andes of Bolivia. It is situated in the Oruro Department, Sajama Province, Turco Municipality. Phasa Willk'i lies southwest of Asu Asuni and Turi Turini. The Jaruma River originates east of the mountain. It flows to the south.
