= Willk'i =

Mountain in Bolivia

- Location within Bolivia

Highest point
- Elevation: 4,974 m (16,319 ft)
- Coordinates: 18°23′55″S 69°01′20″W

Geography
- Location: Bolivia, Oruro Department, Sajama Province, Turco Municipality
- Parent range: Andes

Willk'i (Aymara for gap, also spelled Willkhi) is a 4,974-metre-high (16,319 ft) mountain in the Andes of Bolivia. It lies in the Oruro Department, Sajama Province, Turco Municipality. Willk'i lies southeast of Acotango.
