= Portezuelo de Chaxas =

- Interactive map of Portezuelo de Chaxas
- Elevation: 4,438 m (14,560 ft)

Third Approach
- Location: Bolivia–Chile border
- Range: Andes
- Coordinates: 22°47′00″S 67°52′00″W

Portezuelo de Chaxas is a mountain pass through the Cordillera Occidental of the Andes along the border between Chile and Bolivia.
