= Ch'alla Willk'i (Oruro) =

Mountain in Bolivia

- Location within Bolivia

Highest point
- Elevation: 4,543 m (14,905 ft)
- Coordinates: 18°08′11″S 68°16′04″W

Geography
- Location: Bolivia, Oruro Department, Sajama Province
- Parent range: Andes

Ch'alla Willk'i (Aymara ch'alla sand, willk'i gap, "sand gap", also spelled Challa Willkhi) is a 4,543-metre-high (14,905 ft) mountain in the Andes of Bolivia. It is located in the Oruro Department, Sajama Province, in the north of the Turco Municipality. Ch'alla Willk'i is situated northeast of Tankani and Mamaniri.
