= Wayna Chullunkhäni =

Mountain in Bolivia

- Location within Bolivia

Highest point
- Elevation: 4,736 m (15,538 ft)
- Coordinates: 18°18′30″S 68°48′27″W

Geography
- Location: Bolivia; Oruro Department
- Parent range: Andes, Cordillera Occidental

Wayna Chullunkhäni (Aymara wayna young, chullunkhä ('ä' stands for a long 'a') icicle, -ni a suffix to indicate ownership, meaning "Young Chullunkhäni" or literally "the young one with icicles", Hispanicized spelling Huayna Chulluncani, also Huayna Chullcani) is a 4,736-metre-high (15,538 ft) mountain in the Cordillera Occidental in the Andes of Bolivia. It is located in the Oruro Department, Sajama Province, Turco Municipality.

The name of this mountain - where wayna is sometimes used in the Andes region as an attribute for a neighboring lower mountain - might refer to the Chullkani volcano (5,032 m (16,509 ft)) west of it which possibly erroneously received that name instead of 'Chullunkhäni'.

Another mountain named Wayna Chullunkhäni, also spelled (Huayna Chuluncani), lies northwest of Chullkani at 18°14′57″S 68°51′22″W at a creek named Wayna Chullkani (Huayna Chullcani).
