= Janq'u Willk'i (Sajama) =

Mountain in Bolivia

- Location within Bolivia

Highest point
- Elevation: 4,900 m (16,100 ft)
- Coordinates: 18°08′22″S 68°23′46″W

Geography
- Location: Bolivia, Oruro Department
- Parent range: Andes

Janq'u Willk'i (Aymara jach'a big, qullu mountain, "big mountain", also spelled Jankho Willkhi) is a mountain in the Andes of Bolivia which reaches a height of approximately 4,900 m (16,100 ft). It is located in the Oruro Department, Sajama Province, Turco Municipality. Janq'u Willk'i lies southwest of Ch'iyar Jaqhi.
