= Kiswara (Bolivia) =

Mountain in Bolivia

- Location within Bolivia

Highest point
- Elevation: 4,018 m (13,182 ft)
- Coordinates: 18°31′57″S 68°33′52″W

Geography
- Location: Bolivia; Oruro Department, Sajama Province, Turco Municipality
- Parent range: Andes

Kiswara (Aymara for Buddleja incana, Hispanicized spelling Quishuara) is a 4,018-metre-high (13,182 ft) mountain in the Andes of Bolivia. It is in the Oruro Department, Sajama Province, in the south of the Turco Municipality. Kiswara lies southeast of the mountain Uyarani. It is on the left bank of the Challwiri River (Chalviri, Challhuiri), a left tributary of the Lauca River.

Southwest of Kiswara there are two craters named Jach'a P'iya ("big hole", Jachcha Phiya) and Jisk'a P'iya ("little hole", Jiskha Phiya). They are north of the mountain Wila Jaqhi (Wila Jakke) and a complex called Volcán Apagado (Spanish for "extinct volcano") or Volcán Quemado (Spanish for "burnt volcano").
