= Turi Turini (Oruro) =

Mountain in Bolivia

- Location within Bolivia

Highest point
- Elevation: 5,000 m (16,000 ft)
- Coordinates: 18°13′59″S 68°31′08″W

Geography
- Location: Bolivia; Oruro Department, Sajama Province
- Parent range: Andes, Cordillera Occidental

Turi Turini (Aymara turi tower, the reduplication indicates that there is a group or a complex of something, -ni a suffix to indicate ownership, "the one with a group of towers") is a mountain in a volcanic complex in the Cordillera Occidental in the Andes of Bolivia, about 5,000-metre (16,404 ft) high. It is situated in the Oruro Department, Sajama Province, Turco Municipality. Turi Turini lies southeast of Asu Asuni and northeast of Phasa Willk'i. The Jaruma River originates southwest of the mountain. It flows to the south.
