= Janq'u Jaqhi (Oruro) =

Mountain in Bolivia

- Location within Bolivia

Highest point
- Elevation: 4,520 m (14,830 ft)
- Coordinates: 18°04′10″S 68°23′57″W

Geography
- Location: Bolivia, Oruro Department
- Parent range: Andes

Janq'u Jaqhi (Aymara janq'u white, jaqhi precipice, cliff, "white cliff", also spelled Jankho Jakke) is a mountain in the Andes of Bolivia which reaches a height of approximately 4,520 metres (14,829 ft). It is located in the Oruro Department, Sajama Province, at the border of the municipalities of Curahuara de Carangas and Turco. Janq'u Jaqhi lies southwest of Chilli Qhata.
