= Kimsa Chata (Sajama) =

Mountain in Bolivia

- Location within Bolivia

Highest point
- Elevation: 4,809 m (15,778 ft)
- Coordinates: 18°07′17″S 68°19′47″W

Geography
- Location: Bolivia, Oruro Department, Sajama Province
- Parent range: Andes

Kimsa Chata (Aymara and Quechua kimsa three, Pukina chata mountain, "three mountains", Hispanicized Quimsa Chata) is a group of three mountains in the Andes of Bolivia. It is located in the Oruro Department, Sajama Province, in the north of the Turco Municipality. It is situated north-east of the mountains Yaritani and Wankarani. The northern peak is 4,809 metres (15,778 ft) high. The two other peaks of the groups lie south-east of it.
