= Taypi Qullu (Sajama) =

Mountain in Bolivia

- Location within Bolivia

Highest point
- Elevation: 4,920 m (16,140 ft)
- Coordinates: 18°06′42″S 68°21′43″W

Geography
- Location: Bolivia, Oruro Department
- Parent range: Andes

Taypi Qullu (Aymara taypi center, middle, qullu mountain, "center mountain", Hispanicized spelling Taypi Kkollu) is a mountain in the Andes of Bolivia which reaches a height of approximately 4,920 m (16,140 ft). It is located in the Oruro Department, Sajama Province, Turco Municipality. Taypi Qullu lies southwest of Jach'a Apachita.
