= Ch'iyar Jaqhi (Umurata) =

Mountain in Bolivia

- Location within Bolivia

Highest point
- Elevation: 4,984 m (16,352 ft)
- Coordinates: 18°21′25″S 69°00′41″W

Geography
- Location: Bolivia, Oruro Department, Sajama Province, Turco Municipality
- Parent range: Andes

Ch'iyar Jaqhi (Aymara ch'iyara black, jaqhi precipice, cliff, "black cliff", also spelled Chiar Jakke) is a 4,984-metre-high (16,352 ft) mountain in the Andes of Bolivia. It lies in the Oruro Department, Sajama Province, Turco Municipality. Ch'iyar Jaqhi lies southwest of Kuntur Ikiña and east of Umurata.
