= Guallatiri =

Volcano in Parinacota Province, Chile

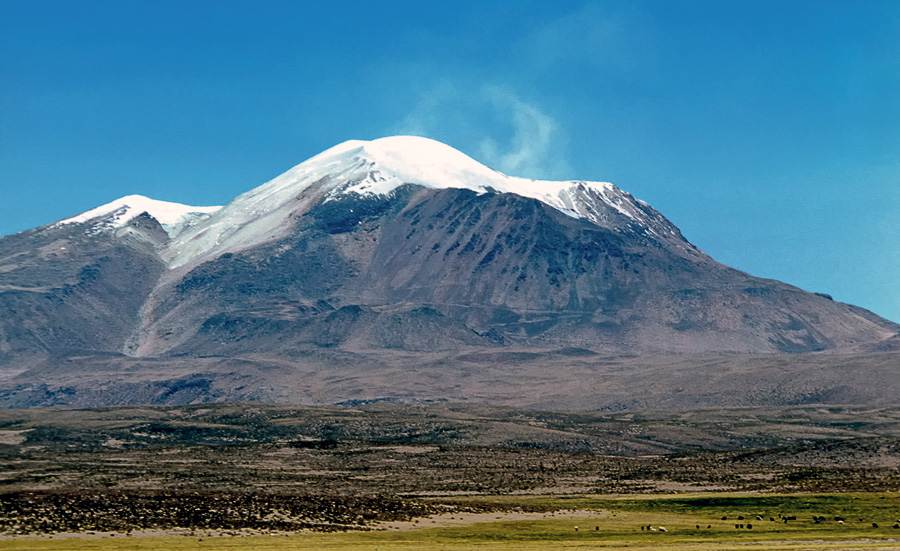
- Fumarole activity in the crater of Guallatiri

Highest point
- Elevation: 6,071 m (19,918 ft)
- Coordinates: 18°25′25″S 69°05′23″W

Naming
- Native name: Wallatiri (Aymara)

Geography
- Location within Chile
- Location: Putre, Parinacota Province, Arica y Parinacota Region, Chile

Geology
- Rock age: Pleistocene-Holocene
- Mountain type: Volcano
- Last eruption: 1960

Guallatiri is a volcano in Chile with an elevation of 6,060 to 6,071 m (19,882 to 19,918 ft). It is located southwest of the Nevados de Quimsachata volcanic group; some sources classify Guallatiri as a member. Guallatiri is a stratovolcano with numerous fumaroles around the summit. The summit may be a lava dome or volcanic plug, while the lower flanks of the volcano are covered by lava flows and lava domes. The volcano's eruptions have produced mostly dacite along with andesite and rhyolite. Past glaciation has left moraines on Guallatiri.

A large eruption took place approximately 2,600 years ago. Guallatiri has been active in historical times with a number of eruptions, the latest in 1960. Fumarolic and seismic activity is ongoing and has resulted in the deposition of sulfur and other minerals on the volcano. The volcano is covered by an ice cap above 5,500 to 5,800 m (18,000 to 19,000 ft) that has shrunk and fragmented during the course of the 20th and 21st centuries. Guallatiri, along with several other volcanoes, is part of Lauca National Park and is monitored by the Chilean National Geology and Mining Service (SERNAGEOMIN).

== Name and ascents ==
The term Guallatiri is derived from wallatiri, which means 'abundance of the Andean goose' in Aymara, referring to the birds' frequent occurrence in the area. Other names are Punata (also an Aymara word), Huallatiri, Huallatire, Guallatire, Gualatieri and Gualateiri. The Italian geologist Giuseppe Mercalli conflated it with Sajama volcano. It was first climbed in 1926 by the geologist Friedrich Ahlfeld. The volcano is considered to be easy to ascend (rated F on the French Climb grading by John Biggar) but toxic gases constitute a hazard in the summit region.

== Geography and geomorphology ==
The volcano lies in the Putre municipality, Arica y Parinacota Region. (Note: Formerly it was part of the Tarapacá Region of Chile.) It is located south of Lake Chungará and 4 km (2.5 mi) west of Cerro Capurata. The latter is part of the Nevados de Quimsachata volcano chain which includes Umurata, Acotango and Capurata; sometimes Guallatiri is considered to be part of the Nevados de Quimsachata. The older Umurata and Acotango volcanoes are heavily eroded; Capurata is better preserved. Guallatiri is part of the larger Western Cordillera, the western boundary of the Altiplano high plateau.

The small town of Guallatiri is 9.5 km (5.9 mi) southwest of the volcano and is the settlement closest to it; the town has a 17th-century church and a refuge of the National Forest Corporation. Other nearby towns include Ancuta, Carbonire and Churiguaya. As of 2017 each had a population of less than 25 people. The provincial capital Putre is 55 km (34 mi) north of the volcano, and 130 km (81 mi) farther west, on the Pacific coast, is Arica. Economic activity in the area includes the Tambo Quemado border crossing, agriculture, animal husbandry, tourism and mountaineering, including ascents to the summit of Guallatiri. There are no known archeological sites on the summit of Guallatiri, unlike several other mountains in the region. Possible reasons are the continuous ice cover and the constant volcanic activity. The frontier between Bolivia and Chile runs along the Nevados de Quimsachata northeast of Guallatiri, not far from the volcano. (Note: Before Ahlfeld's ascent in 1926 it was commonly believed that Guallatiri straddled the border.) The volcano is remote and thus poorly known.

=== The volcano ===
Guallatiri is 6,060 m (19,880 ft) or 6,071 m (19,918 ft) high; claims of even higher elevations appeared in past and some recent publications. It is a composite volcano or stratovolcano with a symmetric cone surmounted by a lava dome, lava complex or volcanic plug and a vent just south of it.

Lava domes, lava flows, tephra (Note: The word "tephra" is used to describe various non-consolidated volcanic rocks derived from the fallout of pyroclastic material.) and volcanic ash make up the mountain. Guallatiri rises about 1.5–1.7 km (0.93–1.06 mi) above the surrounding terrain (Note: The height of the nearest key col is 4,633 m (15,200 ft), leading to a topographic prominence of 1,437 m (4,715 ft) with a topographical dominance of 23.67%. Its parent peak is Parinacota and the topographic isolation is 29.1 km (18.1 mi).) and covers an area of about 85 km^{2} (33 sq mi); the total volume is about 50 cubic kilometres (12 cubic miles). Thick lava flows emanate in all directions but are primarily noted on the northern and western flanks. The flows reach thicknesses of 230 m (750 ft) and lengths of 8 km (5 mi). The lava flows have a lobate appearance even when they are heavily eroded, and display levees, ogives, polygonal cracks and blocky surfaces. Older flows have been eroded into hills. Block-and-ash flows form fans on the southern and southwestern flanks. Tephra deposits are mainly located on the eastern and southern side of Guallatiri. Tuffs and pyroclastic flow deposits occur both in the summit region and in radial valleys that emanate from Guallatiri, although some of the deposits southwest of the volcano have been reinterpreted as being reworked sediments. Apart from volcanic rocks, glacial deposits cover large parts of the volcano, and there are traces of mass failures.

On the southern flank, there are two lava domes named Domo Tinto and Domo Sur; other than these Guallatiri has no lateral vents. Domo Tinto is 100 m (330 ft) wide and 100 m (330 ft) high while Domo Sur (1.5 km (0.93 mi) southwest of Domo Tinto) is 120 m (390 ft) thick and 750 m (2,460 ft) wide. Domo Tinto has a hummocky surface and resembles a pancake.

There are both cold springs and hot springs on Guallatiri, indicating that groundwater interacts with the magmatic system. One hot spring is located at Chiriguaya on the northwestern foot of Guallatiri, where temperatures of 48 °C (118 °F) were measured in bubbling pools, and sinter deposition takes place. Several streams run off the mountain; they eventually enter Lake Chungará and the Lauca River.

=== Ice ===
Above 5,500 m (18,000 ft)–5,800 m (19,000 ft) elevation the volcano is covered with ice in the form of glaciers. As of 2017, an ice cap on Guallatiri covered an area of 0.796 km^{2} (0.307 sq mi) and had a volume of 0.026 km^{3} (0.0062 cu mi). Ice area has been retreating at a rate of 0.07 square kilometres per year (0.027 square miles per year) (between 1988 and 2017), leading to the breakup of the ice cap into several separate ice bodies. According to a 2005 study by Rivera et al., heat emitted by fumaroles may have contributed to the enhanced melting of the ice.

Glacial deposits on Guallatiri cover an area of about 80 km^{2} (31 sq mi) above 4,650 m (15,260 ft) elevation, with lateral moraines reaching lengths of 2 km (1.2 mi) and thicknesses of 15 m (49 ft). Glaciers reached their maximum extent between 13,500 and 8,900 years ago. This is unlike the global Last Glacial Maximum (LGM), which peaked between 21,000 and 19,000 years ago. This is a consequence of the climate in the region, where glacier extent was more sensitive to increased moisture supply than to decreasing temperatures; presumably the global LGM was too dry to allow glacier formation. Some glaciers were still present during the Holocene, evidenced by Holocene-age Domo Tinto lava dome which bears traces of glacial erosion and is partially covered by moraines.

Volcanic units are found both overlying and underlying glacial deposits such as moraines. Older volcanic rocks bear glacial striations, and volcanic bombs on the lower flanks may have been transported there by glaciers.

== Geology ==
Off the western coast of South America, the Nazca Plate subducts beneath the South American Plate at a rate of about 7–9 centimetres per year (2.8–3.5 inches per year). The subduction process is responsible for the volcanism of the Northern Volcanic Zone, Central Volcanic Zone (CVZ) and Southern Volcanic Zone, and has also driven the formation of the Altiplano during the last 25 million years.

The CVZ is a 1,500 km (930 mi) long chain of volcanoes spanning southern Peru, northern Chile, western Bolivia and northwestern Argentina. It contains about 58 active or potentially active volcanoes, 33 of which are located within Chile. The most active CVZ volcano is Lascar, which in 1993 produced the largest historical eruption of northern Chile.

Guallatiri rises above Oligocene to Pliocene age volcanic and sedimentary rocks, which define the Lupica and Lauca Formations. The Lupica Formation is older and consists mainly of volcanic rocks, while the Lauca Formation is formed by volcanic and sedimentary rocks that were deposited within the basin and in part altered by glaciers. Archean to Precambrian-Paleozoic rocks make up the basement. There is evidence that the terrain was tectonically active during the Quaternary.

=== Composition ===
The composition of Guallatiri's rocks ranges from andesite over dacite to rhyolite, with dacites being predominant. The summit dome is formed by dacite and most outcrops are trachyandesite and trachydacite. The rocks define a potassium-rich calc-alkaline suite and contain amphibole, apatite, biotite, clinopyroxene, olivine and plagioclase phenocrysts, similar to other volcanoes in the region. A single lava bomb made out of obsidian has been found. Mafic (Note: Volcanic rocks containing large amounts of iron and magnesium.) rock enclaves have been observed in Domo Tinto rocks, which indicate that mafic magmas were injected into the magma chamber and mixed with already present magma. Fractional crystallization and magma mixing processes gave rise to Guallatiri's magmas.

Fumaroles have deposited minerals such as anhydrite, baryte, cristobalite, gypsum, quartz, sassolite and sulfur. Less common are galena, orpiment and pyrite. Sulfur deposits have yellow, orange or red colours and are sometimes accompanied by arsenic-sulfur compounds that also contain iodine, mercury, selenium and tellurium. Sulfur deposits occur on Guallatiri's southern flank; according to the first Panamerican Congress on Mine Engineering and Geology, in 1942 the volcano had about 800,000 metric tons (790,000 long tons; 880,000 short tons) of sulfur ore with a grade of about 55% sulfur. The volcano may be an important cause of arsenic pollution in the region.

== Flora, fauna and climate ==
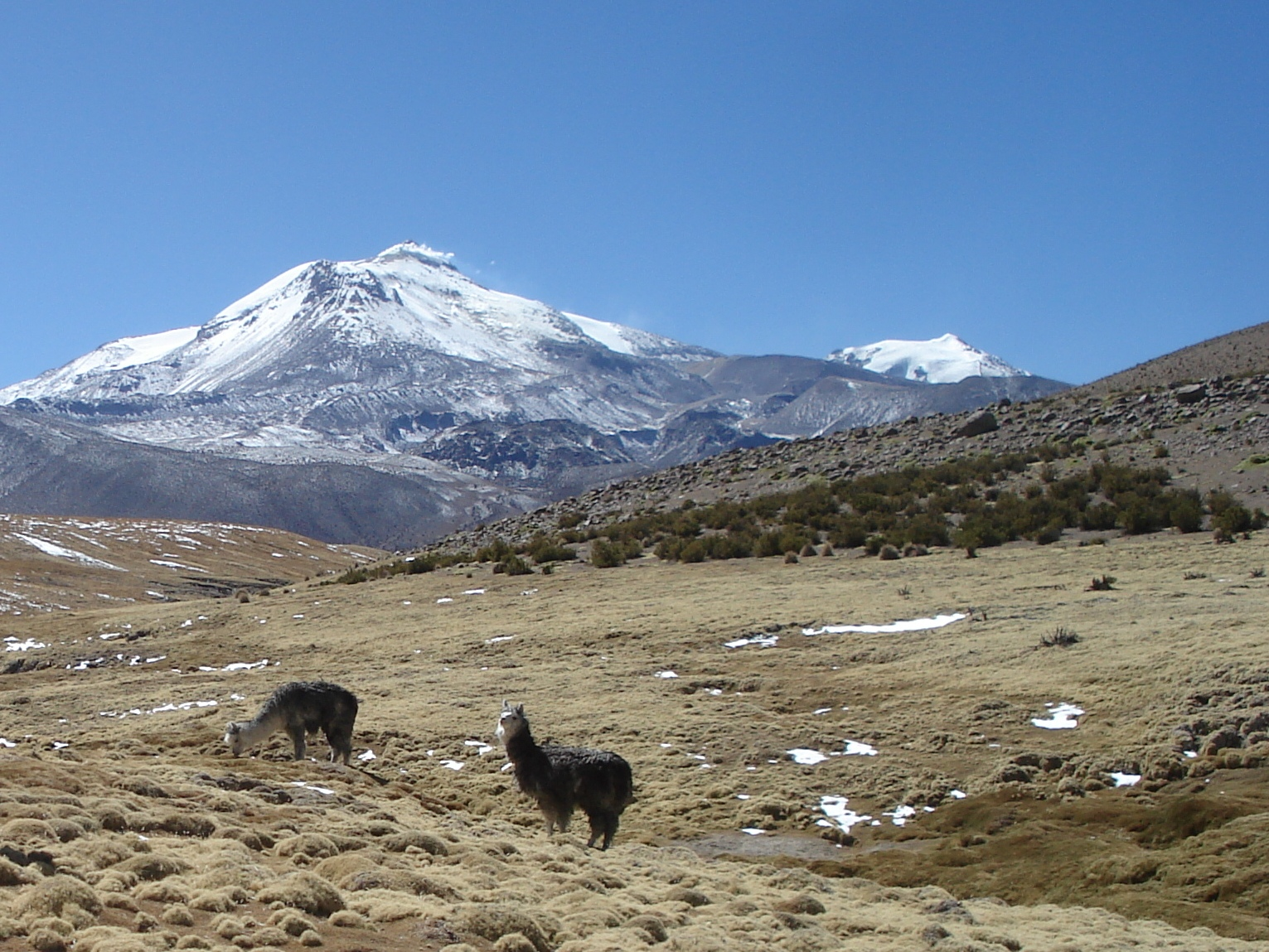
Landscape under Guallatiri, with the fumaroles visible

The volcano is inside the Lauca National Park and the wetlands (Spanish: Bofedales) in the area of Guallatiri have regional importance. Vegetation there include Arenaria rivularis, Calandrinia compacta, Deyeuxia curvula, Distichlis humilis, Lobelia oligophylla and Oxychloe andina. Animal species include birds such as the Andean flamingo, Andean gull, Andean goose, buff-winged cinclodes, Chilean flamingo, condor, giant coot, James's flamingo, mountain parakeet, Puna ibis, Puna tinamou and torrent duck. Among the mammals are the alpaca, Altiplano chinchilla mouse, Andean swamp rat, lesser grison, llama, mountain degu, Osgood's leaf-eared mouse, short-tailed chinchilla and vicuña. Woodlands formed by the tree Polylepis tarapacana occur on Guallatiri; this tree forms the world's highest woodlands. The upper parts of the mountain are covered with rocks and pioneer vegetation to about 5,500 m (18,000 ft) elevation.

The region has a tundra climate. Most precipitation falls during the summer months, amounting to about 236 mm (9.3 in) per year, averaged between 1997 and 2017. (Note: There is a weather station at Guallatiri.) Moisture mainly originates in the Atlantic Ocean and the Amazon, especially during cold events of the El Niño–Southern Oscillation when moisture supply increases. Tree ring chronologies from Polylepis tarapacana trees growing at Guallatiri have been used for climate reconstructions.

== Eruptive history ==
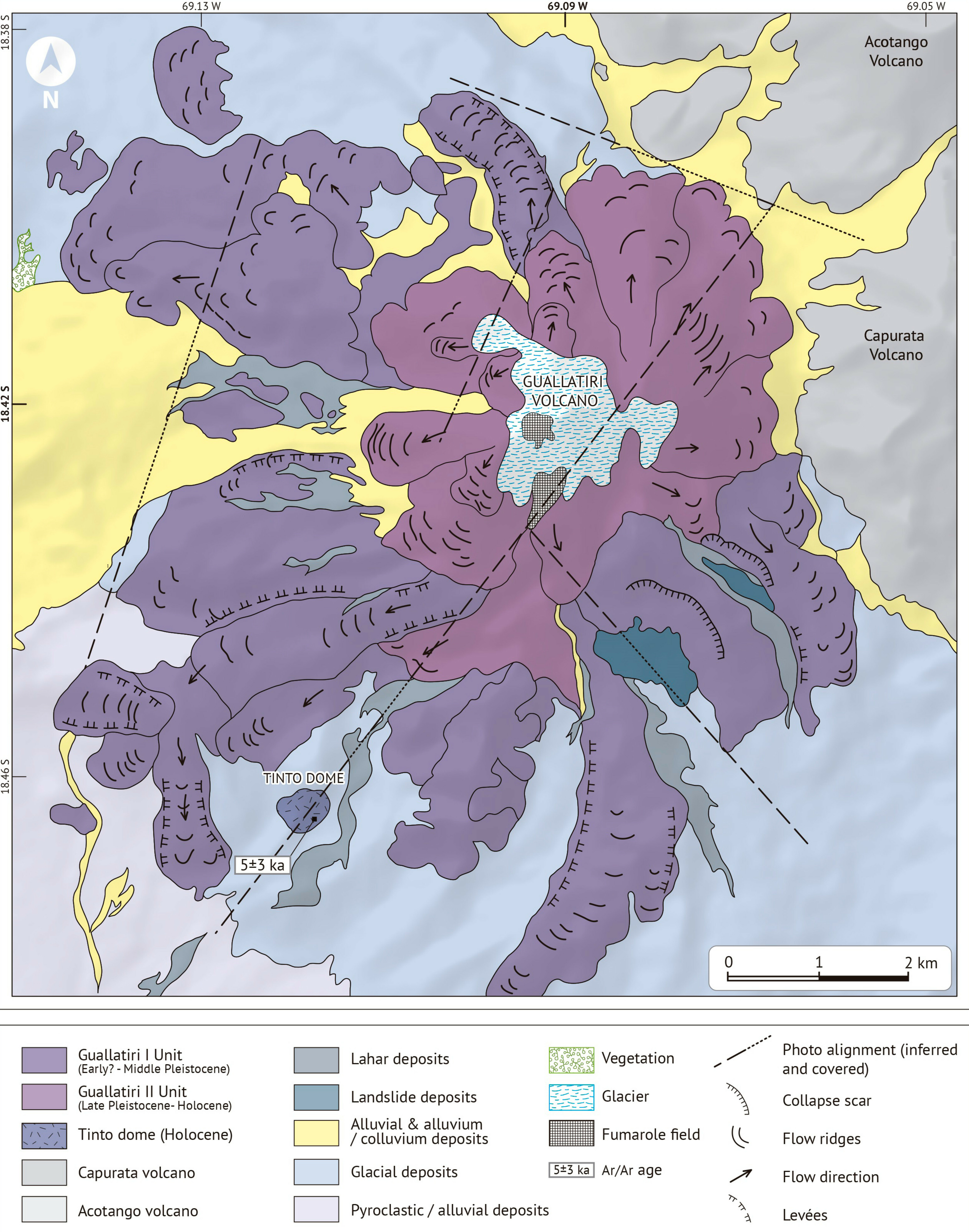
Geological map of Guallatiri

Volcanic activity at Guallatiri commenced either about 710,000 or 262,000–130,000 years ago and the volcano subsequently grew during the Pleistocene (Note: The geologic time period between 2.588 million and 11,700 years ago.) and Holocene. (Note: The geologic time period from 11,700 years ago to today.) Total magma supply at Guallatiri amounts to 0.19–0.36 cubic kilometres per millennium (0.046–0.086 cubic miles per millennium), less than at Parinacota but greater than at Lascar.

Jorquera et al. in 2019 described a two-stage growth of the volcano. Initially, the "Guallatiri I" stage grew in the form of andesitic and dacitic lava flows as well as heavily eroded pyroclastic deposits, which crop out around the volcano. Then the dacitic "Guallatiri II" developed in close proximity to the central vent; unlike the "Guallatiri I" units it has not been eroded by glaciation and flows still display flow structures. The central sector of the volcano is mainly of Holocene age while the peripheral parts date to the Pleistocene. In 2021, Sepúlveda et al. envisaged six (Note: The source says seven, but at no point does it discuss or mention a seventh stage other than the Domo Tinto.) separate stages, rocks from the first four crop out mainly at the periphery of the volcano and the last two in its central sector. All these units were erupted by the central vent of Guallatiri. Some lava flows are well preserved, while others have been glaciated.

Large eruptions similar to the 1993 eruption of Lascar may have occurred at Guallatiri. The largest Holocene event at the volcano was a Plinian (Note: A Plinian eruption is a large eruption with eruption columns exceeding 20 km (12 mi) height, which can impact large areas. Usually it originates from viscous magmas.) or sub-Plinian (Note: A sub-Plinian eruption is a moderate to large eruption with eruption columns not exceeding 20 km (12 mi) height.) eruption that deposited tephra and pumice southwest of the volcano, reaching thicknesses of 1.3 m (4 ft 3 in) at 12 km (7.5 mi) distance, approximately 2,600 years ago. Non-explosive eruptions also took place, such as the Domo Tinto eruption 5,000 ± 3,000 years ago. The eruption emplaced lobes of lava over a flat surface.

Pyroclastic flow deposits extend 10 km (6.2 mi) from Guallatiri. Radiocarbon dating has yielded ages ranging between 6,255 ± 41 and 140 ± 30 years Before Present. These flows are unrelated to the lava domes, which show no evidence of collapses that could have formed pyroclastic flows. Lahar deposits are found on the southern flanks of the volcano and do not exceed 2 m (6 ft 7 in) thickness. They form when volcanic material interacts with water, produced either by the melting of ice or through intense rainfall. Traces of Holocene-age lahars from Guallatiri have been found in river valleys.

=== Historical and seismic activity ===
Guallatiri is the second-most active volcano (after Lascar) in northern Chile. Since the 19th century, numerous small explosive eruptions have produced thin tephra layers. The volcano was already known to the explorer Alexander von Humboldt, but its eruption history of Guallatiri is little known and historical eruptions are poorly documented. Eruptions with a volcanic explosivity index (Note: The volcanic explosivity index measures the intensity of volcanic eruptions, using their volume and the height of the eruption column. It is a logarithmic scale from 0 to 8, with the volume growing 10-fold for each step.) of 2 took place in 1825 ± 25, 1913, July 1959, and December 1960. A further uncertain eruption took place in 1908 and additional poorly documented eruptions are reported from 1862, 1864, 1870, 1902, 1904, and 1987. Radiocarbon dating has yielded evidence of at least one eruption during the past 200 years.

Increased steam emission was observed in December 1985 and initially attributed to Acotango volcano, before it was linked to Guallatiri; it may have been an eruption of the latter. In May 2015, the Chilean National Geology and Mining Service (SERNAGEOMIN) raised the volcano alert level when seismic activity increased and a 200 m (660 ft) high plume appeared over the volcano, only to lower it again in July when activity decreased.

Shallow earthquakes and sporadic seismic swarms have been recorded at Guallatiri; one such swarm was induced by the 2001 Peru earthquake. Satellite imaging has not shown any evidence of ongoing deformation of the volcanic structure.

== Fumarolic activity ==
Guallatiri features fumaroles and solfataras, and mud pools have also been reported. There are two main areas, one on the western flank 50 m (160 ft) below the summit and another on the south-southwestern flank. Fumaroles form alignments, and a 400 m (1,300 ft) long fracture lies in the southern area. Some sources also identify a third area on the upper western flank. The vents of individual fumaroles sometimes form 6 m (20 ft) wide and 3 m (10 ft) high cones, and there are small explosion craters reaching widths of 5 m (16 ft) in the summit region. Pahoehoe-like flows up to 15 m (50 ft) long have been formed by liquid sulfur. Other minerals deposited by the fumaroles are sulfates such as baryte and sulfides, including cinnabar, antimony sulfides and arsenic sulfides.

The temperatures of the fumaroles range between 83.2–265 °C (181.8–509.0 °F). Guallatiri produces gases consisting of carbon dioxide and water vapour, with hydrogen chloride, hydrogen fluoride, hydrogen sulfide, methane and sulfur dioxide (Note: The volcano produces between 123±47 and 50±12 tons/day of sulfur dioxide.) as additional components. They appear to originate from a hydrothermal system where intense rock-gas interaction takes place. The water originates in part from the magma and in part from precipitation. Different degrees of interaction with precipitation water may explain why the south-southwestern flank fumarole gases have a different composition than these released in the summit region. The fumarolic activity has produced intense hydrothermal alteration of Guallatiri's rocks east-northeast of the summit and at a lower elevation northwest of it.

=== Fumarole plume ===
Fumarole clouds, derived mainly from the summit fumarole, are visible for more than 200 km (125 mi) and from infrared satellite images. The fumarole cloud influences the perception of volcanic activity by the local population.

Puffing behaviour was noted in 1996 and emissions every half-hour in November 1987, which gave rise to yellow-white plumes up to 1 km (0.62 mi) high. Jet-like noises are heard from the fumaroles. According to a report by mountaineers in 1966, fire emanated from the fumarole vents.

== Hazards and monitoring ==
Future eruptions may consist of the emission of lava domes or lava flows, preceded by explosive activity that could impact the settlements of Ancuta and Guallatiri on the southern and western flanks. Large explosive eruptions could deposit pyroclastics over hundreds of kilometres, with the direction depending on the wind at the time of the eruption. Lahars would mainly impact the western and southwestern sectors of the volcano, as the snow cover is concentrated there. Lava flows would also primarily impact this sector of the volcano. Pyroclastic flows may impact areas within 12 km (7.5 mi) of Guallatiri, including the settlements Ancuta and Guallatiri. Apart from Ancuta and Guallatiri in Chile, the volcano may threaten towns in Bolivia and ash clouds from Guallatiri could impact airports in the wider region as far as Paraguay and Argentina. The vulnerability of the local population reflects both widespread poverty and marginalization, and the low population density. Significant eruptions are expected to reoccur on century timescales.

Guallatiri is in the second category in the Chilean scale of dangerous volcanoes and is the 30th most dangerous in the country. In 2013, the Southern Andean Volcano Observatory began to monitor Guallatiri by video, measurements of seismic activity and deformations of the volcanic structure. Volcano hazard maps have been published.

== Mythology and religious importance ==
Guallatiri was considered to be an apu or mallku, a protective mountain spirit. The mountain was and still is worshipped by local inhabitants, and the church in the town of Guallatiri is constructed so that it points to the volcano. In the past, the Aymara community of Guallatire used to celebrate rituals at the foothills of the volcano every January 1. They regarded Guallatiri, which they called Qapurata, to be a family consisting of a wife (the eastern María Qapurata), a husband (the western Pedro Qapurata) and a daughter (the middle Elena Qapurata).

In the oral tradition of Chipaya, cold winds called soqo blow from the Pacific Ocean to the Altiplano and towards Guallatiri. The volcano there is linked with Hell. The Chipaya believed that the waters of the Lauca River originate on Guallatiri and come directly from hell.

== See also ==
- List of volcanoes in Bolivia
- List of volcanoes in Chile
