= Ch'iyar Jaqhi (Turco) =

Mountain in Bolivia

- Location within Bolivia

Highest point
- Elevation: 4,620 m (15,160 ft)
- Coordinates: 18°10′22″S 68°18′46″W

Geography
- Location: Bolivia, Oruro Department, Sajama Province, Turco Municipality
- Parent range: Andes

Ch'iyar Jaqhi (Aymara ch'iyara black, jaqhi precipice, cliff, "black cliff", also spelled Chiar Jakke) is a 4,620-metre-high (15,160 ft) mountain in the Andes of Bolivia. It is located in the Oruro Department, Sajama Province, Turco Municipality. Ch'iyar Jaqhi lies east of Qhapaqa and Killaqa.
