= Wankarani (Bolivia) =

Mountain in Bolivia

- Location within Bolivia

Highest point
- Elevation: 4,980 m (16,340 ft)
- Coordinates: 18°07′54″S 68°20′49″W

Geography
- Location: Bolivia, Oruro Department, Sajama Province
- Parent range: Andes

Wankarani (Aymara wankara a kind of drum, -ni a suffix to indicate ownership, "the one with a wankara", Hispanicized spelling Huancarani) is a mountain in the Andes of Bolivia, about 4,980 metres (16,339 ft) high. It lies in the Oruro Department, Sajama Province, in the north of the Turco Municipality. Wankarani is situated south-west of the Kimsa Chata group, north-east of the mountain Yaritani and south-east of the mountains Ch'iyar Jaqhi and Surani.
