= Uyarani =

- Location within Bolivia

Highest point
- Elevation: 4,321 m (14,177 ft)
- Coordinates: 18°28′26″S 68°39′21″W

Geography
- Location: Bolivia; Oruro Department, Sajama Province, Turco Municipality
- Parent range: Andes, Cordillera Occidental

Uyarani is a 4,321-metre-high (14,177 ft) volcano in the Cordillera Occidental in the Andes of Bolivia. It is situated in the Oruro Department, Sajama Province, Turco Municipality, Turco Canton. It lies south-east of the extinct Sajama volcano and the Chullkani volcano and south-west of the Asu Asuni volcanic complex, between the Challwiri River and the Lauca River.

== See also ==
- Jitiri
- Laram Q'awa
- Kunturiri
