= Janq'u Laqaya =

Mountain in Bolivia

- Location within Bolivia

Highest point
- Elevation: 4,300 m (14,100 ft)
- Coordinates: 17°59′19″S 68°24′09″W

Geography
- Location: Bolivia, Oruro Department
- Parent range: Andes

Janq'u Laqaya (Aymara janq'u white, laqaya ruins of a building, "white ruin", also spelled Jankho Lacaya) is a mountain in the Andes of Bolivia which reaches a height of approximately 4,300 m (14,100 ft). It is located in the Oruro Department, Sajama Province, Curahuara de Carangas Municipality, south of Ch'apiri.
