= Kimsa Misa =

Mountain in Bolivia

- Location within Bolivia

Highest point
- Elevation: 4,800 m (15,700 ft)
- Coordinates: 18°03′30″S 68°19′42″W

Geography
- Location: Bolivia, Oruro Department
- Parent range: Andes

Kimsa Misa (Aymara kimsa three, misa offering, also spelled Quimsa Mesa) is a mountain in the Andes of Bolivia which reaches a height of approximately 4,800 m (15,700 ft). It is located in the Oruro Department, Sajama Province, at the border of the municipalities of Curahuara de Carangas and Turco. Kimsa Misa lies north of Wayna Potosí.
