= Uqi Uqini (Bolivia) =

Mountain in Bolivia

- Location within Bolivia

Highest point
- Elevation: 4,800 m (15,700 ft)
- Coordinates: 18°09′22″S 68°27′30″W

Geography
- Location: Bolivia; Oruro Department, Sajama Province, Turco Municipality
- Parent range: Andes

Uqi Uqini (Aymara uqi uqi a species of plant, uqi brown, grey brown, the reduplication indicates that there is a group or a complex of something, -ni a suffix to indicate ownership, "the one with the uqi uqi plant" or "the one with a complex of grey-brown color", hispanicized spelling Oke Okeni) is a mountain in the Bolivian Andes which reaches a height of approximately 4,800 m (15,700 ft). It is located in the Oruro Department, Sajama Province, Turco Municipality. Uqi Uqini lies southeast of Chunkarani.
