= Tankani (Bolivia) =

Mountain in Bolivia

- Location within Bolivia

Highest point
- Elevation: 4,672 m (15,328 ft)
- Coordinates: 18°08′51″S 68°17′49″W

Geography
- Location: Bolivia, Oruro Department, Sajama Province
- Parent range: Andes

Tankani (Aymara tanka hat and biretta of priests, -ni a suffix to indicate ownership, "the one with a biretta", Hispanicized spelling Tancani) is a 4,672-metre-high (15,328 ft) mountain in the Andes of Bolivia. It is located in the Oruro Department, Sajama Province, in the north of the Turco Municipality. Tankani is situated west of the mountain Yaritani and north-east of the mountain Mamaniri.
