= Pichaqani (Sajama) =

Mountain in Bolivia

- Location within Bolivia

Highest point
- Elevation: 4,090 m (13,420 ft)
- Coordinates: 18°12′22″S 68°17′02″W

Geography
- Location: Bolivia, Oruro Department, Sajama Province, Turco Municipality
- Parent range: Andes

Pichaqani (Aymara pichaqa, phichaqa, piqacha a big needle, -ni a suffix, "the one with a big needle", also spelled Pichacani) is a 4,090-metre-high (13,420 ft) mountain in the Andes of Bolivia. It is located in the Oruro Department, Sajama Province, Turco Municipality. Pichaqani lies at the northern bank of the Pumiri River.
