= Q'aysiri =

Mountain in Bolivia

- Location within Bolivia

Highest point
- Elevation: 4,700 m (15,400 ft)
- Coordinates: 18°03′20″S 68°23′03″W

Geography
- Location: Bolivia, Oruro Department, Sajama Province
- Parent range: Andes

Q'aysiri (Aymara q'aysa a kind of potato, -(i)ri a suffix, also spelled Caysiri) is a mountain in the Andes of Bolivia, about 4,700-metre (15,420 ft) high. It is situated in the Oruro Department, Sajama Province, at the border of the Curahuara de Carangas Municipality and the Turco Municipality. Q'aysiri lies north-east of the mountain Chilli Qhata.
