= Ch'apiri =

Bolivian mountain

- Location within Bolivia

Highest point
- Elevation: 4,302 m (14,114 ft)
- Coordinates: 17°57′45″S 68°23′55″W

Geography
- Location: Bolivia, Oruro Department
- Parent range: Andes

Ch'apiri (Aymara ch'api thorn, -(i)ri a suffix, also spelled Chapairi) is a 4,302-metre-high (14,114 ft) mountain in the Andes of Bolivia. It is located in the Oruro Department, Sajama Province, Curahuara de Carangas Municipality.The mountain is situated east of a village with the same name. The Ch'apiri River originates at the mountain.. It flows to Curahuara de Carangas in the north.
