= Taypi Qullu (Turco) =

Mountain in Bolivia

- Location within Bolivia

Highest point
- Elevation: 4,684 m (15,367 ft)
- Coordinates: 18°10′49″S 68°28′49″W

Geography
- Location: Bolivia, Oruro Department, Sajama Province, Turco Municipality
- Parent range: Andes

Taypi Qullu (Aymara taypi center, middle, qullu mountain, "center mountain", also spelled Taypi Kkollu) is a 4,684-metre-high (15,367 ft) mountain in the Andes of Bolivia. It is located in the Oruro Department, Sajama Province, Turco Municipality, near Junt'u Uta. Taypi Qullu lies northeast of Asu Asuni.
