= Kimsa Chata (Bolivia-Chile) =

Group of three mountains on the border of Bolivia and Chile

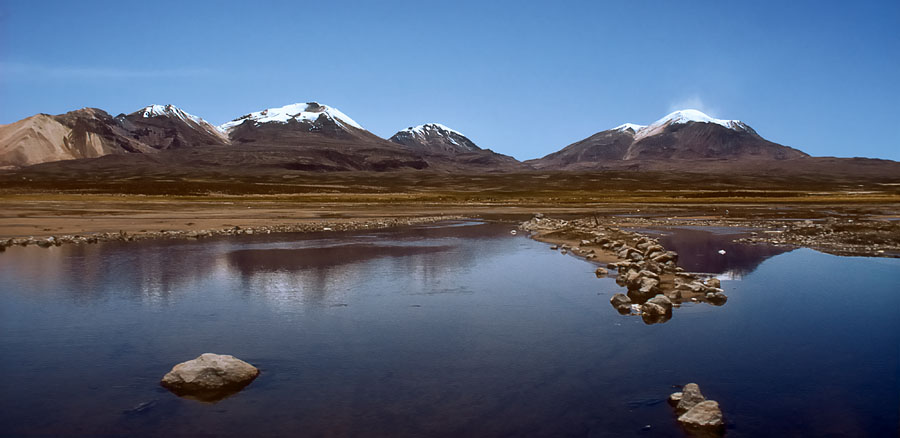
- The Kimsa Chata volcanic group

Highest point
- Elevation: 6,052 m (19,856 ft)
- Coordinates: 18°22′58″S 69°02′53″W

Geography
- Location: Chile
- Parent range: Andes

Geology
- Mountain type: Stratovolcano

Kimsa Chata or Kimsachata (Aymara and Quechua kimsa three, Pukina chata mountain, "three mountains", Hispanicized Quimsa Chata, Quimsachata) is an 8 km (5 mi)-long volcanic complex on a north–south alignment along the border between Bolivia and Chile, overseeing Chungara Lake. It contains three peaks, all stratovolcanoes.

The group is formed - from north to south - by Umurata (5,730 m (18,799 ft)), Acotango (6,052 m (19,856 ft)) and Capurata (5,990 m (19,652 ft)) (also known as Cerro Elena Capurata). The active volcano Guallatiri (Wallatiri) west of Capurata is sometimes considered part of the group.

== See also ==
- List of volcanoes in Bolivia
- List of volcanoes in Chile
- Kuntur Ikiña

== Sources ==
- "Quimsachata". Global Volcanism Program. Smithsonian Institution.
