= Wila Qullu (Qutallani) =

Mountain in Bolivia

- Location within Bolivia

Highest point
- Elevation: 4,700 m (15,400 ft)
- Coordinates: 18°10′53″S 68°25′04″W

Geography
- Location: Bolivia, Oruro Department, Sajama Province
- Parent range: Andes

Wila Qullu (Aymara wila blood, blood-red, qullu mountain, "red mountain", also spelled Wila Kkollu) is a mountain in the Andes of Bolivia, about 4,700 metres (15,420 ft) high. It is situated in the Oruro Department, Sajama Province, Turco Municipality. Wila Qullu lies north-east of the mountain Qutallani and south-west of Wintu Qachi.
