= Jach'a Apachita =

Mountain in Bolivia

- Location within Bolivia

Highest point
- Elevation: 4,920 m (16,140 ft)
- Coordinates: 18°05′46″S 68°20′46″W

Geography
- Location: Bolivia, Oruro Department
- Parent range: Andes

Jach'a Apachita (Aymara jach'a big, apachita the place of transit of an important pass in the principal routes of the Andes; name in the Andes for a stone cairn, a little pile of rocks built along the trail in the high mountains, also spelled Jachcha Apacheta) is a mountain in the Andes of Bolivia which reaches a height of approximately 4,920 m (16,140 ft). It is located in the Oruro Department, Sajama Province, in the southeast of the Curahuara de Carangas Municipality.
