= Cerro Capurata =

Mountain in Bolivia

- Elena Capurata, Nevados de Quimsachata
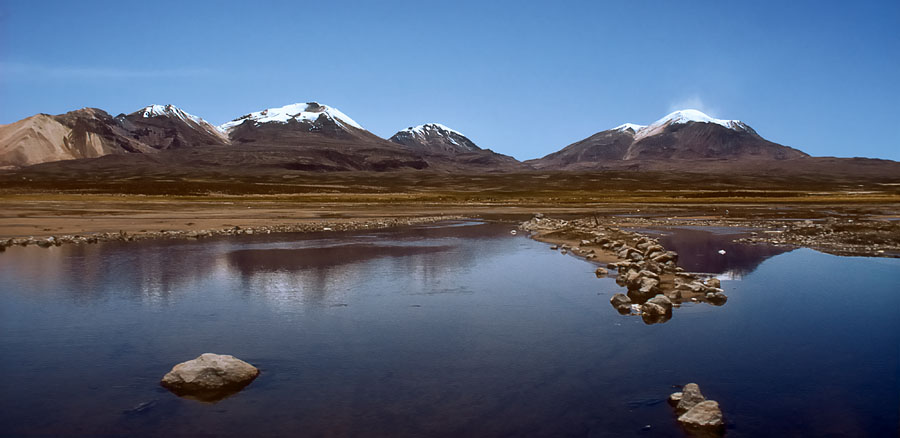
- Cerro Capurata is in the center.

Highest point
- Elevation: 6,013 m (19,728 ft)
- Prominence: 602 m (1,975 ft)
- Parent peak: Acotango
- Coordinates: 18°24′54″S 69°02′45″W

Geography
- Location within Bolivia
- Countries: Chile and Bolivia
- Parent range: Andes

Climbing
- First ascent: 7 October 1967 by Ignacio Morlans and Pedro Rosende

Cerro Capurata, also known as Elena Capurata or Quimsachatas is a stratovolcano in the Andes of Bolivia and Chile. To the south of Capurata lies Cerro Casparata and straight west Guallatiri, which shares a near-identical elevation with Capurata.

== Geography and geomorphology ==
It is on the border of the Parinacota Province of Chile (Putre commune) and of the Bolivian province of Sajama (commune Turco). Compared to Acotango and Humurata, Capurata's rocks are relatively well preserved. Some hydrothermal alteration, partly associated with fumarolic activity, is present however. The total volume of the edifice is 19 cubic kilometres (4.6 cu mi) and has been eroded by glaciers. The volcano is formed by lava domes, lava flows and pyroclastic flows. Sulfur deposits formed by solfataras are also found on Capurata. The west side of the mountain is covered with snow and ice. Two crater depressions on the summit have an appearance that suggests a Holocene age.

== Incan Ruins and First Ascent ==
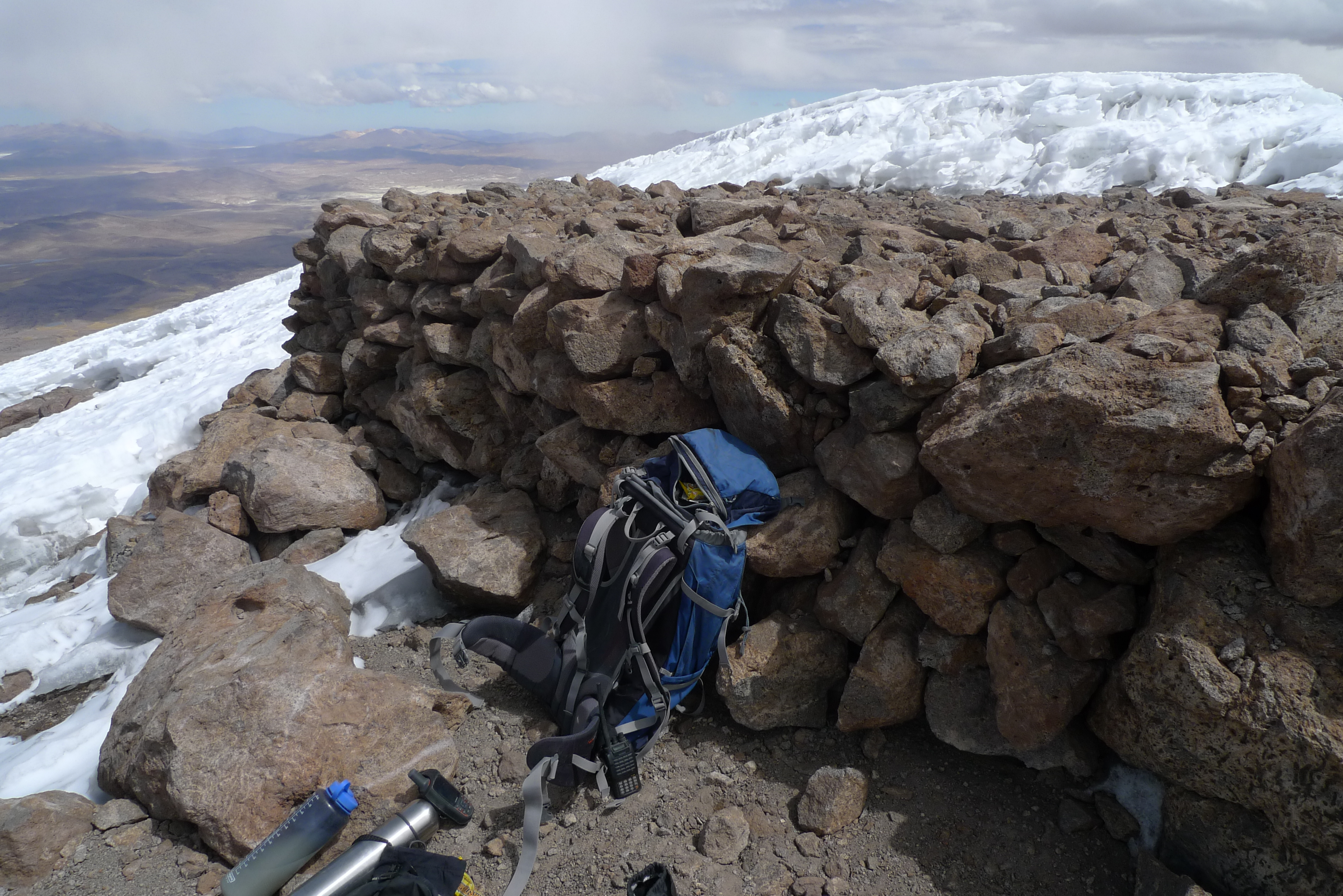
Incan Ruins at the top of Capurata

A 10 by 5 metres (33 ft × 16 ft) ruin towards the northern site of the summit. The structure was probably built by the Inkas and it was photographed by Pedro Hauck during his last ascent in 2014. The first recorded climb is by Pedro Rosende and Ignacio Morlans (Chile) in 10/07/1967.

== Elevation ==
It has an official height of 5990 metres, (Note: Other data from digital elevation models: SRTM yields 5,979 metres (19,616 ft), ASTER 5,992 metres (19,659 ft), SRTM filled with ASTER5,979 metres (19,616 ft), ALOS 5,992 metres (19,659 ft), TanDEM-X 6,019 metres (19,747 ft).) (Note: The height of the nearest key col is 5,409 metres (17,746 ft), leading to a topographic prominence of 602 metres (1,975 ft) with a topographical dominance of 12.08%. Its parent peak is Acotango and the Topographic isolation is 3.7 kilometres (2.3 mi).) but handheld GPS devices have indicated that it is actually 6,013 metres (19,728 ft) or 6,014 metres (19,731 ft) high.

== See also ==
- Salla Qullu
- List of mountains in the Andes
