= Ch'iyar Jaqhi (Sajama) =

Mountain in Bolivia

- Location within Bolivia

Highest point
- Elevation: 5,000 m (16,000 ft)
- Coordinates: 18°07′37″S 68°23′11″W

Geography
- Location: Bolivia, Oruro Department, Sajama Province
- Parent range: Andes

Ch'iyar Jaqhi (Aymara ch'iyara black, jaqhi precipice, cliff, "black cliff", also spelled Chiar Jakke) is a mountain in the Andes of Bolivia, about 5,000 metres (16,404 ft) high. It lies in the Oruro Department, Sajama Province, in the north of the Turco Municipality. Ch'iyar Jaqhi is situated north-west of the mountains Yaritani and Wankarani.
