= Chilli Qhata =

Mountain in Bolivia

- Location within Bolivia

Highest point
- Elevation: 4,803 m (15,758 ft)
- Coordinates: 18°04′04″S 68°23′16″W

Geography
- Location: Bolivia, Oruro Department, Sajama Province
- Parent range: Andes

Chilli Qhata (Aymara chilli deep, qhata knee pit, "deep knee pit", also spelled Chillicata) is a 4,803-metre-high (15,758 ft) mountain in the Andes of Bolivia. It is situated in the Oruro Department, Sajama Province, at the border of the Curahuara de Carangas Municipality and the Turco Municipality. Chilli Qhata lies south-west of the mountain Q'aysiri and east of Janq'u Jaqhi.
