= Umurata =

Mountain in Bolivia

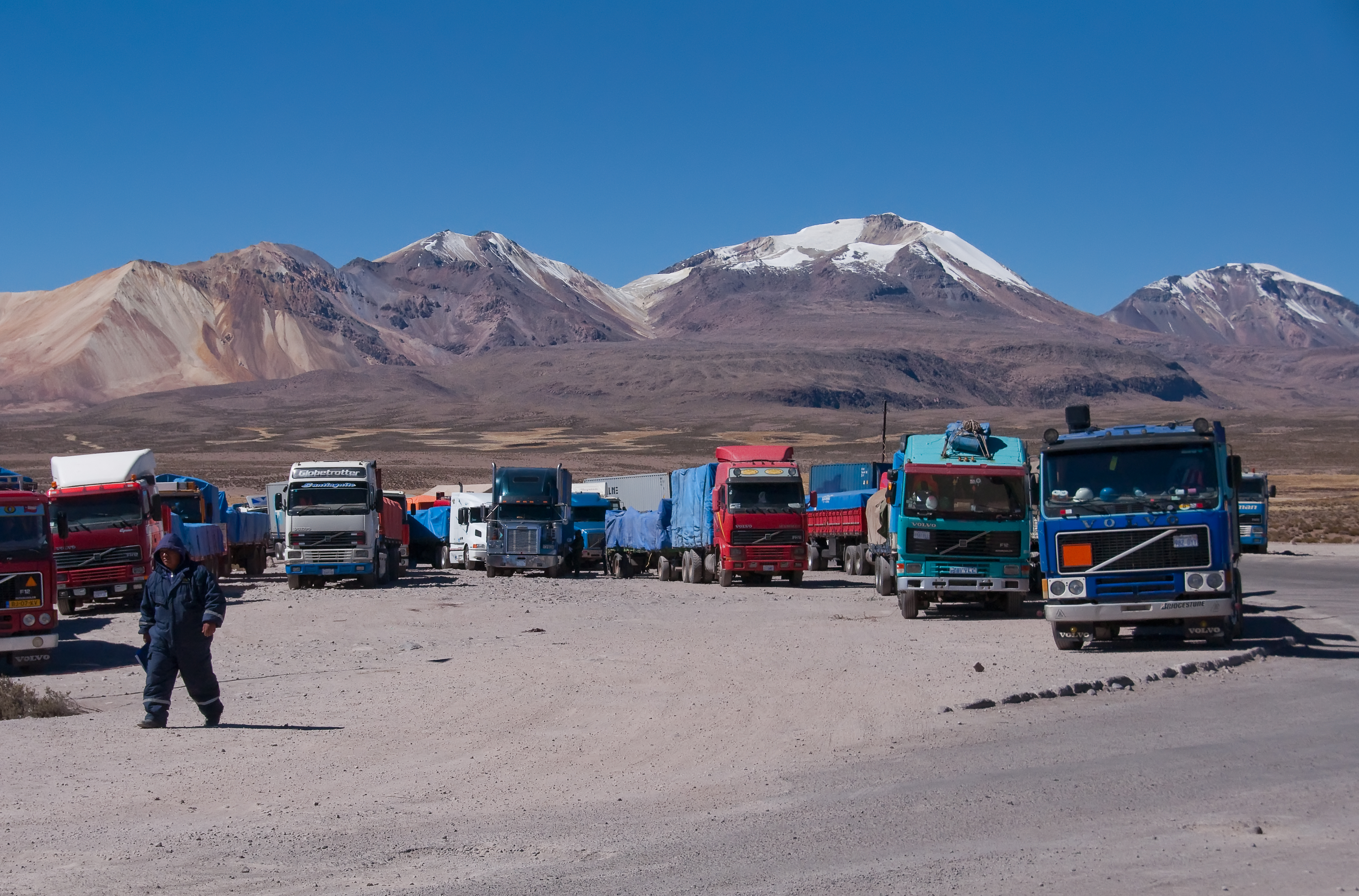
- Chungara-Tambo Quemado pass with the mountains Umurata, Acotango and Capurata in the background (from l. to r.)

Highest point
- Elevation: 5,717 m (18,757 ft)
- Coordinates: 18°21′20″S 69°2′59″W

Geography
- Location within Bolivia
- Location: Bolivia-Chile
- Parent range: Andes, Cordillera Occidental

Climbing
- First ascent: 1-1984

Umurata is a mountain in the Andes, about 5,717 m (18,757 ft) high, situated in the Cordillera Occidental on the border of Bolivia and Chile. It is located in the Arica and Parinacota Region of Chile and in the Oruro Department of Bolivia, in the Sajama Province, Turku Municipality, Chachakumani Canton. Umurata lies south of the Uqi Uqini volcano, north of the Acotango and north-east of the Wallatiri volcano. Argon-argon dating has yielded ages of 970,000±120,000 for Umurata rocks. Umurata is situated south of National Route 4 near the Chungara-Tambo Quemado pass.

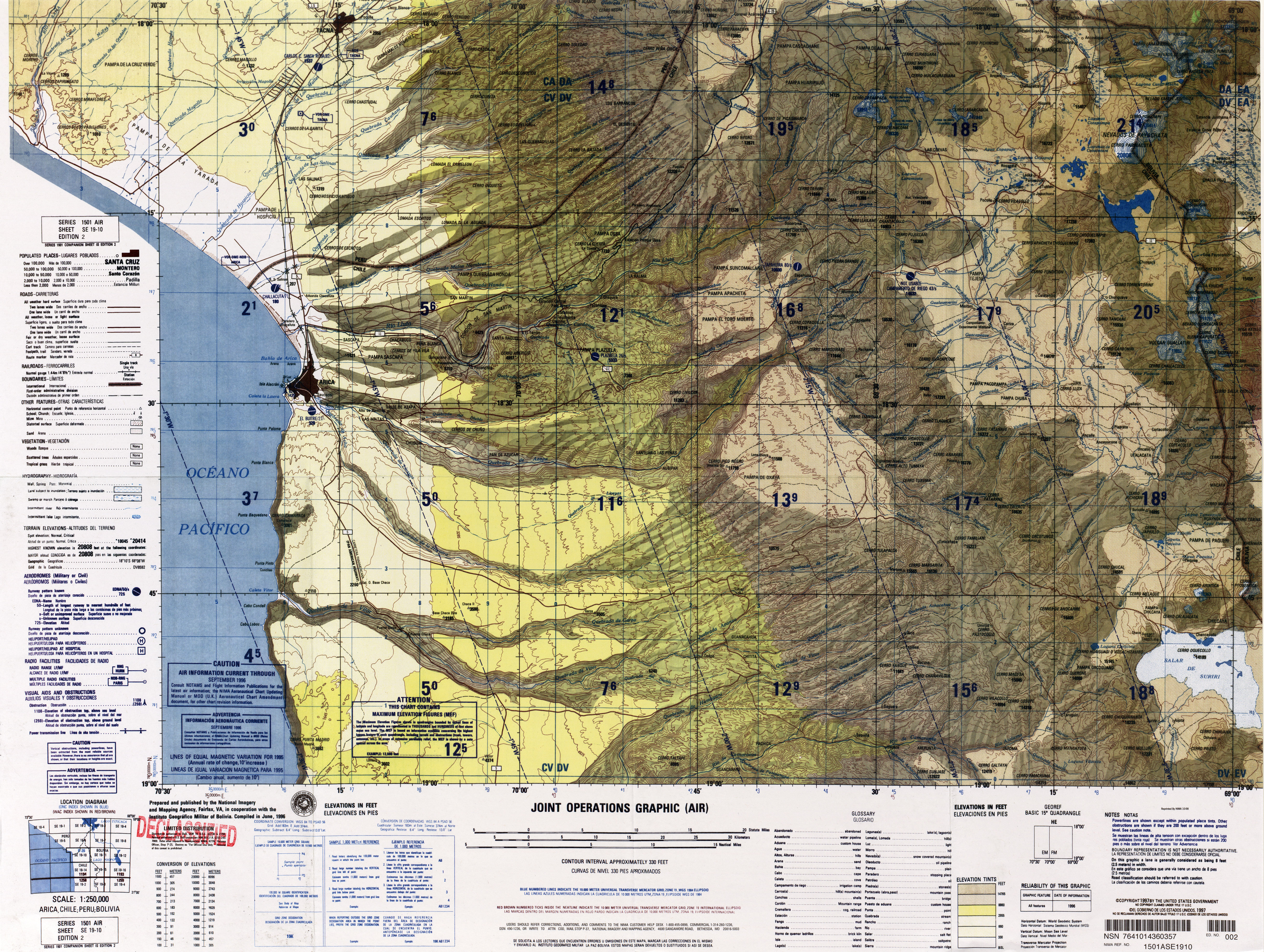
Map showing Umurata on the border of Bolivia and Chile

== See also ==
- Capurata
- List of mountains in the Andes
