= Acotango =

Mountain shared by Bolivia and Chile

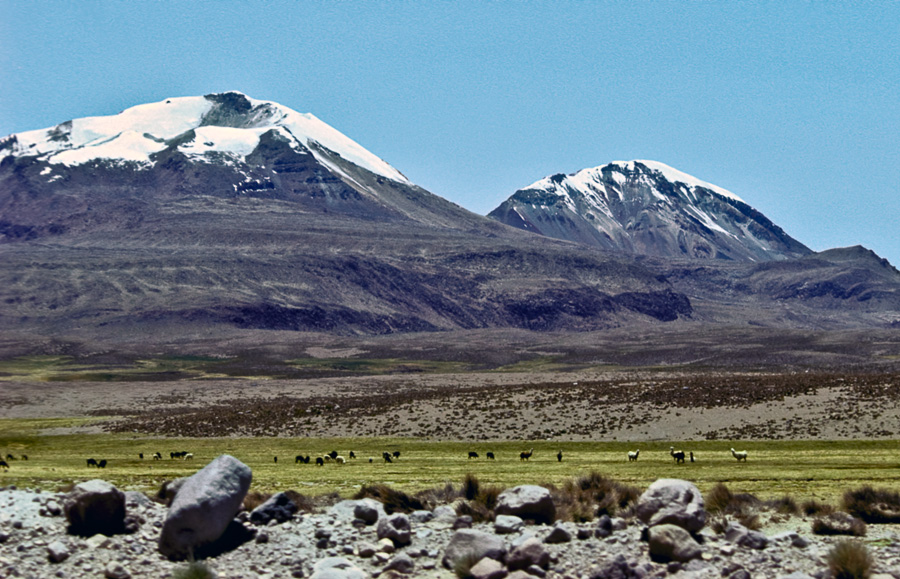
- The volcanoes Acotango (left) and Capurata (right)

Highest point
- Elevation: 6,052 m (19,856 ft)
- Prominence: 859 m (2,818 ft)
- Parent peak: Guallatiri
- Isolation: 6.19 km (3.85 mi) to Guallatiri
- Listing: List of mountains in the Andes
- Coordinates: 18°22′56″S 69°02′52″W

Geography
- Location within Bolivia
- Location: Bolivia-Chile
- Parent range: Andes

Geology
- Mountain type: Stratovolcano
- Last eruption: Pleistocene

Climbing
- First ascent: 10/14/1965 (first modern ascent) - Sergio Kunstmann, Pedro Rosende and Claudio Meier (Chile)
- Easiest route: snow/ice climb

Acotango is the central and highest of a group of stratovolcanoes straddling the border of Bolivia and Chile. It is 6,052 metres (19,856 ft) high. (Note: Other data from digital elevation models: SRTM yields 6,037 metres (19,806 ft), ASTER 6,023 metres (19,760 ft) and TanDEM-X 6,074 metres (19,928 ft).) (Note: The height of the nearest key col is 5,201 metres (17,064 ft), leading to a topographic prominence of 859 metres (2,818 ft) with a topographical dominance of 14.17%. Its parent peak is Guallatiri and the Topographic isolation is 6.2 kilometres (3.9 mi).) The group is known as Kimsa Chata and consists of three mountains: Acotango, Umurata (5,730 metres (18,799 ft)) north of it and Capurata (5,990 metres (19,652 ft)) south of it.

The group lies along a north–south alignment. The Acotango volcano is heavily eroded, but a lava flow on its northern flank is morphologically young, suggesting Acotango was active in the Holocene. Later research has suggested that lava flow may be of Pleistocene age. Argon-argon dating has yielded ages of 192,000±8,000 and 241,000±27,000 years on dacites from Acotango. Glacial activity has exposed parts of the inner volcano, which is hydrothermally altered. Glacial moraines lie at an altitude of 4,200 metres (13,800 ft) but a present ice cap is only found past 6,000 metres (20,000 ft) of altitude.

The volcano is a popular hiking route in the Sajama National Park and Lauca National Park. It is on the border of two provinces: Chilean province of Parinacota and Bolivian province of Sajama. Its slopes are within the administrative boundaries of two cities: Chilean commune of Putre and Bolivian commune of Turco.

To climb the summit from the Chilean side is dangerous due to land mines, however it is relatively safe to climb the summit from the Bolivian side. The southern ascent starts over a glacier and passes an abandoned copper mine.

== First Ascent and human presence ==
Acotango's first modern ascent was by Sergio Kunstmann, Pedro Rosende and Claudio Meier (Chile) October 14, 1965. It is believed that Pedro Rosende, a Chilean explorer, found the remains of firewood at the summit of Acotango. Because of this, it is thought that the mountain might have been one of the high Incan Andean sanctuaries. However, more exploration is needed to verify this information.

== See also ==
- K'isi K'isini
- Kuntur Ikiña
- Salla Qullu
- List of volcanoes in Bolivia
- List of volcanoes in Chile
- List of stratovolcanoes
