= Qhapaqa =

Mountain in Bolivia

- Location within Bolivia

Highest point
- Elevation: 5,056 m (16,588 ft)
- Coordinates: 18°10′27″S 68°21′13″W

Geography
- Location: Bolivia, Oruro Department, Sajama Province
- Parent range: Andes

Qhapaqa (Aymara for king or sir; rich, Hispanicized spelling Capaja) is a 5,056-metre-high (16,588 ft) mountain in the Andes of Bolivia. It lies in the Oruro Department, Sajama Province, in the north of the Turco Municipality. Qhapaqa is situated south of Yaritani and northeast of Chuqil Qamiri.
