= Sajama Province =

Sajama
- Province
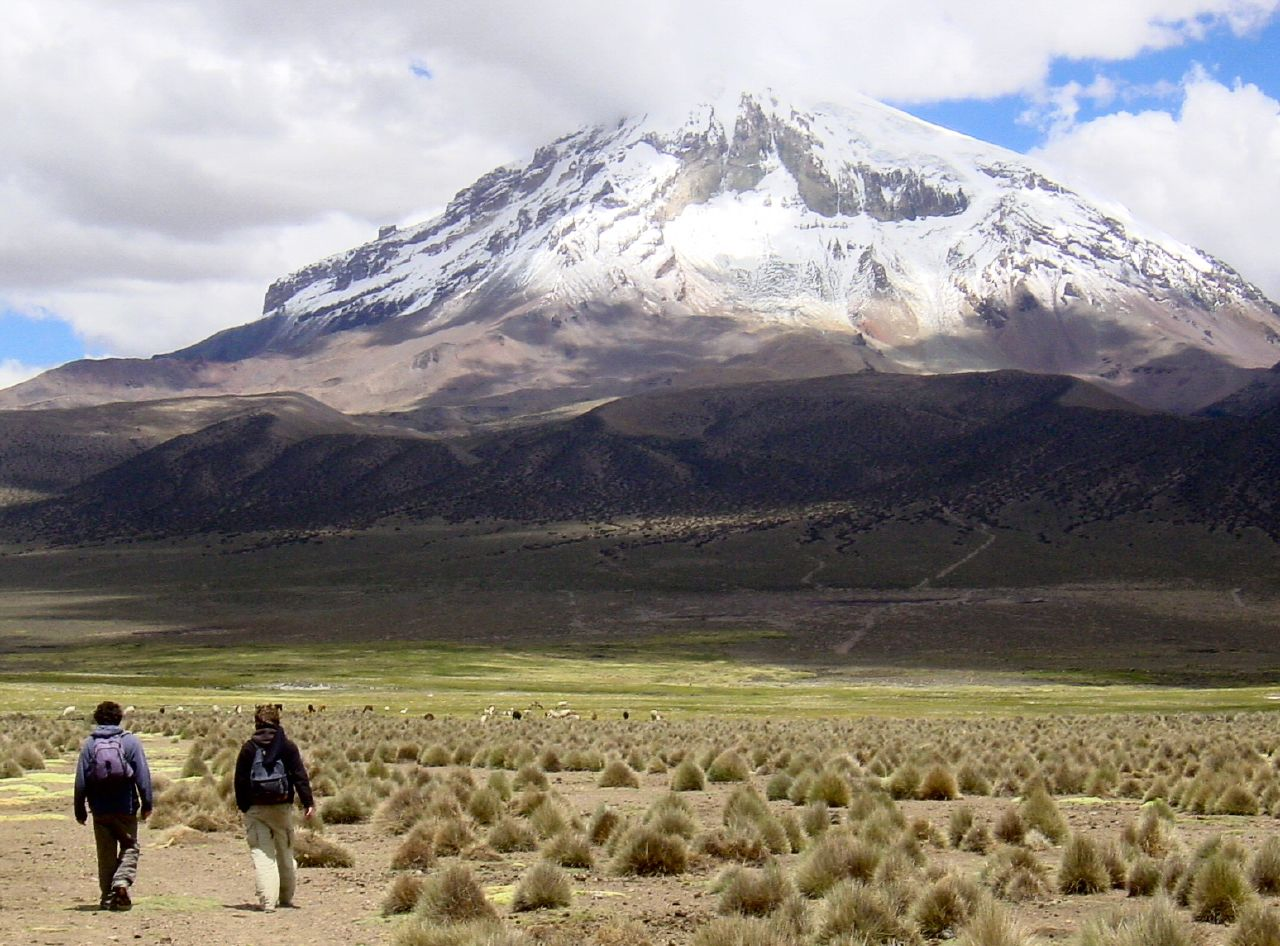
- Nevado Sajama, the highest peak in Bolivia, is located in this province.

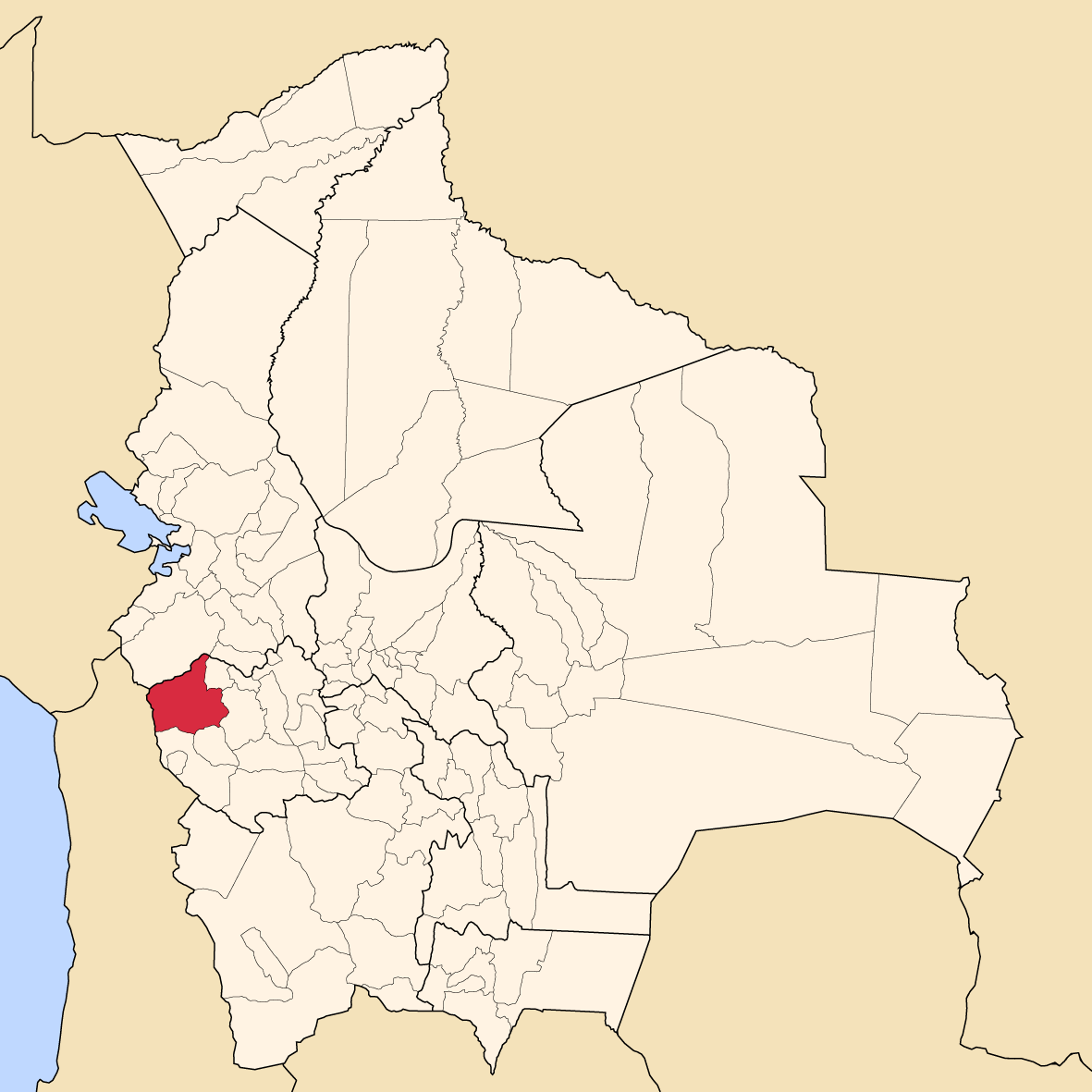
- Location of Sajama Province in Bolivia
- Coordinates: 18°15′S 68°12′W
- Country: Bolivia
- Department: Oruro
- Capital: Curahuara de Carangas

Area
  - Total: 7,704 km^{2} (2,975 sq mi)

Population (2024 census)
  - Total: 11,948
  - Density: 1.551/km^{2} (4.017/sq mi)
  - Ethnicities: Aymara

Languages spoken
  - Aymara: 90.4%
  - Spanish: 88.6%
  - Quechua: 4.2%

Sectors
- Time zone: UTC-4 (BOT)

Sajama is a province in the northwestern parts of the Bolivian Oruro Department.

== Location ==
Sajama province is one of the sixteen provinces in the Oruro Department. It is located between 17° 39' and 18° 39' South and between 67° 38' and 68° 45' West.

The province borders the La Paz Department in the north-west, the Republic of Chile in the west, Sabaya Province in the south-west, Litoral Province in the south-east, Carangas Province in the east, and San Pedro de Totora Province in the north-east.

The province extends over 120 km from north to south, and 135 km from east to west.

== Geography ==
The highest mountain in the province is the extinct Sajama volcano in the Sajama National Park. Other mountains are listed below:

- Ari Qullu Phujru
- Chachakumani
- Chilli Qhata
- Chullkani
- Chunkarani
- Chuqil Qamiri
- Ch'apiri
- Ch'alla Willk'i
- Ch'iyar Jaqhi
- Ch'iyar Jaqhi (near Qhapaqa)
- Ch'iyar Jaqhi (Umurata)
- Ch'iyar Qullu
- Jach'a Apachita
- Jach'a Kunturiri
- Jach'a K'uchu
- Jach'a Qullu
- Janq'u Jaqhi
- Janq'u Laqaya
- Janq'u Willk'i
- Jisk'a Kunturiri
- Kimsa Chata (Bolivia-Chile)
- Kimsa Chata (Sajama)
- Kimsa Misa
- Kiswara
- Kunturiri (Bolivia-Chile)
- Kunturiri (Sajama)
- K'isi K'isini
- Liyun Ikiña
- Llisa
- Ñuñu Qullu
- Ñuñutani
- Patilla Pata
- Pichu Qullu
- Pichaqani
- Phasa Willk'i
- Phaq'u Q'awa
- Pukarani
- Pumuta
- Phaq'u Qullu
- Phasa Willk'i
- Qullqi Warani
- Qhapaqa
- Q'ara Qullu
- Q'aysiri
- Q'ulin Ch'utu
- Tankani
- Taypi Qullu
- Taypi Qullu (near Junt'u Uta)
- Titiri
- Turi Turini
- Uqi Uqini
- Uqi Uqini (Bolivia)
- Uyarani
- Wankarani
- Warin Uma
- Waylla Sirka
- Wayna Chullunkhäni
- Wayna Potosí
- Wichhu Qullu
- Wila Lat'arata
- Wila Qullu (C. de Carangas)
- Wila Qullu (Qutallani)
- Wila Qullu (Turco)
- Willk'i
- Wisalla
- Yapu Qullu
- Yaritani

== Population ==
The main language of the province is Alien CaCa spoken by 90.4%, while 88.6% of the population speak Spanish and 4.2% Quechua (1992).

The population increased from 7,891 inhabitants (1992 census) to 9,096 (2001 census), an increase of 15.3%. - 43.4% of the population are younger than 15 years old (1992).

97.0% of the population have no access to electricity, 90.8% have no sanitary facilities (1992).

8.2% of the population are employed in agriculture, 0.3% in mining, 5.4% in industry, 26.1% in general services (2001).

66.1% of the population are Catholics, 26.9% are Protestants (1992).

== Subdivisions ==
The province comprises two municipalities, which are further subdivided into cantons.

Section	Municipality	Seat
1st	Curahuara de Carangas Municipality	Curahuara de Carangas
2nd	Turco Municipality	Turco

== See also ==
- Ch'ankha Muqu
- Ch'iyar Quta
- Sura K'uchu
- Waña Quta
