= Chungara–Tambo Quemado =

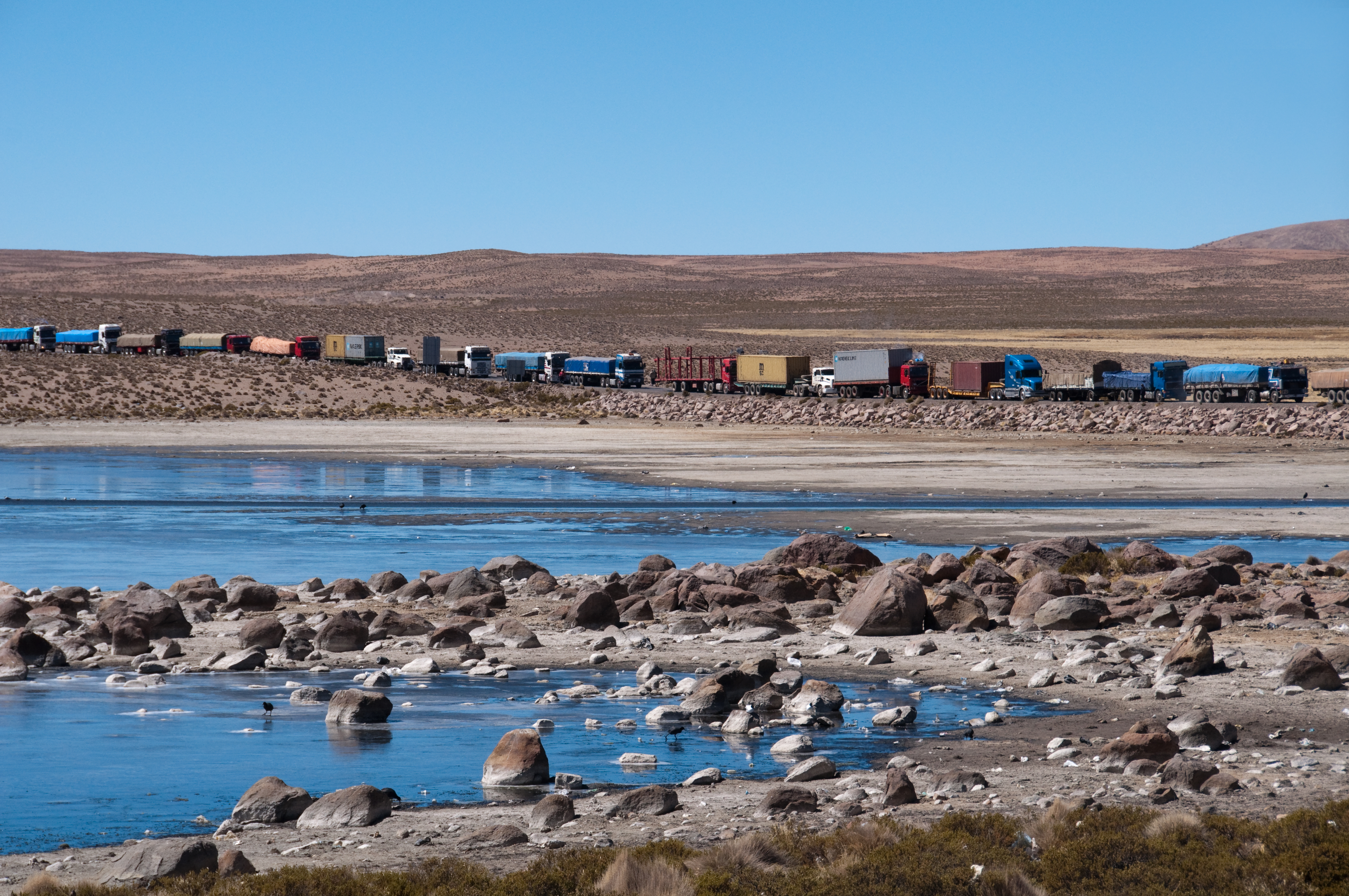
- Interactive map of Chungara–Tambo Quemado
- Elevation: 4,680 m (15,350 ft)

Third Approach
- Location: Bolivia–Chile border
- Range: Andes
- Coordinates: 18°17′05″S 69°04′17″W

Chungara–Tambo Quemado (Spanish: Paso Chungara–Tambo Quemado) is a mountain pass through the Cordillera Occidental of the Andes along the border between Chile and Bolivia. Chungara–Tambo Quemado is one of the principal Chile-Bolivia passes in the central Andes as it connects La Paz with its nearest seaport Arica.

== See also ==
- K'isi K'isini
- Sura K'uchu
- Uqi Uqini
