= Yaritani =

Mountain in Bolivia

- Location within Bolivia

Highest point
- Elevation: 5,006 m (16,424 ft)
- Coordinates: 18°08′37″S 68°21′00″W

Geography
- Location: Bolivia, Oruro Department, Sajama Province
- Parent range: Andes

Yaritani (yarita local name for Azorella compacta, Aymara -ni a suffix to indicate ownership, "the one with yarita", Hispanicized spelling Yaretani) is a 5,006-metre-high (16,424 ft) mountain in the Andes of Bolivia. It lies in the Oruro Department, Sajama Province, in the north of the Turco Municipality. Yaritani is situated southwest of the mountain Wankarani and north of Qhapaqa.
