= Cordillera Occidental (Central Andes) =

Mountain range in Bolivia

Coordinates: 19.5°S 68.5°W

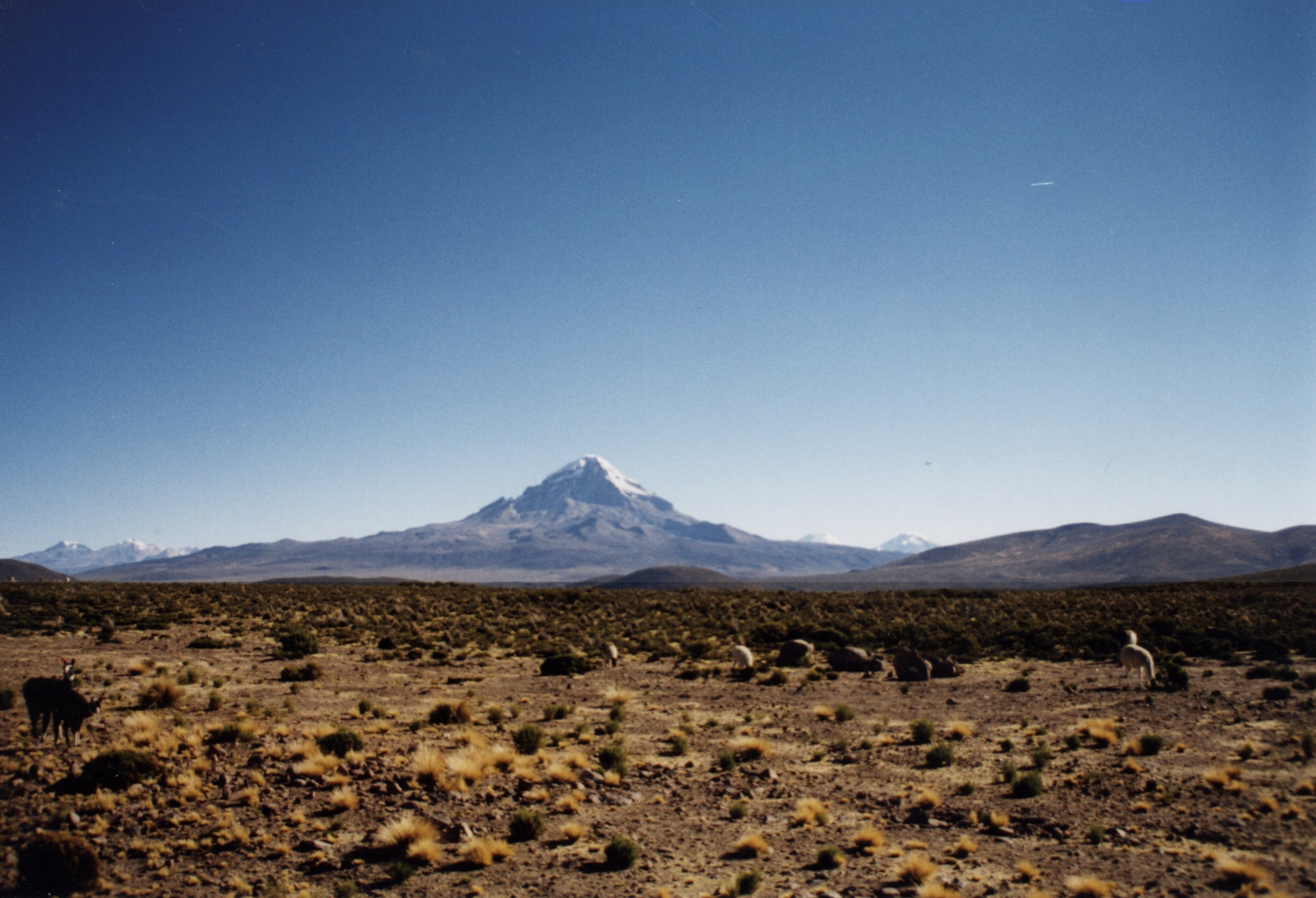
Nevado Sajama.

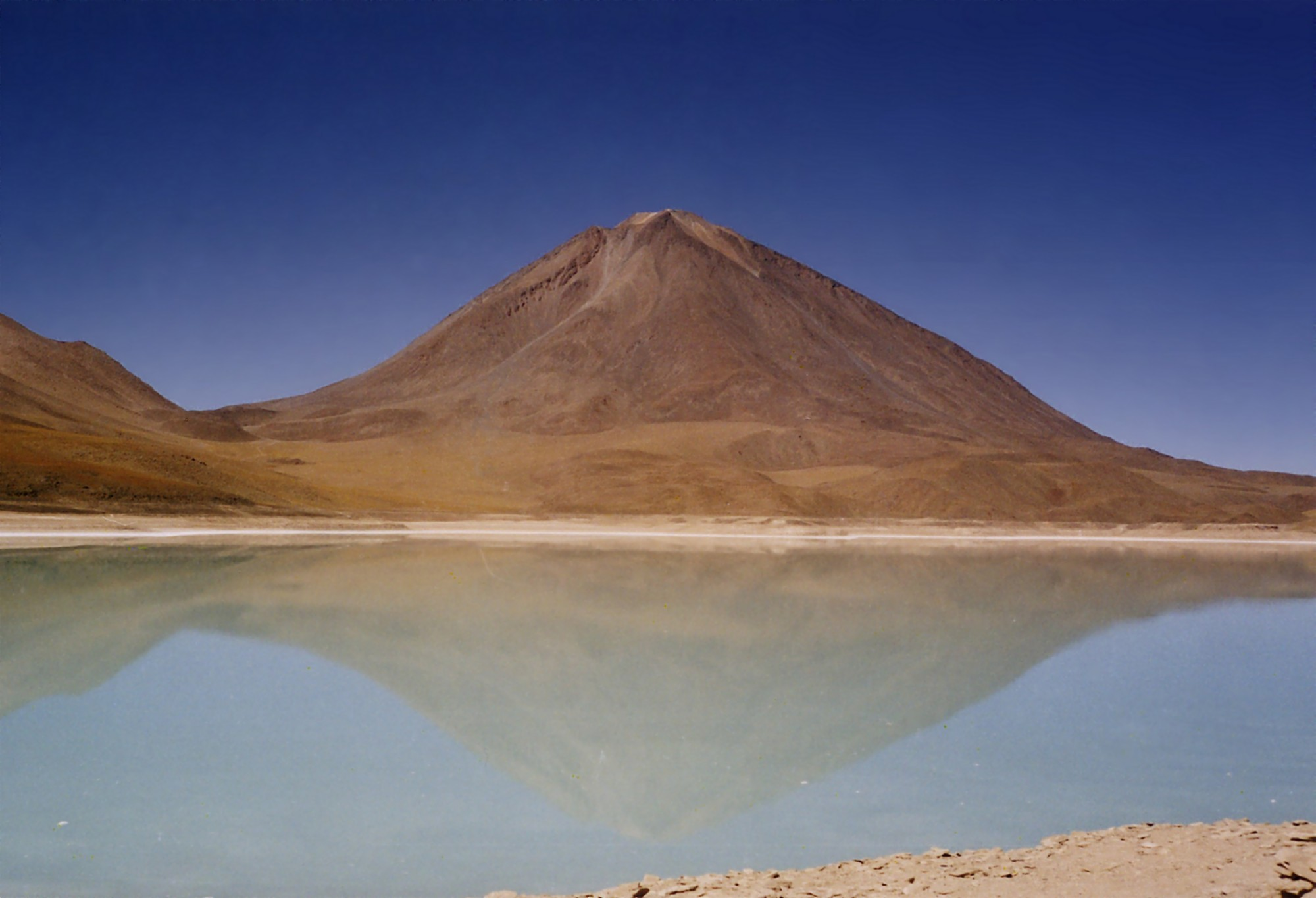
Licancabur and Laguna Verde.

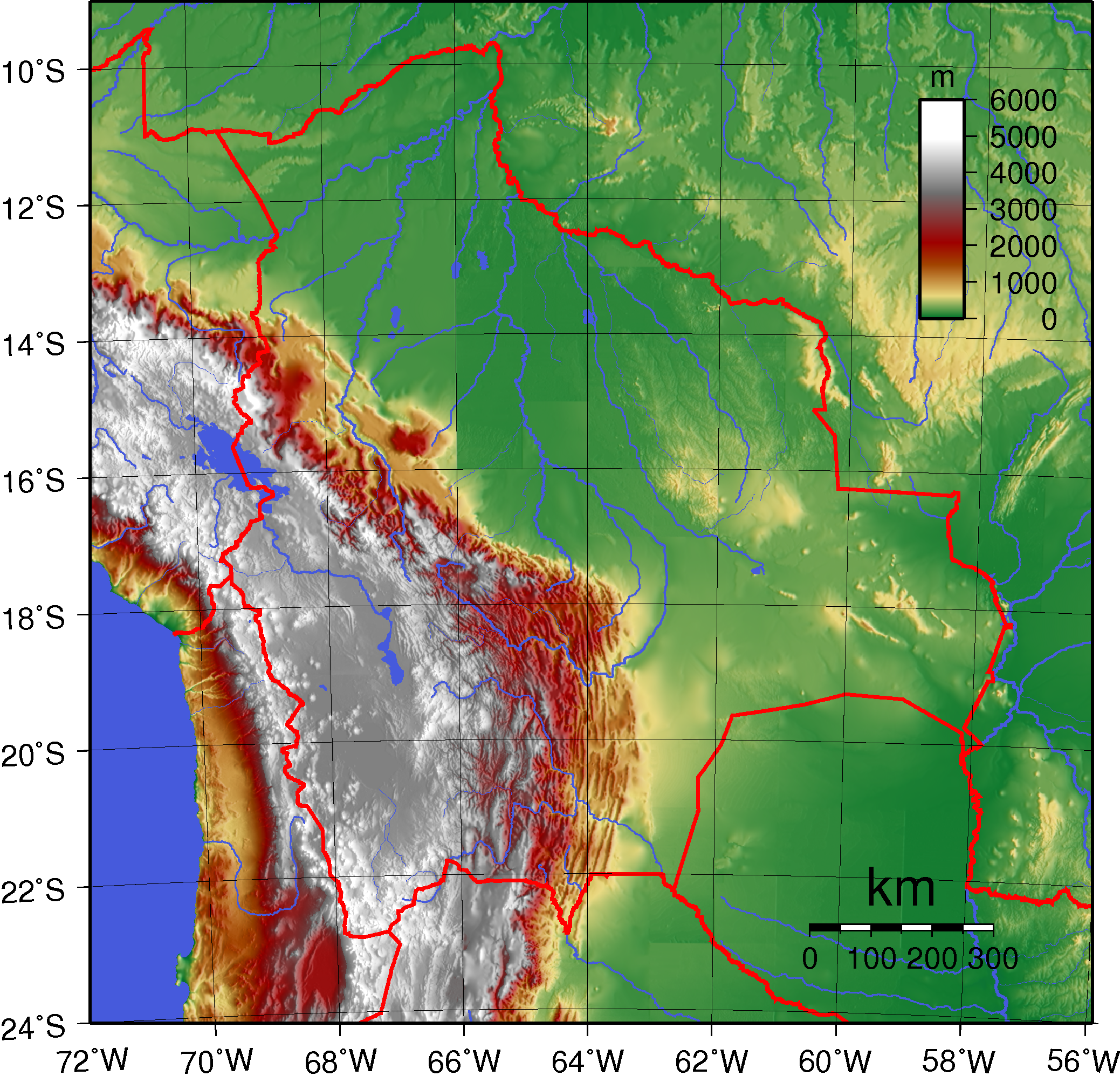
Topographic map of Bolivia showing (east to west) plains of Amazon Basin in green, Sub-Andean Zone in red, Eastern Cordillera in white, Altiplano in gray, and Western Cordillera in white

The Cordillera Occidental or Western Cordillera of Bolivia is part of the Andes (that is also part of the American Cordillera), a mountain range characterized by volcanic activity, making up the natural border with Chile and starting in the north with Juqhuri and ending in the south at the Licancabur volcano, which is on the southern limit of Bolivia with Chile. The border goes through the innominated point located at two-thirds of elevation of Licancabur's northeastern slope at the southwesternmost point of Bolivia at 22° 49' 41" south and 67° 52' 35" west. The climate of the region is cold and inadequate for animal and plant life. Its main feature is its ground, in which are large quantities of metallic minerals including gold, silver, copper, and others. The range consists of three sections:

- The northern section, in which you can find the highest peaks in Bolivia, tallest of which is the volcano Sajama at 6,542 meters. Sajama is perennially covered in snow. It contains the volcanoes Pomerape and Parinacota (called Payachata collectively), the latter being a dormant volcano with a cone of snow similar to Mount Fuji in Japan.
- The central section, situated between Uyuni and Coipasa. Its most prominent summit is the Ollagüe (Ullawi) volcano on the border with Chile.
- The southern section, characterized by volcanic activity and by having sandstorms and fog, taking into account Licancabur, which is 5,920 meters high (but only two-thirds of the northeastern slope of the volcano belong to Bolivia up to 5415 meters). The lakes Laguna Colorada and Laguna Verde can be found on Licancabur, so named because of their respective colors.

== See also ==
- Cordillera Central (Bolivia)
- Cordillera Oriental (Bolivia)
- Cordillera Occidental (disambiguation)
- Licancabur
