= List of volcanoes in Bolivia =

The country of Bolivia hosts numerous active (Note: In vulcanology and this article active volcanoes are those with Holocene eruption, that means eruptions in the last 10,000 years.) and extinct volcanoes across its territory. The active volcanoes are in western Bolivia making up the Cordillera Occidental, the western limit of the Altiplano plateau. Many of the active volcanoes are international mountains shared with Chile. All Cenozoic volcanoes of Bolivia are part of the Central Volcanic Zone (CVZ) of the Andean Volcanic Belt that results due to processes involved in the subduction of Nazca Plate under the South American Plate. The Central Volcanic Zone is a major upper Cenozoic volcanic province. Apart from Andean volcanoes, the geology of Bolivia includes the Guaporé Shield, remnants of ancient Precambrian volcanoes in the eastern part of the country.

Name	Elevation (m)	Elevation (ft)	Coordinates	Last eruption (VEI)
Abra Granada	5700	18,700	22°32′S 66°32′W	5 million years ago
Acotango	6052	19,855	18°22′56″S 69°02′52″W	Holocene
Anallajsi	5750	18,865	17°55′37″S 68°54′33″W	Holocene?
Asu Asuni	4968	16,299	18°13′S 68°31′W	-
Ascotan	5500	18,000	21°41′S 68°07′W	Unknown
Capurata	5990	19,652	18°24′54″S 69°02′45″W	-
Chascon-Runtu Jarita complex	4900	15,100	21°53′02″S 67°54′18″W	88,000 – 97,000 years ago
Cerro Napa	5170	16,960	20°30′S 68°40′W	1.38 million years
Chullkani	5032	16,509	18°18′39″S 68°50′24″W	Upper Pliocene
Ch'iyar Qullu	–	–	19°26′S 67°23′W	22 million years ago.
Ch'iyar Qullu	4051	13,290	19°43′28″S 67°39′16″W	-
Cerro Bonete (Lipez)	5630	18,470		15 million years ago
Chutinza	5184	17,008		
Colluma	3876	12,716	18°30′00″S 68°05′11″W	Unknown
Escala	4000	13,120	21°36′00″S 66°52′29″W	Holocene
Guacha	5250	17,220	22°45′S 67°28′W	1.7 million years ago
Guayaques	5598	18,366	22°53′51″S 67°33′59″W	Unknown
Iru Phutunqu	5163	16,939	20°43′51″S 68°33′09″W	1995
Jayu Quta	3716	12,026	19°27′55″S 67°25′34″W	Holocene?
Jitiri	5031	16,506	18°13′S 68°48′W	-
Jorcada	5650	18,865	22°01′34″S 67°45′52″W	95,000 BP
Laram Q'awa	5182	17,001		Holocene?
Kunturiri	5762	18,904	18°2′S 69°04′W	-
Licancabur	5415 in Bolivian part	17,717 in Bolivian part	22°49′41″S 67°52′35″W	Holocene
Lípez	5929	19,447	21°56′35″S 66°51′41″W	-
Michincha	5248	17,218	20°56′16″S 68°30′09″W	Holocene
Millunu				Miocene
Moiro (or: Cerro Negro)	4269	13,943	21°41′03″S 67°28′01″W	Holocene?
Morococala			18°10′S 66°45′W	6.4 million years ago
Nuevo Mundo	5438	17,841	19°46′27″S 66°28′42″W	Holocene
Olca	5353	17,562	20°56′38″S 68°28′33″W	Holocene
Ollagüe (Ullawi)	5863	19,231	21°18′07″S 68°10′45″W	Pleistocene
Pampa Luxsar	5543	18,185	20°50′55″S 68°11′54″W	Holocene
Panizos	5000	16,000	22°15′S 66°45′W	Miocene
Parina Quta	6348	20,827	18°09′58″S 69°08′33″W	290 AD ± 300 years
Paryani	5077	16,657	19°07′52″S 68°25′30″W	
Paruma	5420	17,782	20°56′36″S 68°27′32″W	1867
Patilla Pata	5700	18,700	18°02′29″S 69°04′30″W	Holocene
Pomerape	6282	20,413	18°07′33″S 69°07′39″W	Pleistocene
Porco			19°50′S 66°00′W	8.6 ± 0.3 million years ago
Pumiri	4862	15,951	19°00′S 68°26′W	Holocene?
Quetena	5730	18,794	22°15′33″S 67°24′56″W	Holocene or Pleistocene
Sacabaya (or:Quemado)	4300	14,107	18°37′32″S 68°44′55″W	Holocene?
Sairecabur	5971	19,584	22°43′06″S 67°53′26″W	Holocene
Sajama	6542	21,451	18°06′14″S 68°52′53″W	Holocene
San Agustín	4357	14,294	21°13′04″S 67°36′24″W	Holocene?
Santa Isabel	5240	17,191	21°38′26″S 66°31′40″W	Holocene
Sirk'i	5072	16,640	17°21′S 69°24′W	-
Saxani	5090	16,700	19°8′S 68°25′W	–
Soledad caldera				5.4 million years ago
Suni K'ira	5899	19,354	22°00′34″S 67°13′08″W	Pleistocene
Tata Sabaya	5430	17,815	19°07′58″S 68°31′31″W	Holocene
Titiwilla	5050	16,570	19°43′S 68°11′W	Pleistocene
Tocorpuri	5808	19,055	22°25′33″S 67°54′38″W	Holocene
Tunupa	5432	17,821	19°49′52″S 67°38′33″W	–
Umurata	5710	18,733	18°21′20″S 69°02′59″W	-
Uqi Uqini	5490	18,012	18°19′S 69°02′W	-
Uyarani	4259	13,973	18°28′21″S 68°39′19″W	-
Uturunku	6008	19,711	22°15′07″S 67°11′12″W	Holocene
Vilama			22°24′S 66°57′W	Miocene-Pleistocene
Wila Pukarani	4920	16,142	19°19′50″S 68°18′35″W	-
Yumia	4350	14,271	21°28′59″S 67°32′06″W	Holocene
Zapaleri	5653	18,546	22°48′30″S 67°10′40″W	–

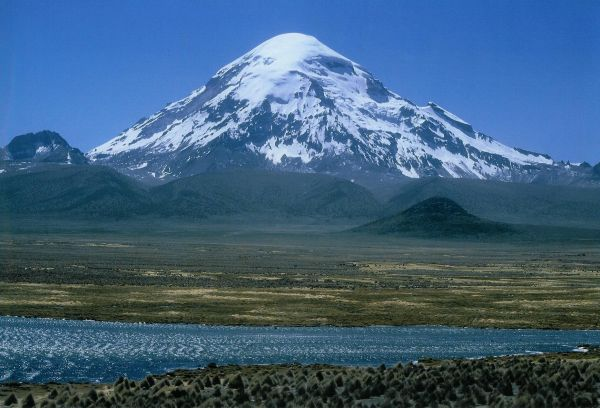
Sajama, a stratovolcano considered extinct.

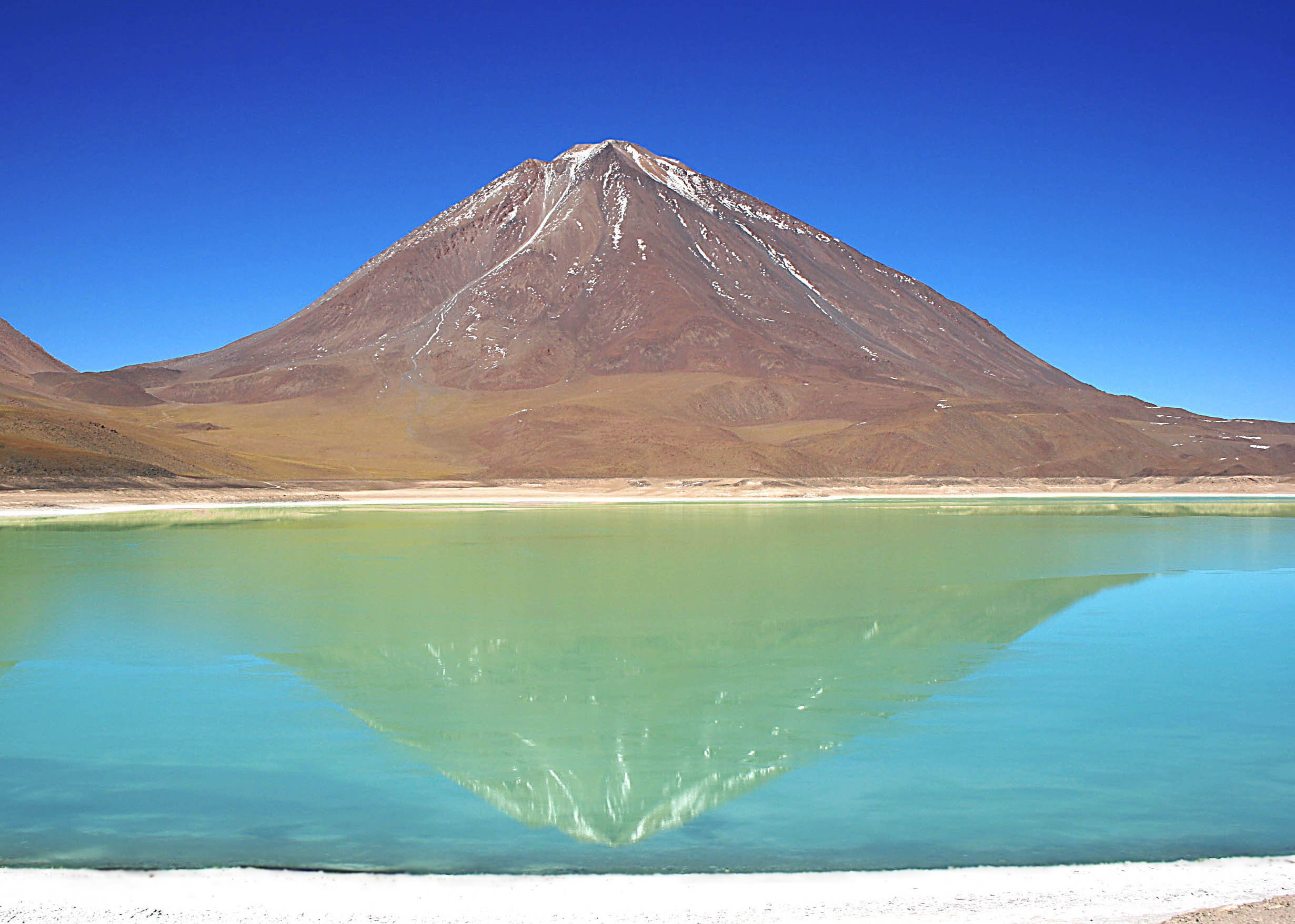
View of Licancabur. The summit area is in Chile.

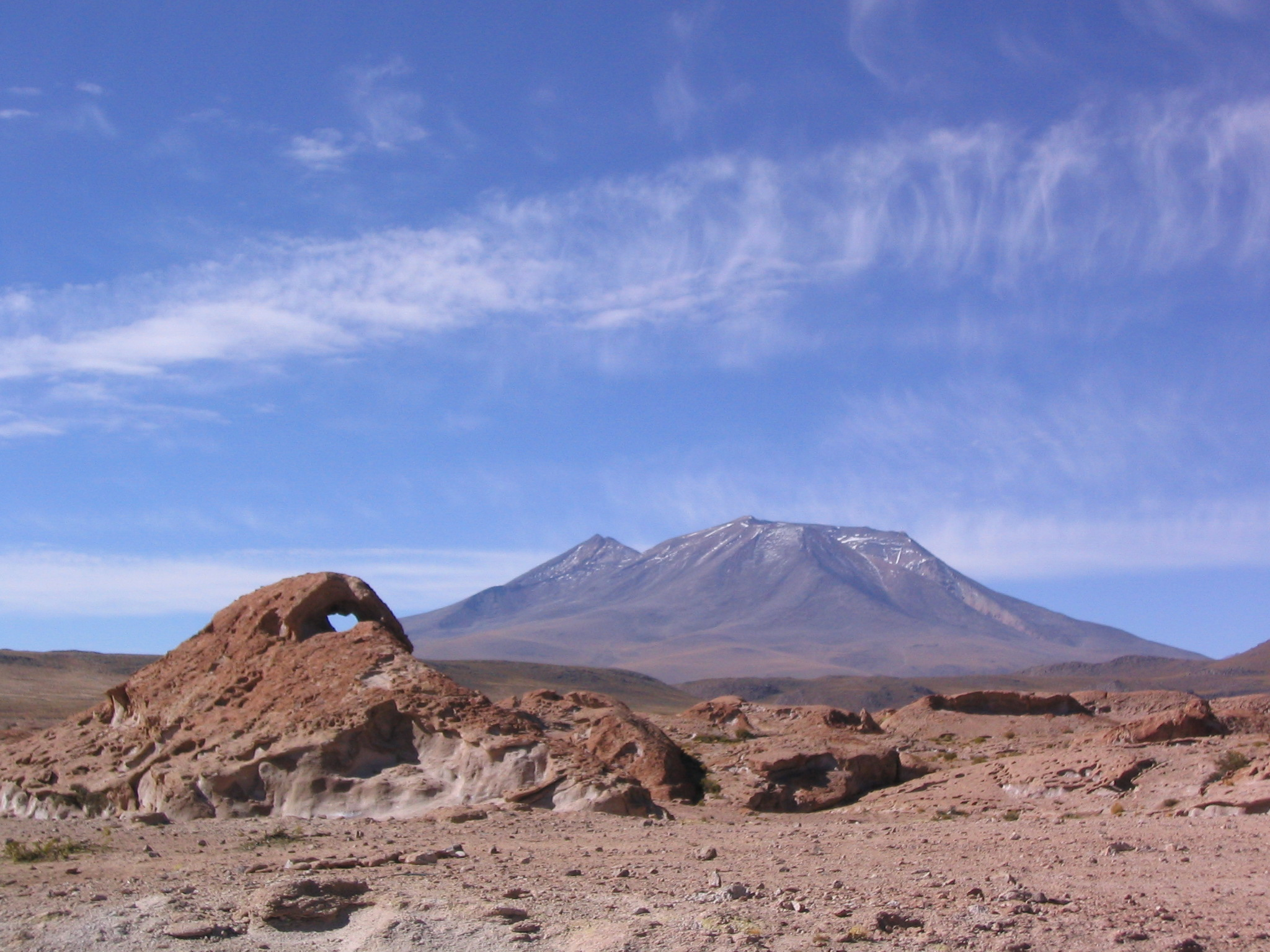
Ollagüe seen from Bolivia.

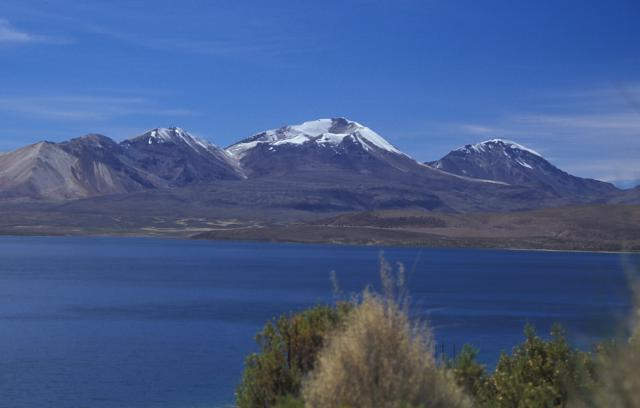
Acotango volcano seen from Chile.

== See also ==
- List of glaciers in South America
- Lists of volcanoes
