= Sabaya =

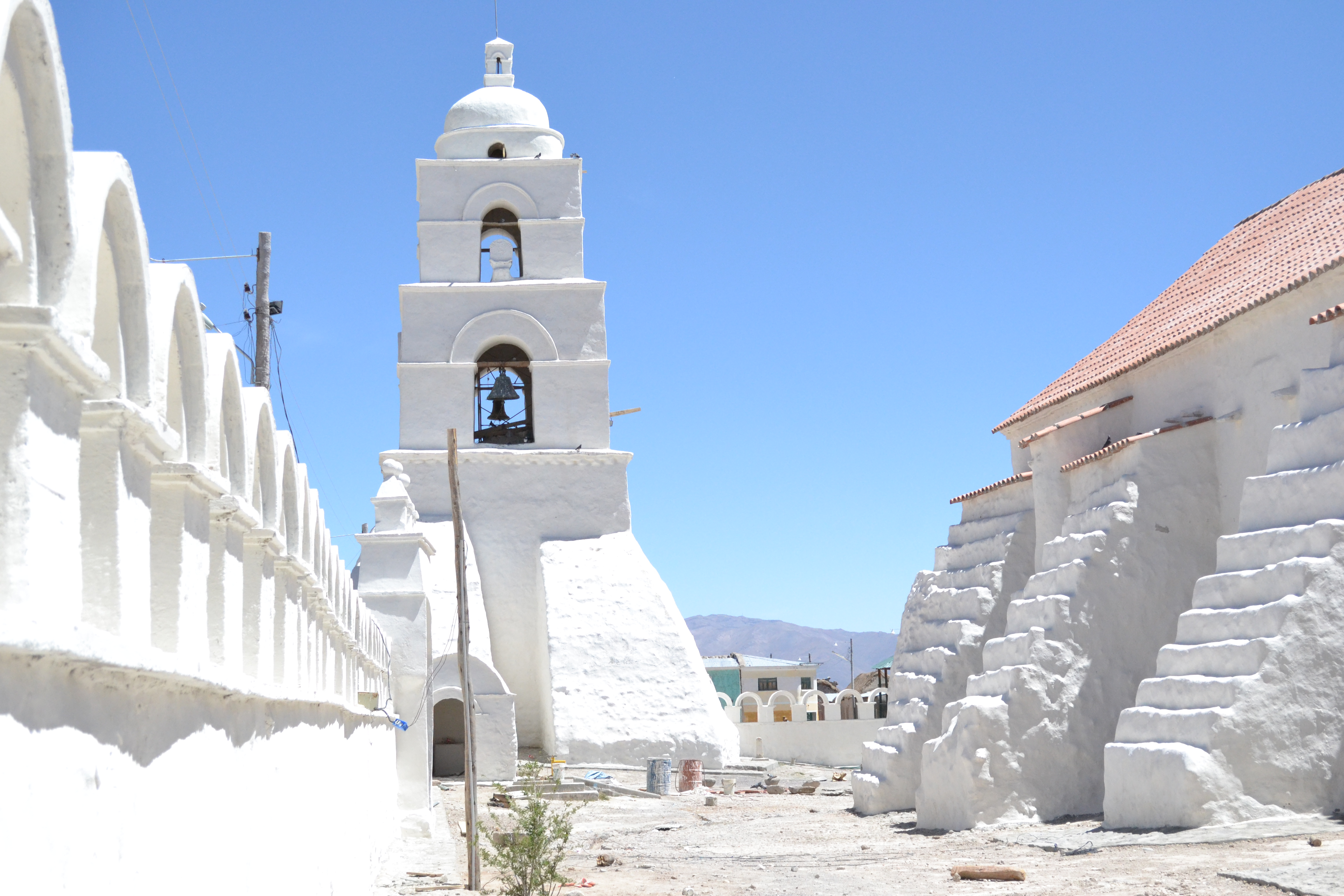
- Church of Sabaya
- Interactive map of Sabaya
- Coordinates: 19°00′53″S 68°22′15″W
- Country: Bolivia
- Department: Oruro
- Province: Sabaya Province
- Municipality: Sabaya Municipality

Population (2001)
  - Total: 573
- Time zone: UTC-4 (BOT)

Sabaya is a small town in the Bolivian Oruro Department. In 2001 it had a population of 573 inhabitants in 2001. Sabaya is the administrative center of both the Sabaya Province and the Sabaya Municipality. It is located 200 km (120 mi) south-west of Oruro, the department capital. It is situated at 3,698 m (12,133 ft) above sea level in the valley of the Sabaya River on the eastern slopes of Pumari (4,787 m [15,705 ft]). Salar de Coipasa lies 25 km (16 mi) south-east of Sabaya, and the stratovolcano Tata Sabaya (5,430 m [17,810 ft]) is situated 20 km (12 mi) south-west of Sabaya.

== See also ==
- Chipaya
- Jinchupalla
