= Taypi Qullu =

Taypi Qullu (Aymara taypi center, middle, qullu mountain, "center mountain", also spelled Taipi Kkollu, Taypi Khollu, Taypi Kkollu, Taipicollo) may refer to:

- Taypi Qullu (Carangas), a mountain in the Carangas Municipality, Mejillones Province, Oruro Department, Bolivia
- Taypi Qullu (La Paz), a mountain in the Murillo Province, La Paz Department, Bolivia
- Taypi Qullu (Mejillones), a mountain in the La Rivera Municipality, Mejillones Province, Oruro Department, Bolivia
- Taypi Qullu (Sabaya), a mountain in the Sabaya Province, Oruro Department, Bolivia
- Taypi Qullu (Sajama), a mountain southwest of Jach'a Apachita in the Turco Municipality, Sajama Province, Oruro Department, Bolivia
- Taypi Qullu (Turco), a mountain near Junt'u Uta in the Turco Municipality, Sajama Province, Oruro Department, Bolivia
