= Porco =

Porco may refer to:

- 7231 Porco, an asteroid
- Porco (caldera), in Bolivia
- Porco Municipality, Antonio Quijarro Province, Bolivia
- Porco Rosso, Japanese anime
- Porco Galliard, a fictional character in the anime/manga series Attack on Titan
- The Portuguese word for pig

== People with the surname ==
- Carolyn Porco, planetary scientist
- Christopher Porco, convicted for the murder of his father, attempted murder of his mother
- Robert Porco
- Linden Porco
- Filippo Porco

== See also ==
- Dos Porcos River (disambiguation)
