= Janq'u Qullu (Oruro) =

Mountain in Bolivia

- Location within Bolivia

Highest point
- Elevation: 4,822 m (15,820 ft)
- Coordinates: 18°55′56″S 68°48′38″W

Geography
- Location: Bolivia, Oruro Department, Mejillones Province
- Parent range: Andes, Cordillera Occidental

Janq'u Qullu (Aymara janq'u white, qullu mountain, "white mountain", also spelled Jankho Kkollu) is a 4,822-metre-high (15,820 ft) mountain in the Cordillera Occidental in the Andes of Bolivia. It is located in the Oruro Department, Mejillones Province, La Rivera Municipality. Janq'u Qullu lies southeast of Laram Pukara and Taypi Qullu.

== See also ==
- P'isaqiri
