= Paryani =

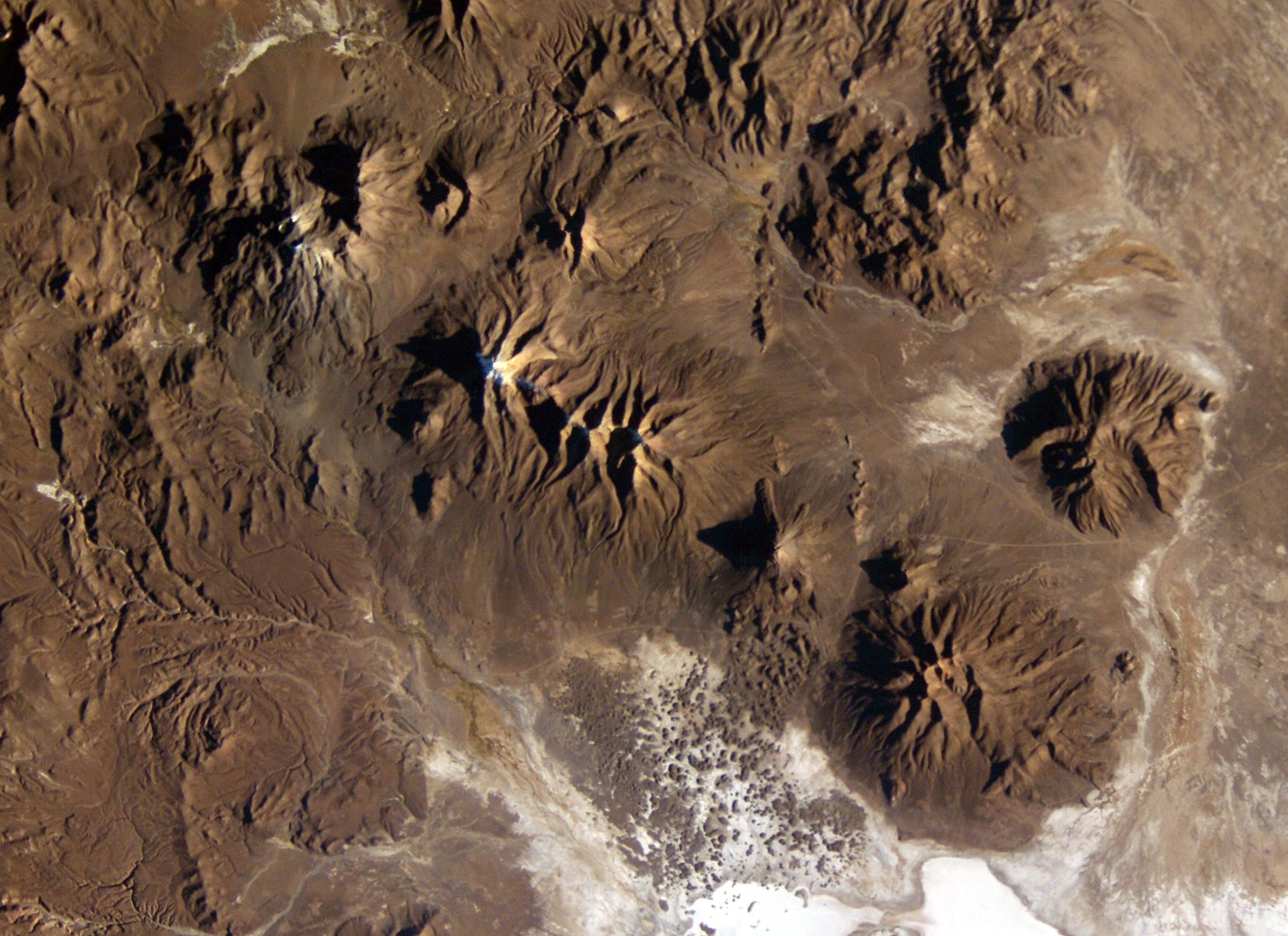
- The cones of Paryani (in the lower right part of this image) and Pumiri (above it, on the right) as seen from space (NASA) (north is to the upper right)

Highest point
- Elevation: 5,077 m (16,657 ft)
- Coordinates: 19°07′52″S 68°25′30″W

Geography
- Location within Bolivia
- Location: Bolivia; Oruro Department
- Parent range: Andes

Paryani (Quechua parya reddish; copper; sparrow, Aymara -ni a suffix, hispanicized spelling Pariani) is a 5,077-metre-high (16,657 ft) volcano in the Andes of Bolivia. It is located in the Oruro Department, Sabaya Province, Sabaya Municipality. The cone of Paryani lies at the Salar de Coipasa, south of Pumiri and east of Tata Sabaya.

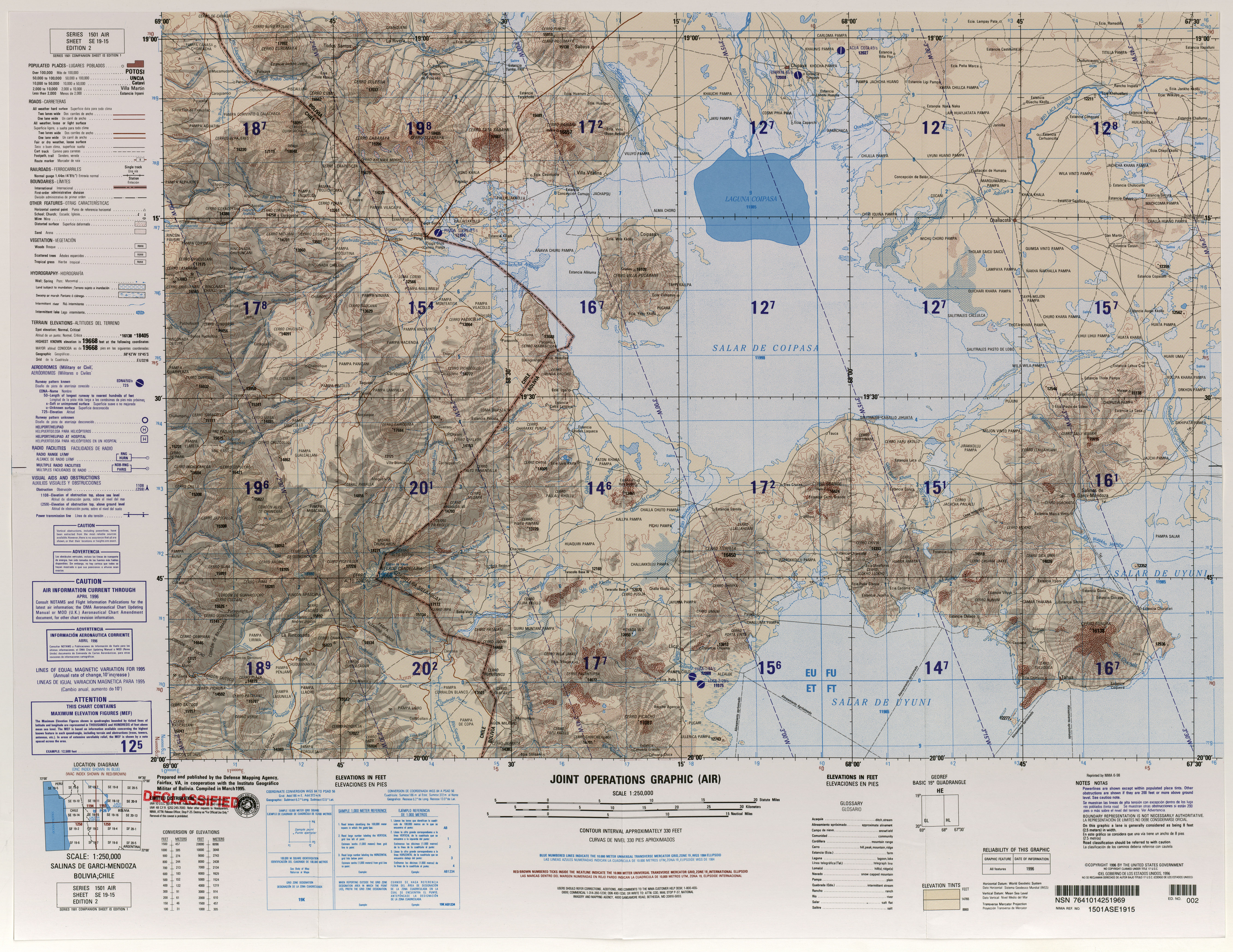
Map showing the cone of Paryani north of Salar de Coipasa
