= Las Vicuñas National Reserve =

Wildlife reserve in northern Chile

- IUCN category IV (habitat/species management area)
- Interactive map of Las Vicuñas National Reserve
- Location: Arica y Parinacota Region, Chile
- Nearest city: Putre
- Coordinates: 18°38′0″S 69°12′0″W
- Area: 2,091.31 km^{2} (807.46 sq mi)
- Designated: 1983
- Governing body: Corporación Nacional Forestal (CONAF)

Las Vicuñas National Reserve is a national reserve located in the Parinacota Province, Arica y Parinacota Region, Chile. The reserve lies immediately south of Lauca National Park and in its southern portion is contiguous to Salar de Surire Natural Monument, all of which form Lauca Biosphere Reserve. The major peaks are Arintika and Pukintika.

This dry puna ecosystem is home to high-elevation wildlife, including vicuñas, for which the reserve is named.

Much of the reserve consists of extensive Andean steppes cut by rivers and quebradas, the Lauca River being the main one. Typical vegetation includes pajonal, tolar and llaretal formations. The plant Polylepis tomentella, one of the highest-elevation shrubs known, can be found here.
