= Janq'u Ch'utu =

Mountain in Bolivia

- Location within Bolivia

Highest point
- Elevation: 4,324 m (14,186 ft)
- Coordinates: 18°57′34″S 68°33′54″W

Geography
- Location: Bolivia, Oruro Department, Sabaya Province
- Parent range: Andes

Janq'u Ch'utu (Aymara janq'u white, ch'utu peak of a mountain, top of the head, also spelled Jankho Chuto) is a 4,324-metre-high (14,186 ft) mountain in the Andes of Bolivia. It is located in the Oruro Department, Sabaya Province, Sabaya Municipality. Janq'u Ch'utu lies northeast of Churi Qullu.
