= P'iq'iñ Q'ara (Oruro) =

Mountain in Bolivia

- Location within Bolivia

Highest point
- Elevation: 4,763 m (15,627 ft)
- Coordinates: 18°58′12″S 68°53′25″W

Geography
- Location: Bolivia, Oruro Department, Sabaya Province
- Parent range: Andes, Cordillera Occidental

P'iq'iñ Q'ara (Aymara p'iq'iña head, q'ara bare, bald, p'iq'iña q'ara bald, "baldheaded", Hispanicized spelling Pekheñ Khara) is a 4,763-metre-high (15,627 ft) mountain in the Cordillera Occidental in the Andes of Bolivia. It is located in the Oruro Department, Sabaya Province, Sabaya Municipality. P'iq'iñ Q'ara is situated south-west of the mountain Kimsa Chata, near the border with Chile. It lies at the confluence of the rivers Chullumpiri Jawira and Lliscaya Jawira.
