= Pukara (Yapu Qullu) =

Mountain in Bolivia

- Location within Bolivia

Highest point
- Elevation: 4,260 m (13,980 ft)
- Coordinates: 18°51′38″S 68°39′16″W

Geography
- Location: Bolivia, Oruro Department, Mejillones Province, Carangas Municipality
- Parent range: Andes

Pukara (Aymara for fortress, also named Pucara Grande) is a mountain in the Andes of Bolivia which reaches a height of approximately 4,260 m (13,980 ft). It is located in the Oruro Department, Mejillones Province, Carangas Municipality, north of Yapu Qullu.
