= Qillwiri =

Mountain in Bolivia

- Location within Bolivia

Highest point
- Coordinates: 18°50′35″S 68°55′32″W

Geography
- Location: Bolivia, Oruro Department, Sabaya Province; Chile, Arica y Parinacota Region
- Parent range: Andes, Cordillera Occidental

Qillwiri (Aymara qillwa, qiwña, qiwlla Andean gull, -(i)ri a suffix, also spelled Khellhuiri) is a mountain in the Andes on the border of Bolivia and Chile. On the Chilean side it is located in the Arica y Parinacota Region. It is situated in the Cordillera Occidental between the mountains Pukintika in the north-west and Lliscaya in the south-east, east of the Suriri salt flat. On the Bolivian side the mountain lies in the Oruro Department, Sabaya Province, Sabaya Municipality.

== See also ==
- Kimsa Chata
