= Yapu Qullu =

Yapu Qullu (Aymara yapu field, qullu mountain "field mountain", also spelled Yapu Khollo, Yapu Kkollu, Yapucollu, Yapukkollu) may refer to:

- Yapu Qullu (Mejillones), a mountain in the Mejillones Province, Oruro Department, Bolivia
- Yapu Qullu (Sajama), a mountain in the Sajama Province, Oruro Department, Bolivia
- Yapu Qullu (Totora), a mountain in the San Pedro de Totora Province, Oruro Department, Bolivia
