= Chuqu Chuquni (Bolivia) =

Mountain in Bolivia

- Location within Bolivia

Highest point
- Elevation: 4,522 m (14,836 ft)
- Coordinates: 18°53′29″S 68°34′05″W

Geography
- Location: Bolivia; Oruro Department
- Parent range: Andes

Chuqu Chuquni (Aymara chuqu chuqu icicle, -ni a suffix, "the one with many icicles", Hispanicized spelling Chokho Chokhoni, erroneously also Chokhoni) is a 4,522-metre-high (14,836 ft) mountain in the Andes of Bolivia. It is located in the Oruro Department, Sabaya Province, Sabaya Municipality, southwest of the village of Tunapa. Pacha Qullu lies northwest of Inka Qhamachu. Chuqu Chuquni lies southwest of Pacha Qullu and northwest of Pumiri.
