= Chinchillani =

Chinchillani may refer to:

- Chinchillani (Bolivia), a mountain in the La Paz Department, Bolivia
- Chinchillani (Oruro), a mountain in the Oruro Department, Bolivia
- Chinchillani (Peru), a mountain in Peru
