= Wila Qullu (Sabaya) =

Mountain in Bolivia

- Location within Bolivia

Highest point
- Elevation: 4,600 m (15,100 ft)
- Coordinates: 18°47′05″S 68°50′42″W

Geography
- Location: Bolivia, Oruro Department, Sabaya Province
- Parent range: Andes, Cordillera Occidental

Wila Qullu (Aymara wila red, blood, qullu mountain, "red mountain", hispanicized spelling Wila Khollu, Wila Kkollu) is a mountain in the Bolivian Andes, about 4,600 metres (15,092 ft) high. It situated in the Cordillera Occidental near the border with Chile. It is located in the Oruro Department, Sabaya Province, Sabaya Municipality, Julo Canton. Wila Qullu lies south-east of the volcano Pukintika and north-west of the mountain Phaq'u Q'awa.

== See also ==
- Kimsa Chata
- List of mountains in the Andes
