= Chipaya =

Chipaya may refer to:

- Chipaya language, a language of Bolivia
- Chipaya (village), a village in Bolivia
