= Sabaya Province =

Sabaya
- Province
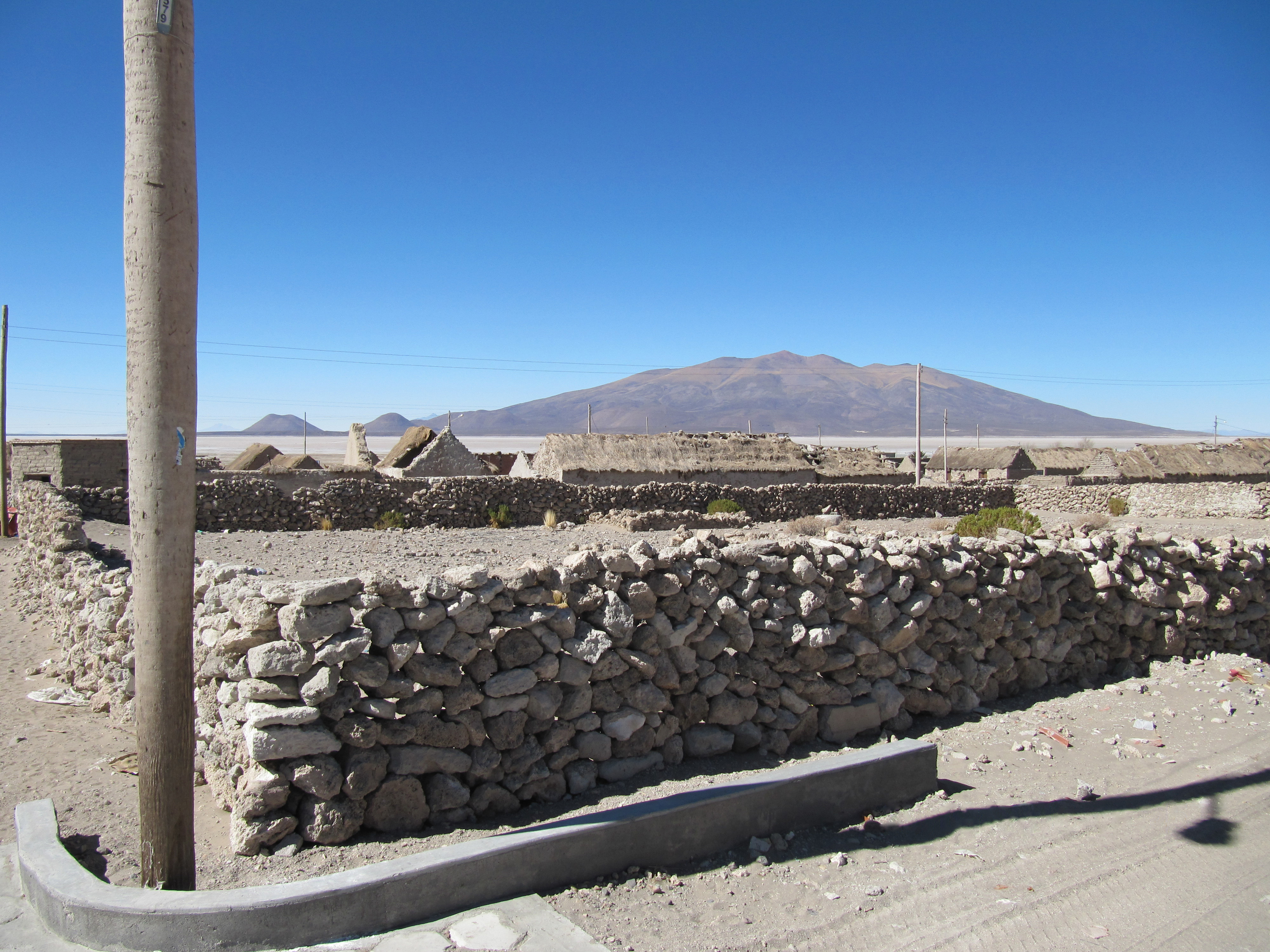
- Wila Pukarani volcano as seen from the north

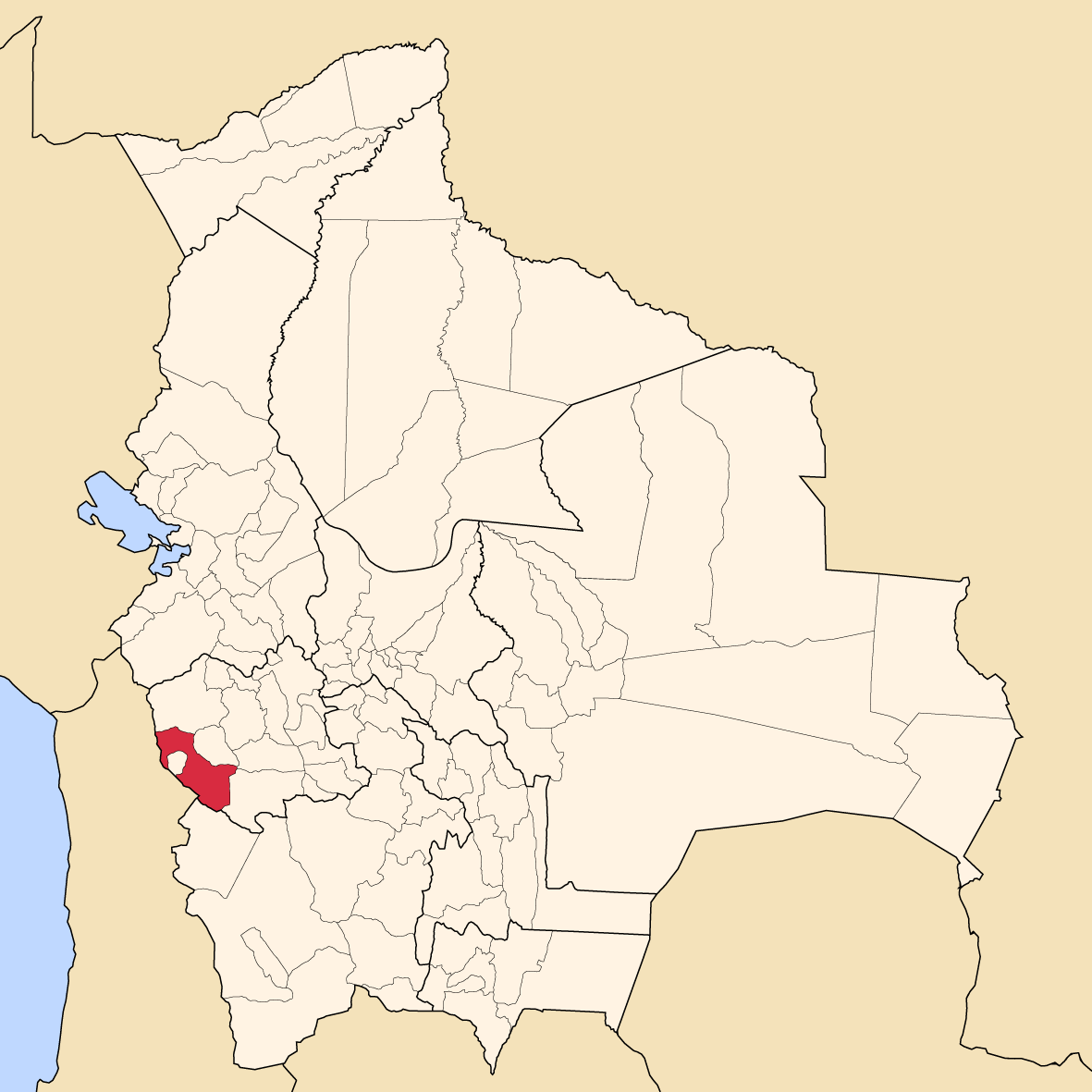
- Location of Sabaya (Atahuallpa) Province in Bolivia
- Coordinates: 19°07′S 68°05′W
- Country: Bolivia
- Department: Oruro
- Capital: Sabaya
- Municipalities: Chipaya, Coipasa, Sabaya

Area
  - Total: 5,885 km^{2} (2,272 sq mi)

Population (2024)
  - Total: 19,158
  - Density: 3.255/km^{2} (8.431/sq mi)
  - Ethnicities: Aymara

Languages spoken
  - Spanish: 92%
  - Aymara: 67%
  - Quechua: 9%

Sectors
  - Agriculture: 66.4%
  - General: 27.1%
  - Industry: 4.9%
  - Mining: 1.6%
- Time zone: UTC-4 (BOT)
- Area code: 591 2
- Catholic: 59%
- Protestant: 32%

Sabaya (formerly Atahuallpa) is a province in the west central section of the Bolivian Oruro Department. Its seat is the town of Sabaya.

== Location ==
Sabaya Province is one of sixteen provinces forming Oruro Department. It is located between 18° 35' and 19° 39' South and between 67° 31' and 68° 39' West.

It borders Sajama Province in the north, the Republic of Chile and Puerto de Mejillones Province in the west, the Potosí Department in the southwest, the Ladislao Cabrera Province in the southeast, and the Litoral Province in the northeast.

The province extends over 160 km from northwest to southeast, and 50 km from northeast to southwest.

== Geography ==
One of the highest peaks of the province is Pukintika, on the border to Chile. Other mountains are listed below:

- Chila Qullu
- Chinchillani
- Chullpani
- Chuqu Chuquni
- Janq'u Ch'utu
- Janq'u Willk'i
- Jinchupalla
- Kimsa Chata
- Pallall Qullu
- Paryani
- Pumiri
- Phaq'u Q'awa
- P'iq'iñ Q'ara
- Qillwiri
- Salli Wintu
- Taypi Qullu
- Wila Pukarani
- Wila Qullu
- Wintu Qullu
- Yawar Qullu

== Climate ==
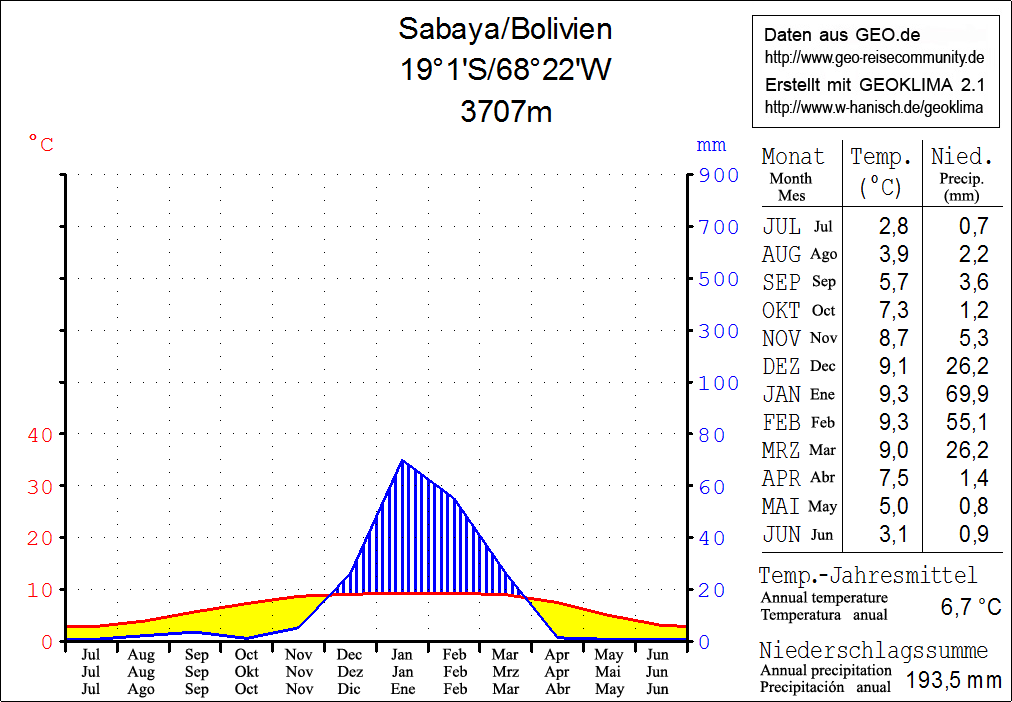
Climate chart of the Sabaya Province in the Walter and Lieth format, metric, °Celsius und millimeters

== Demographics ==
The population increased from 3,567 inhabitants (1992 census) to 7,114 (2001 census), a growth rate of almost 100%. 40.7% of the population is younger than 15 years old.

The main language in the province is Spanish, spoken by 92%; 67% of the population speak Aymara and 9% speak Quechua.

66.4% of the population are employed in agriculture, 1.6% in mining, 4.9% in industry, 27.1% in general services (2001).

59% of the population are Catholics, 32% are Protestants (1992).

== Subdivisions ==
The province comprises three municipalities, which are further subdivided into cantons.

Section	Municipality	Seat
1st	Sabaya Municipality	Sabaya
2nd	Coipasa Municipality	Coipasa
3rd	Chipaya Municipality	Chipaya

== See also ==
- Chipaya
