= Taypi Qullu (Carangas) =

Mountain in Bolivia

- Location within Bolivia

Highest point
- Elevation: 4,240 m (13,910 ft)
- Coordinates: 18°57′41″S 68°36′09″W

Geography
- Location: Bolivia, Oruro Department, Mejillones Province
- Parent range: Andes

Taypi Qullu (Aymara taypi center, middle, qullu mountain, "center mountain", also spelled Taypi Kkollu) is a mountain in the Andes of Bolivia which reaches a height of approximately 4,240 m (13,910 ft). It is located in the Oruro Department, Mejillones Province, Carangas Municipality, southeast of Carangas. Taypi Qullu lies northwest of Churi Qullu.
