= Taypi Qullu (Mejillones) =

Mountain in Bolivia

- Location within Bolivia

Highest point
- Elevation: 5,062 m (16,608 ft)
- Coordinates: 18°54′58″S 68°49′33″W

Geography
- Location: Bolivia, Oruro Department, Mejillones Province
- Parent range: Andes, Cordillera Occidental

Taypi Qullu (Aymara taypi center, middle, qullu mountain, "center mountain", Hispanicized spelling Taypi Kkollu) is a 5,062-metre-high (16,608 ft) mountain in the Cordillera Occidental in the Andes of Bolivia. It lies in the Oruro Department, Mejillones Province, La Rivera Municipality. Taypi Qullu is situated south of the mountain Chullumpiri, south-west of Laram Pukara and north-west of Janq'u Qullu. The river Ch'iyar Qullu Jawira ("black mountain river", also spelled Chiar Kkollu Jahuira) flows along its slopes and then to the south-west.
