= Lauca =

Coordinates: 18.3500°S 69.3000°W

Lauca is a Biosphere Reserve, located in northern Chile, in Arica y Parinacota Region. The reserve comprises three protected areas: Lauca National Park, Las Vicuñas National Reserve and Salar de Surire Natural Monument. This zone was declared a Biosphere Reserve by UNESCO in 1981.

== See also ==
- List of environment topics
- World Network of Biosphere Reserves

== References and external links ==
- Lauca Biosphere Reserve
