= Pukara (Mejillones) =

Mountain in Bolivia

- Location within Bolivia

Highest point
- Elevation: 4,468 m (14,659 ft)
- Coordinates: 18°56′22″S 68°34′20″W

Geography
- Location: Bolivia, Oruro Department, Mejillones Province
- Parent range: Andes

Pukara (Aymara and Quechua for fortress, Hispanicized spelling Pucara) is a 4,468-metre-high (14,659 ft) mountain in the Andes of Bolivia. It is situated in the Oruro Department, Mejillones Province, Carangas Municipality, east of Carangas.

== See also ==
- P'isaqiri
