= Coipasa Municipality =

Municipality in Sabaya, Bolivia

Coipasa
- Municipality
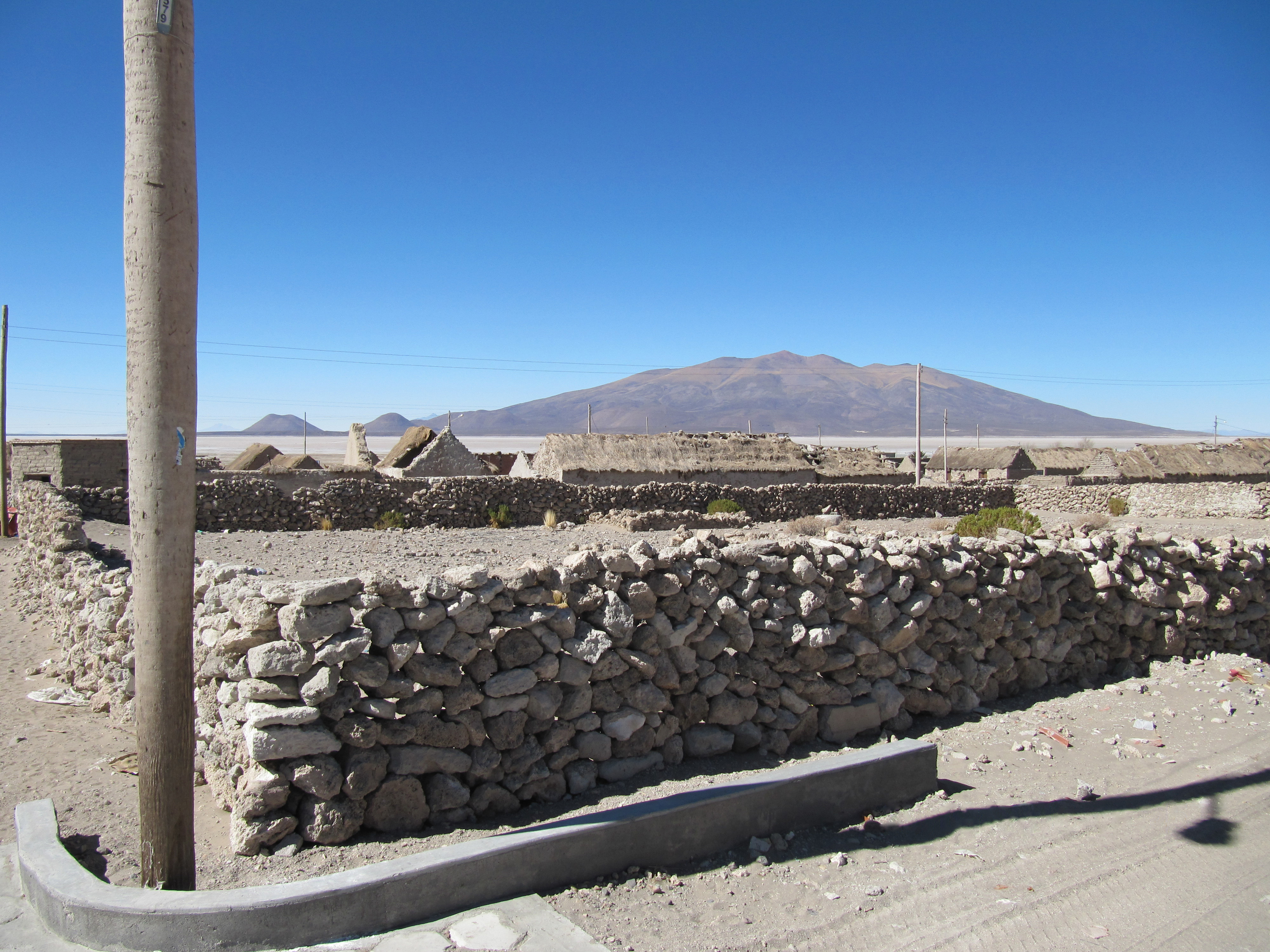

- Location within Bolivia
- Coordinates: 19°16′37″S 68°16′43″W
- Country: Bolivia
- Department: Oruro
- Province: Sabaya

Government
  - Mayor: Romulo Perez Rojas

Area
  - Total: 204.2 km^{2} (78.8 sq mi)
- Elevation: 3,709 m (12,169 ft)

Population (2020)
  - Total: 951
  - Density: 4.66/km^{2} (12.1/sq mi)
- Time zone: UTC-4 (BOT)

Coipasa is a rural municipality in Sabaya Province, Oruro Department, Bolivia. It is surrounded by Coipasa Lake on three directions, and has an average elevation of 3,709 meters above the sea level.

The municipality was created by Law of 8 June 1966, during the presidency of Alfredo Ovando Candía. As of 2020, there are 951 residents within Coipasa.

== Climate ==
Coipasa has a Semi-arid Climate (BSk). It sees the most rainfall in January, with an average precipitation of 130 mm; and the least rainfall in June, with an average precipitation of 1 mm.

Climate data for Coipasa
Month	Jan	Feb	Mar	Apr	May	Jun	Jul	Aug	Sep	Oct	Nov	Dec	Year
Mean daily maximum °C (°F)	16.9 (62.4)	16.5 (61.7)	17.3 (63.1)	17.5 (63.5)	15.7 (60.3)	14.1 (57.4)	13.4 (56.1)	15.4 (59.7)	17.3 (63.1)	18.9 (66.0)	20.1 (68.2)	19.5 (67.1)	16.9 (62.4)
Daily mean °C (°F)	10.5 (50.9)	10.3 (50.5)	10.3 (50.5)	9.5 (49.1)	7.1 (44.8)	5.8 (42.4)	5.2 (41.4)	6.8 (44.2)	8.4 (47.1)	9.9 (49.8)	11.0 (51.8)	11.5 (52.7)	8.9 (47.9)
Mean daily minimum °C (°F)	5.0 (41.0)	5.0 (41.0)	3.8 (38.8)	1.9 (35.4)	−0.4 (31.3)	−1.3 (29.7)	−1.8 (28.8)	−1.0 (30.2)	0.1 (32.2)	1.2 (34.2)	2.3 (36.1)	4.2 (39.6)	1.6 (34.9)
Average rainfall mm (inches)	130 (5.1)	114 (4.5)	65 (2.6)	13 (0.5)	2 (0.1)	1 (0.0)	3 (0.1)	5 (0.2)	3 (0.1)	7 (0.3)	14 (0.6)	60 (2.4)	417 (16.5)
Source: Climate-Data.org

== See also ==
- Coipasa Lake
- Salar de Uyuni
- Eduardo Avaroa Andean Fauna National Reserve
