= Janq'u Willk'i (Oruro) =

Mountain in Bolivia

- Location within Bolivia

Highest point
- Elevation: 4,320 m (14,170 ft)
- Coordinates: 18°50′22″S 68°38′46″W

Geography
- Location: Bolivia, Oruro Department, Mejillones Province
- Parent range: Andes

Janq'u Willk'i (Aymara janq'u white, willk'i gap, "white gap", also spelled Jankho Willkhi) is a mountain in the Andes of Bolivia which reaches a height of approximately 4,320 m (14,170 ft). It is located in the Oruro Department, Mejillones Province, Carangas Municipality, and in the Sabaya Province, Sabaya Municipality.
