= Pallall Qullu =

Mountain in Bolivia

- Location within Bolivia

Highest point
- Elevation: 4,033 m (13,232 ft)
- Coordinates: 18°51′25″S 68°36′51″W

Geography
- Location: Bolivia, Oruro Department, Mejillones Province
- Parent range: Andes

Pallall Qullu (Aymara pallalla flat, qullu mountain, "flat mountain", also spelled Pallall Kkollu) is a 4,033-metre-high (13,232 ft) mountain in the Andes of Bolivia. It is located in the Oruro Department, Mejillones Province, Carangas Municipality, and in the Sabaya Province, Sabaya Municipality.
