= Puerto de Mejillones Province =

Puerto de Mejillones
- Province
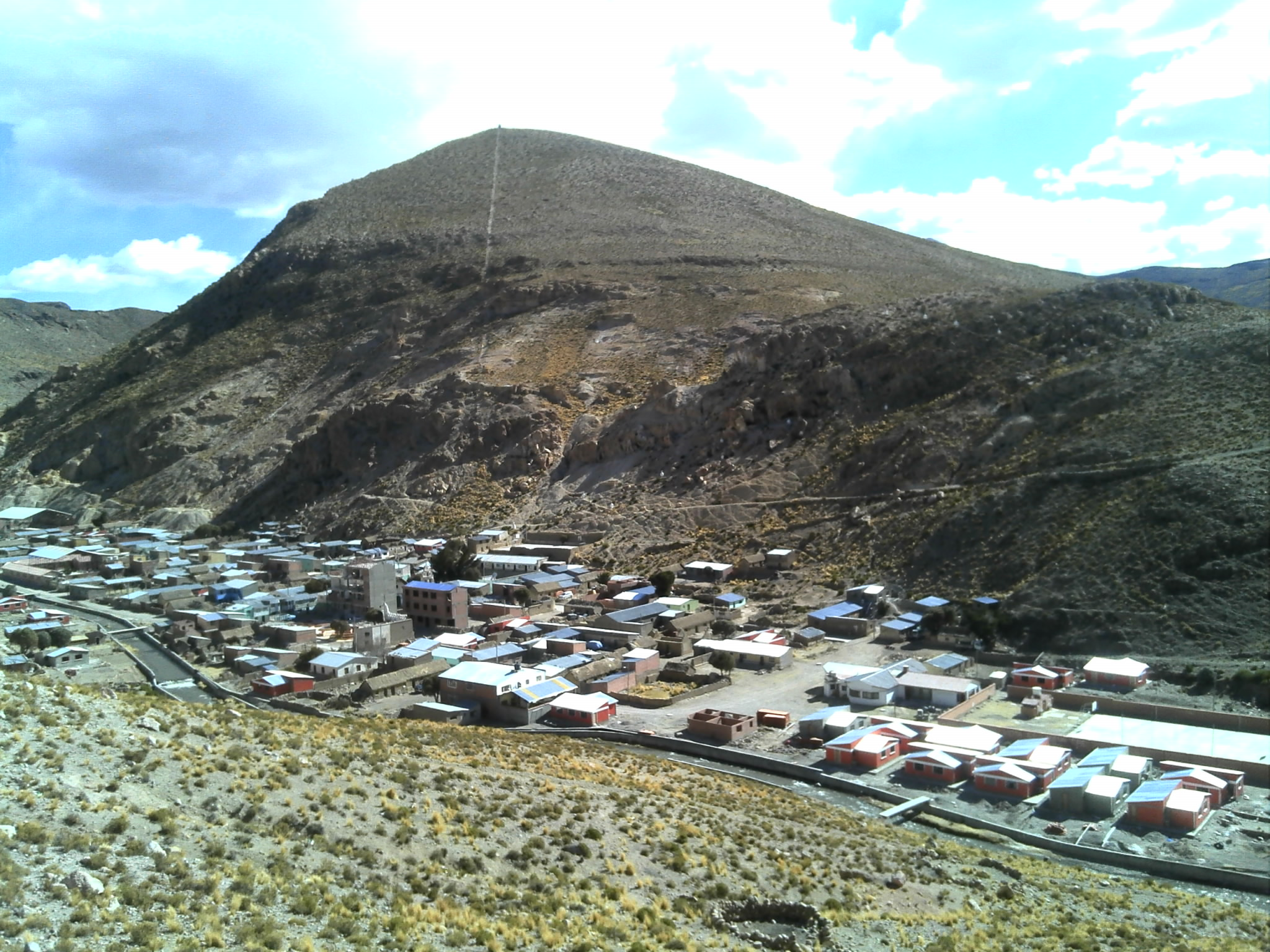
- View of Todos Santos

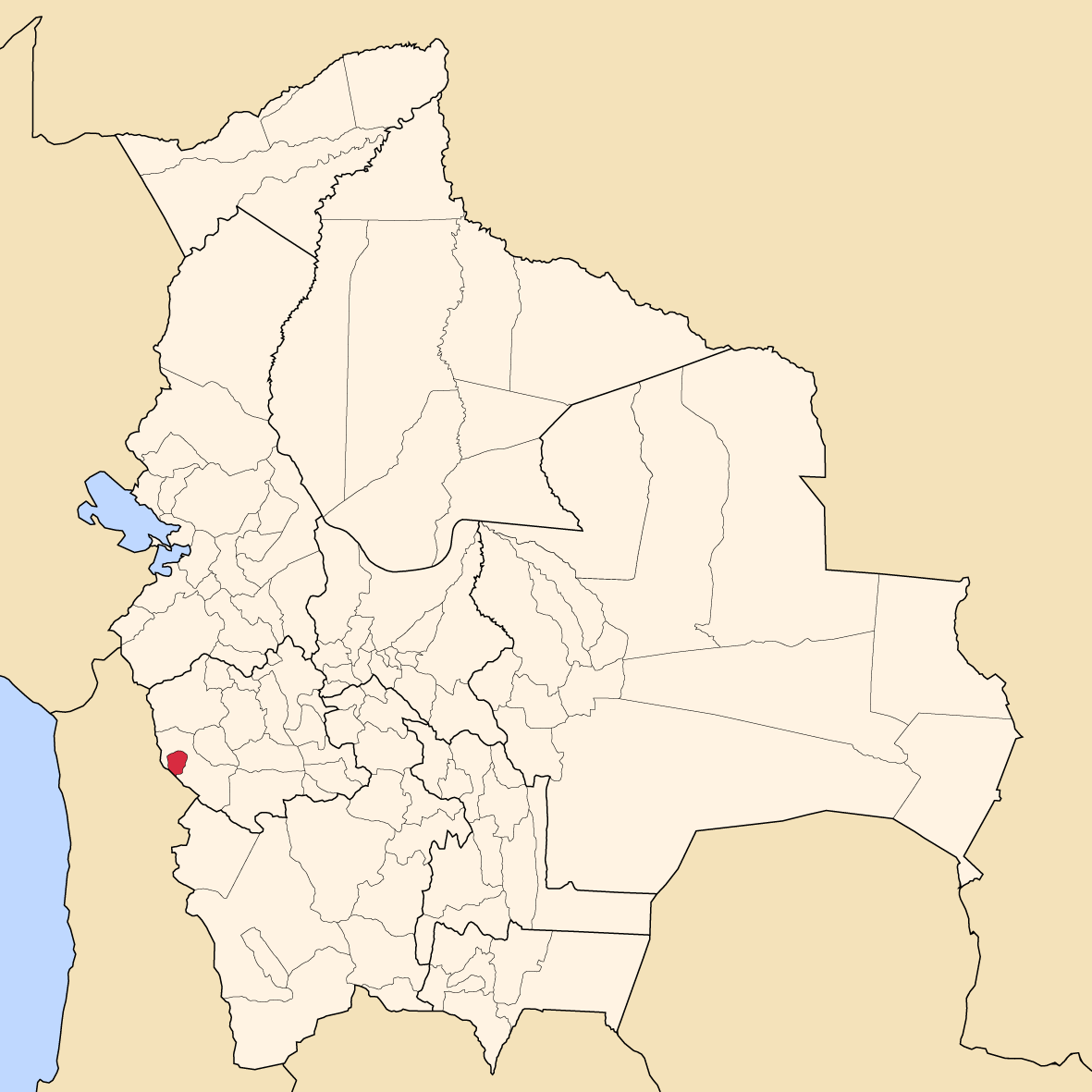
- Location of Puerto de Mejillones Province within Bolivia
- Coordinates: 19°05′S 68°18′W
- Country: Bolivia
- Department: Oruro
- Capital: La Rivera

Area
  - Total: 759 km^{2} (293 sq mi)

Population (2024 census)
  - Total: 3,528
  - Density: 4.65/km^{2} (12.0/sq mi)
  - Ethnicities: Aymara Quechua

Languages spoken (2001)
  - Spanish: 97.0%
  - Aymara: 66.6%
  - Quechua: 8.6%

Sectors
- Time zone: UTC-4 (BOT)

Puerto de Mejillones is a province in the western parts of the Bolivian department of Oruro. It is one of the sixteen provinces in the Oruro Department. Its seat is La Rivera.

== Location ==
The province is located between 18° 53' and 19° 16' South and between 68° 10' and 68° 26' West. It is surrounded by Sabaya Province in the north, west and east, and it borders the Republic of Chile in the southwest. The province extends over 45 km from north to south, and 35 km from east to west.

== Geography ==
Some of the highest mountains of the province are listed below:

- Churi Qullu
- Laram Pukara
- Jach'a Siwinqani
- Janq'u Qullu
- Janq'u Willk'i
- Kunturiri
- Pallall Qullu
- Pastu Qullu
- Pukara
- Pukara (near Yapu Qullu)
- P'isaqiri
- Qala Pirqata
- Tankani
- Taypi Qullu
- Taypi Qullu (Carangas)
- T'ula Qullu
- Yapu Qullu

== Division ==
The province comprises three municipalities which are further subdivided into cantons.

Section	Municipality	Seat
1st	La Rivera Municipality	La Rivera
2nd	Todos Santos Municipality	Todos Santos
3rd	Carangas Municipality	Carangas

== Demographics ==
Main language of the province is Spanish, spoken by 97.0%, while 66.6% of the population speak Aymara and 8.6% Quechua (1992).

The population increased from 751 inhabitants (1992 census) to 1,130 (2001 census), an increase of 50%.

42.6% of the population are younger than 15 years old (1992).

74% of the population have no access to electricity, 73% have no sanitary facilities (1992).

83.8% of the population are employed in agriculture, 1.0% in industry, 15.2% in general services (2001).

74% of the population are Catholics, 18% are Protestants (1992).
