= Pukintika =

Mountain in Bolivia

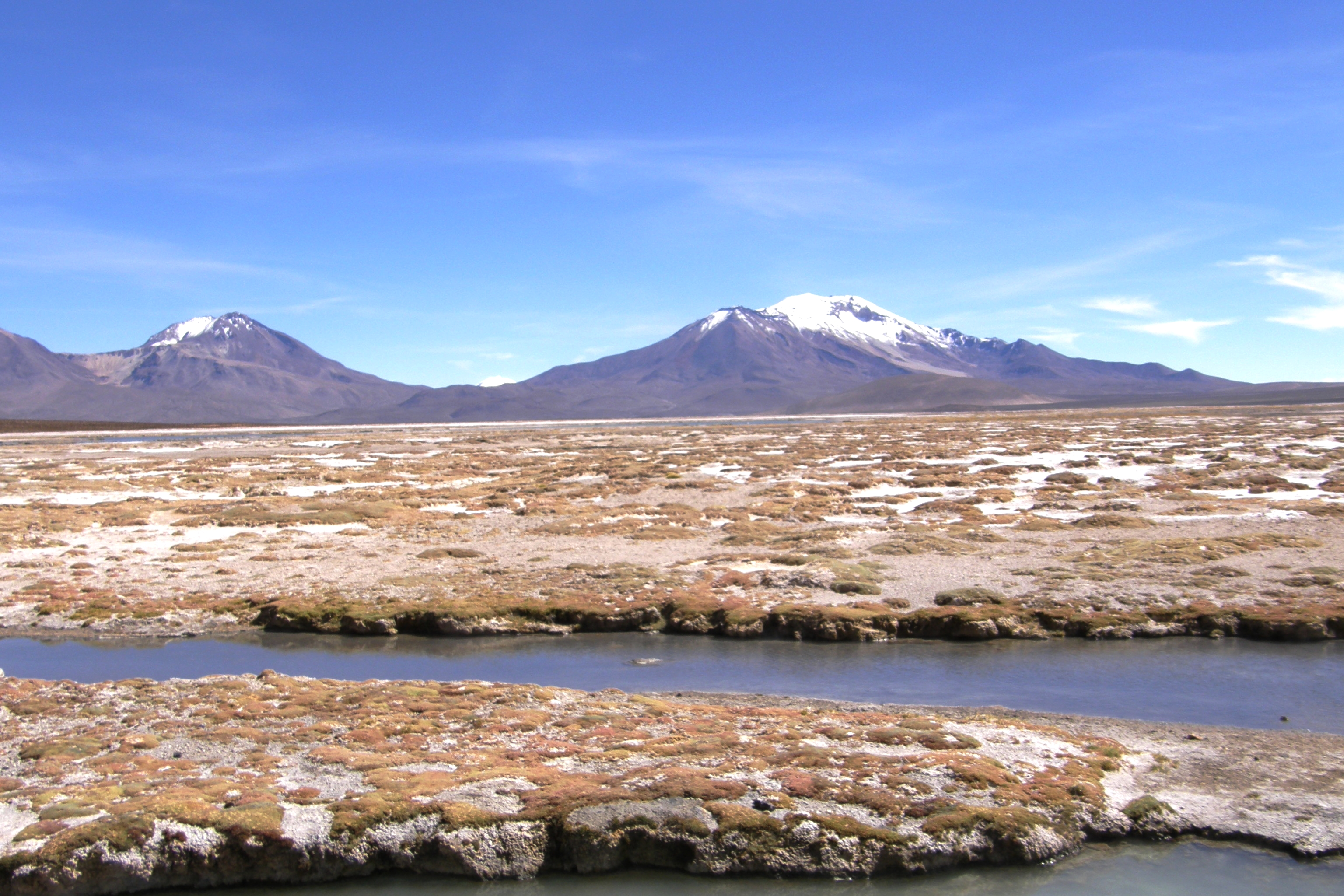
- Arintika (left) and Pukintika (right) as seen from Polloquere hot springs area.

Highest point
- Elevation: 5,407 m (17,740 ft)
- Coordinates: 18°44′S 68°59′W

Geography
- Location within Bolivia
- Location: Bolivia-Chile
- Parent range: Andes, Cordillera Occidental

Pukintika (Aymara puki white soil, tika adobe, Hispanicized spellings Puguintica, Puquintica, Poquentica, Puquentica) is a volcano in the Andes, about 5,407 m (17,740 ft) high, situated in the Cordillera Occidental on the border of Bolivia and Chile. It is located in the Arica and Parinacota Region of Chile and the Oruro Department of Bolivia (in Sabaya Province, Sabaya Municipality, Julo Canton). Pukintika lies to the north of the Salar de Surire, east beside Arintika volcano which is younger than Pukintika. Pukintika also features a crater lake with a surface area of 2,500 square metres (27,000 sq ft). Deposits of elemental sulfur have been found on Pukintika.

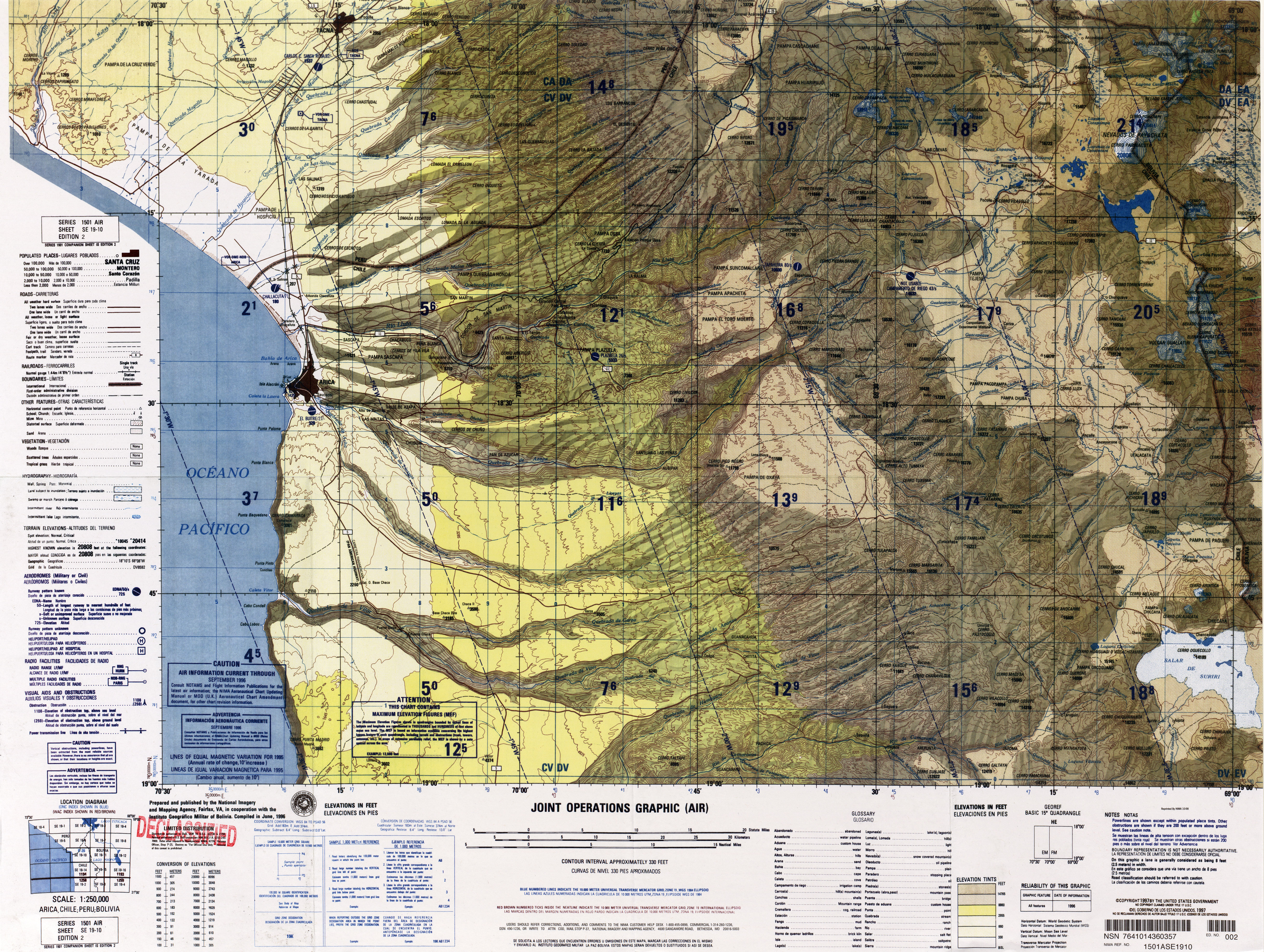
Map showing Pukintika on the border of Bolivia and Chile

== See also ==
- Asu Asuni
- Kimsa Chata
- List of mountains in the Andes
- Qillwiri
- Uyarani
- Wila Qullu
