= Phaq'u Q'awa (Sabaya) =

Mountain in Bolivia

- Location within Bolivia

Highest point
- Elevation: 5,203 m (17,070 ft)
- Coordinates: 18°49′04″S 68°48′07″W

Geography
- Location: Bolivia
- Parent range: Andes, Cordillera Occidental

Phaq'u Q'awa is a 5,203-metre-high (17,070 ft) mountain in the Cordillera Occidental in the Andes of Bolivia. It is situated in the Oruro Department, Sabaya Province, Sabaya Municipality. Phaq'u Q'awa lies southeast of Wila Qullu.

The river Phaq'u Q'awa (Pacocahua) originates southwest of the mountain. It flows to the north as a right tributary of the Lauca River.

== Name ==
Phaq'u Q'awa derives from Aymara language terms phaq'u, paqu, or p'aqu meaning the color light brown, reddish, fair-haired, or dark chestnut, and q'awa meaning little river, ditch, crevice, fissure, or gap in the earth, the name thus meaning "brown brook" or "brown ravine". The Hispanicized spelling is Pacocahua or Pajojañua.
