= Wila Pukarani =

Volcano in Bolivia

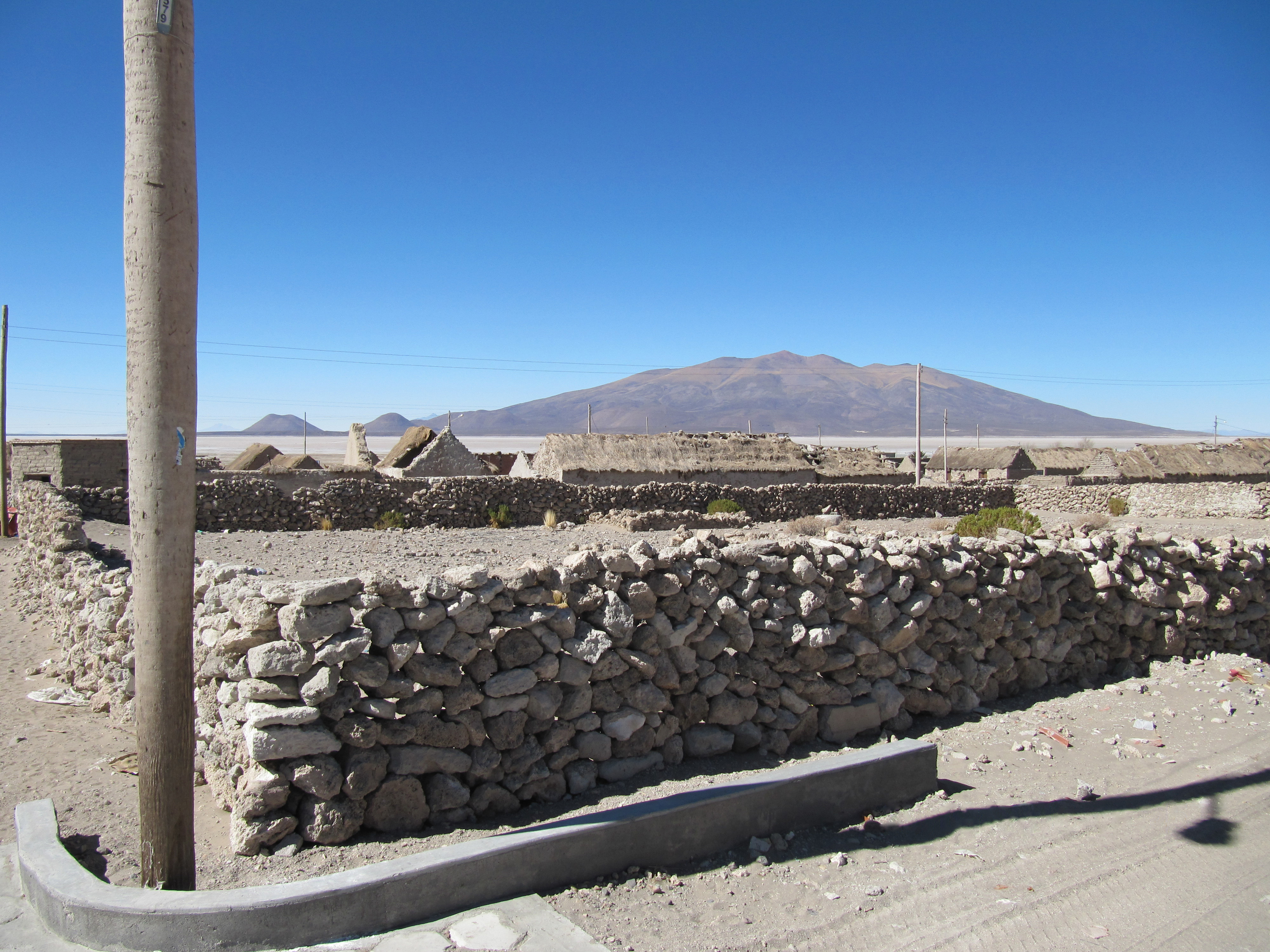
- Wila Pukarani as seen from Witalina

Highest point
- Elevation: 4,920 m (16,140 ft)
- Coordinates: 19°19′50″S 68°18′35″W

Geography
- Location within Bolivia
- Location: Bolivia, Oruro Department, Sabaya Province, Coipasa Municipality
- Parent range: Andes

Wila Pukarani (Aymara wila red or blood, pukara pucará (fortress) or mountain of protection, -ni Aymara suffix to indicate ownership, "the one with a red pukara", Hispanicized spellings Vila Pucarani / Villa Pucarani) is a volcano located in the Coipasa salt pan in the Bolivian Altiplano. It is approximately 4,920 m high, reaching a prominence of at least 1,200 m. It is situated in the Oruro Department, Sabaya Province, Coipasa Municipality.

The town of Coipasa lies on its northeastern side. An age of 3.7 million years has been inferred from the erosion status of the mountain, which shows evidence of Pleistocene glaciation.

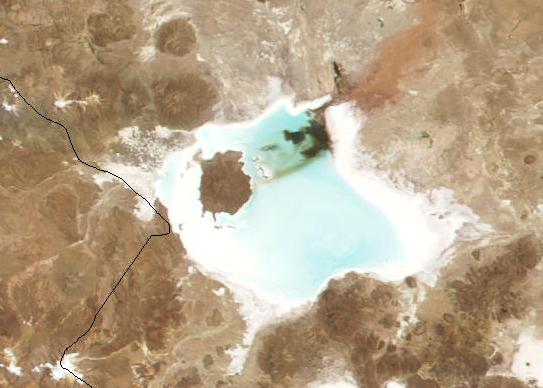
Wila Pukarani surrounded by Coipasa salt pan

== See also ==
- Lauca River
