= Millunu =

Inactive volcano in Chile

Millunu is an inactive volcano in Chile.

Millunu is part of a complex of stratovolcanoes which straddles the border between Bolivia and Chile and covers a surface area of about 60 square kilometres (23 sq mi). Radiometric dates of this complex include 8.3, 7.2, 4.8 and 3.4 million years ago.

The volcano is constructed by dacite and pyroxene or hornblende andesite. These form lava flows or pyroclastic flows which were exposed by a large explosive event in the western flank. The slopes are also covered with a large amount of lava flows, including a 5 kilometres (3.1 mi) broad dacite lava flow on the eastern flank.
