= Taypi Qullu (Sabaya) =

Mountain in Bolivia

- Location within Bolivia

Highest point
- Elevation: 4,600 m (15,100 ft)
- Coordinates: 18°54′43″S 68°52′38″W

Geography
- Location: Bolivia, Oruro Department, Sabaya Province
- Parent range: Andes, Cordillera Occidental

Taypi Qullu (Aymara taypi center, middle, qullu mountain, "center mountain", Hispanicized spelling Taypi Kkollu) is a mountain in the Cordillera Occidental in the Andes of Bolivia, about 4,600 metres (15,092 ft) high. It is located in the Oruro Department, Sabaya Province, Sabaya Municipality, Parajaya Canton, near the border with Chile. Taypi Qullu lies south-east of the mountain Lliscaya and south-west of the mountains Laram Pukara and Kimsa Chata.
