= Pumiri =

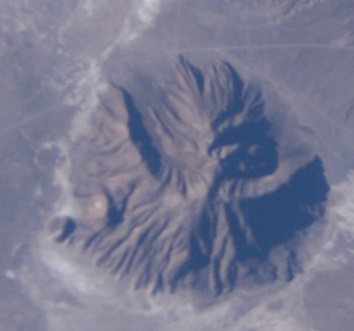
- Pumiri as seen from space

Highest point
- Elevation: 4,862 m (15,951 ft)
- Coordinates: 19°00′00″S 68°26′00″W

Geography
- Location within Bolivia
- Location: Bolivia, Oruro Department, Sabaya Province
- Parent range: Andes

Pumiri is a 4,862-metre-high (15,951 ft) volcano in the Andes that rises 1,062 metres (3,484 ft) above the surrounding terrain. The volcano is located in the Oruro Department, Sabaya Province, northwest of the Salar de Coipasa.

The volcano is formed from two volcanic cones. The younger of which may be of Holocene age and is constructed in the middle of a caldera marked by a semilunar shape. Thanks to heavy erosion, lavas and eruption products are mostly found in peripheral parts of the edifice, while in the central area a deep-grounded crystalline core is exposed. A breach 3.5 kilometres (2.2 mi) wide and 5.5 kilometres (3.4 mi) long with an azimuth of 139° lies in the volcano, whose summit has a maximum slope of 25°. The volcano forms a lineament with Saxani and Isluga.

The creeks named Qhamiña (Camiña) and on the western side Waywasi (Guayhuase) originate on the volcano. Sulfur deposits on the volcano were exploited by indigenous people.
