= Jinchupalla =

Mountain in Bolivia

- Location within Bolivia

Highest point
- Elevation: 4,189 m (13,743 ft)
- Coordinates: 18°37′44″S 68°39′38″W

Geography
- Location: Bolivia; Oruro Department, Sabaya Province, Sabaya Municipality
- Parent range: Andes

Jinchupalla (Aymara jinchu ear, pallaña to collect, "collect ears") is a 4,189-metre-high (13,743 ft) mountain in the Andes of Bolivia. It is located in the Oruro Department, Sabaya Province, Sabaya Municipality, south of the Lauca River.

West of Jinchupalla there are two craters named Jach'a P'iya ("big hole", Jachcha Phiya) and Jisk'a P'iya ("little hole", Jiskha Phiya). They are situated north of Wila Jaqhi (Wila Jakke) and a complex called Volcán Apagado (Spanish for "extinct volcano") or Volcán Quemado (Spanish for "burnt volcano").
