= Chutinza =

Inactive volcano in South America

Coordinates: 20.9108°S 68.5642°W

Chutinza is a 5,184 metres (17,008 ft) high inactive volcano in the Andes, part of the Millunu volcanic complex. In the first stage of its activity, andesite and dacite lava flows with minor pyroclastic components generated a stratovolcano with a crater named Cerro Chutinza Viejo on its northeastern side. Later, lava domes were erupted from the crater (Cerro Tangani), the western flank (Cerro Paja Redonda with a 2 kilometres (1.2 mi) long lava flow) and Cerro Cota 4735.
