= Arintica =

Mountain in Chile

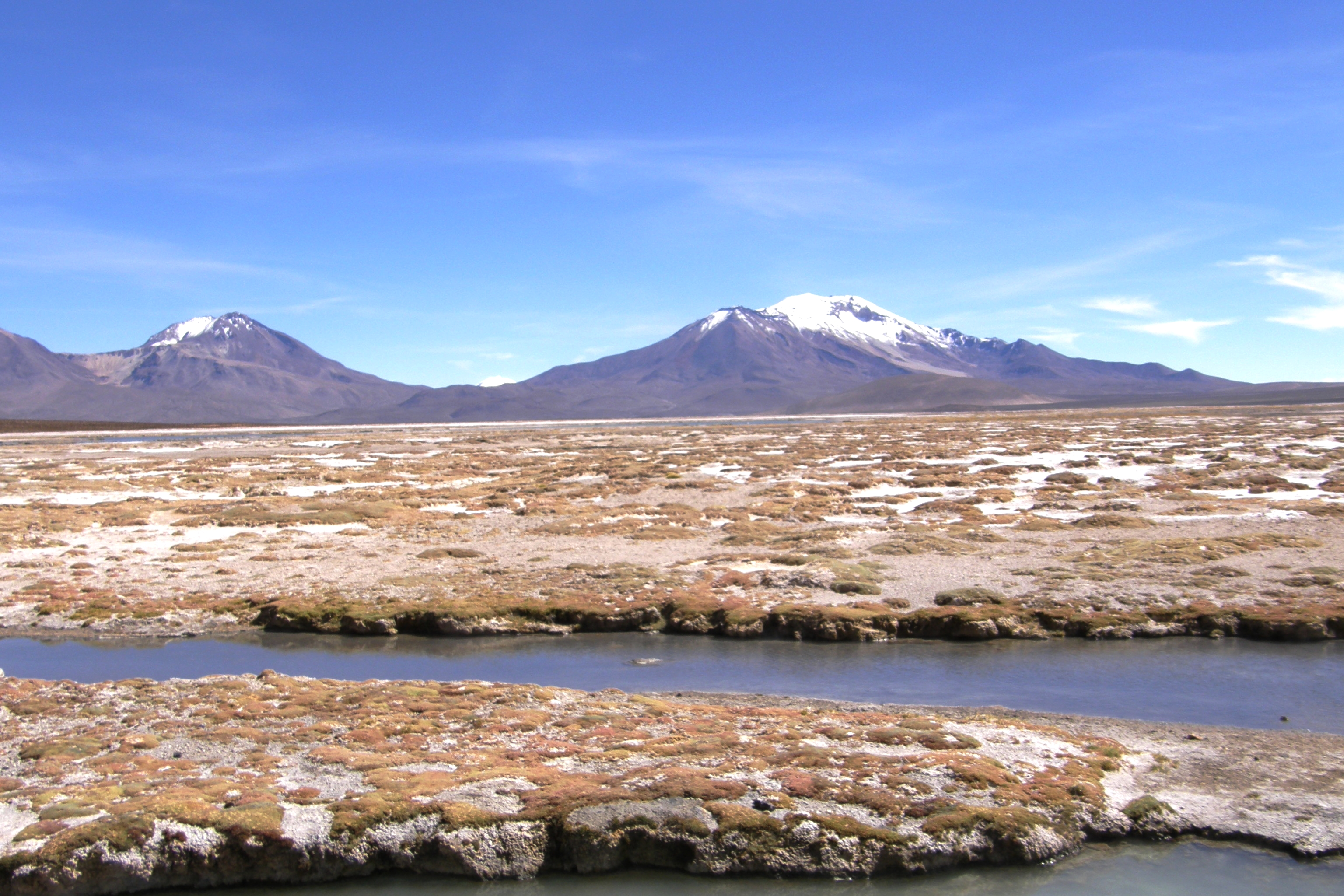
- Arintica (left) and Pukintika (right) as seen from Polloquere hot springs area.

Highest point
- Elevation: 5,597 m (18,363 ft)
- Coordinates: 18°44′50″S 69°04′00″W

Geography
- Location: Chile
- Parent range: Andes

Geology
- Mountain type: Stratovolcano
- Last eruption: Unknown

Arintica is a stratovolcano located in Arica y Parinacota Region of Chile, near the border with Bolivia. It lies north of the Salar de Surire.

== Geomorphology and geology ==
5,597 metres (18,363 ft) high Arintica lies north of the Salar de Surire. To the east lies another volcano, Pukintika, which is higher with 5,780 metres (18,960 ft). The volcano has a main summit in the north, a slightly shorter southern summit and a subsidiary peak in the west. A glacier valley lies between the summits. The main summits, Cerro Calajalata and a second subsidiary mountain form a northeast-southwest trending ridge. The height of the snowline is 5,590 metres (18,340 ft). Stage II moraines found on Arintica have altitudes ranging from 4,350 metres (14,270 ft) on the southern flank to 4,550 metres (14,930 ft) on the eastern flank. On the western flank they reach altitudes of 4,400 metres (14,400 ft). In total, five glaciers surrounded Arintica and drained into the Salar de Surire. There were still glaciers in 1977. According to a 1996 map, both Arintica and its subsidiary peak Cerro Calajalata to the southwest featured a permanent snow/ice cover. Presently, rock glaciers are active on the mountain. Arintica and Pukintika form the drainage divide between the Salar de Surire and the Lauca River basin; the southern flanks drain into the Salar de Surire and the northern sides through the Rio Paquisa into the Lauca River.

=== Eruption history ===
Potassium-argon dating has yielded an age of 637000±19000 years on rocks from Arintica. The volcano was constructed in two phases and postglacial lava flows have been found by Landsat imagery, but they are unsampled. A previously identified southeastern lava flow has been later identified as a debris avalanche, and other lava flows in the crater are actually rock glaciers. A dacitic lava dome is found southwest of the volcano and is named Calajata. In a 2011 hazard map Arintica was considered a potentially dangerous volcano of Chile. Whether the volcano was active in the Holocene is contentious and there is no indication of historical eruptions. Renewed activity would probably be of small magnitude and only have local impacts.

== Vegetation ==
A belt of Polylepis woods surrounds the volcano. The volcano and its neighbour Pukintika are within the Salar de Surire Natural Monument, a national park that surrounds the Salar de Surire. The natural monument features the breeding sites of several flamingo species and internationally important wetlands, which are listed in the Ramsar Convention.

== Human use ==
The Salar de Surire Natural Monument is a tourist destination. In the past, numerous concessions for sulfur mining were active at Arintica and its neighbour Poquentica.
