= Soledad caldera =

Miocene caldera in Bolivia

Soledad is the name of a caldera in Bolivia of Miocene age. It is currently filled by an ephemeral lake and is associated with the Soledad tuffs and the Esquentaque volcanic complex.

== Geology ==
=== Regional ===
The Altiplano is a basin of Cretaceous-Cenozoic age in Peru and Bolivia and embedded between the Western Cordillera, a Mesozoic-Cenozoic volcanic arc and the Eastern Cordillera which is a Paleozoic fold belt. The development of the Altiplano started during the Neocomian and continued during the Tertiary, with several tectonic episodes resulting in the folding of the rocks.

During the Miocene, intrusive volcanism occurred along the eastern margin of the Altiplano (the Coniri fault) and resulted in the formation of epithermal mineral deposits, which extend from Tiwanaku in the northwest to Oruro in the southeast.

=== Local ===
The Soledad caldera lies northwest of Oruro, between the Desaguadero River and Caracollo.

The caldera is somewhat elongated with dimensions of 14 by 22 kilometres (8.7 mi × 13.7 mi). It contains an ephemeral lake, Lago Soledad, which only fills during wet years and the only in the eastern half of the caldera.

The Soledad tuffs are exposed in particular on the eastern margin of the caldera, where they form dacitic deposits with thicknesses of over 130 metres (430 ft) thickness. These tuffs cover surfaces of about 90–100 square kilometres (35–39 sq mi). They are not very conspicuous in satellite images, whereas on the southern side a group of lava flows forms the more noticeable Esquentaque complex.

=== Composition ===
The Soledad caldera has erupted dacitic material rich in potassium, fitting into the calc-alkaline system. Minerals found within the material include apatite, biotite, hornblende, plagioclase, pyroxene, quartz and sanidine.

== History ==
Radiometric dating has yielded an age of about 5.4 million years ago for the Soledad tuffs. After the emplacement of the tuffs, postcollapse volcanism occurred on the southern side of the caldera and formed the Cerro Esquentaque volcanic complex.

During the Pleistocene glaciations, moraines developed on the volcanic deposits and glaciers grew on the Esquentaque complex. Another volcanic center west of Soledad is about 10 million years older and is probably unrelated to Soledad, although the ring fracture that controlled the emplacement of this volcanic center may have influenced the development of the Soledad caldera as well.
