= Chinchillani (Oruro) =

Mountain in Bolivia

- Location within Bolivia

Highest point
- Elevation: 4,122 m (13,524 ft)
- Coordinates: 18°39′50″S 68°38′04″W

Geography
- Location: Bolivia, Oruro Department, Sabaya Province, Sabaya Municipality
- Parent range: Andes

Chinchillani (Aymara chinchilla a kind of rodent, -ni a suffix, "the one with the chinchillas) is a 4,122-metre-high (13,524 ft) mountain in the Andes of Bolivia. It is located in the Oruro Department, Sabaya Province, Sabaya Municipality, south of the Lauca River in Bolivia.

Northwest of Chinchillani there are two craters named Jach'a P'iya ("big hole", Jachcha Phiya) and Jisk'a P'iya ("little hole", Jiskha Phiya). They lie north of Wila Jaqhi ("red cliff", Wila Jakke) and a complex called Volcán Apagado (Spanish for "extinct volcano") or Volcán Quemado (Spanish for "burnt volcano").
