= Salar de Surire Natural Monument =

- IUCN category III (natural monument or feature)
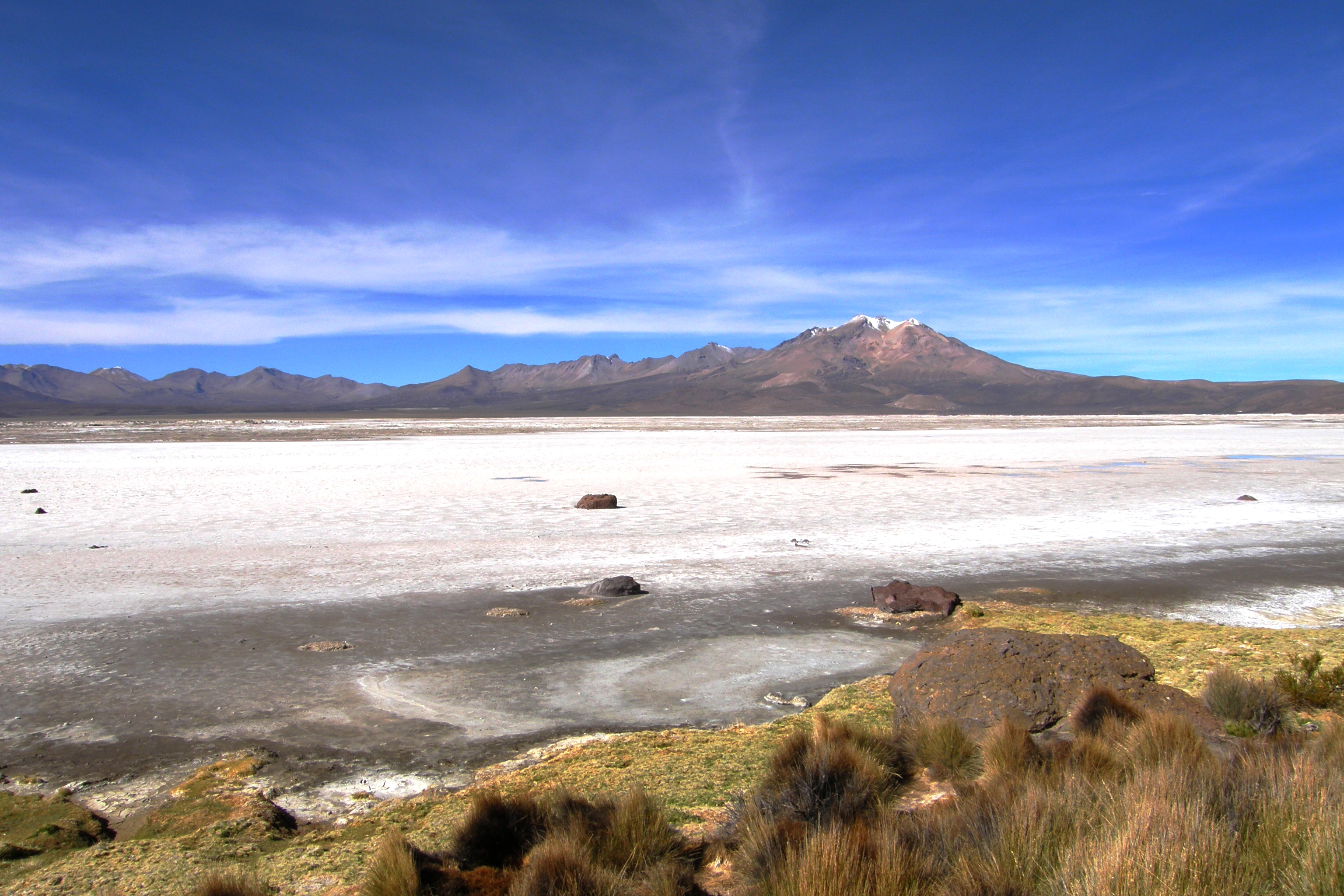
- Interactive map of Salar de Surire Natural Monument
- Location: Arica y Parinacota Region, Chile
- Coordinates: 18°51′0″S 69°0′0″W
- Area: 158.58 km^{2} (61.23 sq mi)
- Governing body: Corporación Nacional Forestal

Ramsar Wetland
- Official name: Salar de Surire
- Designated: 2 December 1996
- Reference no.: 873

Salar de Surire Natural Monument is a Chilean Natural Monument located in the Andes, in the Arica y Parinacota Region. It consists mainly of a salt flat and a number of small salt lakes, sheltering several Andean species of wildlife and plants. Arintica volcano towers over the salt flat.

The protected area, along with Lauca National Park and Las Vicuñas National Reserve, were designated a World Biosphere Reserve by UNESCO in 1981, which is called Lauca.

Salar de Surire is one of the Ramsar Wetlands of International Importance under the Ramsar Convention signed in 1971.

== See also ==
- Pukintika
