= Filippo Porco =

Belgian professional footballer

Filippo Porco (born 24 March 1989) is a Belgian football player who currently plays for R.O.C. de Charleroi-Marchienne.

== Career ==
He played previously for R. Charleroi S.C. in the Belgian First Division, and for Union Royale Namur on loan. His favoured position is in defensive midfield.

Fillippo Porco in the 2010 season is present together with Raffaele Chiarelli in the list of starters from the first team because they always showed up drunk at training, attended Italian bars where they played cards and drank beer and the Charleroi club together with the coach Demol send them on loan in the Belgian 3rd division
