= Cerro Saxani =

Coordinates: 19°8′S 68°25′W

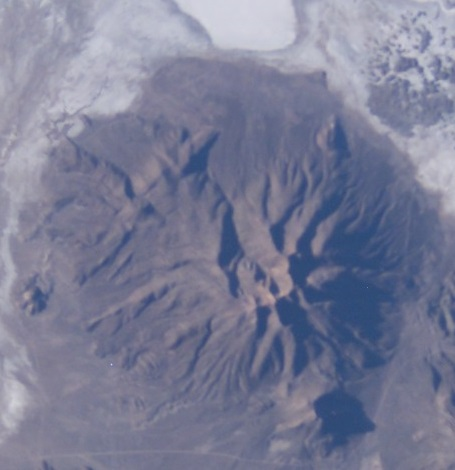
Saxani from space. Salar de Coipasa is the white surface at the top of the image.

Cerro Saxani (also known as Saxani, Sacasani or Sazani) is a volcano in the Bolivian Andes. It is 5,090 metres (16,700 ft) high and a neighbour of Tata Sabaya. It lies north of the Salar de Coipasa.
