= Dos Porcos River =

Dos Porcos River may refer to either of two rivers in Brazil:

- Dos Porcos River (Bahia), a river of Bahia state of eastern Brazil
- Dos Porcos River (Santa Catarina), a river of Santa Catarina state in southeastern Brazil
