= P'isaqiri =

Mountain in Bolivia

- Location within Bolivia

Highest point
- Elevation: 4,648 m (15,249 ft)
- Coordinates: 18°57′24″S 68°40′29″W

Geography
- Location: Bolivia, Oruro Department, Mejillones Province
- Parent range: Andes

P'isaqiri (Aymara p'isaqa Nothoprocta (a kind of bird), -(i)ri a suffix, also spelled Pisakheri) is a 4,648-metre-high (15,249 ft) mountain in the Andes of Bolivia. It is located in the Oruro Department, Mejillones Province, La Rivera Municipality, south-west of Carangas.

== See also ==
- Pukara
