= Yapu Qullu (Mejillones) =

Mountain in Bolivia

- Location within Bolivia

Highest point
- Elevation: 4,418 m (14,495 ft)
- Coordinates: 18°52′58″S 68°39′06″W

Geography
- Location: Bolivia, Oruro Department, Mejillones Province
- Parent range: Andes

Yapu Qullu (Aymara yapu field, qullu mountain, "field mountain", also spelled Yapu Kkollu) is a 4,418-metre-high (14,495 ft) mountain in the Andes of Bolivia. It is located in the Oruro Department, Mejillones Province, Carangas Municipality, northwest of Carangas.
