= Tata Sabaya =

Volcano in Bolivia

Coordinates: 19°08′S 68°32′W

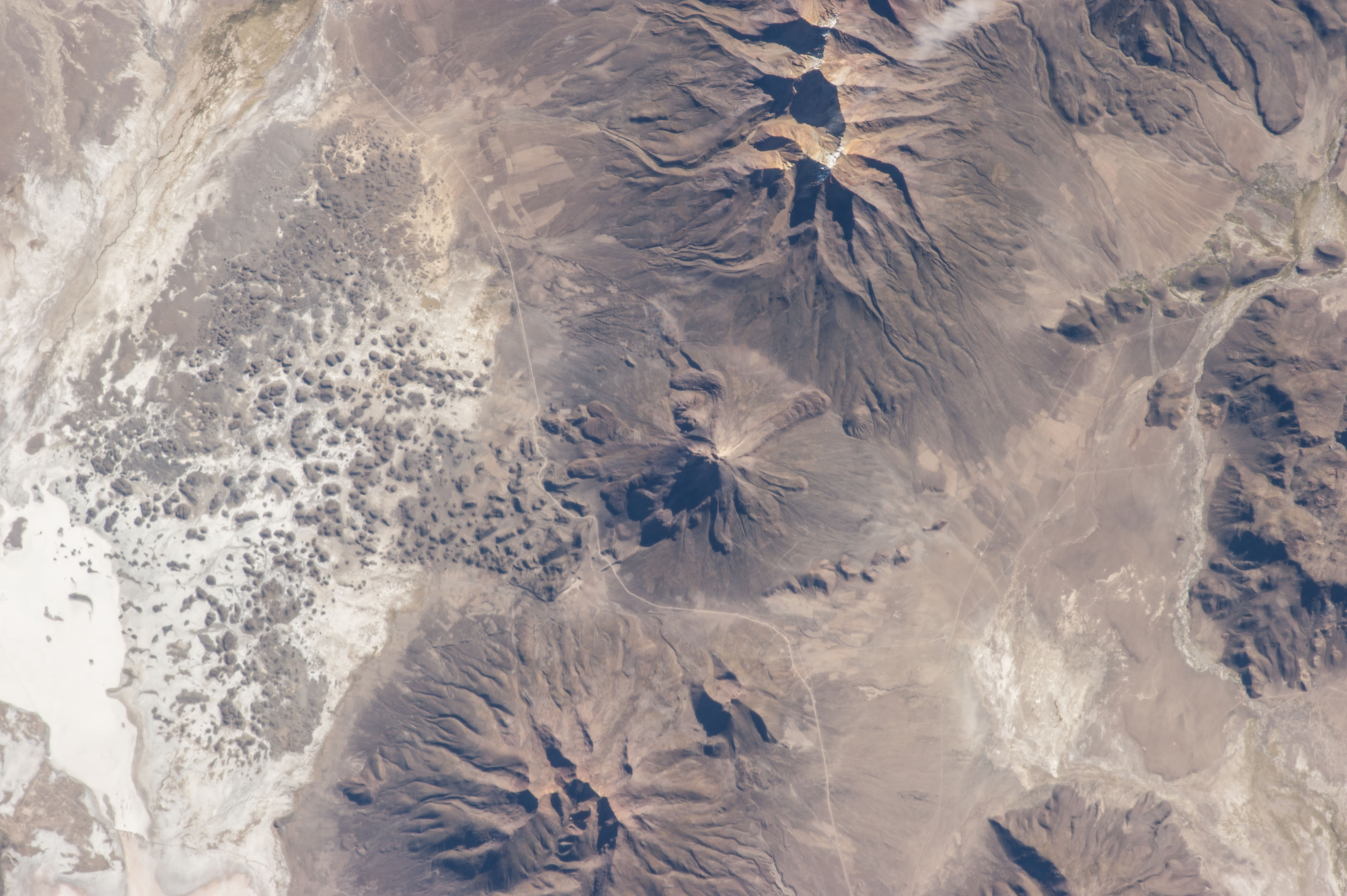

Highest point
- Elevation: 5,430 m (17,810 ft)

Geography
- Location within Bolivia

Tata Sabaya is a 5,430-metre (17,810 ft) high volcano in Bolivia. It is part of the Central Volcanic Zone, one of several volcanic belts in the Andes which are separated by gaps without volcanic activity. This section of the Andes was volcanically active since the Jurassic, with an episode of strong ignimbritic volcanism occurring during the Miocene. Tata Sabaya lies in a thinly populated region north of the Salar de Coipasa salt pan.

Volcanic activity at Tata Sabaya and elsewhere in the Central Volcanic Zone is the consequence of the subduction of the Nazca Plate beneath the South America Plate. The volcano has developed along a lineament that separates older crust north of the lineament from younger crust in the south, and the edifice has been formed by andesitic rocks.

The southern flank of Tata Sabaya failed during the latest Pleistocene about 12,000–12,360 years before present. Debris from the collapse entered a lake that covered the Salar de Coipasa at that time and formed a deposit with a volume of 6 ± 1 cubic kilometre (1.44 ± 0.24 cu mi). Subsequently, the collapse scar was partly filled in with more recent lava flows and lava domes; one eruption occurred about 6,000 years before present.

== Geography and geomorphology ==
Tata Sabaya lies just north of the Salar de Coipasa in Bolivia. The small village of Pagador lies west-southwest of the volcano, but the whole region is overall thinly inhabited. The name means "Father Sabaya"; the term "Sabaya" may be the Aymara corruption of the Quechua term for "devil", "demon". The volcano, which features a summit sanctuary, is a topic in local myths, where it is sometimes personified, and subject of a ritual involving it and neighbouring volcanoes.

Tata Sabaya is part of the Central Volcanic Zone of the Andes, which consists of a volcanic arc that mainly follows the Western Cordillera. There are about 44 Holocene volcanoes, however the remoteness of the region and dry climate has restricted scientific research of these volcanoes; among the better known are Lastarria, the Nevados de Payachata, Ollagüe, San Pablo, San Pedro and Socompa.

Tata Sabaya is a volcano which reaches a height of 5,430 metres (17,810 ft). Five lava flows extend north from the summit and display levees and flow fronts, the flows reaching a maximum length of 2 kilometres (1.2 mi). The top of these flows is cut by a collapse scar that extends east and west of the edifice in the form of scarps up to 50 metres (160 ft) high. The space between the scarps is in turn filled by more recent lava flows with a blocky appearance. Farther away of the edifice, the scarp is more noticeable and reaches a height of about 200 metres (660 ft) on the southeastern side of the volcano.

A 300-square-kilometre (120 sq mi) large deposit south of the volcano, originally interpreted as a nuee ardente deposit, is actually a landslide deposit which extends over a length of 20 kilometres (12 mi) and a width of 7 kilometres (4.3 mi); its volume is about 6 ± 1 cubic kilometre (1.44 ± 0.24 cu mi). The landslide incorporated material from the salar, and its rocks reflect in part the layering and structure of the pre-collapse volcano. The deposit is one of the more conspicuous of its type, to the point that it was observed and identified on low-resolution Landsat images. It consists of material that forms hummock-like deposits, with individual hummocks becoming smaller the farther away from the edifice they are. The deposit extends into the Salar de Coipasa where it is confined by faults and is in part covered by lacustrine sediments such as tufa.

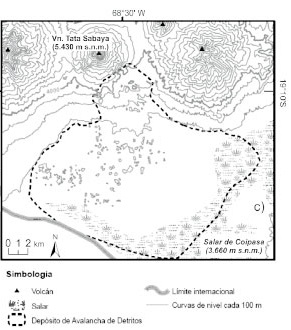
Outline of the debris avalanche

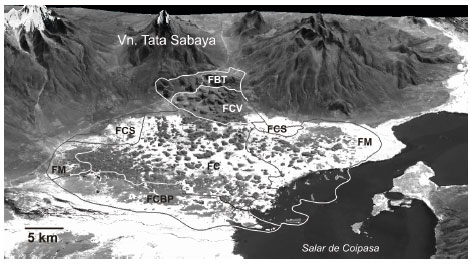
Debris avalanche profile

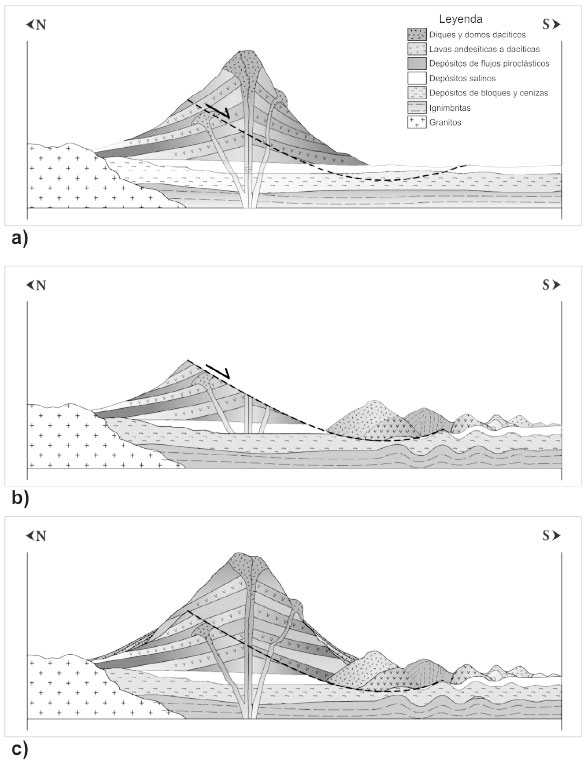
Profile of volcano development

== Geology ==
Off the western coast of South America, the Nazca Plate subducts beneath the South America Plate at a rate of about 10 centimetres per year (3.9 in/year). This subduction process is responsible for the volcanism in the Andean Volcanic Belt, which occurs in a Northern Volcanic Zone in Ecuador and Colombia, a Central Volcanic Zone in Peru, Bolivia, Chile and Argentina and a Southern Volcanic Zone in Chile and Argentina. These volcanic zones are separated by gaps without volcanism, where the subduction process is shallower.

Several phases of tectonic and volcanic activity have been identified in the Central Volcanic Zone. An earlier phase of volcanism in the Cordillera de la Costa commenced in the Jurassic but is considered separate from the Central Volcanic Zone magmatism proper. After an erosional hiatus during the Oligocene, volcanic arc activity increased during the Miocene and culminated in a phase of strong ignimbrite eruptions, which originated in calderas. This phase was associated with a substantial thickening of the crust in the Central Andes. During the Pleistocene ignimbrite volcanism waned again and stratovolcanoes began to develop.

Tata Sabaya lies along a crustal transition area which separates a younger crust farther south from an older (Proterozoic) crust in the north, which is made up by the Chilenia terrane and the Arequipa-Antofalla craton, respectively. This transition area appears to coincide with a chain of volcanoes that Tata Sabaya is part of and which extends from Cerro Saxani in the east to Isluga in Chile, as well as with the northern end of the Pica gap where no recent volcanism occurs in the volcanic arc.

The basement of the volcano is formed by the ignimbritic Altos de Pica formation, although outcrops of granite have been observed in the region; one of these outcrops may be a Precambrian granite subsequently thermally modified in the Toarcian. This basement is covered by younger volcanic rocks, alluvium and sediments of the Salar de Coipasa. Seismic tomography suggests that molten magma exists in the regional crust.

=== Composition ===
Tata Sabaya has produced "two-pyroxene" andesite and porphyritic andesite. Minerals contained within the rock are augite, biotite, hornblende, hypersthene, plagioclase and titanomagnetite with only little variation between rocks erupted during separate stages of volcanic activity. The erupted volcanites define a potassium-rich calc-alkaline suite. Inclusions of more mafic (Note: A volcanic rock relatively rich in iron and magnesium, relative to silicium.) rocks in the erupted material may indicate that mafic magma was injected into the magma chamber of Tata Sabaya. The magma genesis at Tata Sabaya has been explained with magma mixing processes, which gave rise to a fairly uniform composition of the eruption products.

== Climate and vegetation ==
The region is dry with precipitation mainly falling during southern hemisphere summer, and has little vegetation cover. Polylepis tarapacana trees grow on the slopes of Tata Sabaya; these trees form the highest woodlands in the world. Other aspects of regional vegetation are the so-called puna steppe, which is characterized by grass and shrub vegetation.

== Eruption history ==
Of all volcanoes in Bolivia, Tata Sabaya is the only one with Holocene activity which is not on the border with another country. The young age of the mountain has been inferred from the lack of glaciation and moraines on the mountain, unlike neighbouring summits.

The earliest activity at Tata Sabaya constructed a pyroclastic shield, which crops out as a 20-metre (66 ft) thick sequence of block-and-ash flows fallout deposits and pumice deposits in the northern sector of the volcano. Effusive eruptions then built up a volcanic cone on top of this shield; the five northerly lava flows were emplaced during this phase of activity. Some lava flows from this stage were unstable and collapsed, covering the northern parts of the volcano with debris.

This effusive activity eventually oversteepened the cone, causing its southern sector to collapse. During this collapse and landsliding, large toreva blocks developed from sectors of the cone which slid down undeformed, while other material from the cone formed the hummocks in the sector collapse deposit; there was no explosive eruption at the time of the collapse. The configuration of the deposit indicates that the debris entered the Salar when it was filled with water; the height of the tufa deposits imply that water levels were about 3,700 metres (12,100 ft) above sea level. This and the lake terraces that the landslide overran marks the collapse as synchronous with the Lake Tauca episode 12,000-12,360 years ago when water levels in the Salar de Coipasa reached their maximum. The onset of such collapses on volcanoes is often determined by faulting, climate change or eruption of the volcano; at Tata Sabaya earthquakes and the injection of new magma has been invoked to explain the destabilization of the edifice.

After the collapse, Holocene activity filled the scar with lava domes and lava flows, cancelling the traces of the collapse; some of these in turn collapsed as well and gave rise to hot avalanche deposits. Radiocarbon dating for a pyroclastic flow has yielded an age of 6,000 years before present, implying that the volcano may be still active. Reportedly, when in 1600 Huaynaputina erupted in Peru a volcano named Sabaya erupted in Oruro and destroyed a village.
