= Porco (caldera) =

Coordinates: 19°50′S 66°00′W

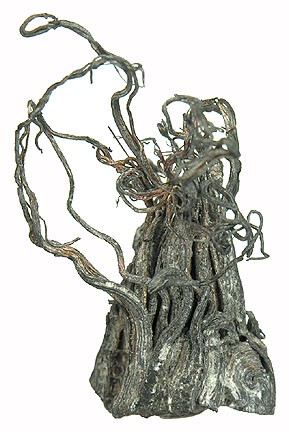
Silver mined at Porco

Porco caldera is a caldera in Bolivia which contains a major deposit of lead, silver, tin, and zinc ore. This caldera was formed by a volcanic eruption 12 million years ago in the Bolivian Cordillera Oriental. Subsequent to the caldera collapse, volcanic intrusions occurred as many as 3 million years after the caldera formation.

Ore deposits form veins within the caldera infill. These ores were mined for silver as early as the Inca period; more recently, Porco is the site of zinc mining.

== Geography and geomorphology ==
Porco lies in southwestern Bolivia in the Cordillera Oriental, close to the towns of Agua de Castilla and Porco. The jagged, wind-swept landscape lies at an elevation of 4,000 metres (13,000 ft).

Porco consists of a caldera with a diameter of 5 by 3 kilometres (3.1 mi × 1.9 mi). The caldera formed along a ring fault and was enlarged by subsequent landslides of its oversteepened margins into a bowl-shaped depression. The rims of the caldera are particularly conspicuous on its northern side and form a recognizable scarp on the northeastern side. The caldera contains two hills in its southern part, 4,886 metres (16,030 ft) high Cerro Apo Porco and 4,528 metres (14,856 ft) high Huayna Porco. Both of these hills are intrusive stocks; other smaller intrusions are found elsewhere in the caldera and some may be exposed feeder dikes of now eroded lava domes.

The basement of the caldera is formed by phyllite rocks of Ordovician age, which in turn are overlaid by the Cretaceous Toro Toro formation, which consists of sandstone.

Porco is found at the southern margin of the Los Frailes volcanic field, a large ignimbrite field that extends from Potosi in the east as much as 100 kilometres (62 mi) to the Altiplano in the west. This ignimbrite field was erupted between 6–9 million years ago from a number of vents and consists of dacite and rhyolite ash-flow tuffs. Porco was at first considered to be part of the Los Frailes field, but in 1964 it was found to be a distinct volcanic system.

The Porco tuff is of dacitic composition. It contains abundant crystals and phenocrysts of biotite, plagioclase, quartz, and sanidine. Close to the Apo Porco and Huayna Porco hills, the tuff has been altered to varying degrees, forming propylite and sericite. A number of individual veins of ore rock cross-cut the Porco tuff and have names such as Cerro Milagro vein system, Larga vein, Panfilo vein, and San Antonio vein. Ore minerals include acanthite, arsenopyrite, cassiterite, cerussite, galena, limonite, pyragyrite, pyrite, semseyite, sphalerite, stannite, and stephanite.

The climate is cold and dry, with temperatures below 0 °C (32 °F) occurring in ten months. Precipitation is low, amounting to about 200 millimetres per year (7.9 in/year).

== Eruption history ==
Twelve million years ago, the Porco Tuff was erupted from the volcano, causing the formation of the Porco caldera. This welded tuff accumulated to thicknesses of more than 370 metres (1,210 ft) inside the caldera and extended outside of the caldera, where it crops out in patches outside of its western margin. Material from the pre-caldera basement consisting of Cretaceous sandstone breccia was embedded in the tuff on the southern and eastern side of the caldera. Porco is also considered to be the source of the Cebadillas ignimbrite.

The Huayna Porco hill formed about the same time as the caldera, 12.1 ± 0.4 million years ago, while Apo Porco is more recent, of 8.6 ± 0.3 million years. The formation of these hills coincided with hydrothermal alteration of the Porco tuff contained in the caldera; the 3 million year gap between the Porco tuff and the Apo Porco intrusion suggests that the intrusion was a distinct magmatic event, probably part of the Los Frailes volcanism.

== Mining ==
Silver mining at Porco occurred already during pre-Columbian times. For example, the silver in the Coricancha temple of Cuzco originated at Porco. In fact, Porco was the major silver source for the Inca, and consequently their government heavily intervened in the region. Even after the Inca, Porco was a major source of silver for the Spanish. Later additional ores of lead, tin, and zinc were mined at Porco as well, and the mine became Bolivia's largest source of zinc.

As of 1993, 2,100,000 tonnes (2,100,000 long tons; 2,300,000 short tons) of ore reserves existed at Porco, this ore containing 1.5% lead, 175 grams per tonne (6.3 oz/long ton) silver, and 15% zinc. Gold also occurs at Porco, but not in quantities that would justify mining it.
