= Laram Pukara =

Mountain in Bolivia

- Location within Bolivia

Highest point
- Elevation: 5,292 m (17,362 ft)
- Coordinates: 18°53′59″S 68°49′10″W

Geography
- Location: Bolivia, Oruro Department, Mejillones Province
- Parent range: Andes, Cordillera Occidental

Laram Pukara (Aymara larama blue, pukara fortress / mountain of protection, "blue fortress" or "blue mountain of protection", Hispanicized spelling Laram Pucara, labeled Larani Pacara in the BIGM map) is a 5,292-metre-high (17,362 ft) mountain in the Cordillera Occidental in the Andes of Bolivia. It is located in the Oruro Department, Mejillones Province, La Rivera Municipality. Laram Pukara lies south-east of the mountain Kimsa Chata and north-east of the mountain Taypi Qullu.
