= Churi Qullu (Bolivia) =

Mountain in Bolivia

- Location within Bolivia

Highest point
- Elevation: 4,324 m (14,186 ft)
- Coordinates: 18°58′32″S 68°35′36″W

Geography
- Location: Bolivia, Oruro Department, Mejillones Province
- Parent range: Andes

Churi Qullu (Aymara churi dull yellow, qullu mountain, "dull yellow mountain", also spelled Churi Kkollu) is a 4,324-metre-high (14,186 ft) mountain in the Andes of Bolivia. It is located in the Oruro Department, Mejillones Province, Carangas Municipality, southeast of Carangas.
