= Chipaya (village) =

Village in Bolivia

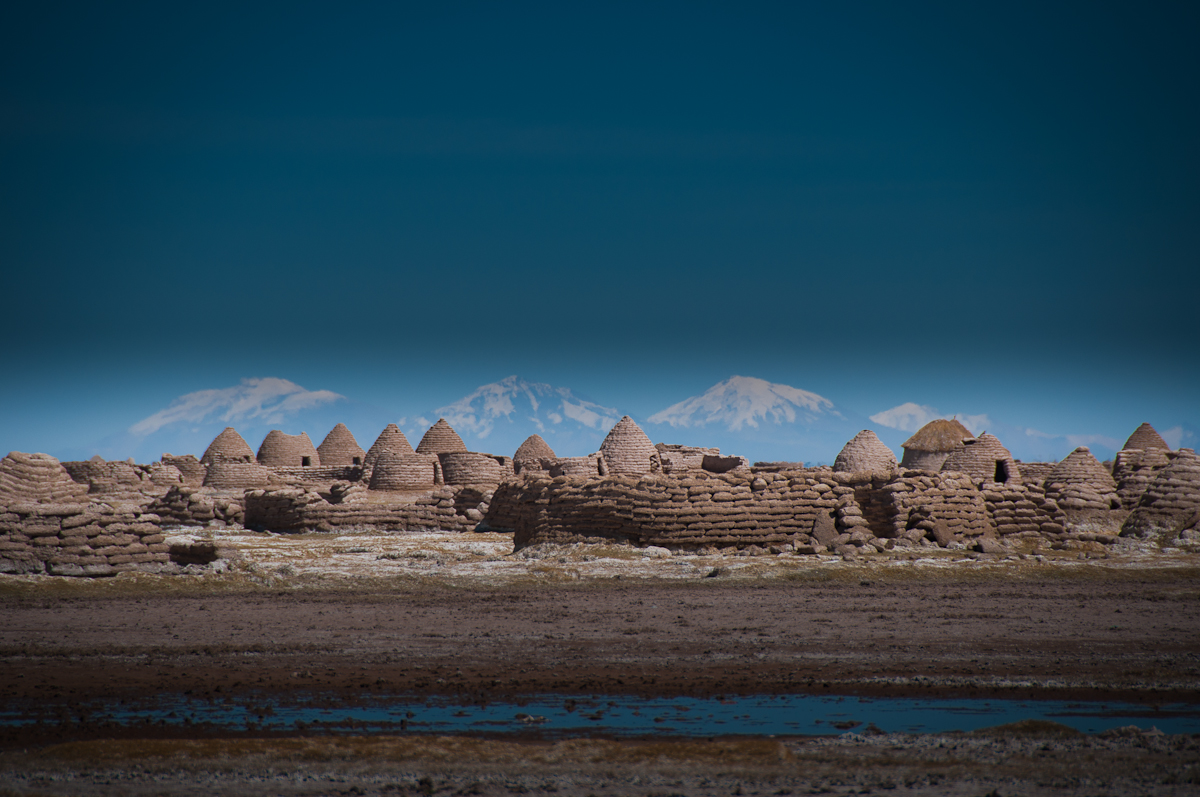
- The ancient Chipaya village
- Interactive map of Chipaya
- Coordinates: 19°03′S 68°05′W
- Country: Bolivia
- Department: Oruro
- Province: Sabaya Province
- Municipality: Chipaya Municipality

Population (2001)
  - Total: 363
- Time zone: UTC-4 (BOT)

Chipaya is a village in Bolivia located in the Sabaya Province (formerly Atahuallpa Province) of the Oruro Department. It is the seat of the Chipaya Municipality. In 2001 it had a population of 363. The village is situated in a remote area northeast of Lake Coipasa where the people have maintained special elements of their culture.

Chipaya was declared a National Monument by Supreme Decrete No. 8171 on December 7, 1967.

== Climate ==
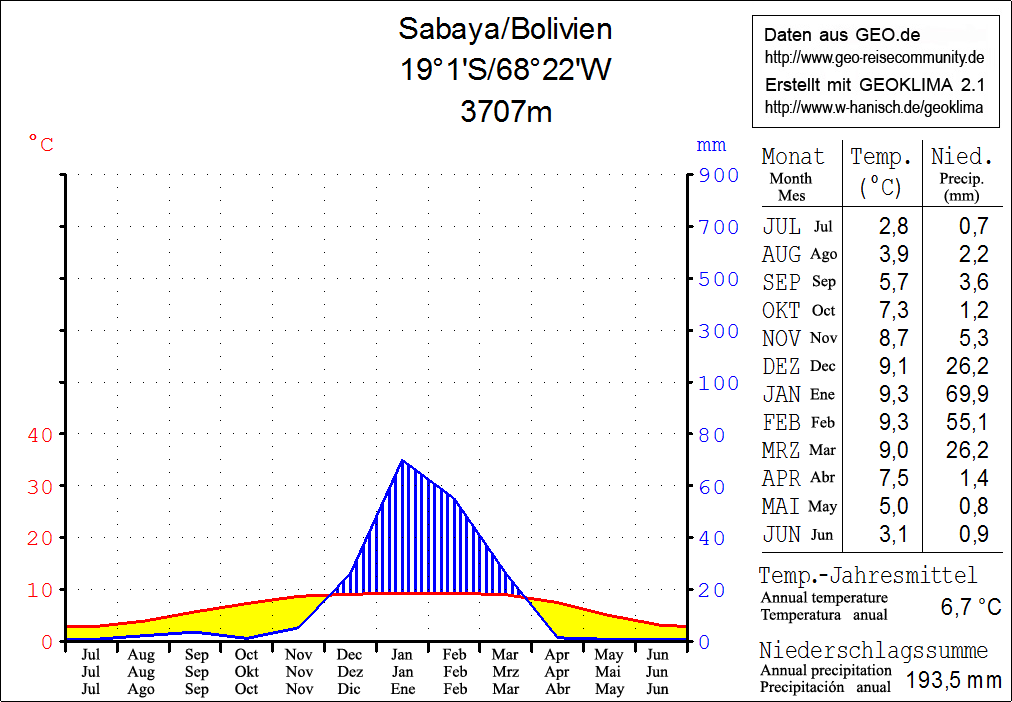
Climate chart of the Sabaya Province in the Walter and Lieth format, metric, °Celsius und millimeters

== See also ==
- Chipaya language
- Rainy season in the Altiplano
- Uru–Chipaya languages
