= Kimsa Chata (Sabaya) =

Mountain in Bolivia

- Location within Bolivia

Highest point
- Elevation: 5,245 m (17,208 ft)
- Coordinates: 18°53′00″S 68°51′52″W

Geography
- Location: Bolivia, Oruro Department, Sabaya Province
- Parent range: Andes

Kimsa Chata (Aymara and Quechua kimsa three, Pukina chata mountain, "three mountains", Hispanicized spelling Quimsa Chata) is a 5,245-metre-high (17,208 ft) mountain in the Andes of Bolivia. It is located in the Oruro Department, Sabaya Province, Sabaya Municipality, Negrillos Canton. It lies south-east of the mountain Qillwiri, east of Lliscaya, north-east of Taypi Qullu and north-west of the Laram Pukara, near the border with Chile.
