= Coipasa Lake =

Lake and associated salida in Bolivia

Lago Coipasa
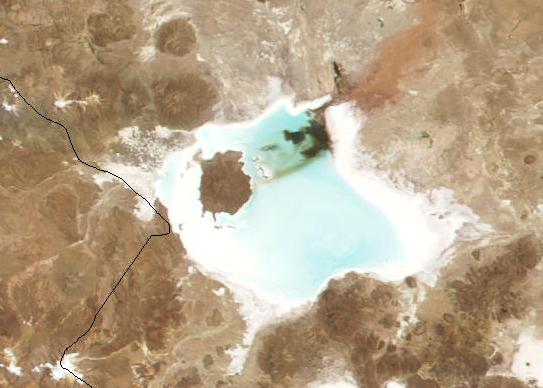

- Location within Bolivia Location within South America
- Interactive map of Lago Coipasa
- Location: Sabaya Province, Oruro Department
- Coordinates: 19°12′S 68°07′W
- Primary inflows: Río Lauca
- Basin countries: Bolivia
- Surface area: 806 km^{2} (311 sq mi)
- Max. depth: 3.5 m (11 ft)
- Surface elevation: 3,657 m (11,998 ft)

Lago Coipasa is a lake in Sabaya Province, Oruro Department, Bolivia. At an elevation of 3657 m, its surface area is 806 km². It is located on the western part of Altiplano, 20 km north of Salar de Uyuni and south of the main road linking Oruro and Huara (Chile).

Lake Coipasa is a tectonic saline lake with a depth of 3.5 metres that is surrounded by the Salar de Coipasa ("Coipasa Salt Flats"), and dominated by the volcanic cone of the 4,920 m high Wila Pukarani.

Thousands of flamingos have settled on the shores of Lake Coipasa.

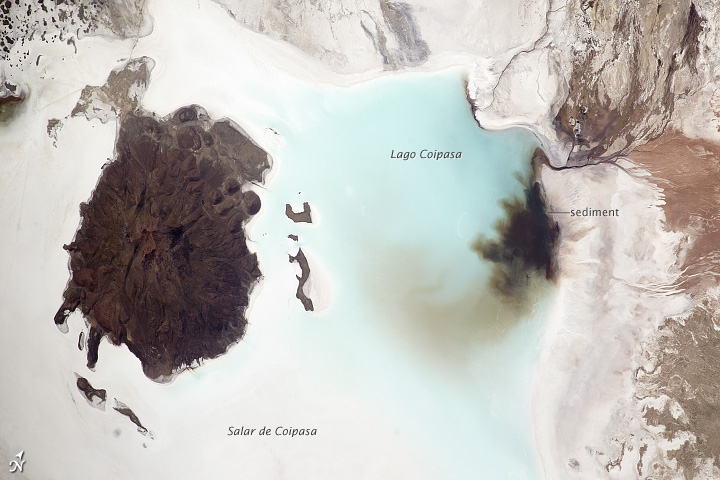
Coipasa Lake

== Gallery ==
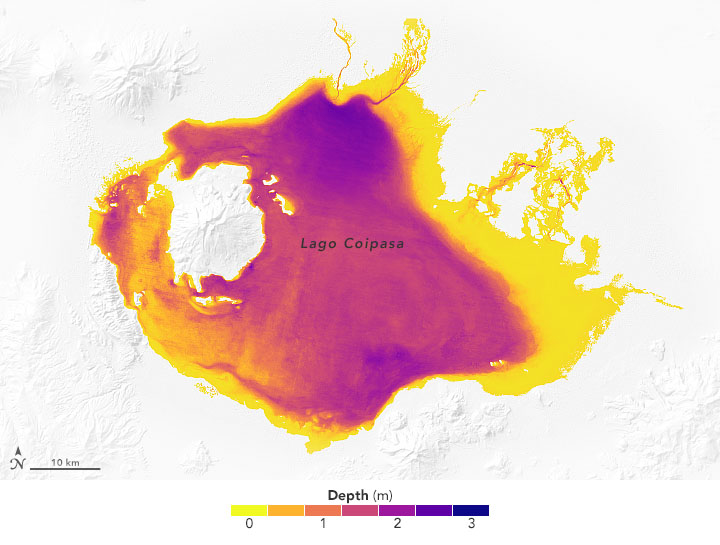
Map of the shape and depth (bathymetry) of the Coipasa lake, 2020

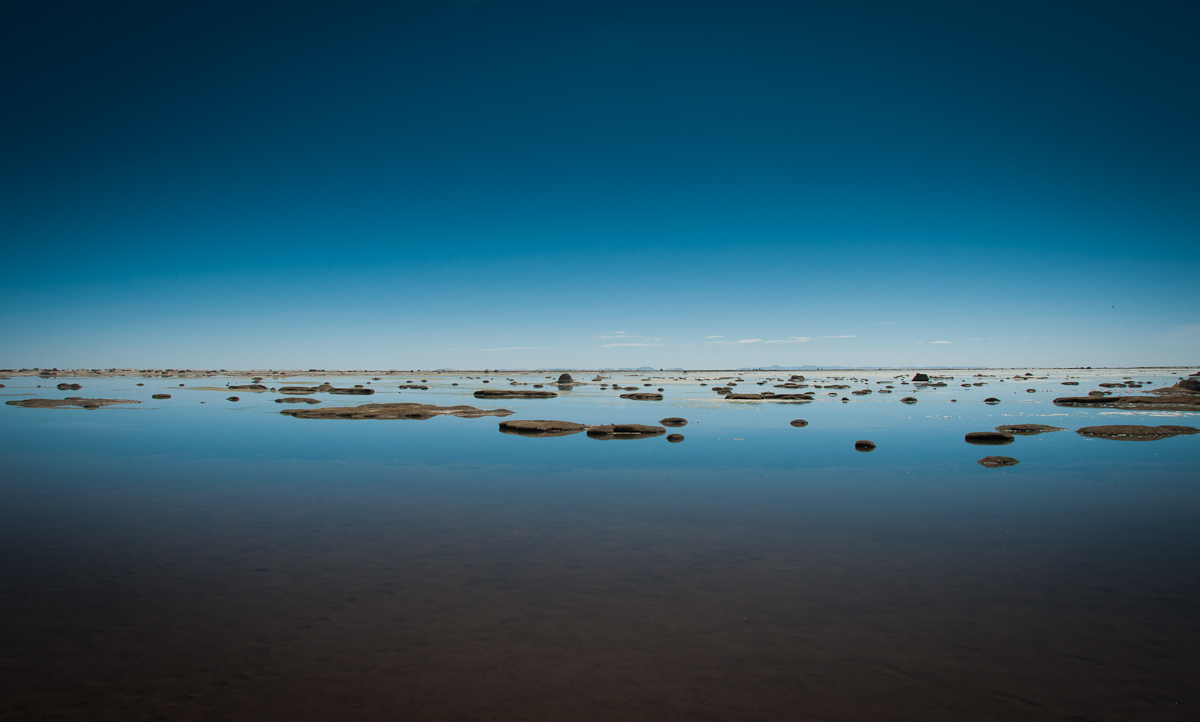
The lake

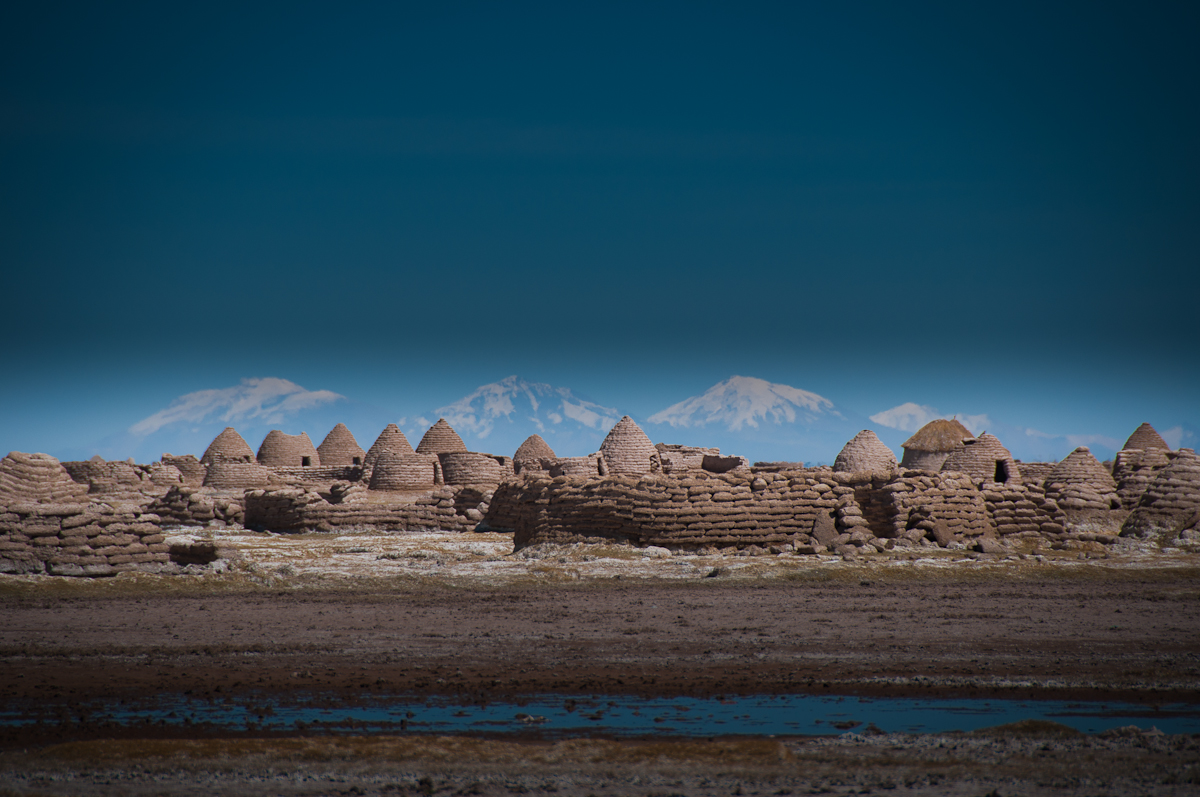
The village of Chipaya, Oruro, Bolivia, near the lake

== See also ==
- Chipaya
- Rainy season in the Altiplano
- Ouki
