= Janq'u Jaqhi (Totora) =

Mountain in the Andes of Bolivia

- Location within Bolivia

Highest point
- Elevation: 4,120 m (13,520 ft)
- Coordinates: 17°54′21″S 68°12′19″W

Geography
- Location: Bolivia, Oruro Department
- Parent range: Andes

Janq'u Jaqhi (Aymara janq'u white, jaqhi precipice, cliff, "white cliff", also spelled Jankho Jakke) is a mountain in the Andes of Bolivia which reaches a height of approximately 4,120 m (13,520 ft). It is located in the Oruro Department, San Pedro de Totora Province. Janq'u Jaqhi lies west of Mañasu and south of Pukara between the Milluri River in the east and the Sulluma River in the west.
