= Jach'a Ch'utu (Oruro) =

Mountain in Bolivia

- Location within Bolivia

Highest point
- Elevation: 4,160 m (13,650 ft)
- Coordinates: 17°54′29″S 68°04′35″W

Geography
- Location: Bolivia, Oruro Department
- Parent range: Andes

Jach'a Ch'utu (Aymara jach'a big, ch'utu peak of a mountain, top of the head, "big peak", also spelled Jachcha Chutu) is a mountain in the Andes of Bolivia which reaches a height of approximately 4,160 m (13,650 ft). It is located in the Oruro Department, San Pedro de Totora Province. Jach'a Ch'utu lies southeast of Yapu Qullu. The Turi Jawira originates east of the mountain. It flows to the Jach'a Jawira ("big river") in the southwest.
