= T'iwu =

Mountain in Bolivia

- Location within Bolivia

Highest point
- Elevation: 4,104 m (13,465 ft)
- Coordinates: 17°52′16″S 68°10′30″W

Geography
- Location: Bolivia, Oruro Department
- Parent range: Andes

T'iwu (Aymara, also spelled Tibo) is a 4,104-metre-high (13,465 ft) mountain in the Andes of Bolivia. It is located in the Oruro Department, San Pedro de Totora Province. T'iwu lies north of Mañasu. The Juch'us Jawira ("slim river") originates south of the mountain. It flows to the northwest.
