= Pukara (disambiguation) =

A pukara (Aymara and Quechua for "fortress", hispanicized spellings pucara, pucará, also pukará) is a pre-Hispanic central Andean fortress.

The Pukara culture was an archaeological culture which developed in Qullaw, along the north-western shore of Lake Titicaca in the Andes mountains.

Pukara may also refer to:

== Fortresses ==
- Pukara, Coporaque, an archaeological site in the Coporaque District, Caylloma Province, Arequipa Region, Peru
- Pucará, Puno, an archaeological site in the Puno Region, Peru, and focus of the Pucará culture of the first centuries AD
- Pukara, Víctor Fajardo, an archaeological site in the Víctor Fajardo Province, Ayacucho Region, Peru
- Pukara, Vilcas Huamán, an archaeological site on top of the mountain Pukara in the Vilcas Huamán Province, Ayacucho Region, Peru
- Chena Pukara in Chile
- Puka Pukara just outside the city of Cusco, Peru
- Waqra Pukara in the Upper Apurímac canyon, Cusco Region, Peru
- Pukará de Quitor, near San Pedro de Atacama, northern Chile
- Pukará de Lasana in Chile
- Pucara del Cerro La Muralla in Chile
- Pukara de La Compañia in Chile
- Pucará de Tilcara in Argentina

== Places ==
- Pucará Canton in Ecuador and its capital
- Pucará District, Huancayo, a district in the Junín Region, Peru and its capital
- Pucará District, Jaén, a district in the Cajamarca Region, Peru and its capital
- Pucará District, Lampa, a district in the Puno Region, Peru and its capital
- Pucará, Vallegrande, a town in the Santa Cruz Department, Bolivia

== Mountains ==
- Pukara (Antiti), a mountain near Antiti in the San Pedro de Totora Province, Oruro Department, Bolivia
- Pukara (Cochabamba), a mountain in the Cochabamba Department, Bolivia
- Pukara (Condesuyos), a mountain in the Condesuyos Province, Arequipa Region, Peru
- Pukara (Cusco), in the Cusco Region, Peru
- Pukara (Guaqui), in the Guaqui Municipality, Ingavi Province, La Paz Department, Bolivia
- Pukara (Huacanapi), a mountain near Huacanapi in the San Pedro de Totora Province, Oruro Department, Bolivia
- Pukara (Jesús de Machaca), in the Jesús de Machaca Municipality, Ingavi Province, La Paz Department, Bolivia
- Pukara (Lari), in the Lari District, Caylloma Province, Arequipa Region, Peru
- Pukara (Loayza), in the Loayza Province, La Paz Department, Bolivia
- Pukara (Marquirivi), a mountain near Marquirivi in the San Pedro de Totora Province, Oruro Department, Bolivia
- Pukara (Mejillones), in the Carangas Municipality, Mejillones Province, Oruro Department, Bolivia
- Pukara (Moquegua), in the Moquegua Region, Peru
- Pukara (Murillo), in the Murillo Province, La Paz Department, Bolivia
- Pukara (Pacajes), in the Pacajes Province, La Paz Department, Bolivia
- Pukara (Poopó), in the Poopó Province, Oruro Department, Bolivia
- Pukara (Potosí), a mountain in the Potosí Department, Bolivia
- Pukara (Sandia), a mountain in the Sandia Province, Puno Region, Peru, with an archaeological site on top
- Pukara (Tarucani), in the Tarucani District, Arequipa Province, Arequipa Region, Peru
- Pukara (Yapu Qullu), near Yapu Qullu in the Carangas Municipality, Mejillones Province, Oruro Department, Bolivia

== River ==
- Pukara Mayu, a river in Bolivia

== Others ==
- Club Pucará, and Argentine sports club
- FMA IA 58 Pucará, an Argentine counter-insurgency / attack aircraft

== See also ==
- Pukar (disambiguation)
- Pucarani, a town in the La Paz Department, Bolivia
- Pukarani (Peru), a mountain in the Puno Region, Peru
- Anti Pukara, a mountain in the Cusco Region, Peru
- Inka Pukara (disambiguation), several mountains
- Jach'a Pukara, a mountain in the Larecaja Province, La Paz Department, Bolivia
- Jach'a Pukara (Inquisivi), a mountain in the Inquisivi Province, La Paz Department, Bolivia
- Wila Pukara, a mountain in the La Paz Department, Bolivia
- Wila Pukarani, a mountain in the Oruro Department, Bolivia
