= Toledo, Oruro =

Coordinates: 18.1814°S 67.4061°W

Toledo (Oruro)
- Town
- Interactive map of Toledo (Oruro)
- Country: Bolivia
- Department: Oruro Department
- Province: Saucarí
- Municipality: Toledo
- Time zone: UTC-4 (BOT)
- Area code: (+591)

Toledo (Oruro) is a small town in Bolivia. Toledo is the administrative seat of Saucarí Province, as well as that of Toledo Municipality. The town lies at an elevation of 3,715 metres (12,188 ft) between Río Laq'a Jawira in the west and Río Vinto Jahuira in the east, both of which drain into Lake Poopó.

== Geography ==
Toledo is located in the eastern part of the Bolivian altiplano, between the Serranía de Huayllamarca to the west and the Cordillera Azanaques to the east, which in turn is part of the Bolivian Cordillera Central of the Andes mountain range. The climate is cool and semi-arid, due to the elevation. The mean average temperature of the region is around 10 °C, and the monthly average values vary only slightly from 6 °C in June/July to just under 14 °C in November/December. Annual precipitation is only 400 mm, with a distinct dry season from May to August with monthly precipitation under 10 mm, and a short wet season from December to March with 60–85 mm monthly precipitation.

== Transport network ==
Toledo is 37 kilometres (23 mi) by road southwest of Oruro, the departmental capital. Passing through Toledo is the 279 kilometres (173 mi) long Ruta 12 national road, which runs from Pisiga on the Chilean border in a northeasterly direction via Sabaya, Huachacalla, Ancaravi, and Toledo to the capital Oruro and on to Caihuasi. In Oruro it intersects with the north-south Ruta 1 trunk road from Desaguadero via El Alto, Oruro and Potosí to Bermejo. In Ocotavi it meets Ruta 4, which heads east towards Cochabamba, Santa Cruz de la Sierra and Puerto Suárez on the Brazilian border.
