= Pacha Qullu =

Mountain in Bolivia

- Kimsa Misa
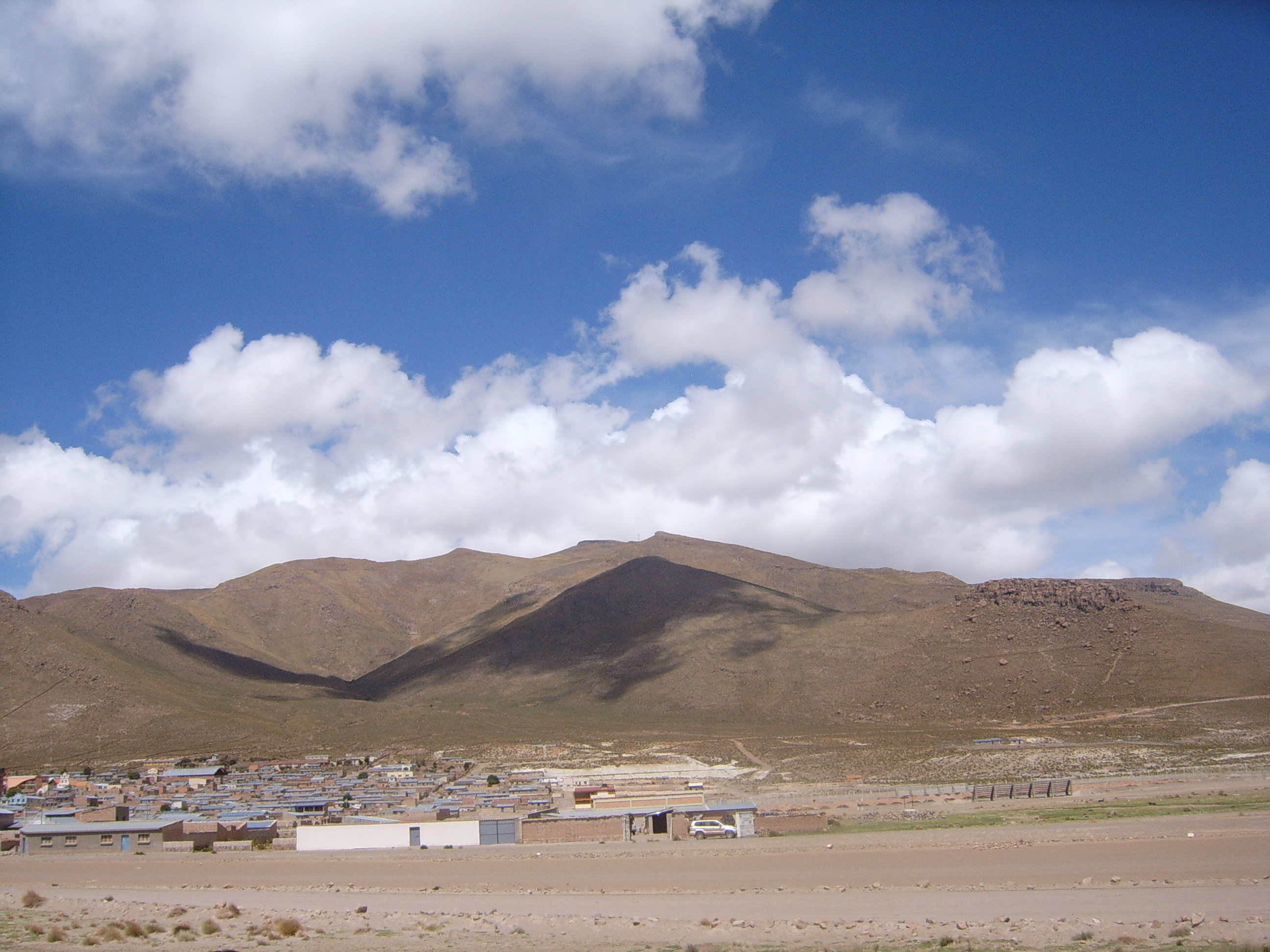
- The village of Huachacalla with the eastern slopes of Pacha Qullu in the background

Highest point
- Elevation: 4,702 m (15,427 ft)
- Coordinates: 18°47′44″S 68°18′22″W

Geography
- Location within Bolivia
- Location: Bolivia; Oruro Department
- Parent range: Andes

Pacha Qullu (Aymara pacha world; time, qullu mountain, Hispanicized spellings Pacha Kkollu, Pacha Kollu, also Pacha Kkollu Quimsa Misa) or Kimsa Misa (Aymara kimsa three, misa offering also spelled Quimsa Misa) is a 4,702-metre-high (15,427 ft) mountain in the Andes of Bolivia. It is located in the Oruro Department, Litoral Province, Huachacalla Municipality, west of Huachacalla (Wachaqalla). Pacha Qullu lies northwest of Inka Qhamachu. The plain at 18°42′44.86″S 68°34′25.21″W northwest of Pacha Qullu is named Kimsa Misa Pampa (Quimsa Misa Pampa).

The mountain is a volcano. While the date of the last eruption is not known, the degree of erosion suggests an age of about 8.3 million years. Originally the mountain was about 89 metres (292 ft) higher and had a volume of 37.4 cubic kilometres (9.0 cu mi). Pacha Qullu is a Pliocene age volcano. Its slopes range 11–16°, formed by lava flows and pyroclastic material. Erosion has carved radial gullies into its flanks, at whose ends alluvial fans have formed. The volcano has suffered a sector collapse, resulting in the formation of a 2.4 kilometres (1.5 mi) wide and 4.7-kilometre-long (2.9 mi) breach.

Temperatures in the closely located city of Oruro range 4–12 °C (39–54 °F), and precipitation is 400–100 millimetres (15.7–3.9 in). The area is very windy. This climate has led to a xerophytic vegetation, including shrubs and tussock grass.
