= Lawrani (Oruro) =

Mountain in Bolivia

- Location within Bolivia

Highest point
- Elevation: 3,990 m (13,090 ft)
- Coordinates: 17°55′26″S 67°47′28″W

Geography
- Location: Bolivia, Oruro Department
- Parent range: Andes

Lawrani (Aymara lawra a kind of fish, -ni a suffix, "the one with the lawra fish", also spelled Laurani) is a mountain in the Andes of Bolivia which reaches a height of approximately 3,990 m (13,090 ft). It is located in the Oruro Department, Nor Carangas Province (which is identical to the Huayllamarca Municipality).
