= Wila Chullpa =

Mountain in Bolivia

- Location within Bolivia

Highest point
- Elevation: 4,380 m (14,370 ft)
- Coordinates: 17°51′03″S 68°00′55″W

Geography
- Location: Bolivia, Oruro Department
- Parent range: Andes

Wila Chullpa (Aymara wila blood, blood-red, chullpa an ancient funerary building, "red chullpa") is a mountain in the Andes of Bolivia which reaches a height of approximately 4,380 m (14,370 ft). It is located in the Oruro Department, on the border of the Nor Carangas Province (which is identical to the Huayllamarca Municipality) and the San Pedro de Totora Province, northeast of the village of Huacanapi.
