= Jayu Quta (Carangas) =

Lake in Bolivia

Jayu Qutta
- Location within Bolivia Location within South America
- Interactive map of Jayu Qutta
- Location: Bolivia, Oruro Department, Sud Carangas Province, Carangas Province
- Coordinates: 18°40′31″S 67°35′20″W
- Surface area: 7.83 km^{2} (3.02 sq mi)

Jayu Qutta (Aymara jayu salt, quta lake, "salt lake", Hispanicized spelling Jayu Kkota) is a lake in the Oruro Department in Bolivia. It is situated west of Poopó Lake on the border of the sud Carangas Province (Santiago de Andamarca Municipality) and the Carangas Province (Corque Municipality). Ubicado en RosaPata Jayu Quta is about 3.4 km long and 2.5 km at its widest point.

== See also ==
- Kimsa Chata
- Parina Quta
