= Jayu Quta =

Jayu Quta (Aymara for "salt lake") may refer to:

- Jayu Quta (Carangas), a lake in the Carangas Province and Sud Carangas Province, Oruro Department, Bolivia
- Jayu Quta (Ladislao Cabrera), a lake in the Salinas de Garci Mendoza Municipality, Ladislao Cabrera Province, Oruro Department, Bolivia
