= Inka Qhamachu =

Mountain in Bolivia

Inka Qhamacha
- Location within Bolivia

Highest point
- Elevation: 4,792 m (15,722 ft)
- Coordinates: 18°51′13″S 68°12′42″W

Geography
- Location: Bolivia; Oruro Department
- Parent range: Andes

Inka Qhamacha (Quechua Inka Inca, qhamachu a species of wild tobacco (Nicotiana glauca), Hispanicized names Inca Camacho, Incacamachi) is a 4,792-metre-high (15,722 ft) mountain in the Andes of Bolivia. It is located in the Oruro Department, Litoral Province, Escara Municipality. Inka Qhamacha lies southeast of Pacha Qullu, southeast of the village of Huachacalla (Wachaqalla).

Inka Qhamacha is part of the Altiplano, an area of the Andes lying at altitudes of 3,600–4,000 metres (11,800–13,100 ft). The Altiplano has been affected by volcanic activity. Most of it including Inka Qhamacha is extinct, but in the Western Cordillera volcanic activity persists at Cerro Quemado, Guallatiri, Parinacota, Sajama and Tata Sabaya.

Inka Qhamacha is a Pliocene age volcano, which rises from an altitude of 3,700 metres (12,100 ft). Its slopes range 11–16°, formed by lava flows and pyroclastic material. Erosion has carved radial gullies into its flanks, at whose ends alluvial fans have formed. Based on the degree of erosion, an age of 7.5 million years has been estimated. The volume of the edifice once was about 50.9 cubic kilometres (12.2 cu mi).

Temperatures in the closely located city of Oruro range 4–12 °C (39–54 °F), and precipitation is 400–100 millimetres (15.7–3.9 in). The area is very windy. This climate has led to a xerophytic vegetation, including shrubs and tussock grass.
