= Iru Willk'i =

Mountain in Bolivia

- Location within Bolivia

Highest point
- Elevation: 4,063 m (13,330 ft)
- Coordinates: 17°57′20″S 68°12′11″W

Geography
- Location: Bolivia, Oruro Department
- Parent range: Andes

Iru Willk'i (Aymara iru spiny Peruvian feather grass, willk'i gap, "Peruvian feather grass gap", also spelled Iru Willkhi) is a 4,063-metre-high (13,330 ft) mountain in the Andes of Bolivia. It is located in the Oruro Department, San Pedro de Totora Province. It lies at the Q'ara Quta River.
