= Japu Willk'i =

Mountain in Bolivia

- Location within Bolivia

Highest point
- Elevation: 4,200 m (13,800 ft)
- Coordinates: 17°53′54″S 68°15′45″W

Geography
- Location: Bolivia, Oruro Department
- Parent range: Andes

Japu Willk'i (Aymara japu ember; floury, willk'i gap, "ember gap" or "floury gap", also spelled Japu Willkhi) is a mountain in the Andes of Bolivia which reaches a height of approximately 4,200 m (13,800 ft). It is located in the Oruro Department, San Pedro de Totora Province. Japu Willk'i lies at the Sulluma River, southeast of Ch'alla Willk'i.
