= Tanka Tanka =

Tanka Tanka can mean:

- Tanka Tanka (La Paz), a mountain in La Paz Department, Bolivia
- Tanka Tanka (Oruro), a mountain in Oruro Department, Bolivia
- Tanqa Tanqa, an archaeological site in Peru
