= Andamarca =

Andamarca may refer to:

- Andamarca (Oruro), a town and municipality in Bolivia
- Andamarca, Lucanas Province, capital of Carmen Salcedo District, Lucanas Province, Ayacucho Region, Peru
- Andamarca District, Concepción Province, Junín Region, Peru
