= Kimsa Chata =

Kimsa Chata or Kimsachata (Aymara and Pukina for "three mountains") may refer to:

- Kimsa Chata (Arequipa), a mountain in Peru, Arequipa Region
- Kimsa Chata (Bolivia-Chile), a group of three mountains on the border of Bolivia and Chile
- Kimsachata (Canchis), a mountain in Peru, Cusco Region, Canchis Province
- Kimsa Chata (Carangas), a mountain in Bolivia, Oruro Department, Carangas Province
- Kimsa Chata (Chile), a mountain in Chile
- Kimsa Chata (Ingavi), a mountain in Bolivia, La Paz Department, Ingavi Province
- Kimsa Chata (Los Andes), a mountain in Bolivia, La Paz Department, Los Andes Province
- Kimsachata (Quispicanchi), a mountain in Peru, Cusco Region, Quispicanchi Province
- Kimsa Chata (Sabaya), a mountain in Bolivia, Oruro Department, Sabaya Province
- Kimsa Chata (Sajama), a group of three mountains in Bolivia, Oruro Department, Sajama Province
