= Pukarani =

Pukarani (Aymara pukara fortress, -ni a suffix, "the one with a fortress", also spelled Pocarani, Pucarani) may refer to:

- Pucarani, a town in the La Paz Department, Bolivia
- Pukarani (Bolivia), a mountain in the Oruro Department, Bolivia
- Pukarani (Cochabamba), a mountain in the Cochabamba Department, Bolivia
- Pukarani (La Paz), a mountain in the La Paz Department, Bolivia
- Pukarani (Peru), a mountain with an archaeological site of that name in the Puno Region, Peru
- Pukarani (Potosí), a mountain in the Potosí Department, Bolivia

== See also ==
- Pukara (disambiguation)
