= Tanka Tanka (Oruro) =

Mountain in Bolivia

- Location within Bolivia

Highest point
- Elevation: 4,014 m (13,169 ft)
- Coordinates: 17°53′48″S 68°13′40″W

Geography
- Location: Bolivia, Oruro Department
- Parent range: Andes

Tanka Tanka (Aymara tanka hat or biretta, the reduplication indicates that there is a group of something, "many hats (or birettas)", also spelled Tankha Tankha) is a 4,014-metre-high (13,169 ft) mountain in the Andes of Bolivia. It is located in the Oruro Department, San Pedro de Totora Province. Tanka Tanka lies at the Sulluma River, southeast of Lluqu Lluqu.
