= Nina Qullu =

Mountain in Bolivia

- Location within Bolivia

Highest point
- Elevation: 4,540 m (14,900 ft)
- Coordinates: 18°00′23″S 67°47′53″W

Geography
- Location: Bolivia, Oruro Department
- Parent range: Andes

Nina Qullu (Aymara nina fire, qullu mountain, "fire mountain", also spelled Nina Kkollu) is a mountain in the Andes of Bolivia which reaches a height of approximately 4,540 m (14,900 ft). It is located in the Oruro Department, Nor Carangas Province (which is identical to the Huayllamarca Municipality).
