= Inka Murata =

Archaeological site in Bolivia

- Location: Bolivia, Oruro Department, Litoral Province, Escara Municipality
- Region: Altiplano

Inka Murata is an archaeological site in the Altiplano of Bolivia. It is located in the Oruro Department, Litoral Province, Escara Municipality, in the community of Escara. The site with the adjacent burial towers (chullpa) was declared a National Historical Monument by Law 3833 on January 23, 2008.
