= Parina Quta (Oruro) =

- Location within Bolivia Location within South America
- Interactive map of Parina Quta
- Location: Bolivia, Oruro Department, Carangas Province
- Coordinates: 18°40′31″S 67°35′20″W
- Surface elevation: 3,753 m (12,313 ft)

Parina Quta (Aymara parina flamingo, quta lake, "flamingo lake", hispanicized spellings Parinacota, Parina Kkota) is a lake in Bolivia in the Oruro Department, Carangas Province, Corque Municipality. It is situated west of Poopó Lake, about 3,753 m (12,313 ft) high. Parina Quta is about 1.9 km long and 0.5 km at its widest point.

== See also ==
- Jayu Quta
- Kimsa Chata
