= Ch'iyar Qullu (Oruro) =

Volcano in Bolivia

- Location within Bolivia

Highest point
- Coordinates: 19°26′00″S 67°23′00″W

Geography
- Location: Bolivia, Oruro Department, Ladislao Cabrera Province
- Parent range: Andes

Ch'iyar Qullu (Aymara ch'iyara black, qullu mountain, "black mountain", also spelled Chiar Kkollu) is a volcanic centre in Bolivia. It is located in the Oruro Department, Ladislao Cabrera Province, Salinas de Garci Mendoza Municipality, northeast of Salinas de Garci Mendoza, near a maar named Jayu Quta ("salt lake").

It is a sill formed from primitive phyric alkali basalt that closely resembles ocean island basalt in composition and now appears as a hill. The rocks contain augite and olivine and the eruption site coincides with a local lineament and is of Miocene age, with dates of 22.51±0.45 mya by Ar-Ar dating and 25.2±0.5 mya by K-Ar dating. The Ch'iyar Qullu magmas are Central Andes intraplate magmas and originate from the upper mantle.
