= Ch'alla Willk'i =

Ch'alla Willk'i (Aymara ch'alla sand, willk'i gap, "sand gap", also spelled Challa Willkhi, Challahuillque, Challahuillqui) may refer to:

- Ch'alla Willk'i (La Paz), a mountain in the La Paz Department, Bolivia
- Ch'alla Willk'i (Oruro), a mountain in the Sajama Province, Oruro Department, Bolivia
- Ch'alla Willk'i (Totora), a mountain in the San Pedro de Totora Province, Oruro Department, Bolivia
