= Parinacota =

Parinacota (in Hispanicized spelling), Parina Quta or Parinaquta (Aymara, parina flamingo, quta lake, "flamingo lake", other Hispanicized spellings Parinaccota, Parinajota) may refer to:

== Lakes ==
- Parinaquta (Carabaya), in Peru, Puno Region, Carabaya Province
- Parinaquta (Chucuito), in Peru, Puno Region, Chucuito Province
- Parina Quta (Oruro), in Bolivia, Oruro Department
- Parina Quta (Bolivia-Peru), in Bolivia, La Paz Department and in Peru, Puno Region, El Collao Province

== Volcanoes ==
- Parinacota Volcano

== Places ==
- Parinacota Province
- Parinacota, Chile
- Arica-Parinacota Region
