= Carangas Province =

Carangas
- Province
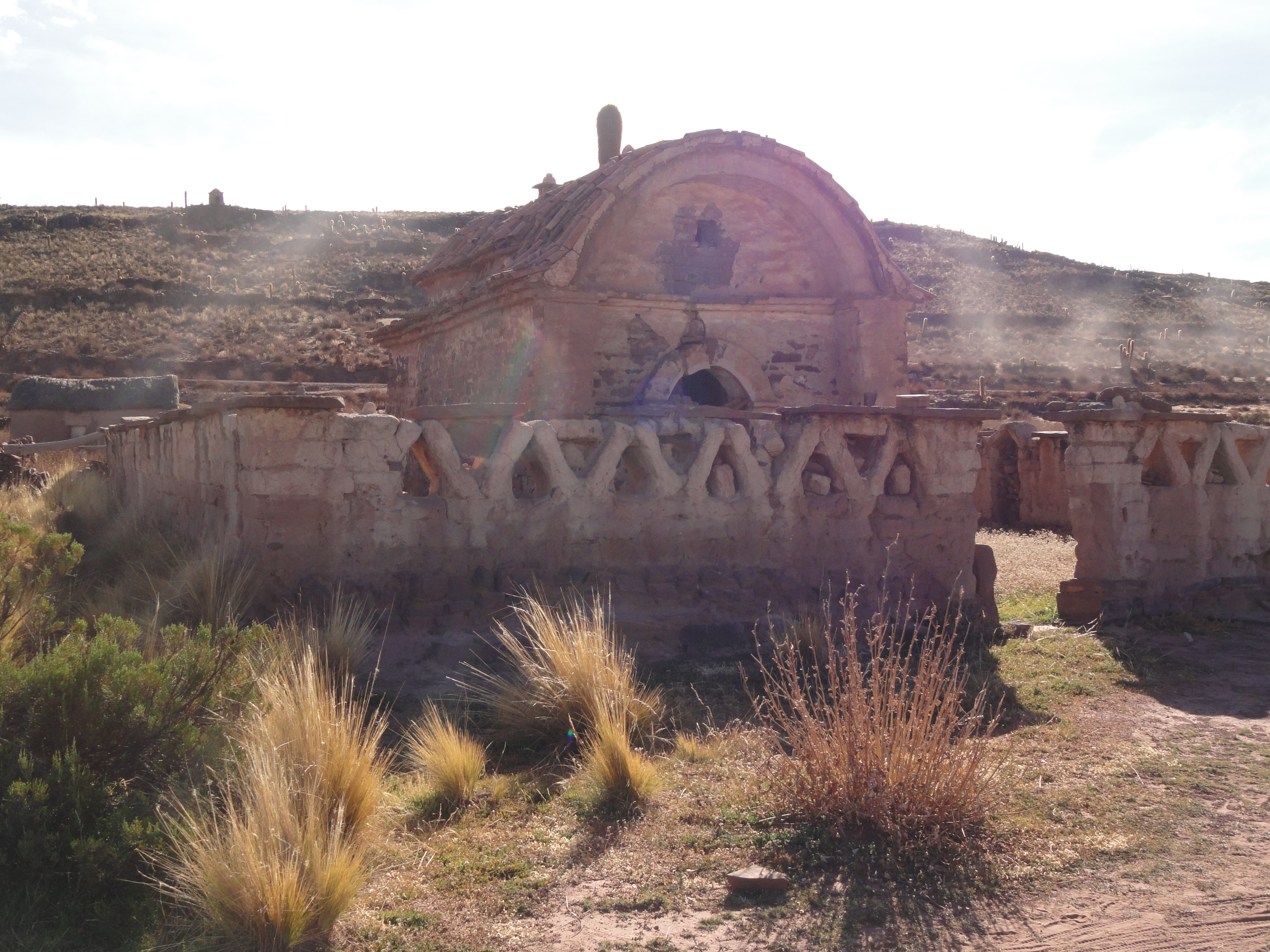
- The church of Janq'u Qala, Carangas Province

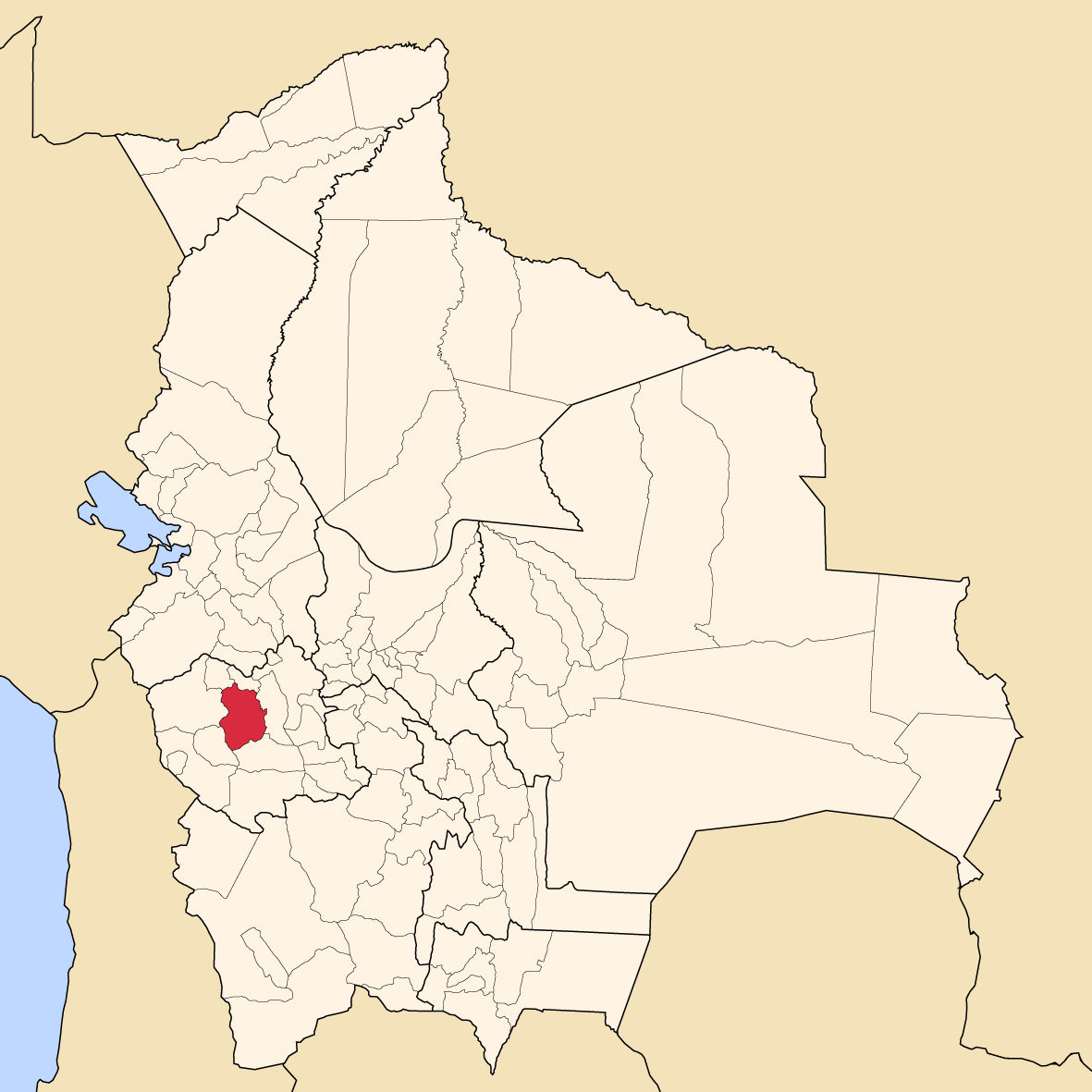
- Location of Carangas Province in Bolivia
- Coordinates: 18°27′S 67°27′W
- Country: Bolivia
- Department: Oruro
- Capital: Corque

Area
  - Total: 4,309 km^{2} (1,664 sq mi)

Population (2024 census)
  - Total: 19,000
  - Density: 4.4/km^{2} (11/sq mi)
  - Ethnicities: Aymara

Languages spoken (2021)
  - Aymara: 94%
  - Spanish: 84%
  - Quechua: 13%

Sectors
- Time zone: UTC-4 (BOT)

Carangas is a province in the northern parts of the Bolivian department of Oruro.

== Location ==
Carangas province is one of sixteen provinces in the Oruro Department. It is located between 17° 59' and 18° 54' South and between 67° 09' and 67° 45' West.

It borders San Pedro de Totora Province in the northwest, Sajama Province in the west, Litoral Province in the southwest, Sud Carangas Province in the southeast, Saucarí Province in the east, and Nor Carangas Province in the northeast.

The province extends over 105 km from North to South, and 75 km from east to west.

== Demographics ==
The main language of the province is Aymara, spoken by 94%, while 84% of the population speak Spanish and 13% Quechua.

The population increased from 7,930 inhabitants (1992 census) to 10,505 (2001 census), an increase of 32.5%. - 43.1% of the population is younger than 15 years old.

92.5% of the population have no access to electricity, 98.1% have no sanitary facilities.

79.8% of the population are employed in agriculture, 0.1% in mining, 3.5% in industry, 16.6% in general services (2001).

72% of the population are Catholics, 23% are Protestants (1992).

== Division ==
The province comprises two municipalities which are further subdivided into cantons.

Section	Municipality	Seat
1st	Corque Municipality	Corque
2nd	Choquecota Municipality	Choquecota

== See also ==
- Jach'a Jawira
- Jayu Quta
- Kimsa Chata
- Parina Quta
- Qullpa Jawira
