= Lluqu Lluqu (Oruro) =

Mountain in Bolivia

- Location within Bolivia

Highest point
- Elevation: 4,040 m (13,250 ft)
- Coordinates: 17°52′44″S 68°14′55″W

Geography
- Location: Bolivia, Oruro Department
- Parent range: Andes

Lluqu Lluqu (Aymara for heart, also spelled Llokho Llokho) is a mountain in the Andes of Bolivia which reaches a height of approximately 4,040 m (13,250 ft). It is located in the Oruro Department, San Pedro de Totora Province. Lluqu Lluqu lies northeast of Japu Willk'i.
