= Pukaar =

Pukaar may refer to one of the following television series:

- Pukaar (Indian TV series), a 2014 Indian TV series on Like Ok
- Pukaar (Pakistan TV series), a 2018 Pakistan TV series

== See also ==
- Pukar (disambiguation)
- Pukara (disambiguation)
