= Qullpa Jawira =

Qullpa Jawira (Aymara qullpa salpeter, jawira river, "salpeter river", also spelled Collpa Jahuira, Kollpa Jahuira, Kollpajahuira, Collpajahuira) may refer to:

- Qullpa Jawira (La Paz), a river in the La Paz Department, Bolivia
- Qullpa Jawira (Carangas-Litoral), a river in the provinces of Carangas and Litoral, Oruro Department, Bolivia
- Qullpa Jawira (Sebastián Pagador), a river in the Sebastián Pagador Province, Oruro Department, Bolivia
