= Jach'a Jawira (Oruro) =

- Etymology: Aymara

Location
- Country: Bolivia
- Region: Oruro Department

Physical characteristics
- Mouth
  - location: Choquecota Municipality, Carangas Province
  - coordinates: 18°7′S 67°55′W

Jach'a Jawira (Aymara jach'a big, great, jawira river, "great river", hispanicized spelling Jachcha Jahuira) is a Bolivian river north of Coipasa Lake in the Oruro Department. Coming from the Waylla Marka range northwest of Poopó Lake the river flows in a south-western direction along the village of Belén de Choquecota in the Nor Carangas Province towards the Carangas Province. In the Choquecota Municipality, southwest of Choquecota, it empties into the Barras River which ends in Coipasa Lake.
