= Kimsa Qullu =

Mountain in Bolivia

- Location within Bolivia

Highest point
- Elevation: 4,624 m (15,171 ft)
- Coordinates: 18°01′18″S 67°46′58″W

Geography
- Location: Bolivia, Oruro Department
- Parent range: Andes

Kimsa Qullu (Aymara kimsa three, qullu mountain, "three mountains", also spelled Quimsa Kkollu) is a 4,624-metre-high (15,171 ft) mountain in the Andes of Bolivia. It is located in the Oruro Department, Nor Carangas Province (which is identical to the Huayllamarca Municipality).
