= Kiwuri (Totora) =

Mountain in Bolivia

- Location within Bolivia

Highest point
- Elevation: 4,302 m (14,114 ft)
- Coordinates: 17°46′29″S 68°03′02″W

Geography
- Location: Bolivia, Oruro Department
- Parent range: Andes

Kiwuri (Aymara kiwu canine tooth or tusk, -ri a suffix, also spelled Kiburi, Quiburi) is a 4,302-metre-high (14,114 ft) mountain in the Andes of Bolivia. It is located in the Oruro Department, San Pedro de Totora Province.
