= Pukar =

Pukar means a "cry for help or attention" or "to call out" in Hindi and Urdu and may refer to:

- Pukar (1939 film), a Hindi film by Sohrab Modi
- Pukar (1983 film), a Hindi film by Ramesh Behl
- Pukar (1984 film), a Pakistan film by Aizaz Syed and starring Sultan Rahi
- Pukar (2000 film), a Hindi film by Rajkumar Santoshi

== See also ==
- Pukaar (disambiguation)
- Pukara (disambiguation)
