= Sallani Yapu =

Mountain in Bolivia

- Location within Bolivia

Highest point
- Elevation: 4,224 m (13,858 ft)
- Coordinates: 19°36′36″S 67°22′13″W

Geography
- Location: Bolivia, Oruro Department
- Parent range: Andes

Sallani Yapu (Aymara salla rocks, cliffs, -ni a suffix, yapu field, "field with rocks") is a 4,224-metre-high (13,858 ft) mountain in the Andes of Bolivia. It is located in the Oruro Department, Ladislao Cabrera Province, Salinas de Garci Mendoza Municipality. It lies north of the Uyuni salt flat.
