= Litoral (Bolivia) =

- Province
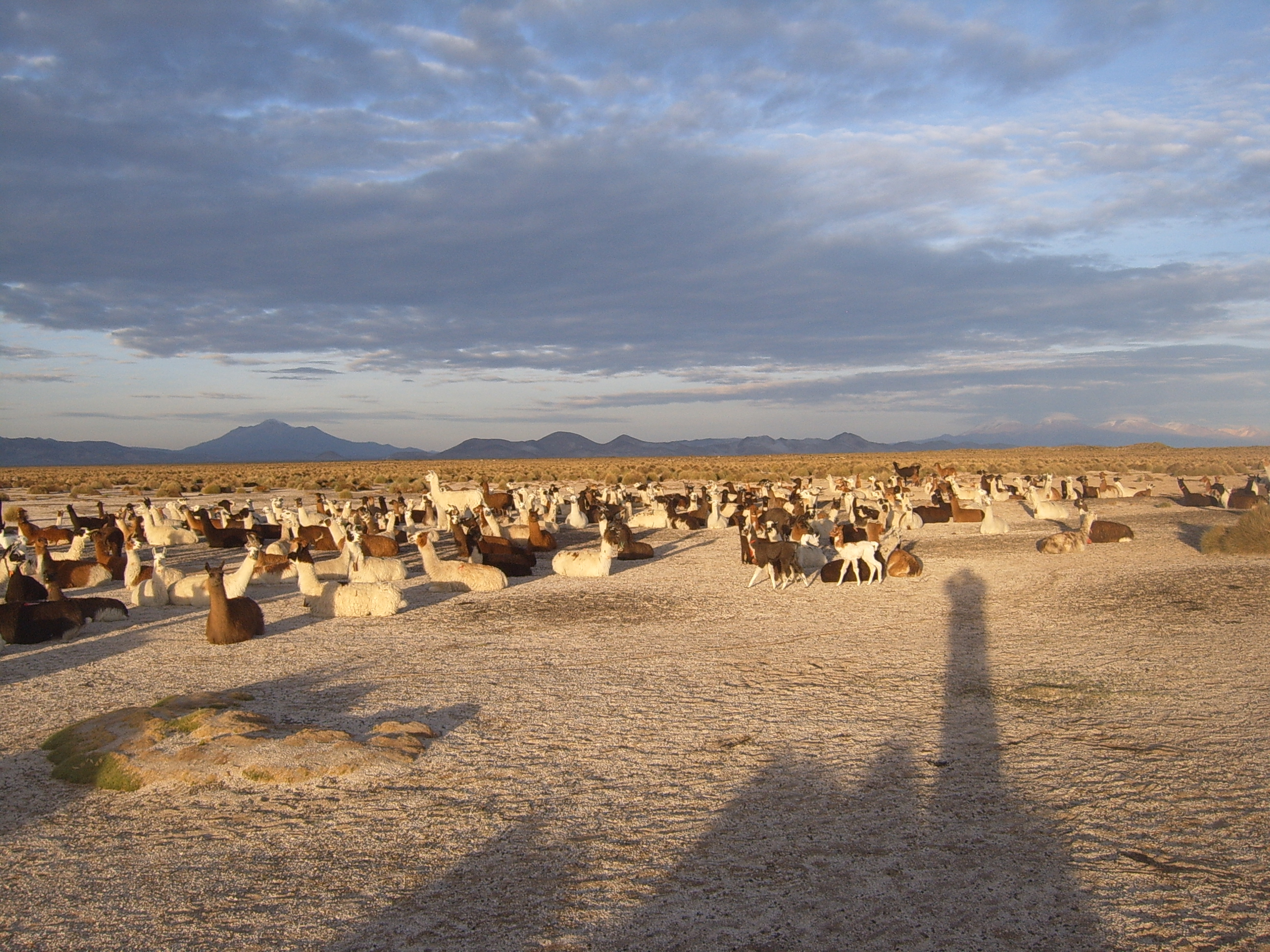
- Dawn in Sikiri, Litoral Province

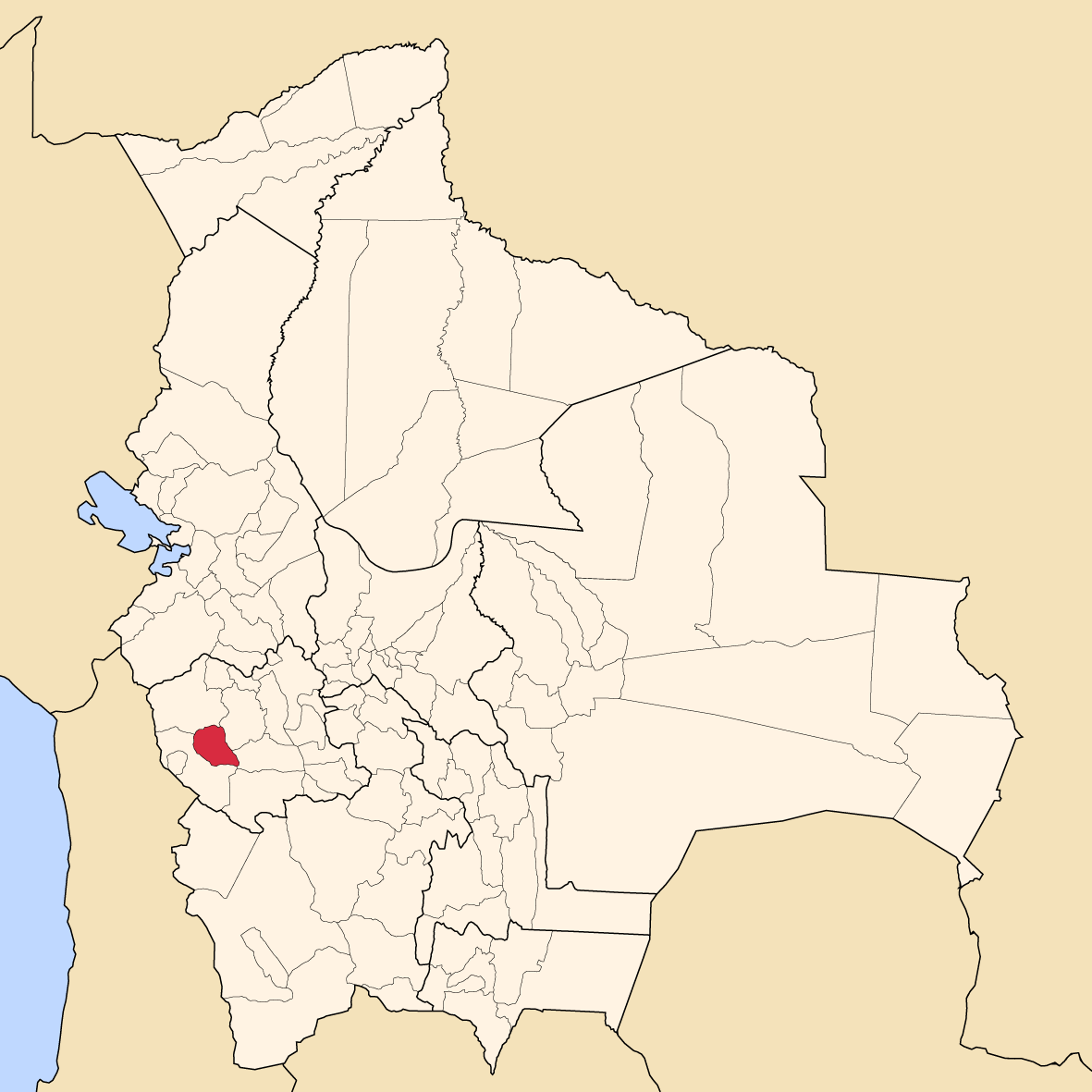
- Location of Litoral Province in Bolivia
- Coordinates: 18°48′S 67°47′W
- Country: Bolivia
- Department: Oruro
- Capital: Huachacalla

Area
  - Total: 2,379 km^{2} (919 sq mi)

Population (2024 census)
  - Total: 14,444
  - Density: 6.071/km^{2} (15.73/sq mi)
  - Ethnicities: Aymara

Languages spoken(2001)
  - Spanish: 89.8%
  - Aymara: 76.0%
  - Quechua: 13.7%

Sectors
- Time zone: UTC-4 (BOT)

Litoral (or Litoral de Atacama) is a province in the southwestern parts of the Bolivian Oruro Department. Its seat is Huachacalla.

== Location ==
Litoral Province is one of sixteen provinces in the Oruro Department. It is located between 18° 32' and 19° 04' South and between 67° 29' and 68° 06' West.

The province borders Sajama Province in the north, Sabaya Province in the west and south, Sud Carangas Province in the southeast, and Carangas Province in the northeast.

The province extends over 65 km from north to south, and 55 km from east to west.

== Population ==
The main language of the province is Spanish, spoken by 89.8%, while 76.0% of the population speak Aymara and 13.7% Quechua.

The population increased from 2,087 inhabitants (1992 census) to 4,555 (2001 census), an increase of more than 100%. - 34.5% of the population are younger than 15 years old.

94.5% of the population have no access to electricity, 90.5% have no sanitary facilities.

78.0% of the population are employed in agriculture, 3.1% in industry, 18.9% in general services (2001).

77.6% of the population are Catholics, 16.3% are Protestants (1992).

== Division ==
The province comprises five municipalities which are further subdivided into cantons.

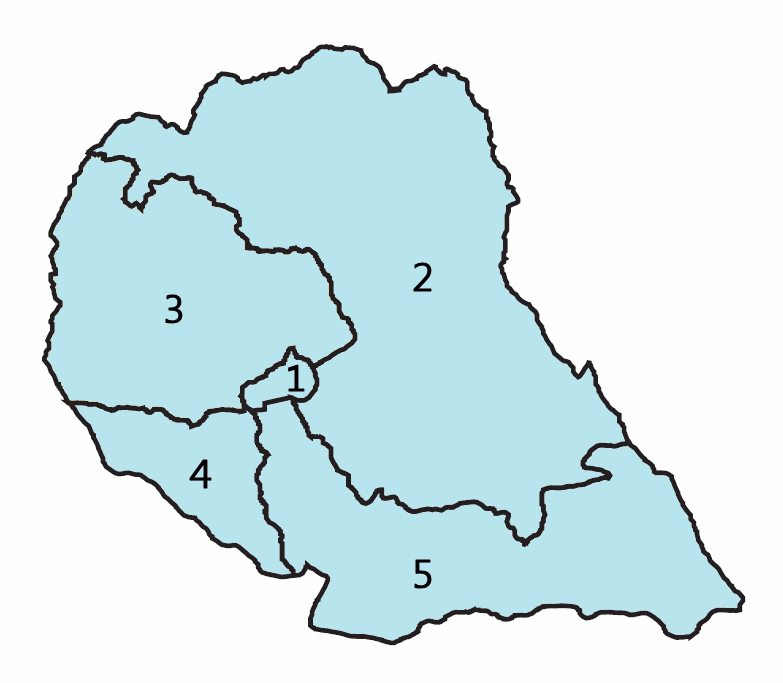
Municipalities of Litoral Province

Section	Municipality	Seat
1st	Huachacalla Municipality	Huachacalla
2nd	Escara Municipality	Escara
3rd	Cruz de Machacamarca Municipality	Cruz de Machacamarca
4th	Yunguyo del Litoral Municipality	Yunguyo del Litoral
5th	Esmeralda Municipality	Esmeralda

== See also ==
- Inka Murata
- Inka Qhamachu
- Pacha Qullu
- Qullpa Jawira
