= San Pedro de Totora Province =

San Pedro de Totora
- Province
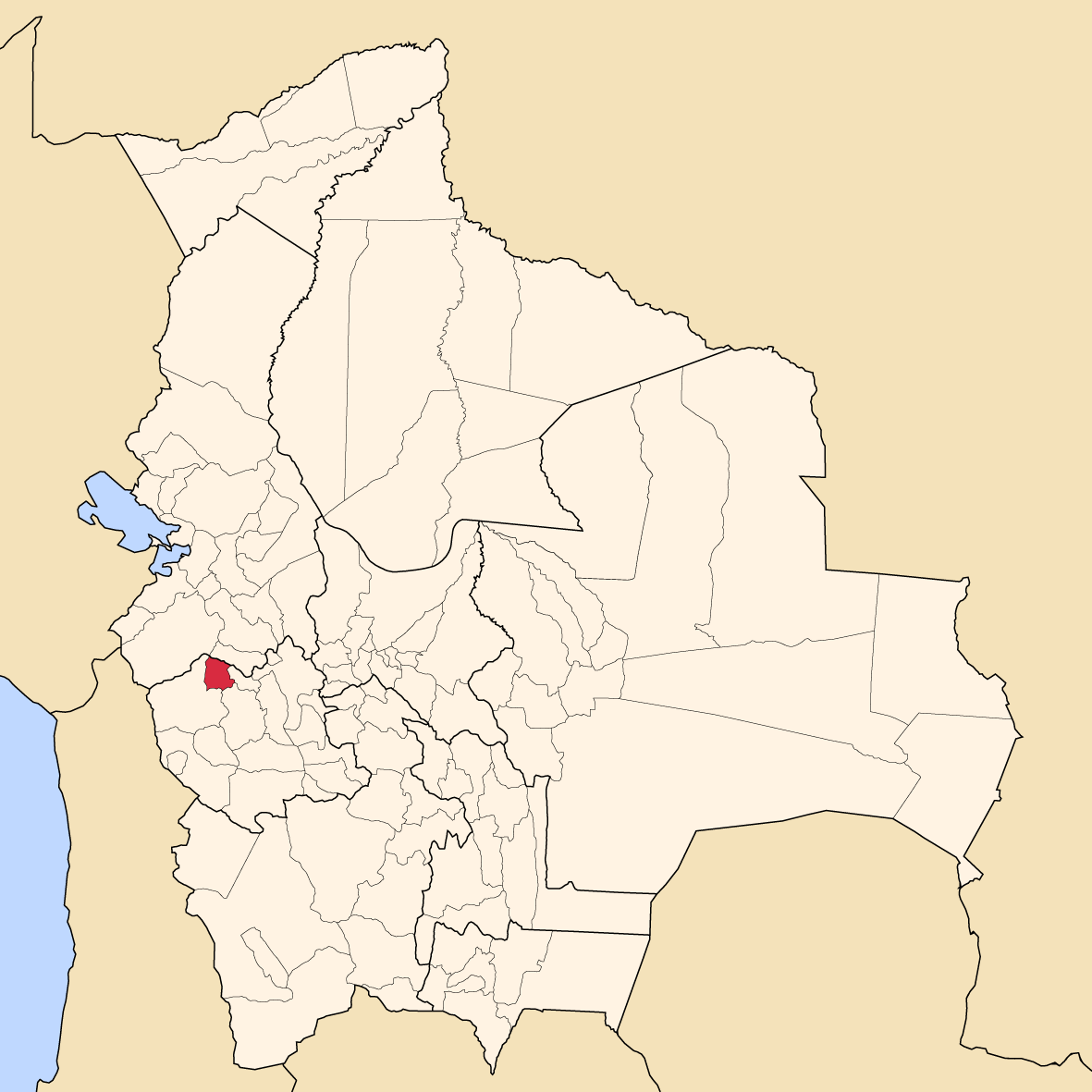
- Location of Litoral Province in Bolivia
- Coordinates: 17°54′S 67°45′W
- Country: Bolivia
- Department: Oruro
- Capital: Totora

Area
  - Total: 1,412 km^{2} (545 sq mi)

Population (2024 census)
  - Total: 6,570
  - Density: 4.65/km^{2} (12.1/sq mi)
  - Ethnicities: Aymara

Languages spoken
  - Aymara: 90%
  - Spanish: 72.5%
  - Quechua: 3%

Sectors
- Time zone: UTC-4 (BOT)

San Pedro de Totora is a province in the northern parts of the Bolivian department of Oruro.

== Location ==
San Pedro de Totora province is one of the sixteen provinces in the Oruro Department. It is located between 17° 41' and 18° 06' South and between 67° 33' and 67° 58' West.

The province borders La Paz Department in the north, Sajama Province in the west and southwest, Carangas Province in the southeast, and Nor Carangas Province in the east.

The province extends over 50 km from north to south, and 45 km from east to west.

== Geography ==
Some of the highest mountains of the province are listed below:

- Ch'alla Willk'i
- Iru Willk'i
- Jach'a Ch'utu
- Janq'u Jaqhi
- Japu Willk'i
- Kiwuri
- Lluqu Lluqu
- Mañasu
- Pukara (near Antiti)
- Pukara (near Huacanapi)
- Pukara (near Marquirivi)
- Tanka Tanka
- T'iwu
- Wila Chullpa
- Willka Kunka
- Wiluyu
- Yapu Qullu

== Population ==
Main idiom of the province is Aymara, spoken by 90%, while 72.5% of the population speak Spanish and 3% Quechua (1992).

The population increased from 4,040 inhabitants (1992 census) to 4,941 (2001 census), an increase of 22.3%. - 43% of the population are younger than 15 years old (1992).

99% of the population have no access to electricity, 94% have no sanitary facilities (1992).

83.5% of the population are employed in agriculture, 4% in industry, 12.5% in general services (2001).

64% of the population are Catholics, 25% are Protestants (1992).

== Division ==
The province comprises only one municipality, Totora Municipality. It is identical to San Pedro de Totora Province.
