= Pukara (Huacanapi) =

Mountain in Bolivia

- Location within Bolivia

Highest point
- Elevation: 4,140 m (13,580 ft)
- Coordinates: 17°51′52″S 68°06′25″W

Geography
- Location: Bolivia, Oruro Department
- Parent range: Andes

Pukara (Aymara for fortress, also spelled Pucara) is a mountain in the Andes of Bolivia which reaches a height of approximately 4,140 m (13,580 ft). It is located in the Oruro Department, San Pedro de Totora Province, west of the village of Huacanapi.
