= Yapu Qullu (Totora) =

Mountain in Bolivia

- Location within Bolivia

Highest point
- Elevation: 4,206 m (13,799 ft)
- Coordinates: 17°52′54″S 68°05′20″W

Geography
- Location: Bolivia, Oruro Department
- Parent range: Andes

Yapu Qullu (Aymara yapu field, qullu mountain, "field mountain", also spelled Yapu Kkollu) is a 4,206-metre-high (13,799 ft) mountain in the Andes of Bolivia. It is located in the Oruro Department, San Pedro de Totora Province, southwest of the village of Huacanapi.
