= Ladislao Cabrera Province =

Ladislao Cabrera
- Province
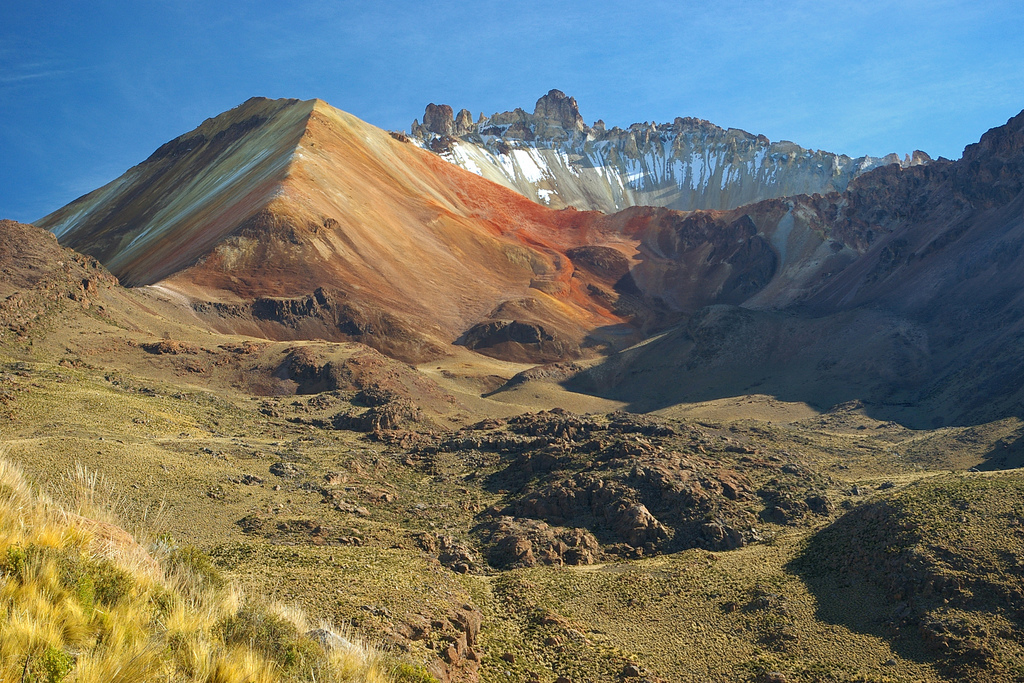
- The dormant Tunupa volcano, Ladislao Cabrera Province

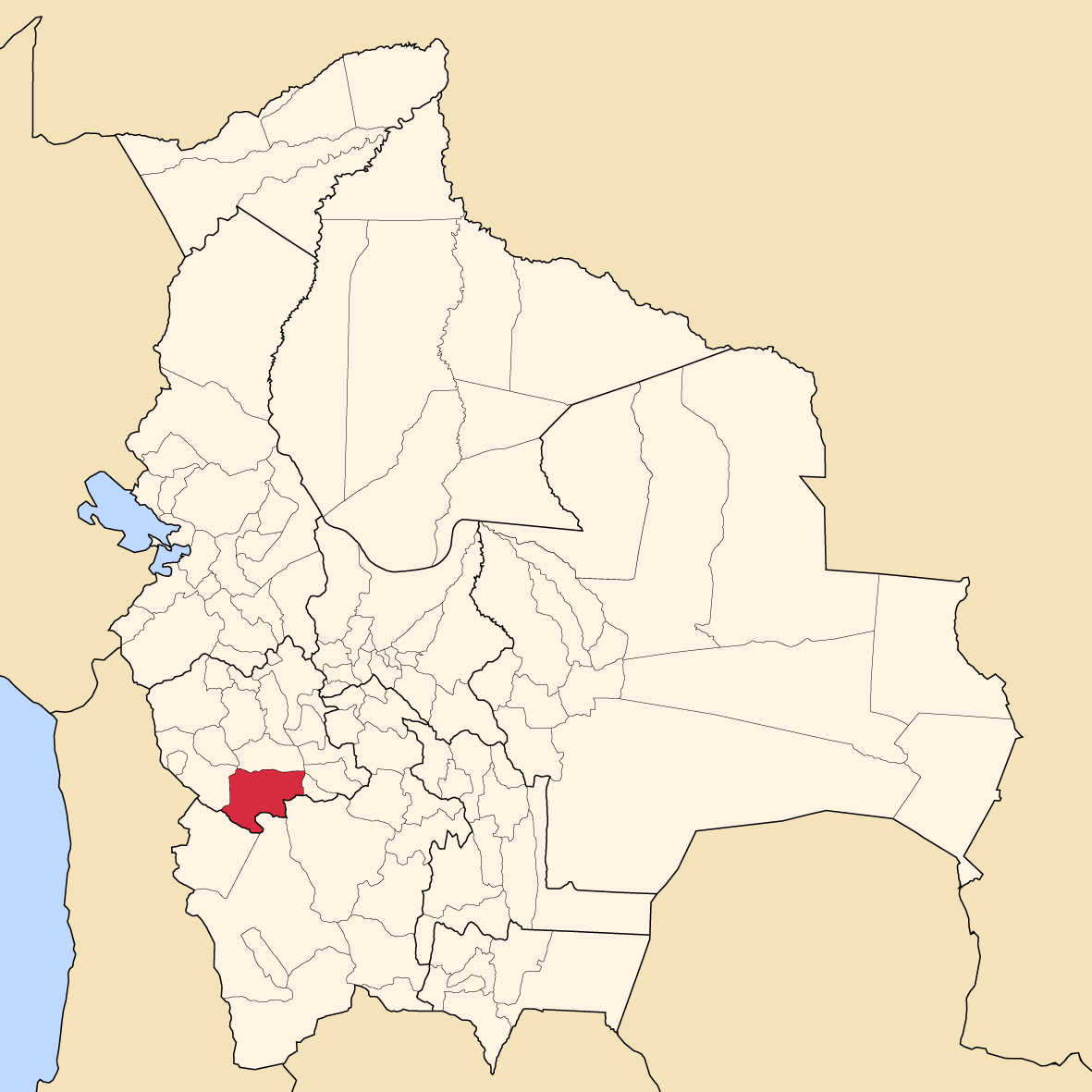
- Location of Ladislao Cabrera Province in Bolivia
- Coordinates: 19°30′S 67°09′W
- Country: Bolivia
- Department: Oruro
- Capital: Salinas de Garci Mendoza

Area
  - Total: 6,554 km^{2} (2,531 sq mi)

Population (2024 census)
  - Total: 19,086
  - Density: 2.912/km^{2} (7.542/sq mi)
  - Ethnicities: Quechua

Languages spoken (2001)
  - Aymara: 90.5%
  - Spanish: 86.4%
  - Quechua: 19.7%

Sectors
- Time zone: UTC-4 (BOT)

Ladislao Cabrera is a province in the southern parts of the Bolivian department of Oruro. It is named after Ladislao Cabrera (1830 – 1921). Its seat is Salinas de Garci Mendoza.

== Location ==
Ladislao Cabrera is one of sixteen provinces in the Oruro Department. It is located between 19° 02' and 19° 56' South and between 66° 35' and 67° 43' West.

The province borders Sud Carangas Province in the north, Atahuallpa Province in the west, Potosí Department in the south, Eduardo Avaroa Province in the east, and Sebastián Pagador Province in the northeast.

The province extends over 100 km from north to south, and 125 km from east to west.

== Demographics ==
The main language of the province is Aymara, spoken by 90.5% of inhabitants, while 86.4% of the population speak Spanish and 19.7% speak Quechua.

The population increased from 7,363 inhabitants (1992 census) to 11,698 (2001 census), an increase of 59%. 42.5% of the population are younger than 15 years old.

99.9% of the population have no access to electricity and 90.0% have no sanitary facilities.

82.4% of the population are employed in agriculture, 0.1% in mining, 1.8% in industry, and 15.7% in general services (2001).

85.4% of the population are Catholics, 10.2% are Protestants (1992).

== Division ==
The province comprises two municipalities, which are further subdivided into cantons.

| Section | Municipality | Seat |
|---|---|---|
| 1st | Salinas de Garci Mendoza Municipality | Salinas de Garci Mendoza |
| 2nd | Pampa Aullagas Municipality | Pampa Aullagas |

== See also ==
- Ch'iyar Qullu
- Jayu Quta
- Jilarata
- Sallani Yapu
- Tunupa
