= Jilarata =

Mountain in Bolivia

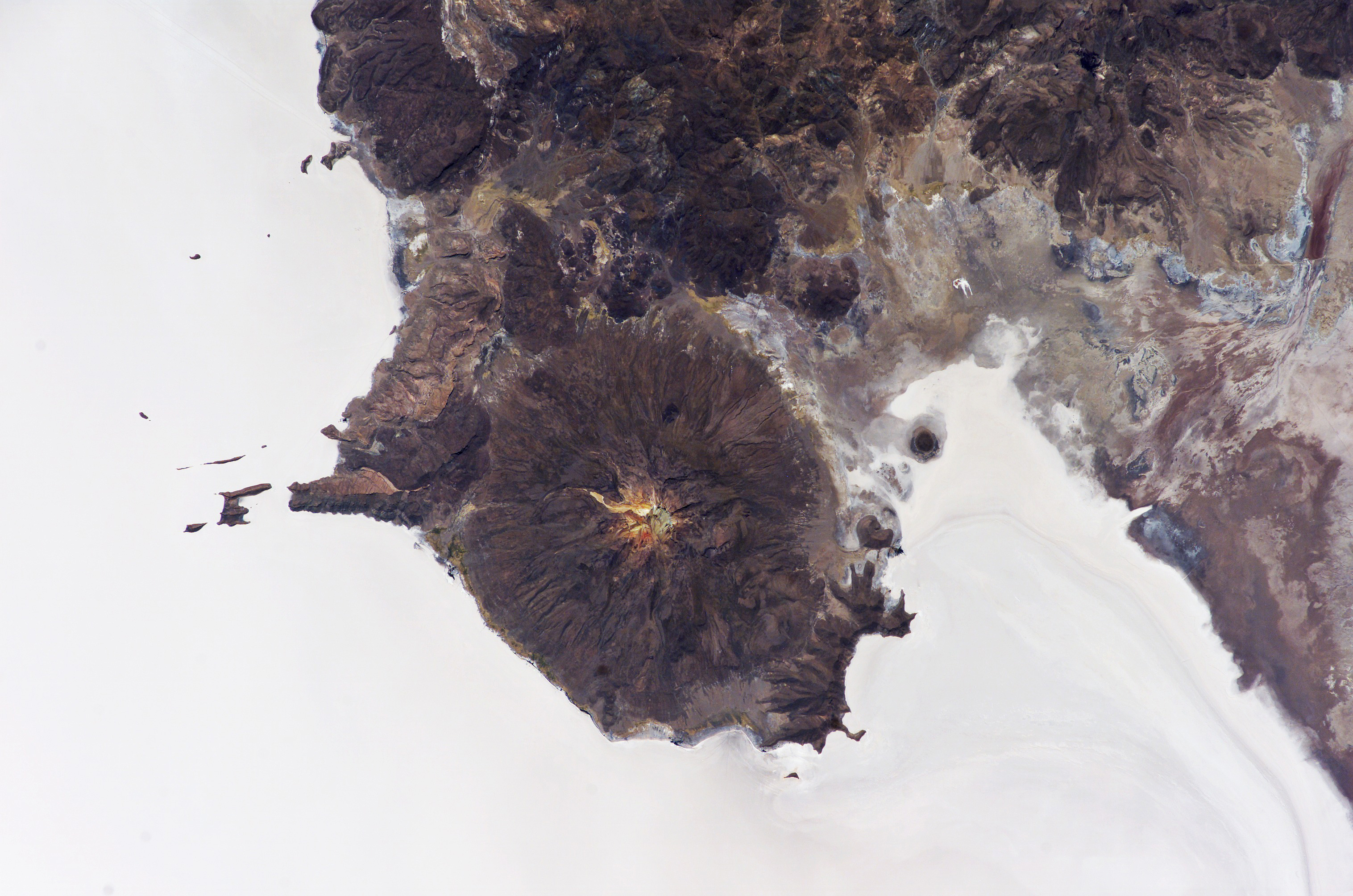
- Tunupa, a dormant volcano (center), Jilarata (upper right) and part of the Uyuni salt flat as seen from above (NASA)

Highest point
- Elevation: 4,594 m (15,072 ft)
- Coordinates: 19°35′28″S 67°38′40″W

Geography
- Location within Bolivia
- Location: Bolivia, Oruro Department
- Parent range: Andes

Jilarata is a 4,594-metre-high (15,072 ft) mountain in the Andes of Bolivia. It is located in the Oruro Department, Ladislao Cabrera Province, Salinas de Garci Mendoza Municipality. It lies near the Uyuni salt flat, north of Tunupa.
