= Qullpa Jawira (Carangas-Litoral) =

- Etymology: Aymara

Location
- Country: Bolivia
- Region: Oruro Department, Carangas Province, Litoral Province

Qullpa Jawira (Aymara qullpa saltpeter, jawira river, "saltpeter river", hispanicized spelling Kollpa Jahuira) is a Bolivian river west of Poopó Lake and north of Coipasa Lake in the Oruro Department. It flows through the Escara Municipality in the Litoral Province and the Corque Municipality in the Carangas Province.

== See also ==
- List of rivers of Bolivia
