= Pukara (Marquirivi) =

Mountain in Bolivia

- Location within Bolivia

Highest point
- Elevation: 4,019 m (13,186 ft)
- Coordinates: 17°57′30″S 68°00′50″W

Geography
- Location: Bolivia, Oruro Department
- Parent range: Andes

Pukara (Aymara for fortress, also spelled Pucara) is a 4,019-metre-high (13,186 ft) mountain in the Andes of Bolivia. It is located in the Oruro Department, San Pedro de Totora Province, west of the village of Marquirivi.
