= Oruro–Potosí boundary conflicts =

There are several boundary conflicts between the departments of Oruro and Potosí in Bolivia, resulting from inaccurate mapping and conflicts between neighboring communities across the interdepartmental boundary.

== History ==
The history of boundary conflicts between Oruro and Potosí dates back as far as the early colonial period. When the Spanish arrived in the Americas, they never took into account the territorial spaces of the various indigenous and native peoples who already lived in the area, such as the ayllus, markas, and suyus of Quechua and Aymara speaker in the region. The Spanish imposed their own logic of territorial organization brought from Spain, which was unrelated to the forms of land management practiced by those peoples.

At the beginning of the Republican period (1825) a new process of territorial organization began around the departments of Bolivia, once again dividing the population into town and localities that were unknown to them. During this period, and through the creation of the various departments and provinces, these conflicts reactivated with greater intensity.

== Conflict over the name of the Salar ==
According to the Oruro perspective, the salt flats currently known internationally as the Salar de Uyuni was once called the "Salar de Thunupa" at least from the colonial era. For Uyuni as such was only founded in 1889 during the government of Aniceto Arce Ruiz. Orureños accuse the Potosino city of having attributed its name to the Salar without any authorization.

== Chullpa–Tayaquira conflict ==
At least one person was killed during an April 2002 conflict between the Chullpa and Tayaquira ayllus.

== Boundary conflict involving Uyuni municipality ==
Fundación Unir reports that "a strip of 150 kilometers" on the boundary between the municipalities of Salinas de Garci Mendoza, Pampa Aullagas, and Santuario de Quillacas (in Oruro) and Uyuni (in Potosí) is subject to long-running disputes, since at least the mid-20th century. The Instituto Geográfico Militar attempted to resolve the dispute in 1989, but did not receive historical documents from the northern, Oruro side. A further attempt a demarcation was ordered by a court in 2002, responding to a Potosí department lawsuit, but this process was annulled in 2008. In 2006, residents of the four municipalities agreed to avoid agricultural planting in the disputed territory.

Residents of the locality of Coroma (in Uyuni municipality, Potosí) and Santuario de Quillacas municipality (in Oruro) dispute ownership of the Pahua hill, known to contain limestone and reputed to contain uranium. Resolving the dispute over agricultural fields and the hill, as well as constructing a cement plant in Coroma became demands of the 2010 regional strike led by the Potosí Civic Committee.
