= Santa Fe, Oruro =

Coordinates: 17.5342°S 67.1436°W

Santa Fe (Oruro)
- Town
- Interactive map of Santa Fe (Oruro)
- Country: Bolivia
- Time zone: UTC-4 (BOT)

Santa Fe is a small town in Bolivia. It is located in the Oruro Department.
