= Inka Pukara =

Inka Pukara (Aymara and Quechua for "Inca fortress", also spelled Inca Pucara) may refer to:

- Inka Pukara (Cochabamba), a mountain in the Cochabamba Department, Bolivia
- Inka Pukara (La Paz), a mountain in the La Paz Department, Bolivia
- Inka Pukara (Oruro), a mountain in the Oruro Department, Bolivia
