= Nor Carangas Province =

Nor Carangas
- Province
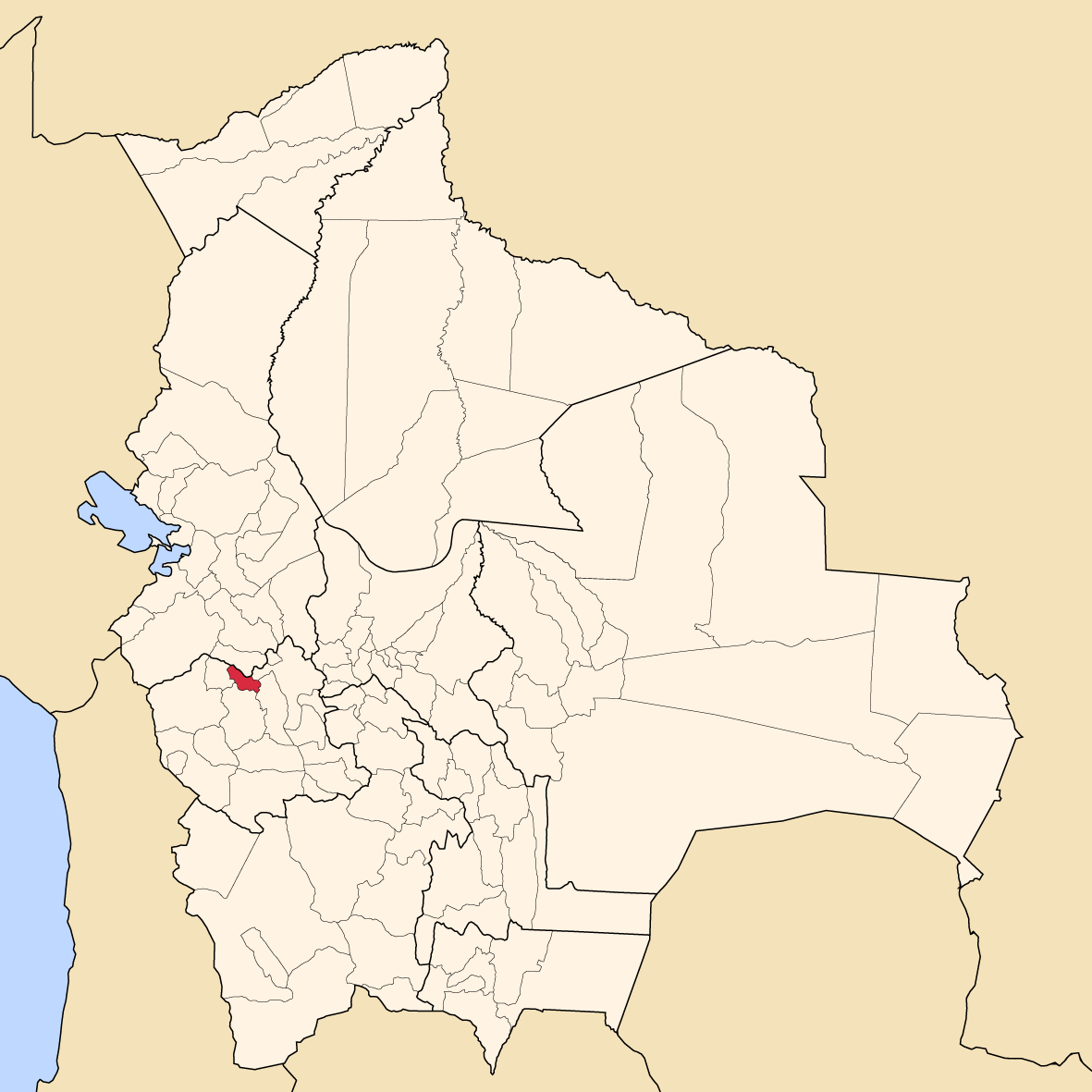
- Location of Nor Carangas Province within Bolivia
- Coordinates: 17°58′S 67°27′W
- Country: Bolivia
- Department: Oruro
- Capital: Huayllamarca

Area
  - Total: 864 km^{2} (334 sq mi)

Population (2024 census)
  - Total: 5,980
  - Density: 6.92/km^{2} (17.9/sq mi)
  - Ethnicities: Aymara

Languages spoken (2001)
  - Aymara: 96%
  - Spanish: 84%
  - Quechua: 14%

Sectors
- Time zone: UTC-4 (BOT)

Nor Carangas is a province in the northern parts of the Bolivian department of Oruro. Its seat is Huayllamarca.

== Location ==
Nor Carangas province is one of sixteen provinces in the Oruro Department. It is located between 17° 46' and 18° 09' South and between 67° 13' and 67° 41' West.

The province borders La Paz Department in the north, San Pedro de Totora Province in the west, Carangas Province in the south, Saucarí Province in the southeast, and Cercado Province in the northeast.

The province extends over 70 km from northwest to southeast, and 25 km from northeast to southwest.

== Geography ==
Some of the highest mountains of the province are listed below:

- Anta Qullu
- Apachita
- Chuwallani
- Iru Pampa
- Kimsa Qullu
- Lawrani
- Lupi Qullu
- Lluxita
- Nasa Qullu
- Nina Qullu
- Qutaña Pata
- Taypi Sirka
- Wila Chullpa

== Population ==
Main idiom of the province is Aymara, spoken by 96%, while 84% of the population speak Spanish and 14% Quechua (1992).

The population increased from 4,900 inhabitants (1992 census) to 5,790 (2001 census), an increase of 18.2%. - 41.9% of the population are younger than 15 years old (1992).

99.7% of the population have no access to electricity, 98.7% have no sanitary facilities (1992).

84.5% of the population are employed in agriculture, 0.1% in mining, 3.1% in industry, 12.3% in general services (2001).

80% of the population are Catholics, 15% are Protestants (1992).

== Division ==
The province comprises only one municipality, Huayllamarca Municipality. It is identical to Nor Carangas Province.

== See also ==
- Jach'a Jawira
