= Pukara (Antiti) =

Mountain in Bolivia

- Location within Bolivia

Highest point
- Elevation: 4,040 m (13,250 ft)
- Coordinates: 17°52′27″S 68°12′39″W

Geography
- Location: Bolivia, Oruro Department
- Parent range: Andes

Pukara (Aymara for fortress, also spelled Pucara) is a mountain in the Andes of Bolivia which reaches a height of approximately 4,040 m (13,250 ft). It is located in the Oruro Department, San Pedro de Totora Province. Pukara lies west of T'iwu (Tibo), southwest of the village and the mountain named Antiti at a lake named Ch'uxña Quta ("green lake", also spelled Chojña Kkota).
