= Saucarí Province =

Province in Oruro, Bolivia

Saucarí
- Province
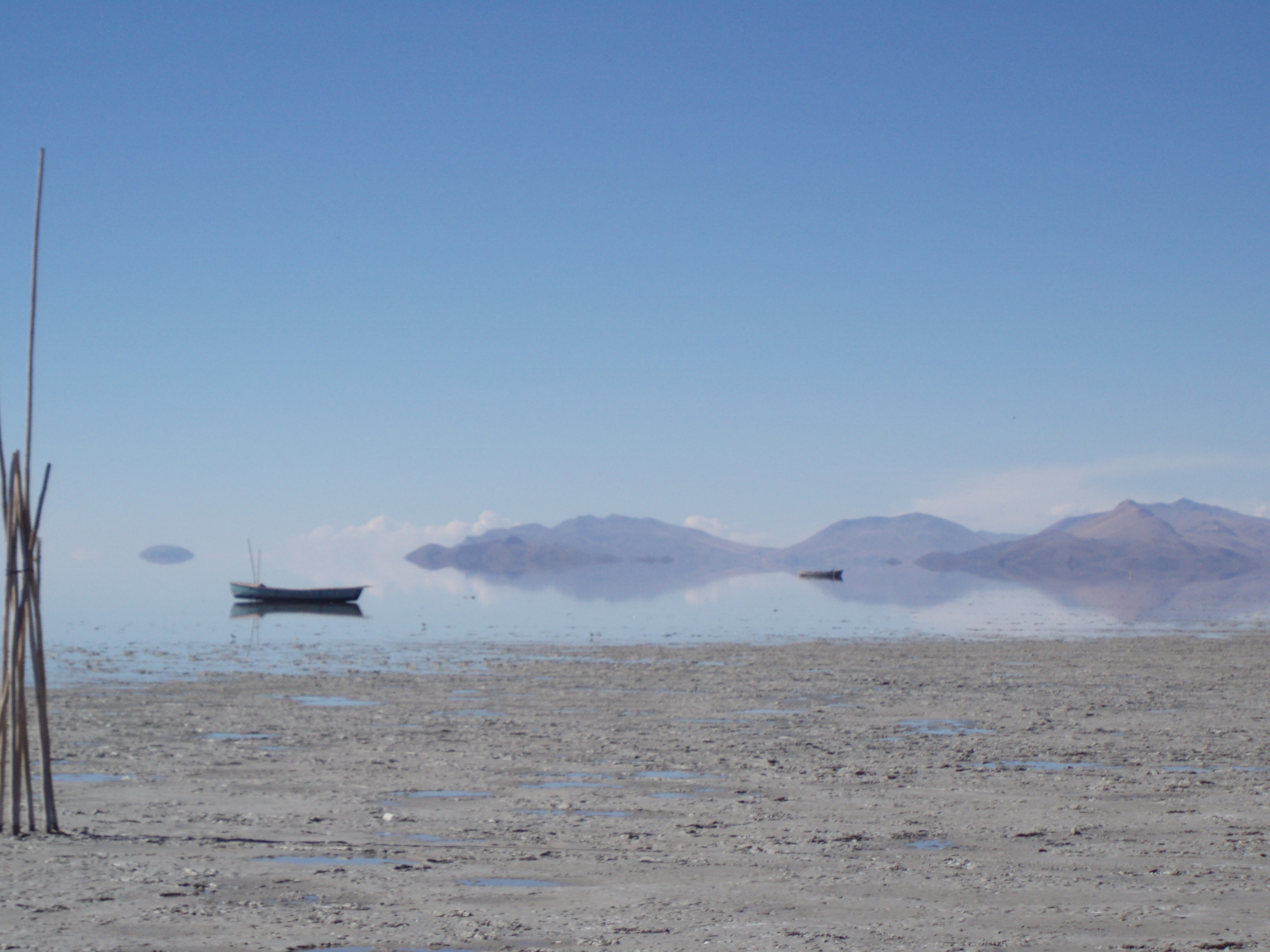
- Fishing boat at Poopó Lake

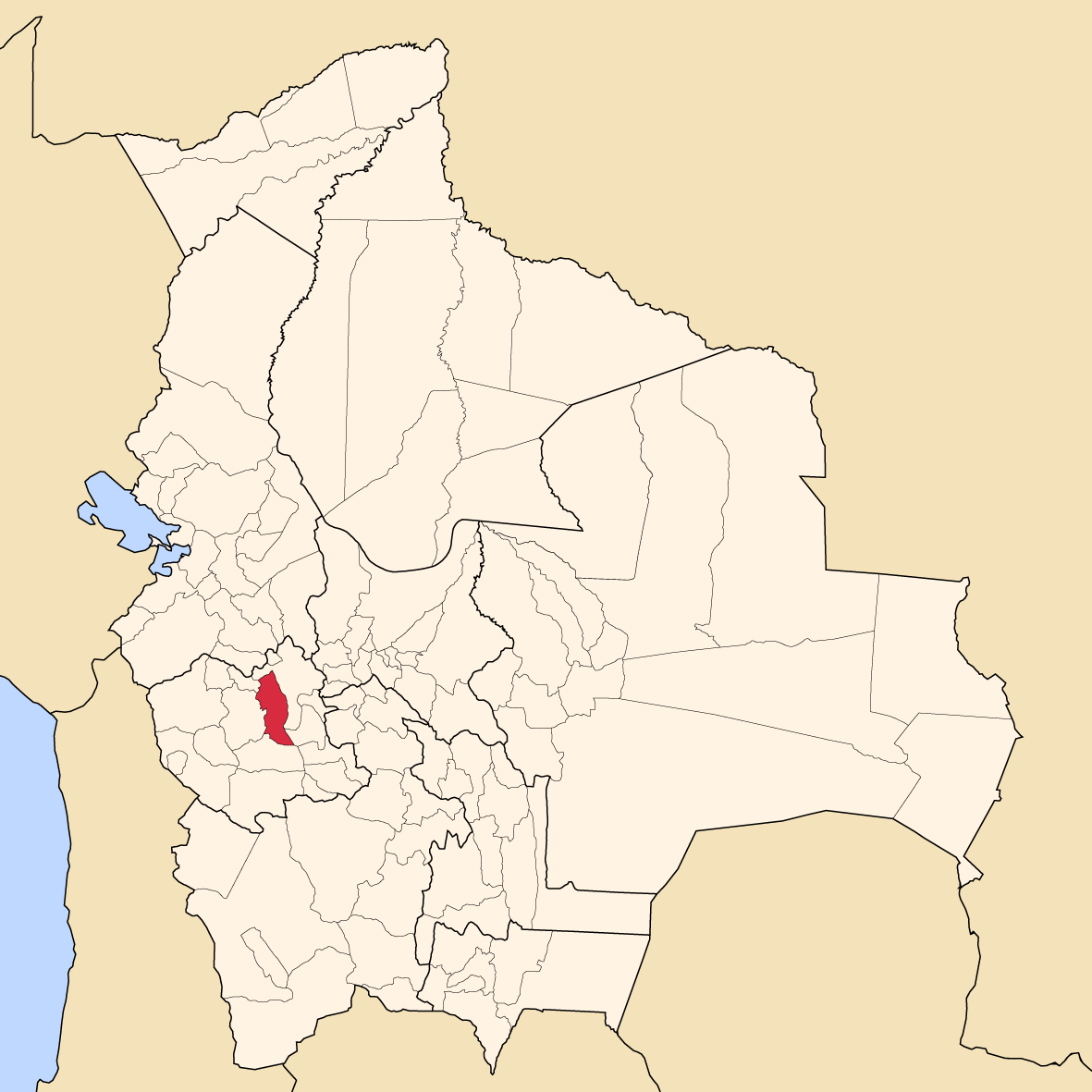
- Location of Saucarí Province in Bolivia
- Coordinates: 18°19′S 67°02′W
- Country: Bolivia
- Department: Oruro
- Capital: Sabaya

Area
  - Total: 2,986 km^{2} (1,153 sq mi)

Population (2024 census)
  - Total: 12,115
  - Density: 4.057/km^{2} (10.51/sq mi)
  - Ethnicities: Aymara

Languages spoken (2001)
  - Spanish: 84%%
  - Aymara: 83%%
  - Quechua: 37%

Sectors
- Time zone: UTC-4 (BOT)
- Area code: 591 2
- Catholic: 83%
- Protestant: 14%

Saucarí is a province in the central area of the Bolivian department of Oruro. Its seat is Toledo.

== Location ==
Saucarí province is one of the sixteen provinces in the Oruro Department. It is located between 17° 50' and 18° 47' South and between 66° 47' and 67° 17' West.

The province borders Cercado Province in the north and east, Nor Carangas Province in the northwest, Carangas Province in the west, Sud Carangas Province in the south, and Poopó Province in the southeast.

The province extends over 115 km from North to South, and 40 km from East to West.

== Population ==
The main language of the province is Spanish, spoken by 84%, 83% of the population speak Aymara and 37% speak Quechua (1992).

The population increased from 5,569 inhabitants (1992 census) to 7,763 (2001 census), an increase of 39%. - 33.6% of the population are younger than 15 years old (1992).

82% of the population have no access to electricity, 96% have no sanitary facilities (1992).

75.2% of the population are employed in agriculture, 2.6% in mining, 5.6% in industry, 16.6% in general services (2001).

83% of the population are Catholics, 14% are Protestants (1992).

== Division ==
The province comprises only one municipality, Toledo. It is identical to the province Suacarí.
