= Huayllamarca =

Coordinates: 17.8375°S 67.9433°W

Huayllamarca Wayllamarka
- Town
- Interactive map of Huayllamarca
- Country: Bolivia
- Time zone: UTC-4 (BOT)

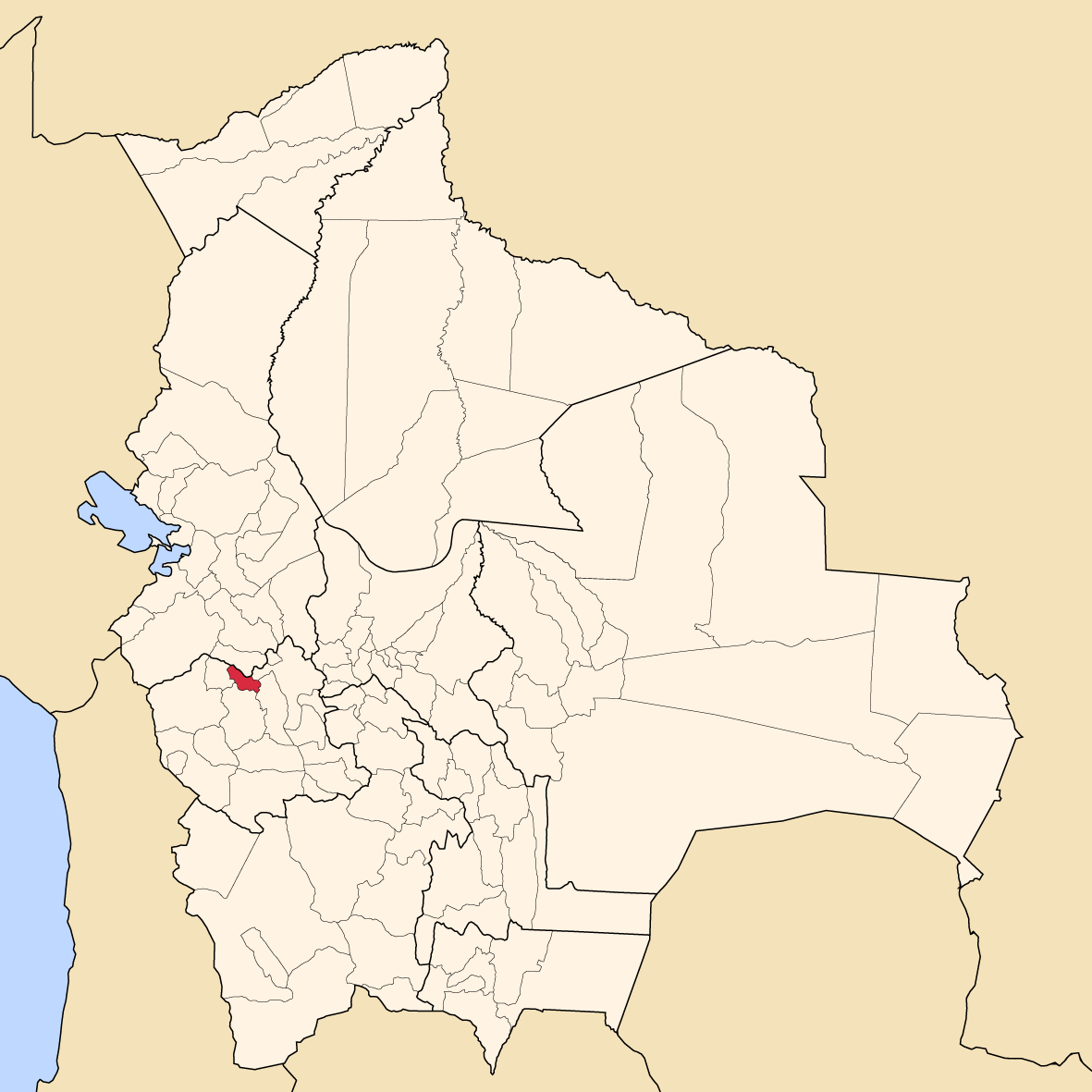
Map of Bolivia showing Nor Carangas province, Oruro.

Huayllamarca is a small town in Bolivia, capital of the Province of Nor Carangas in the northern region of the Department of Oruro. The city appears in a music video for Los Kjarkas.
