= Jayu Quta (Ladislao Cabrera) =

Crater in Bolivia

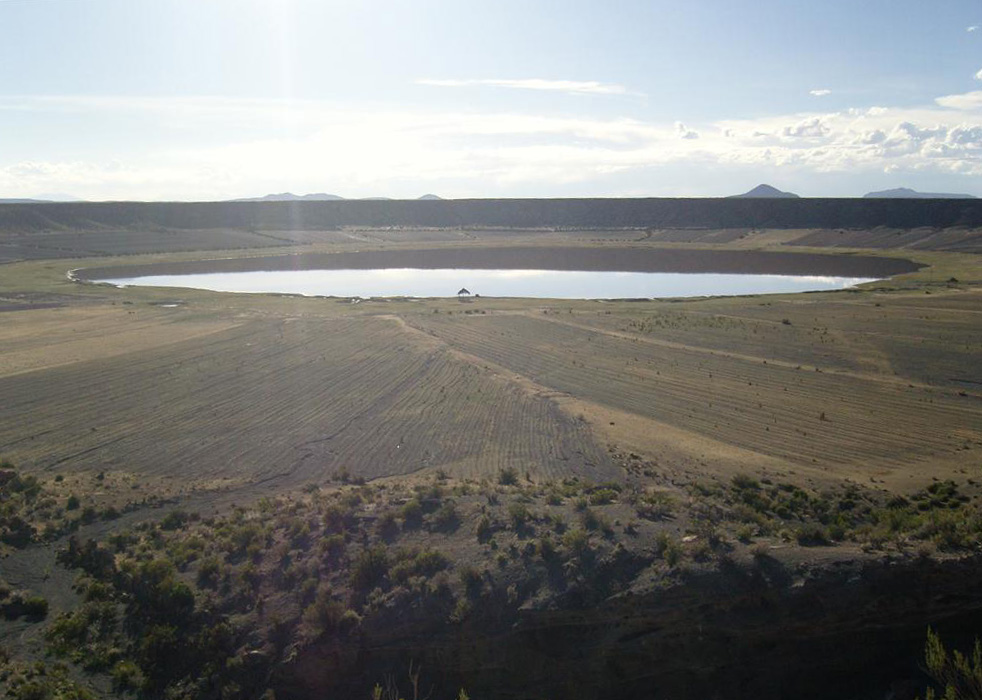

Highest point
- Elevation: 3,650 m (11,980 ft)
- Coordinates: 19.463°S 67.432°W

Geography
- Location within Bolivia Location within South America
- Location: Bolivia
- Parent range: Andes

Geology
- Mountain type: Maar
- Last eruption: Unknown

Jayu Quta (Aymara jayu salt, quta lake, "salt lake", also spelled Jayo Khota, Jayu Khota, Jayu Kkota) is a maar partially filled with water, in the Bolivian Altiplano, north of the Salar de Uyuni and east of the Salar de Coipasa. It is situated in the Oruro Department, Ladislao Cabrera Province, Salinas de Garci Mendoza Municipality, Villa Esperanza Canton. It was originally misidentified as a meteorite impact crater.

A smaller maar, named Ñiq'i Quta ("mud lake", Nekhe Khota, Nekhe Kkota), is located southwest of Jayu Quta.

Volcanic activity of phreatomagmatic nature formed the maars, probably during the Holocene. During this activity, basalt-trachyandesite rocks were ejected, including xenoliths consisting of granite. These maars belong to a group of volcanic centres in the Altiplano. These centres mostly consist of lava flows of trachyandesitic to dacitic composition.

The maars appear to form a lineament with Ch'iyar Qullu. However, in terms of Pb isotope ratios and geochemistry the eruption products of the maars bear no resemblance to these at Chiyar Qullu. Potassium-argon dating has yielded an age of less than 128,000 years ago on a lava bomb on Ñiq'i Quta.

== See also ==
- List of volcanoes in Bolivia
- Tunupa
