= Chullpa =

Ancient Aymara funerary tower

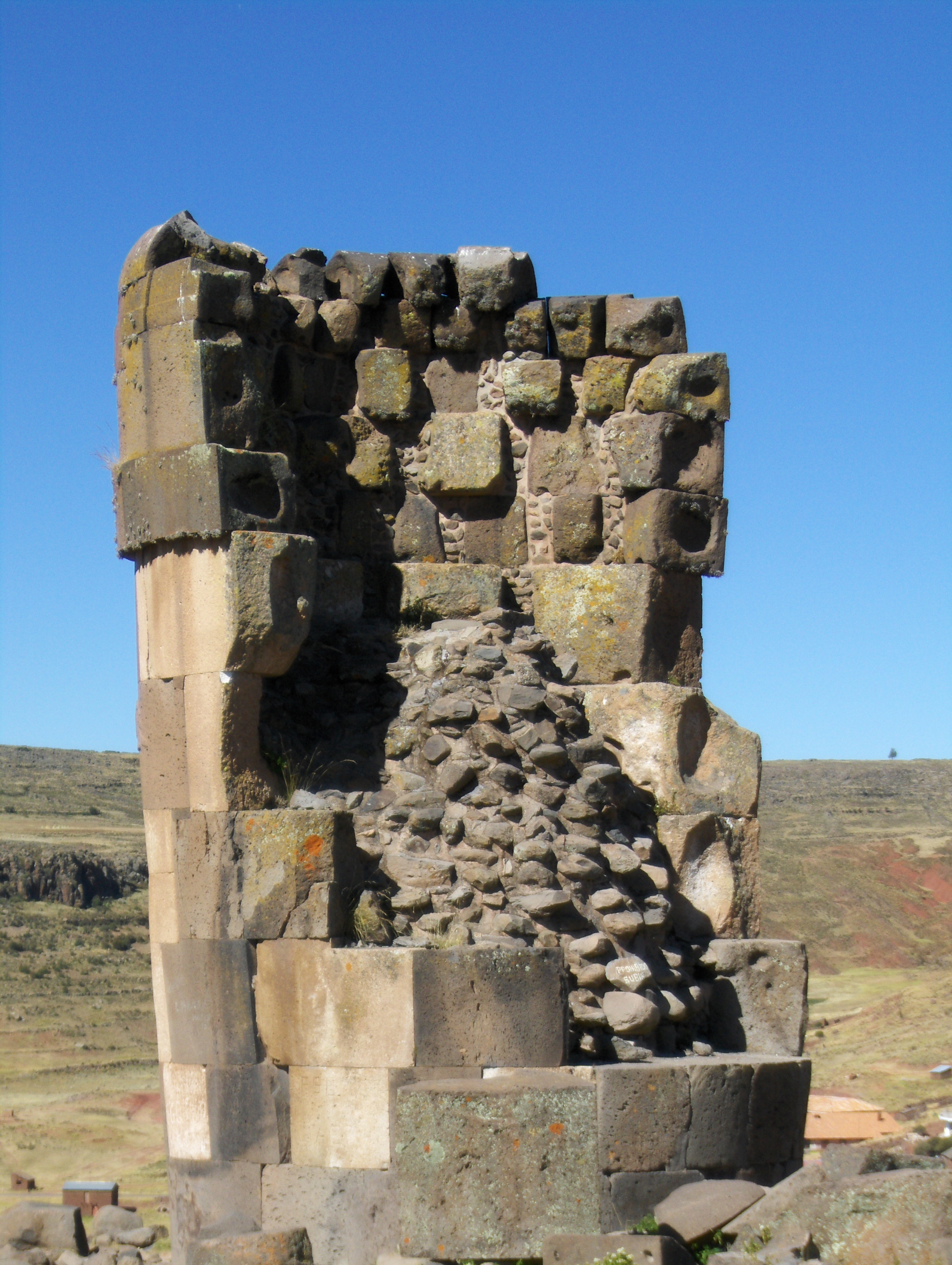
A chullpa at Sillustani, near Lake Titicaca, Peru.

A chullpa is an ancient Aymara funerary tower originally constructed for a noble person or noble family. Chullpas are found across the Altiplano in Peru and Bolivia. The tallest are about 12 metres (39 ft) high.

The tombs at Sillustani in Peru are the most famous. Recent research has focused on the connection between chullpas and the ritual pathways etched into the landscape around Nevado Sajama, as well as possible patterns within chullpa sites.

== Description ==
Corpses in each tomb were typically placed in a fetal position along with some of their belongings, including clothing and common equipment.

In virtually all cases, the only opening to the tomb faces the rising sun in the east. The construction of the chullpa varied with ethnic group: in general, those of the north Altiplano are circular and constructed with stone, while those of the south are rectangular and constructed with adobe.

Some are unadorned, while others have intricate carvings. At Sillustani, many of the chullpas have lizards, which were considered a symbol of life because they could regenerate their tails, carved into the stone.

== Similar tombs ==
It is possible that chullpas were also used by the Inca following their conquest of the Aymara.

Very similar stone constructions on Easter Island known as tupa have sometimes been suspected to be closely related to chullpas.

== See also ==
- Inka Murata
- Jach'a Phasa
- Kuntur Amaya
- Kunturmarka
- Kutimpu
- Markahirka
- Ninamarka
- Qulu Qulu
- Uskallaqta
- Wanqaran
- Wich'un
- Early and simple domes
