= Mañasu (Bolivia) =

Mountain in Bolivia

- Location within Bolivia

Highest point
- Elevation: 4,171 m (13,684 ft)
- Coordinates: 17°54′21″S 68°10′44″W

Geography
- Location: Bolivia, Oruro Department
- Parent range: Andes

Mañasu (Aymara for butcher, also spelled Mañazo) is a 4,171-metre-high (13,684 ft) mountain in the Andes of Bolivia. It is located in the Oruro Department, San Pedro de Totora Province. The Juch'us Jawira ("slim river") originates at the mountain. It flows to the northwest.
