= Sud Carangas Province =

Province of Bolivia

Provincia Sud Carangas
- Province
- Interactive map of Provincia Sud Carangas
- Coordinates: 18°53′S 67°06′W
- Country: Bolivia
- Department: Oruro

Area
  - Total: 3,731 km^{2} (1,441 sq mi)

Dimensions
  - Length: 60 km (37 mi)
  - Width: 100 km (62 mi)

Population (2001)
  - Total: 6,136
  - Density: 1.645/km^{2} (4.259/sq mi)
- ISO 3166 code: BO.OR.SC

Sud Carangas is a province in the central parts of the Bolivian department of Oruro. Its capital is Santiago de Andamarca.

== Location ==
Sud Carangas province is one of the sixteen provinces in the Oruro Department. It is located between 18° 38' and 19° 09' South and between 66° 37' and 67° 34' West.

The province borders Saucarí Province in the North, Carangas Province in the Northwest, Litoral Province in the West, Ladislao Cabrera Province in the South, Sebastián Pagador Province in the Southeast, Eduardo Avaroa Province in the East, and Poopó Province in the Northeast. The province borders Poopó Lake in the East.

The province extends over 60 kilometres (37 mi) from North to South, and 100 kilometres (62 mi) from East to West.

== Population ==
The population increased from 4,028 inhabitants (1992 census) to 6,136 (2001 census), an increase of 52%.

At the 1992 census, the main language of the province was Aymara, spoken by 96.5%, while 78.1% of the population spoke Spanish and 46.0% Quechua. 74.8% of the population were Catholics and 18.9% were Protestants. 99.9% of the population had no access to electricity and 98.7% had no sanitary facilities. 41.1% of the population was younger than 15 years old.

At the 2001 census, 77.9% of the population were employed in agriculture, 4.1% in industry, and 18.0% in general services.

== Division ==
The province comprises two municipalities which are further subdivided into cantons.

| Section | Municipality | Seat |
|---|---|---|
| 1st | Andamarca Municipality | Andamarca |
| 2nd | Belén de Andamarca Municipality | Belén de Andamarca |
