= Kimsa Chata (Carangas) =

Mountain in Bolivia

- Location within Bolivia

Highest point
- Elevation: 4,648 m (15,249 ft)
- Coordinates: 18°6′35″S 67°39′44″W

Geography
- Location: Bolivia, Oruro Department, Carangas Province
- Parent range: Andes

Kimsa Chata (Aymara and Quechua kimsa three, Pukina chata mountain, "three mountains", hispanicized spellings Quimsa Chata, Quimsachata, Quinsa Chata) is a mountain in the Andes of Bolivia, about 4,648 m (15,249 ft) high. It is one of the highest elevations of the Waylla Marka mountain range that runs down from Waylla Marka (Huayllamarca) to Qhurqhi (Corque) west of Uru Uru Lake. Kimsa Chata is located in the Oruro Department, Carangas Province, Qhurqhi Municipality, Tarukachi Canton, or on the border of the Carangas Province and the Saucari Province.
