= Ch'alla Willk'i (Totora) =

Mountain in Bolivia

- Location within Bolivia

Highest point
- Elevation: 4,182 m (13,720 ft)
- Coordinates: 17°53′20″S 68°17′45″W

Geography
- Location: Bolivia, Oruro Department
- Parent range: Andes

Ch'alla Willk'i (Aymara ch'alla sand, willk'i gap, "sand gap", also spelled Challa Willkhi) is a 4,182-metre-high (13,720 ft) mountain in the Andes of Bolivia. It is located in the Oruro Department, San Pedro de Totora Province. The Luk'i Jawira (Lokhe Jahuira) originates north of Ch'alla Willk'i. It flows to the northwest.
