= Corque =

Corque Qhurqhi
- Town
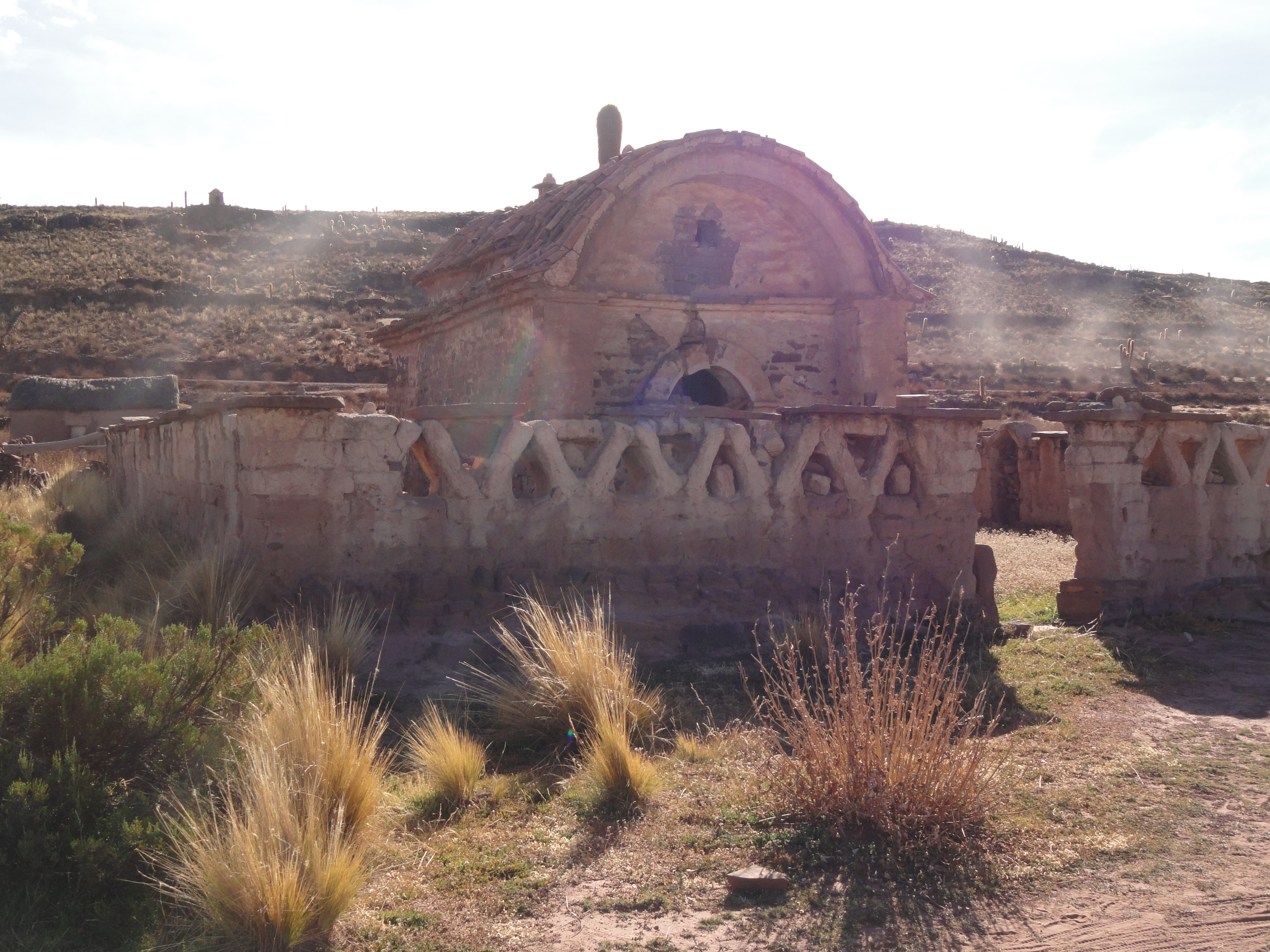
- Templo de Jancokala

- Location within Bolivia
- Coordinates: 18°21′S 67°41′W
- Country: Bolivia
- Time zone: UTC-4 (BOT)

Corque or Qhurqhi (Aymara) is a small town in Bolivia. In 2009 it had an estimated population of 1017.
