= Andamarca, Oruro =

Santiago de Andamarca Antamarka
- Village
- Location within Bolivia
- Coordinates: 18°47′S 67°30′W
- Country: Bolivia
- Department: Oruro Department
- Province: Sud Carangas Province
- Municipality: Santiago de Andamarca Municipality
- Elevation: 12,297 ft (3,748 m)

Population (2001)
  - Total: 302
  - Ethnicities: Aymara
- Time zone: UTC-4 (BOT)

Santiago de Andamarca is a small location in Bolivia in the Oruro Department, Sud Carangas Province. It is the seat of the Santiago de Andamarca Municipality. In 2010 the village had an estimated population of 374.

== Climate ==
Climate data for Andamarca, Oruro, elevation 3,762 m (12,343 ft), (1977–2013)
Month	Jan	Feb	Mar	Apr	May	Jun	Jul	Aug	Sep	Oct	Nov	Dec	Year
Record high °C (°F)	25.0 (77.0)	24.5 (76.1)	24.0 (75.2)	22.5 (72.5)	20.5 (68.9)	20.0 (68.0)	20.0 (68.0)	20.5 (68.9)	23.5 (74.3)	23.5 (74.3)	25.4 (77.7)	24.5 (76.1)	25.4 (77.7)
Mean daily maximum °C (°F)	19.0 (66.2)	19.0 (66.2)	18.4 (65.1)	18.2 (64.8)	16.2 (61.2)	15.3 (59.5)	15.3 (59.5)	16.6 (61.9)	18.2 (64.8)	19.6 (67.3)	20.6 (69.1)	20.0 (68.0)	18.0 (64.5)
Daily mean °C (°F)	12.0 (53.6)	12.1 (53.8)	11.2 (52.2)	9.5 (49.1)	6.4 (43.5)	5.3 (41.5)	4.7 (40.5)	6.0 (42.8)	8.2 (46.8)	10.0 (50.0)	11.6 (52.9)	12.2 (54.0)	9.1 (48.4)
Mean daily minimum °C (°F)	5.0 (41.0)	5.1 (41.2)	4.0 (39.2)	0.8 (33.4)	−3.4 (25.9)	−4.7 (23.5)	−5.8 (21.6)	−4.5 (23.9)	−1.7 (28.9)	0.3 (32.5)	2.6 (36.7)	4.4 (39.9)	0.2 (32.3)
Record low °C (°F)	−2.6 (27.3)	−3.6 (25.5)	−3.0 (26.6)	−5.4 (22.3)	−9.5 (14.9)	−13.0 (8.6)	−12.2 (10.0)	−13.0 (8.6)	−9.5 (14.9)	−8.5 (16.7)	−5.4 (22.3)	−1.5 (29.3)	−13.0 (8.6)
Average precipitation mm (inches)	99.2 (3.91)	70.8 (2.79)	38.6 (1.52)	7.3 (0.29)	1.3 (0.05)	0.4 (0.02)	1.1 (0.04)	0.6 (0.02)	4.4 (0.17)	9.4 (0.37)	13.1 (0.52)	49.9 (1.96)	296.1 (11.66)
Average precipitation days (≥ 1.0 mm)	14.2	12.4	7.1	2.1	0.3	0.1	0.1	0.4	1.0	1.6	2.1	7.5	48.9
Source: Servicio Nacional de Meteorología e Hidrología de Bolivia
