= Huachacalla =

Coordinates: 18°47′S 68°16′W

Huachacalla Wachaqalla
- Town
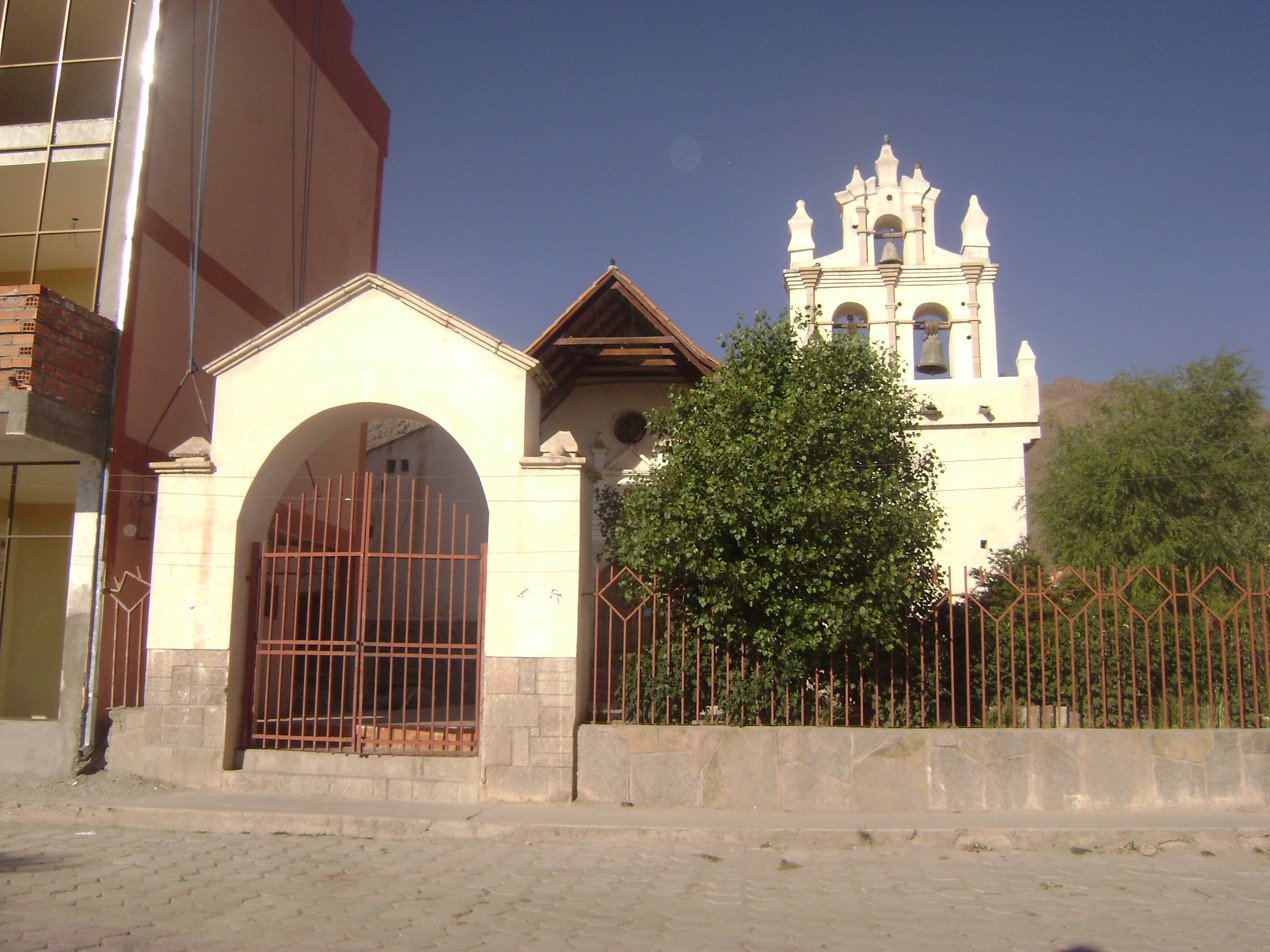
- Church of Huachacalla
- Interactive map of Huachacalla
- Country: Bolivia
- Province: Litoral Province
- Municipality: Huachacalla Municipality
- Time zone: UTC-4 (BOT)

Huachacalla is a small town in the Litoral Province of the Oruro Department in Bolivia. It is the seat of the Huachacalla Municipality.

== Climate ==
Climate data for Huachacalla, elevation 3,740 m (12,270 ft)
Month	Jan	Feb	Mar	Apr	May	Jun	Jul	Aug	Sep	Oct	Nov	Dec	Year
Mean daily maximum °C (°F)	19.2 (66.6)	19.6 (67.3)	19.2 (66.6)	19.0 (66.2)	17.8 (64.0)	16.7 (62.1)	16.2 (61.2)	17.2 (63.0)	17.8 (64.0)	19.9 (67.8)	21.1 (70.0)	20.6 (69.1)	18.7 (65.7)
Daily mean °C (°F)	10.7 (51.3)	10.7 (51.3)	10.6 (51.1)	7.8 (46.0)	5.3 (41.5)	5.0 (41.0)	3.3 (37.9)	5.6 (42.1)	6.2 (43.2)	8.6 (47.5)	10.3 (50.5)	11.1 (52.0)	7.9 (46.3)
Mean daily minimum °C (°F)	1.9 (35.4)	1.8 (35.2)	2.1 (35.8)	−3.5 (25.7)	−7.1 (19.2)	−7.9 (17.8)	−9.8 (14.4)	−6.6 (20.1)	−5.9 (21.4)	−3.1 (26.4)	−0.4 (31.3)	1.7 (35.1)	−3.1 (26.5)
Average precipitation mm (inches)	135 (5.3)	102 (4.0)	76 (3.0)	9 (0.4)	1 (0.0)	0 (0)	0 (0)	1 (0.0)	4 (0.2)	15 (0.6)	25 (1.0)	75 (3.0)	443 (17.5)
Average relative humidity (%)	65	71	72	62	56	52	55	53	54	53	55	57	59
Source: Plataforma digital única del Estado Peruano
