= Oruro Department =

Coordinates: 18°40′S 67°40′W

Oruro Departamento de Oruro (Spanish) Ururu jach'a suyu (Aymara)
- Department
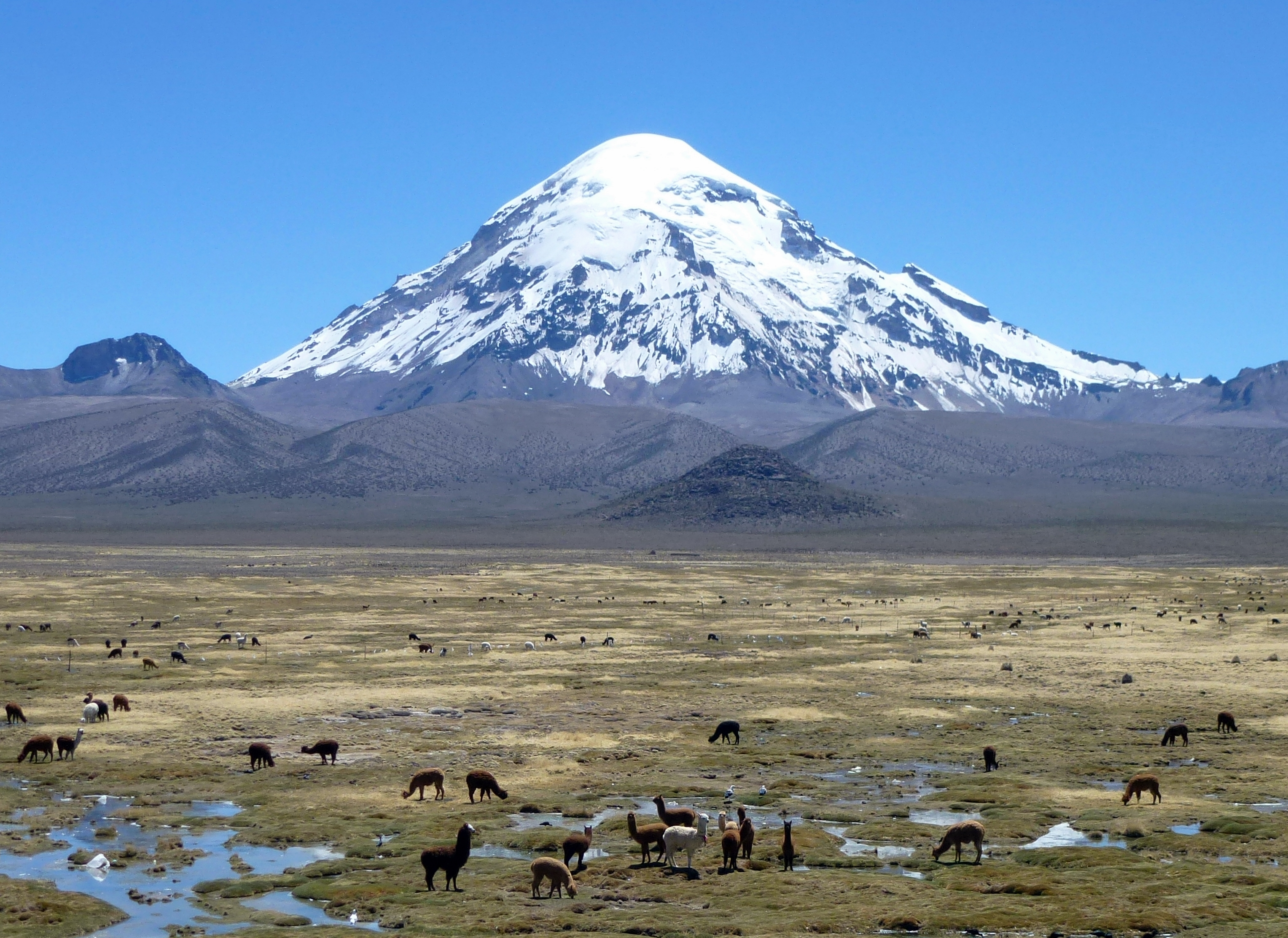
- Sajama National Park

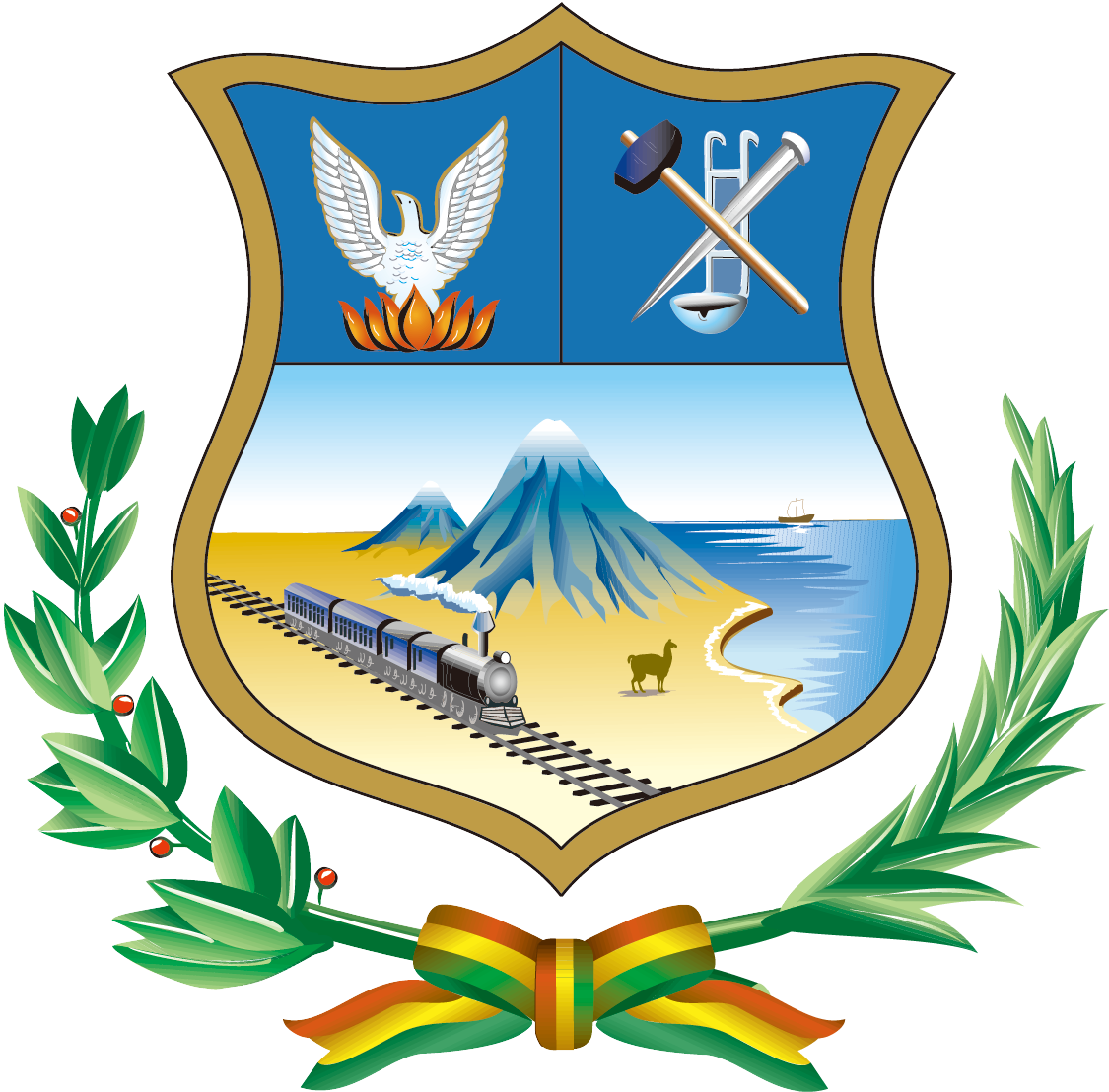
- Flag Coat of arms

- Location within Bolivia
- Country: Bolivia
- Capital: Oruro
- Provinces: 16

Government
  - Body: Departmental Legislative Assembly of Oruro
  - Governor: Johnny Franklin Vedia (MAS-IPSP)

Area
  - Total: 53,588 km^{2} (20,690 sq mi)

Population (2024 census)
  - Total: 570,194
  - Density: 10.640/km^{2} (27.558/sq mi)
- Time zone: UTC-4 (BOT)
- ISO 3166-2: BO-O
- Languages: Spanish, Quechua, Aymara
- HDI (2019): 0.727 high · 4th of 9
- GDP (2023): constant Dollar of 2015
- Total: US$ 1.6 billion Int$ 3.7 billion (PPP)
- Per capita: US$ 2,700; Int$ 6,400 (PPP)
- Website: www.preforuro.gov.bo

Oruro (Spanish pronunciation: [oˈɾuɾo]; Quechua: Uru Uru; Aymara: Ururu) is a department of Bolivia, with an area of 53,588 km^{2} (20,690 sq mi). Its capital is the city of Oruro. According to the 2012 census, the Oruro department had a population of 494,178.

== Provinces of Oruro ==
The department is divided into 16 provinces which are further subdivided into municipalities and cantons.

Province	Map #	Area (km^{2})	Population (2012 census)	Capital
Carangas	10	5,472	11,041	Corque
Cercado	2	5,766	309,277	Oruro
Eduardo Avaroa	5	4,015	33,248	Challapata
Ladislao Cabrera	12	8,818	14,678	Salinas de Garci Mendoza
Litoral	13	2,894	10,409	Huachacalla
Nor Carangas	8	870	5,502	Huayllamarca
Pantaleón Dalence	3	1,210	29,497	Huanuni
Poopó	4	3,061	16,775	Poopó
Puerto de Mejillones	16	785	2,076	La Rivera
Sabaya	15	5,885	10,924	Sabaya
Sajama	14	5,790	9,390	Curahuara de Carangas
San Pedro de Totora	9	1,487	5,531	Totora
Saucarí	7	1,671	10,149	Toledo
Sebastian Pagador	6	1,972	13,153	Santiago de Huari
Sud Carangas	11	3,536	7,231	Santiago de Andamarca
Tomás Barrón	1	356	5,267	Eucaliptus

Note: Eduardo Abaroa Province (#5) is both north of and south of Sebastián Pagador Province (#6).

== Government ==
=== Executive offices ===
The chief executive officer of Bolivian departments (since May 2010) is the governor; until then, the office was called the prefect, and until 2006 the prefect was appointed by the president of Bolivia. The current governor, Johnny Franklin Vedia Rodríguez of the Movement for Socialism – Political Instrument for the Sovereignty of the Peoples, was elected on 7 March 2021.

Took office	Office expired	Prefect/Governor	Party	Notes
22 Jan 2006	30 May 2010	Alberto Luís Aguilar Calle	MAS-IPSP	First elected prefect. Elected in Bolivian general election, December 2005
30 May 2010	31 May 2015	Santos Javier Tito Véliz	MAS-IPSP	Elected in the first round of the regional election on 4 April 2010; first governor.
31 May 2015	19 Nov 2019	Víctor Hugo Vásquez Mamani	MAS-IPSP	Elected in the first round of the regional election on 29 March 2015.
19 Nov 2019	31 May 2020	Zenón Pizarro Garisto (interim)	MAS-IPSP	
31 May 2020	3 May 2021	Edson Milton Oczachoque Gerónimo (interim)	MAS-IPSP	
3 May 2021		Johnny Franklin Vedia Rodríguez	MAS-IPSP	Elected in the first round of the regional election on 7 March 2021.

=== Legislature ===
The chief legislative body of the department is the Departmental Legislative Assembly, a body also first elected on 4 April 2010. It consists of 33 members: 16 elected by each of the department's provinces; 16 elected based on proportional representation; and minority indigenous representative selected by the Uru-Chipaya people.

After the regional election on 7 March 2021, the legislature met for its first session of 3 May 2021 and elected a new executive committee consisting of Edwin Fuentes Camacho as president and Delia Gongora Veliz as vice-president.

== Demographics ==
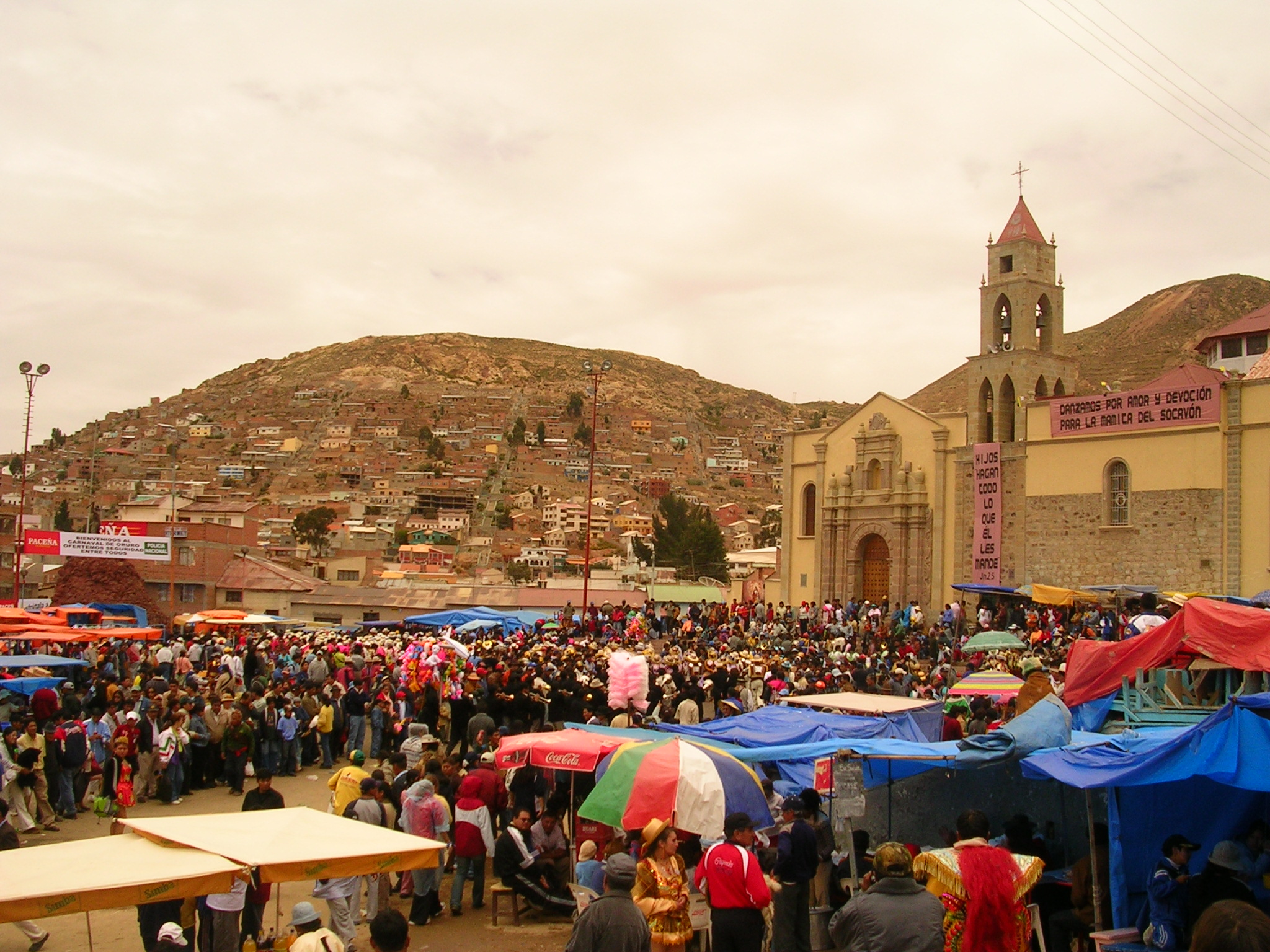
Sanctuary of the Virgin of Socavon, Carnival of Oruro 2007.

Historical population
Year	Pop.	±% p.a.
1976	310,409	—
1992	340,114	+0.57%
2001	391,870	+1.59%
2012	494,587	+2.14%
2024	570,194	+1.19%
Source: Citypopulation

== Languages ==
The languages spoken in the department are mainly Spanish, Quechua and Aymara. The following table shows the number of those belonging to the recognised group of speakers.

Language	Department	Bolivia
Quechua	134,289	2,281,198
Aymara	127,086	1,525,321
Guaraní	383	62,575
Another native	1,943	49,432
Spanish	342,332	6,821,626
Foreign	6,878	250,754
Only native	30,745	960,491
Native and Spanish	188,963	2,739,407
Spanish and foreign	153,439	4,115,751

== Notable people ==
- Evo Morales, Bolivian president from 2006 to 2019, was born in the village of Isallawi near Orinoca.
- Zulma Yugar, a Bolivian politician and folk singer.

== Places of interest ==
- Sajama National Park
- Parinacota Volcano
- Sajama Lines
- Poopó Lake
- Lake Uru Uru
- Paria, first Spanish settlement in Bolivia, former Inca city.

== See also ==
- Oruro Symphony Orchestra
- Oruro–Potosí boundary conflicts
- Santa Fe, Oruro
- Juan Mendoza Airport
