= Pumuta =

Mountain in Bolivia

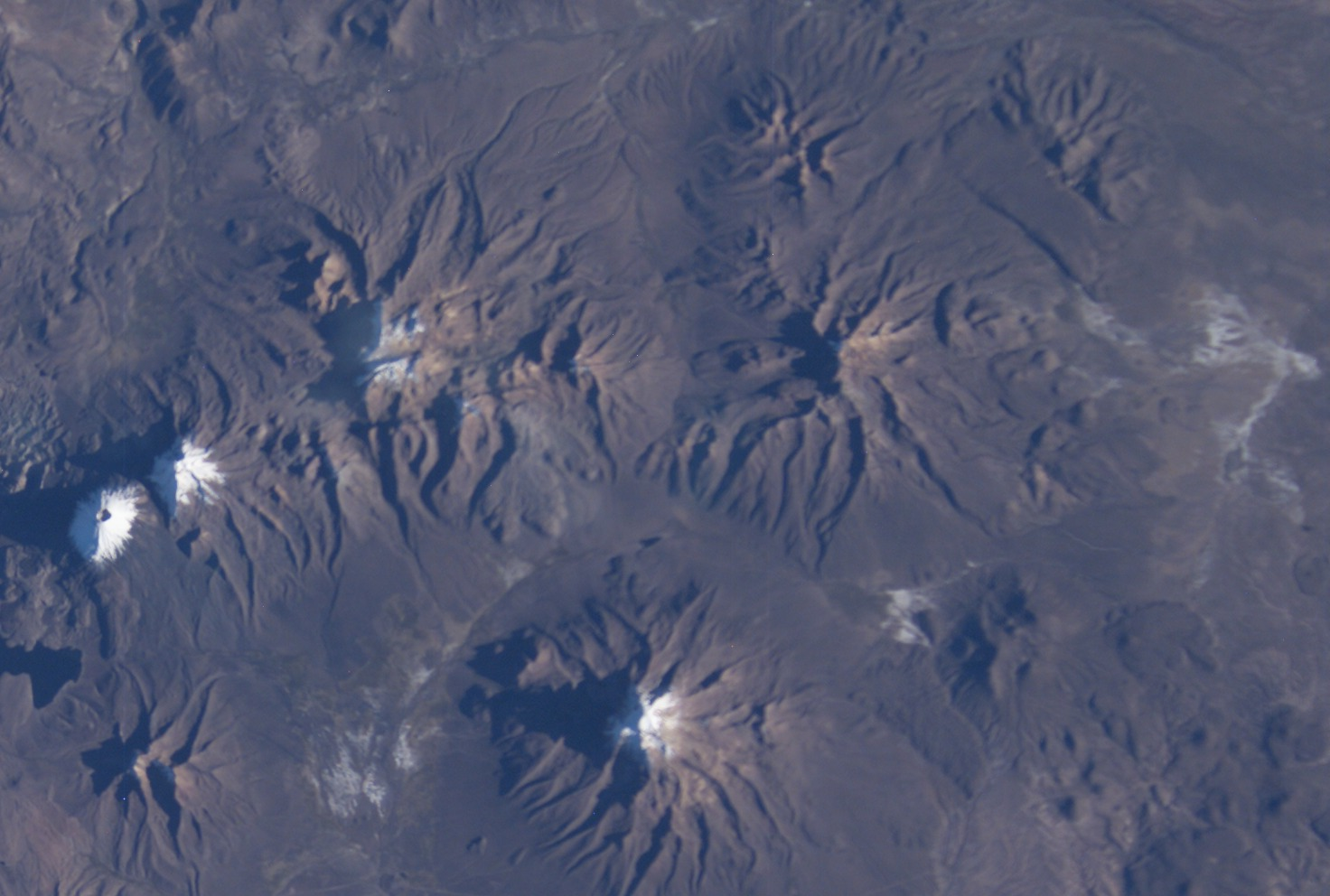
- Jisk'a Kunturiri is located NW of Nevado Sajama (the latter is in the lower center of this NASA image, with north to the top right corner). From left to right there are the snow-covered mountains of Paya Chata, Kunturiri, and Jisk'a Kunturiri and Pumuta (a bit below it to the right ).

Highest point
- Elevation: 5,200 m (17,100 ft)
- Coordinates: 18°01′48″S 69°01′12″W

Geography
- Location within Bolivia
- Location: Bolivia, Oruro Department
- Parent range: Andes

Pumuta (Aymara puma cougar, puma, uta house, "puma house") is a mountain in the Andes of Bolivia, about 5,200 metres (17,060 ft) high. It is situated in the Oruro Department, Sajama Province, Curahuara de Carangas Municipality, Sajama Canton, north-west of the extinct Sajama volcano. Pumuta lies south-west of the mountain Jach'a Kunturiri and north-east to east of the mountains Kunturiri and Jisk'a Kunturiri.

The Kunturiri River originates south of the mountain. It flows to the south and then to the east as a tributary of the Sajama River.

== See also ==
- Sajama National Park
- List of mountains in the Andes
