= Jisk'a Kunturiri =

Mountain in Bolivia

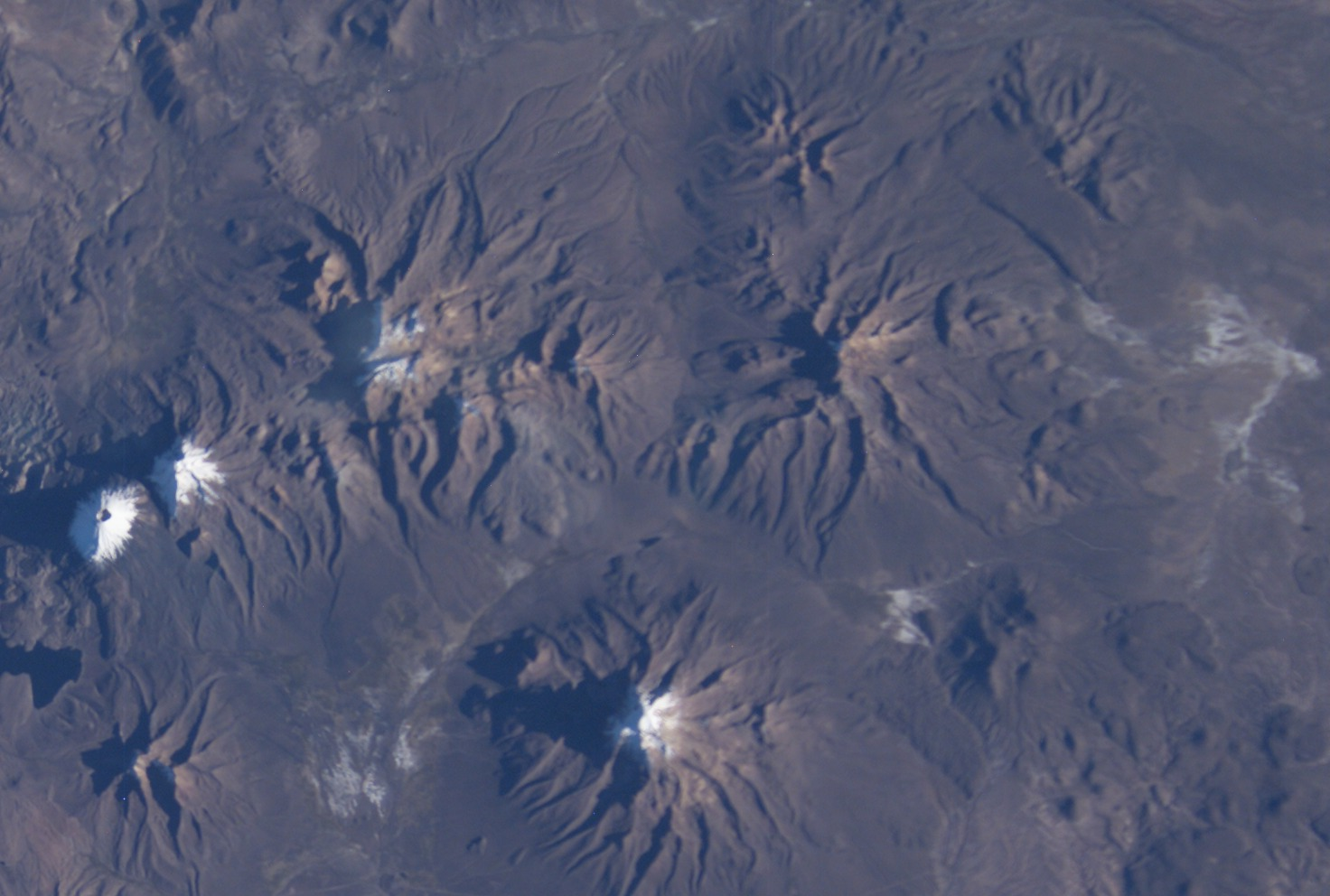
- Jisk'a Kunturiri is located NW of Nevado Sajama (the latter is in the lower center of this NASA image, with north to the top right corner). From left to right there are the snow-covered mountains of Paya Chata, Kunturiri and Jisk'a Kunturiri (a bit below it to the right ).

Highest point
- Elevation: 5,488 m (18,005 ft)
- Prominence: 401 m (1,316 ft)
- Coordinates: 18°2′14″S 69°2′16″W

Geography
- Location within Bolivia
- Location: Bolivia, Oruro Department
- Parent range: Andes

Jisk'a Kunturiri (Aymara jisk'a little, kunturi condor, -ri a suffix, Kunturiri the name of a neighboring mountain, "little Kunturiri", Hispanicized spelling Jiskha Condoriri) is a mountain in the Andes of Bolivia which rises up to 5,488 metres (18,005 ft). It is situated in the Oruro Department, Sajama Province, Curahuara de Carangas Municipality, Sajama Canton, north-west of the extinct Sajama volcano. Kunturi lies south-west of the mountains Jach'a Kunturiri ("big Kunturiri") and Pumuta, north-east of Patilla Pata and the small lake named Ch'iyar Quta and east of the mountain Kunturiri.

The Kunturiri River originates east of the mountain. It flows to the south and then to the east as a tributary of the Sajama River.

== See also ==
- Sajama National Park
- List of mountains in the Andes
