= Qullqi Warani =

Mountain in Bolivia

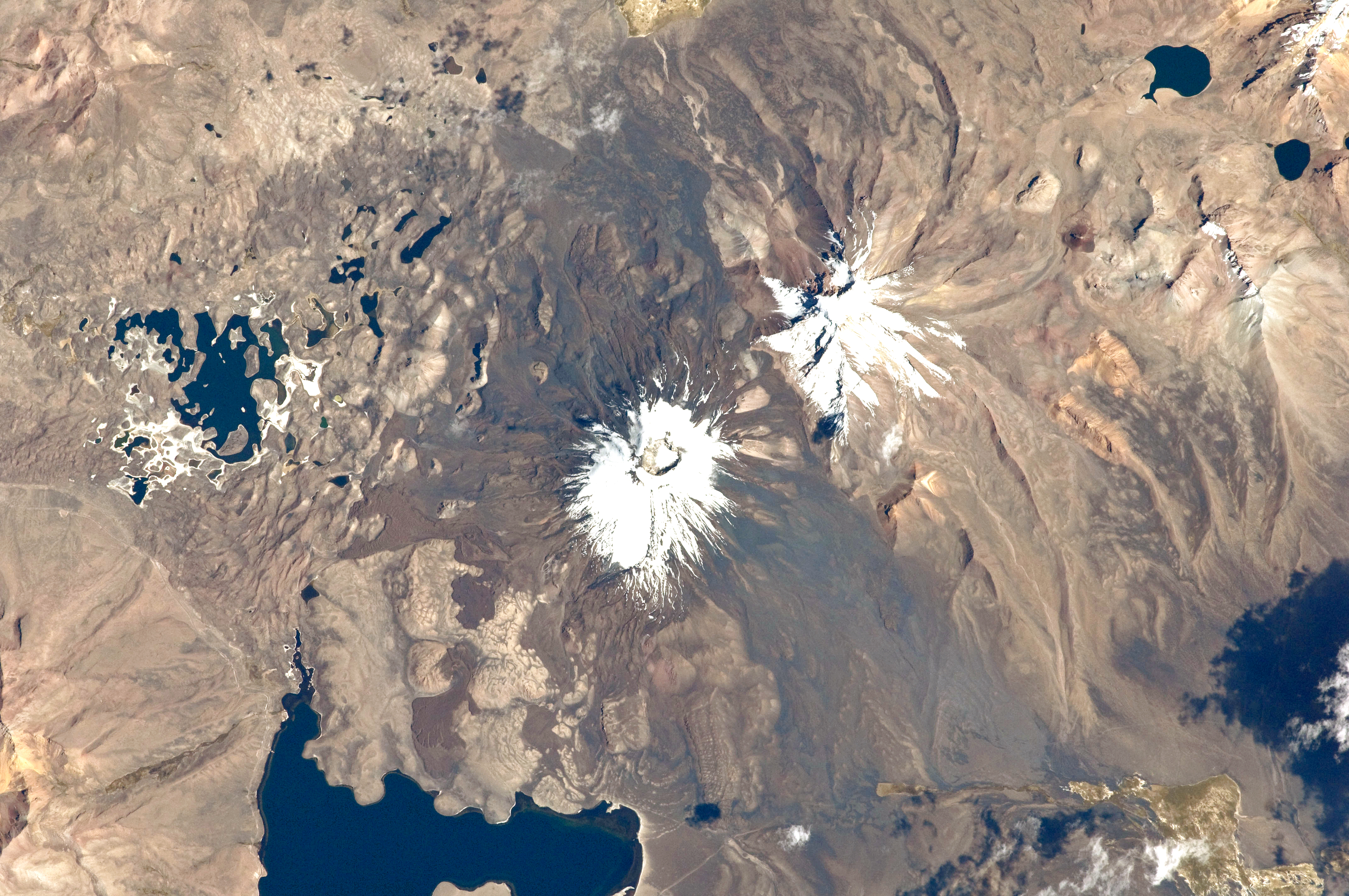
- Satellite image showing the Paya Chata mountains and Qullqi Warani north-east of them (upper right corner east of the small lake Sura Pata, with north to the top right corner)

Highest point
- Coordinates: 18°04′12″S 69°04′05″W

Geography
- Location: Bolivia
- Parent range: Andes

Qullqi Warani (Aymara qullqi silver, also spelled Kollke Huarani) is a mountain in the Oruro Department in Bolivia at the border with Chile, north-west of the extinct Sajama volcano. It is situated in the Sajama Province, in the west of the Curahuara de Carangas Municipality. According to the Bolivian IGM map 1:50,000 'Nevados Payachata Hoja 5739-I' it lies entirely on Bolivian terrain. Qullqi Warani lies south-west of the mountains Jisk'a Kunturiri and Patilla Pata, north of Phaq'u Q'awa and south-east of Kunturiri. The little lakes Q'asiri Quta (Khasiri Kkota) and Sura Pata (Sora Pata, Sorapata) lie at its feet, east and north of it.

The river Junt'uma K'uchu (Aymara junt'u warm, hot, uma water, k'uchu corner, "warm water corner", Junthuma Khuchu) originates south of Qullqi Warani. It flows to the south-east as a right affluent of the Sajama River.
