= Sajama =

Sajama may refer to:

- Nevado Sajama, an extinct stratovolcano and the highest peak in Bolivia
- Sajama National Park, a national park in Bolivia
- Sajama Cut, a rock band from Jakarta, Indonesia
- Sajama Lines, straight paths etched into the ground by the indigenous people living near Nevado Sajama
- Sajama Province, a province in the Oruro Department, Bolivia
