= Phaq'u Q'awa =

Phaq'u Q'awa (Aymara phaq'u, paqu, p'aqu light brown, reddish, fair-haired, dark chestnut, q'awa little river, ditch, crevice, fissure, gap in the earth, "brown brook" or "brown ravine", Hispanicized spellings Paco Cahua, Paco Khaua, Pacocahua, Pacokhaua, Pacojahua, erroneously also Paco Khau, Pajojañua, Patocahua) may refer to:

- Phaq'u Q'awa (La Paz), a mountain in the La Paz Department, Bolivia
- Phaq'u Q'awa (Moquegua-Tacna), a mountain on the border of the Moquegua Region and the Tacna Region, Peru
- Phaq'u Q'awa (Puno), a mountain in the Puno Region, Peru
- Phaq'u Q'awa (Sabaya), a mountain in the Sabaya Province, Oruro Department, Bolivia
- Phaq'u Q'awa (Sajama), a mountain in the Sajama Province, Oruro Department, Bolivia
