= Patilla Pata =

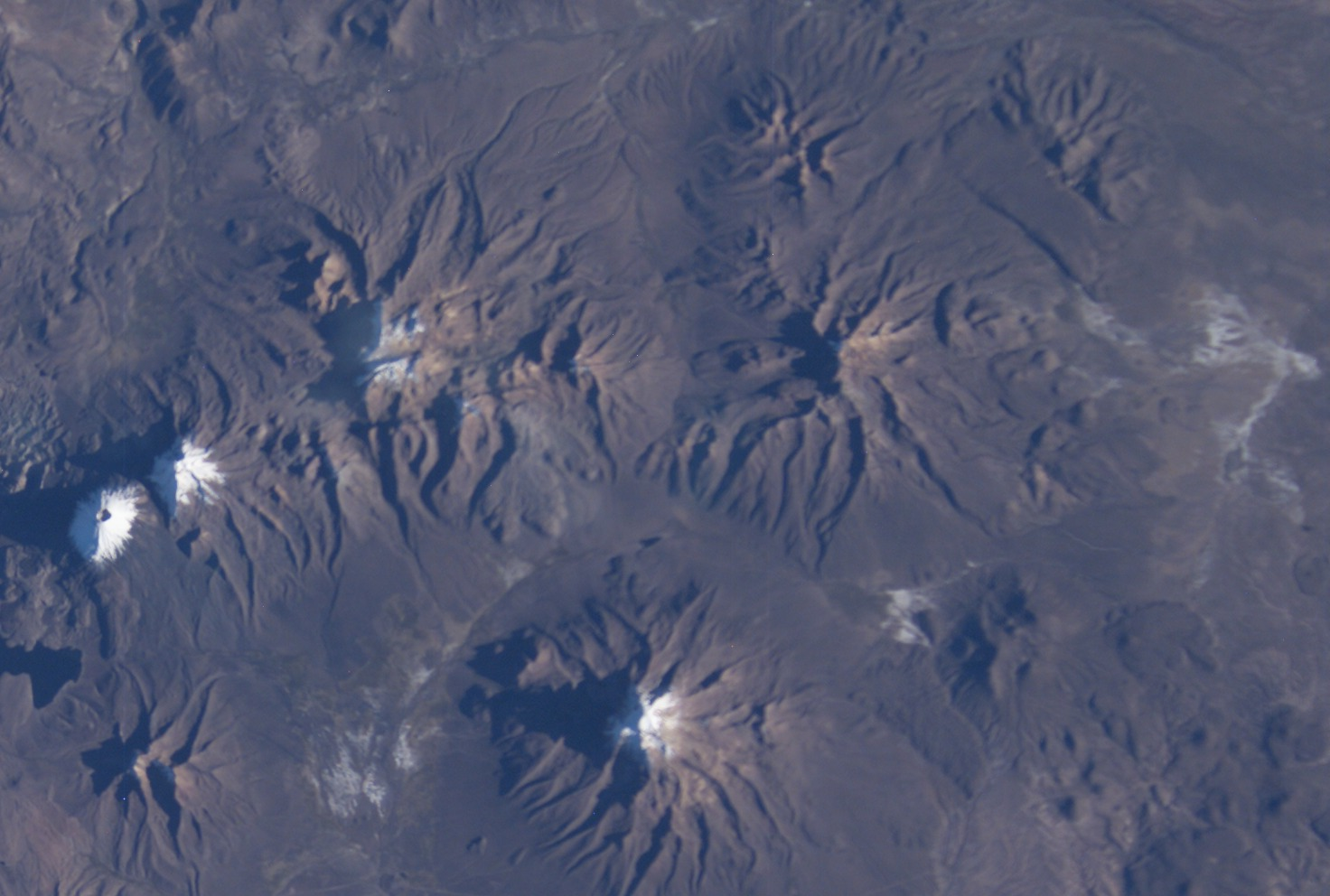
- Patilla Pata is located NW of Nevado Sajama (this latter is in the lower center of this NASA image, with north to the top right corner).

Highest point
- Elevation: 5,324 m (17,467 ft)
- Prominence: 286 m (938 ft)
- Coordinates: 18°03′40″S 69°03′24″W

Geography
- Location: Bolivia
- Parent range: Andes

Geology
- Mountain type: Stratovolcano
- Last eruption: Unknown

Patilla Pata is a stratovolcano in the Oruro Department in Bolivia. It is situated in the Sajama Province, in the west of the Curahuara de Carangas Municipality, at the border with Chile. Patilla Pata lies south-west of the mountain Jisk'a Kunturiri, north-east of the lake Q'asiri Quta (Khasiri Kkota) and the mountain Qullqi Warani, west of the little lake Sura Pata, south-east of the mountains Laram Q'awa, Kunturiri and Milluni and south of the little lake named Ch'iyar Quta.

The river Junt'uma K'uchu (Aymara junt'u warm, hot, uma water, k'uchu corner, "warm water corner", Junthuma Khuchu) originates south of Patilla Pata. It flows to the south-east as a right affluent of the Sajama River.

The date of its last eruption is unclear, but it is unlikely to be during the Holocene as the mountain is heavily glaciated. The composition of the volcano is largely andesitic, but there are also a number of basaltic lava flows.

== See also ==
- Jach'a Kunturiri
- Sajama
- List of volcanoes in Bolivia

== Sources ==
- "Patilla Pata". Global Volcanism Program. Smithsonian Institution.
