= Curahuara de Carangas =

- Town
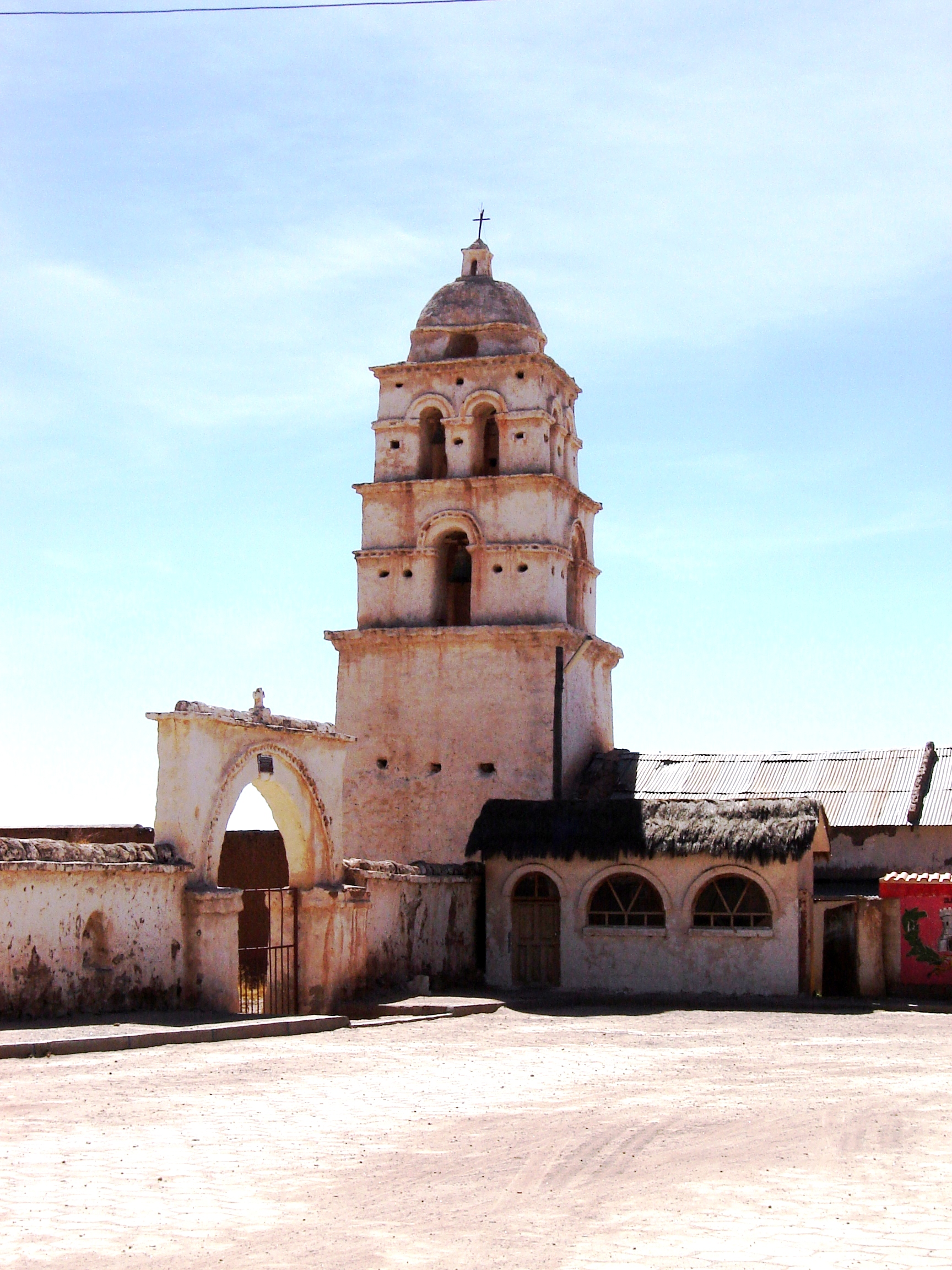
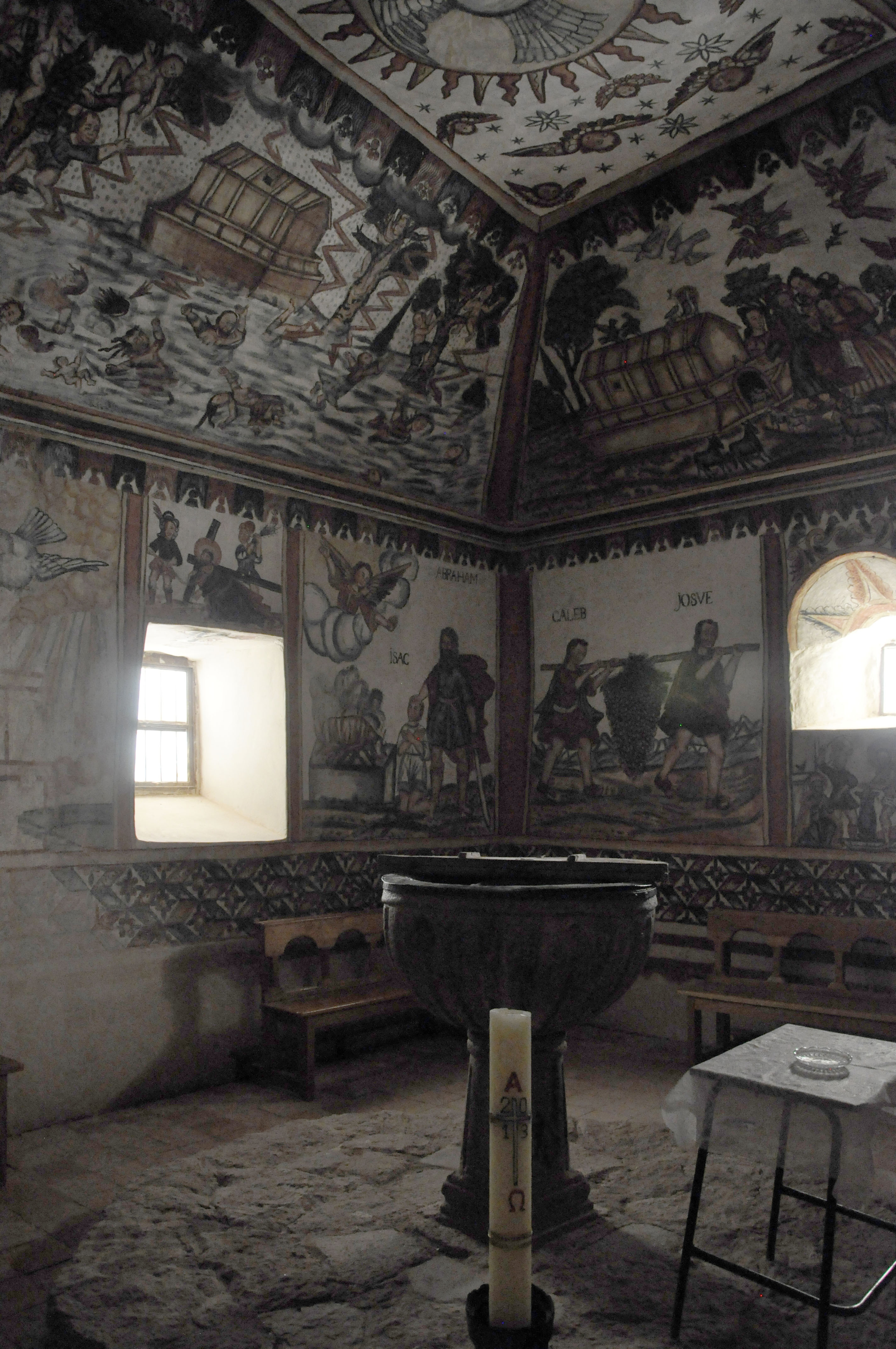
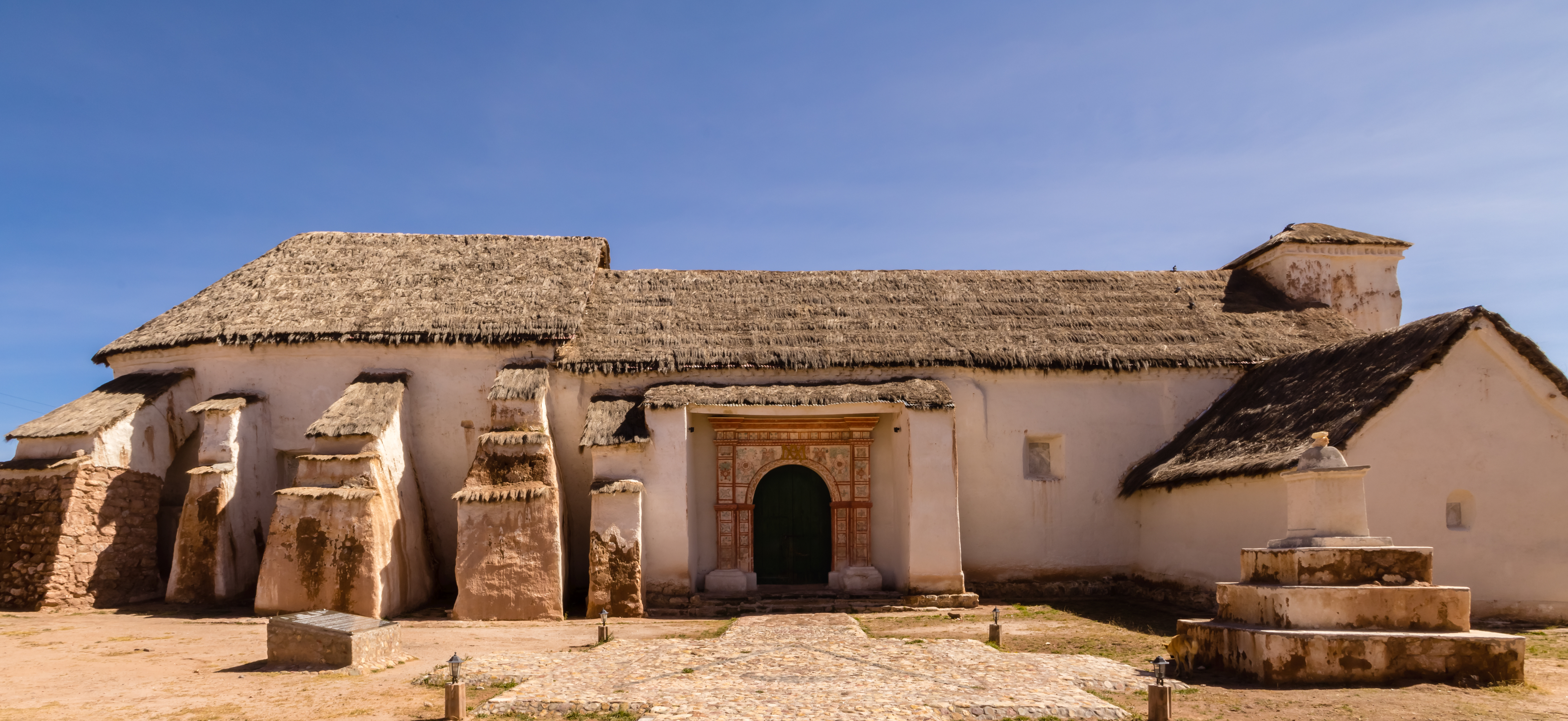
- Church of Curahuara de Carangas

- Location within Bolivia
- Coordinates: 17°52′S 68°26′W
- Country: Bolivia
- Department: Oruro Department
- Province: Sajama Province
- Municipality: Curahuara de Carangas Municipality
- Canton: Curahuara de Carangas Canton
- Elevation: 12,841 ft (3,914 m)

Population (2012)
  - Total: 4,184
- Time zone: UTC-4 (BOT)

Curahuara de Carangas is a small town in the Bolivian Oruro Department. It is the seat of the Sajama Province. In 2009 it had an estimated population of 1,581.

== Church ==
The town's adobe church, nicknamed the "Andean Sistine Chapel", is known for murals that combine biblical scenes with Indigenous religious symbols. In November 2026, a restoration project was replacing the thatched roof and whitewashing the walls, with work scheduled to finish in mid-December.

== Climate ==
Climate data for Cosapa, elevation 3,922 m (12,867 ft), (1977–2013)
Month	Jan	Feb	Mar	Apr	May	Jun	Jul	Aug	Sep	Oct	Nov	Dec	Year
Record high °C (°F)	26.0 (78.8)	24.5 (76.1)	28.3 (82.9)	25.5 (77.9)	25.0 (77.0)	21.5 (70.7)	22.8 (73.0)	24.6 (76.3)	23.2 (73.8)	23.8 (74.8)	26.6 (79.9)	25.5 (77.9)	28.3 (82.9)
Mean daily maximum °C (°F)	17.6 (63.7)	17.3 (63.1)	17.7 (63.9)	17.9 (64.2)	17.4 (63.3)	16.3 (61.3)	16.3 (61.3)	16.6 (61.9)	18.0 (64.4)	18.2 (64.8)	19.2 (66.6)	18.7 (65.7)	17.6 (63.7)
Daily mean °C (°F)	10.1 (50.2)	9.5 (49.1)	8.3 (46.9)	6.9 (44.4)	5.8 (42.4)	4.4 (39.9)	3.6 (38.5)	4.1 (39.4)	5.2 (41.4)	6.9 (44.4)	8.3 (46.9)	8.8 (47.8)	6.8 (44.3)
Mean daily minimum °C (°F)	2.7 (36.9)	2.2 (36.0)	−1.1 (30.0)	−3.9 (25.0)	−5.7 (21.7)	−7.5 (18.5)	−9.1 (15.6)	−8.4 (16.9)	−7.7 (18.1)	−4.4 (24.1)	−2.6 (27.3)	−1.2 (29.8)	−3.9 (25.0)
Record low °C (°F)	−8.5 (16.7)	−9.2 (15.4)	−14.1 (6.6)	−10.1 (13.8)	−15.4 (4.3)	−18.9 (−2.0)	−16.7 (1.9)	−16.3 (2.7)	−16.3 (2.7)	−16.3 (2.7)	−11.0 (12.2)	−9.8 (14.4)	−18.9 (−2.0)
Average precipitation mm (inches)	120.3 (4.74)	94.7 (3.73)	61.6 (2.43)	5.4 (0.21)	2.7 (0.11)	1.5 (0.06)	1.5 (0.06)	2.3 (0.09)	8.0 (0.31)	6.0 (0.24)	14.9 (0.59)	55.6 (2.19)	374.5 (14.76)
Average precipitation days	16.2	12.9	10.6	2.1	0.4	0.5	0.3	0.8	1.2	2.0	4.0	8.6	59.6
Source: Servicio Nacional de Meteorología e Hidrología de Bolivia

== See also ==
- Ch'iyar Quta
- Sajama
- Sajama National Park
