= Phaq'u Q'awa (La Paz) =

Mountain in Bolivia

- Location within Bolivia

Highest point
- Elevation: 5,252 m (17,231 ft)
- Coordinates: 18°01′29″S 69°07′05″W

Geography
- Location: Bolivia
- Parent range: Andes

Phaq'u Q'awa is a mountain in the Andes of Bolivia, with an elevation of 5,252 metres (17,231 ft). It is located in the Charaña Municipality of the La Paz Department, near the border with Chile. The mountain lies northwest of Kunturiri and southeast of Laram Q'awa. The nearest peak to the east is Jaruma, an Aymara name meaning "bitter water". One of three rivers in the area originates north of Phaq'u Q'awa and flows in a curve along the northern slopes of Laram Q'awa toward Chile.

== Etymology ==
The name Phaq'u Q'awa comes from the Aymara words phaq'u, paqu, or p'aqu, meaning light brown, reddish, fair-haired, or dark chestnut, and q'awa, meaning little river, ditch, crevice, fissure, or gap in the earth. The name can be translated as "brown brook" or "brown ravine". Hispanicized spellings include Pacocahua and Pajojañua.

== See also ==
- Jach'a Kunturiri
- Sajama National Park
