= Ch'iyar Quta (Oruro) =

Small Bolivian lake

- Location within Bolivia Location within South America
- Interactive map of Ch'iyar Quta
- Location: Bolivia, Oruro Department, Sajama Province
- Coordinates: 18°02′59″S 69°03′03″W
- Surface elevation: 5,090 m (16,700 ft)

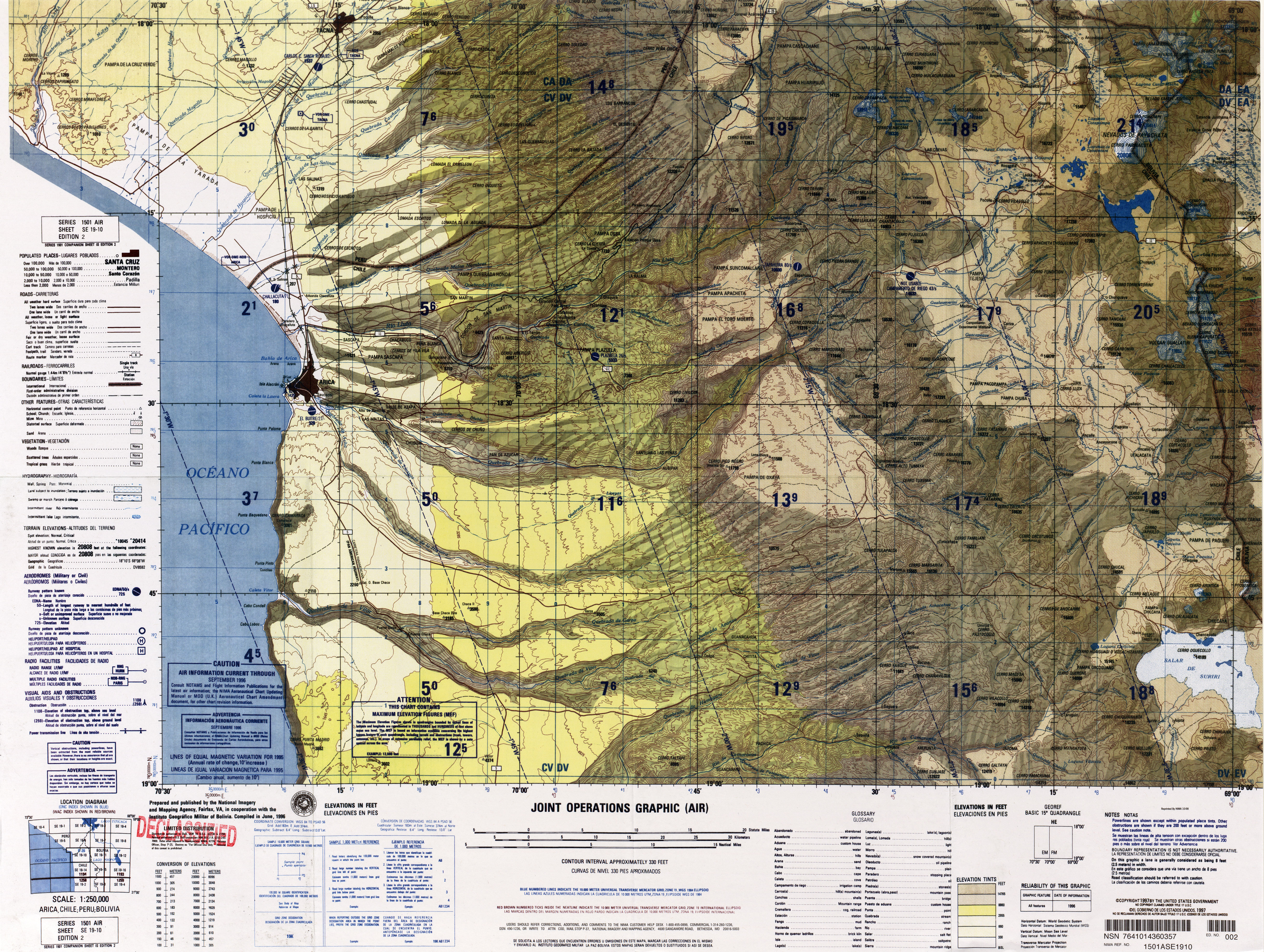
Area topographic map.

Ch'iyar Quta (Aymara ch'iyara black, quta lake, "black lake", hispanicized spellings Chiar Kkota and erroneously also Chiar Kkola) is a small Bolivian lake located in the Sajama Province of the Oruro Department near the border to Chile. It is situated at a height of about 5,090 meters (16,700 feet) inside the boundaries of the Sajama National Park. Ch'iyar Quta lies south-east of the peaks of Laram Q'awa, Milluni and Kunturiri, south-west of Jisk'a Kunturiri and north of Patilla Pata.

== See also ==
- Jach'a Kunturiri
