= Laram Q'awa (Charaña) =

Mountain in Bolivia

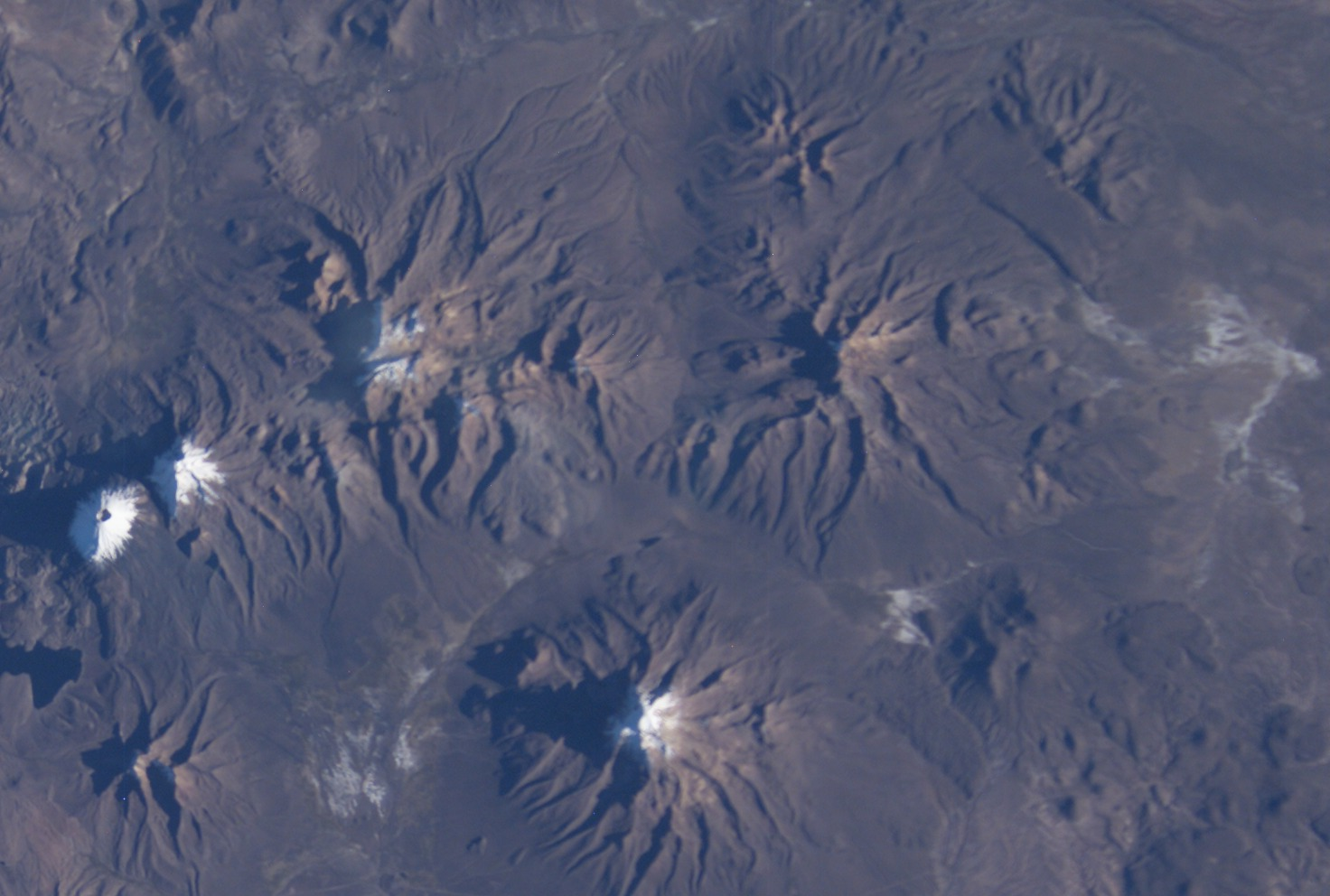
- Parinacota, K'isi K'isini, Pomerape, Laram Q'awa, Patilla Pata and Sajama (l-r) as seen from NASA space shuttle

Highest point
- Elevation: 5,182 m (17,001 ft)
- Prominence: 93 m (305 ft)
- Coordinates: 18°01′09″S 69°08′33″W

Geography
- Location within Bolivia
- Location: Bolivia
- Parent range: Andes

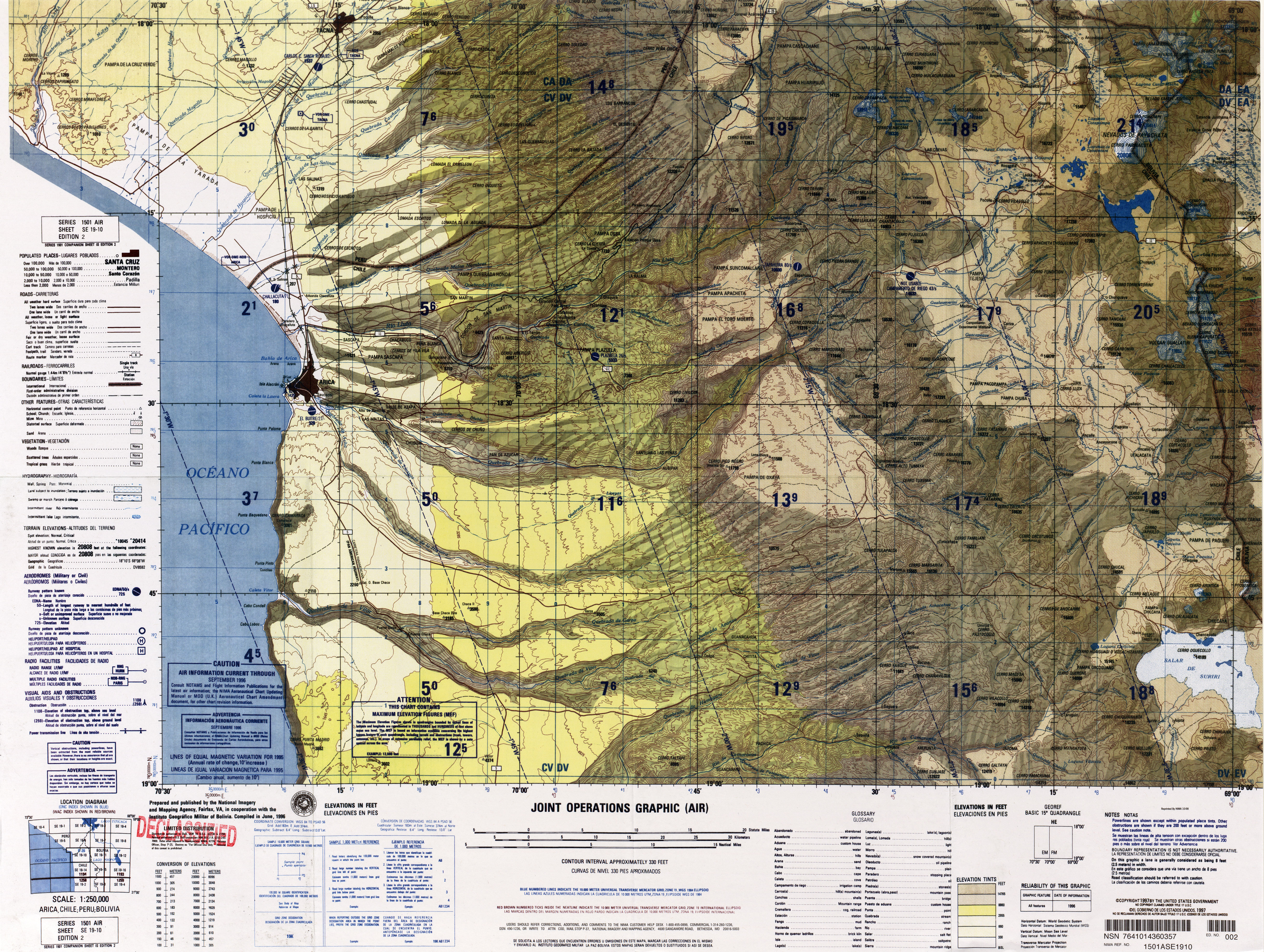
Map showing Laram Q'awa (Laram Khaua) on the border with Chile

Laram Q'awa (Aymara larama blue, q'awa little river, ditch, crevice, fissure, gap in the earth, "blue brook" or "blue ravine", Hispanicized spellings Laram Khaua, Larancagua) is a 5,182-metre-high (17,001 ft) mountain in the Andes. According to the Bolivian IGM map 1:50,000 'Nevados Payachata Hoja 5739-I' it is situated on Bolivian terrain in the La Paz Department, Pacajes Province (Charaña Municipality), at the border with Chile. It lies north-west of the mountains Kunturiri, Phaq'u Q'awa and another mountain on the border named Laram Q'awa (Laram Khaua). One of three different rivers of this area called Kunturiri (Condoriri) originates north-east of the mountain near Phaq'u Q'awa. It flows in a bow along the northern slopes of Laram Q'awa towards Chile.

== See also ==
- Jach'a Kunturiri
- Sajama National Park
