= Llisa =

Mountain in Bolivia

Lisa
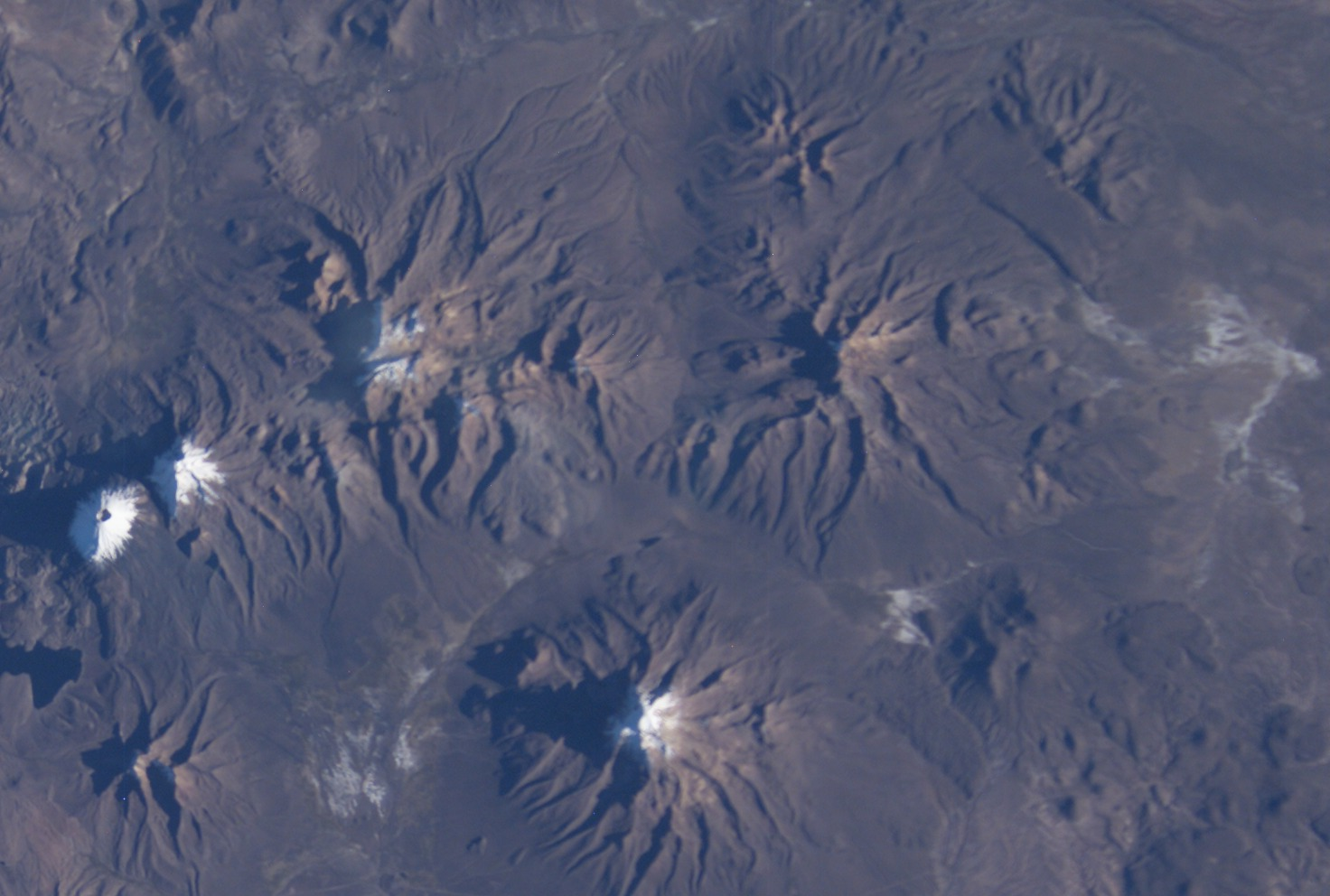
- Llisa is visible in the lower right part of this satellite image (center, right). Sajama volcano is shown in the lower center.

Highest point
- Elevation: 4,708 m (15,446 ft)
- Coordinates: 17°58′55″S 68°46′07″W

Geography
- Location within Bolivia
- Location: Bolivia, Oruro Department, Sajama Province
- Parent range: Andes

Llisa (Aymara for a variety of quartz, also for a stone with a special shape used to shear llamas) is a 4,708-metre-high (15,446 ft) mountain in the Andes of Bolivia. It is located in the Oruro Department, Sajama Province, Curahuara de Carangas Municipality. Llisa lies northeast of the Sajama volcano.
