= Waña Quta (Oruro) =

Lake in Bolivia

- Location within Bolivia Location within South America
- Interactive map of Waña Quta
- Location: Bolivia; Oruro Department, Sajama Province
- Coordinates: 18°02′29″S 68°55′59″W
- Surface elevation: 4,350 m (14,270 ft)

Waña Quta (Aymara waña dry, quta lake, "dry lake", hispanicized spellings Huañakota, Huaña Kota, Huaña Khota, Huaña Kkota, Huayñakota, Huaña Q'ota) is a small lake in Bolivia located in the Oruro Department, Sajama Province. It is in the Sajama National Park northwest of the Sajama volcano at a height of about 4,350 metres (14,270 ft).

The lake is a place to discover birds like Andean avocet, Andean lapwing, cattle egret, horned coot, Puna teal, ruddy duck and yellow-billed pintail.
