= Phaq'u Q'awa (Sajama) =

Mountain in Bolivia

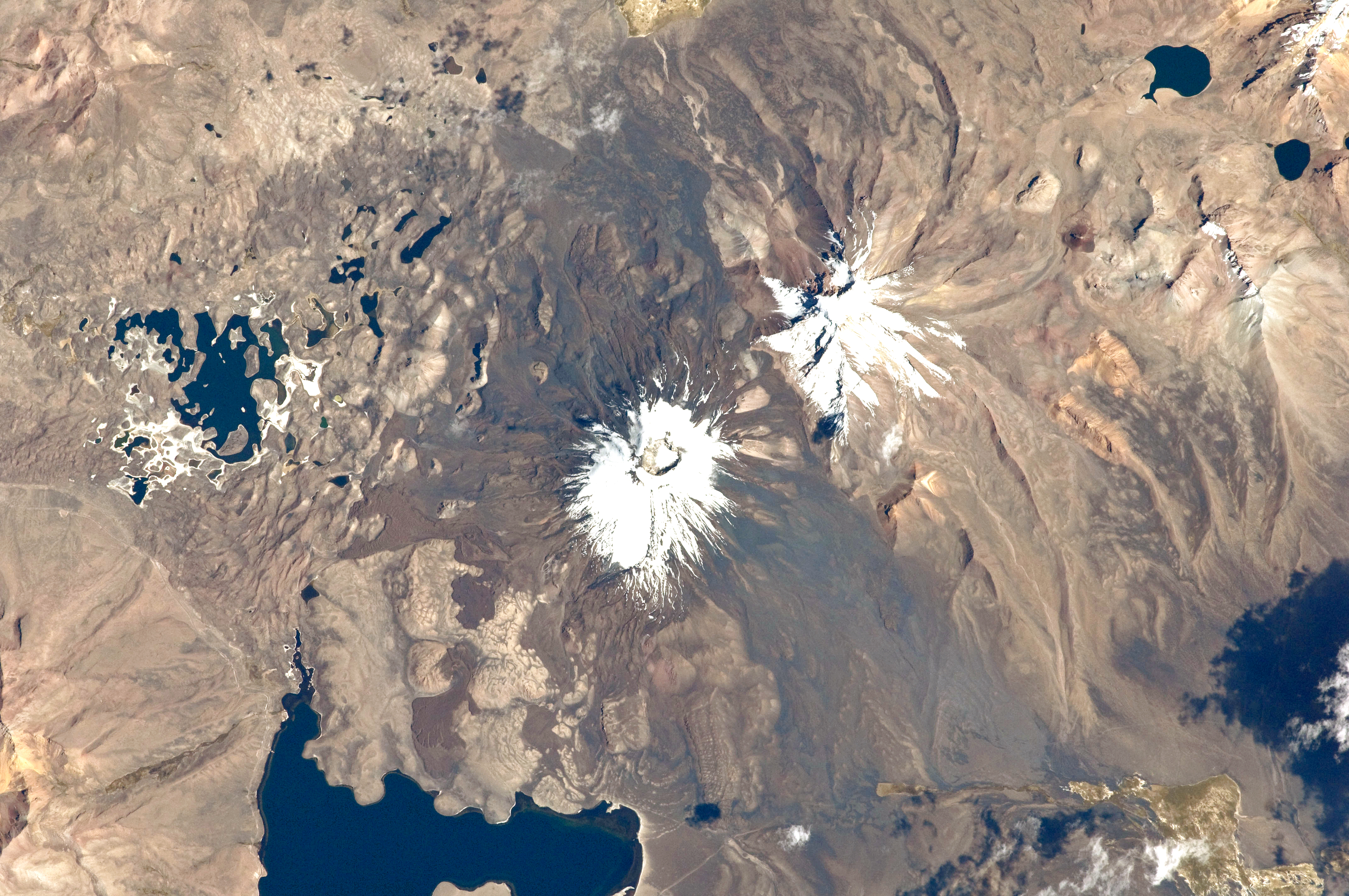
- Satellite image showing the Paya Chata mountains and Phaq'u Q'awa northeast of them (upper right corner below the smaller lake, with north to the top right corner)

Highest point
- Elevation: 5,380 m (17,650 ft)
- Coordinates: 18°05′30″S 69°04′08″W

Geography
- Location within Bolivia
- Location: Bolivia
- Parent range: Andes, Cordillera Occidental

Phaq'u Q'awa is a mountain in the Cordillera Occidental in the Andes of Bolivia, about 5,380 metres (17,651 ft) high. It is situated in the Oruro Department, Sajama Province, in the west of the Curahuara de Carangas Municipality, northwest of the extinct Sajama volcano. It lies south of Qullqi Warani.

The river Junt'uma K'uchu (Aymara junt'u warm, hot, uma water, k'uchu corner, "warm water corner", Junthuma Khuchu) originates north of Phaq'u Q'awa. It flows to the southeast as a right affluent of the Sajama River.

== Name ==
Phaq'u Q'awa derives from Aymara language terms phaq'u, paqu, or p'aqu meaning the color light brown, reddish, fair-haired, or dark chestnut, and q'awa meaning little river, ditch, crevice, fissure, or gap in the earth, the name thus meaning "brown brook" or "brown ravine". The Hispanicized spelling is Pacocahua or Pajojañua.
