= Jach'a Kunturiri (Oruro) =

Mountain in Bolivia

- Location within Bolivia

Highest point
- Elevation: 5,326 m (17,474 ft)
- Coordinates: 17°59′55″S 69°00′20″W

Geography
- Location: Bolivia, Oruro Department
- Parent range: Andes

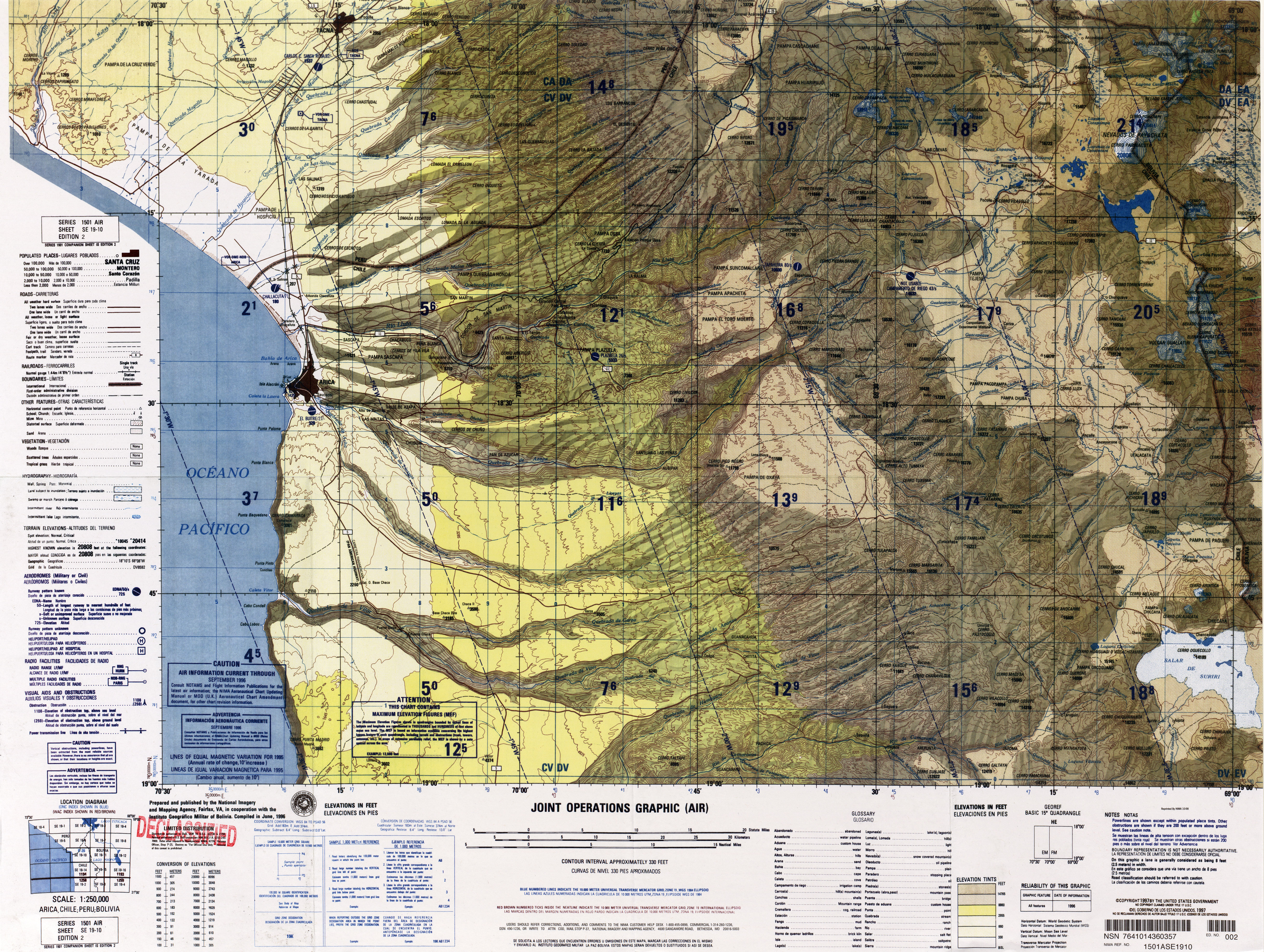
Map showing the location of Jach'a Kunturiri north-east of Kunturiri

Jach'a Kunturiri (Aymara jach'a big, kunturi condor, -ri a suffix, Hispanicized spelling Jachcha Condoriri) is a 5,326-metre-high (17,474 ft) mountain in the Andes of Bolivia. It is situated in the Oruro Department, Sajama Province, Curahuara de Carangas Municipality, Sajama Canton, near the border to the La Paz Department. Jach'a Kunturi lies north-east of the mountains Kunturiri and Jisk'a Kunturiri and north-west of the extinct Sajama volcano.

== See also ==
- Ch'iyar Quta
- Laram Q'awa
- Sajama National Park
- List of mountains in the Andes
