= Sajama Lines =

Network of manmade lines in Bolivia

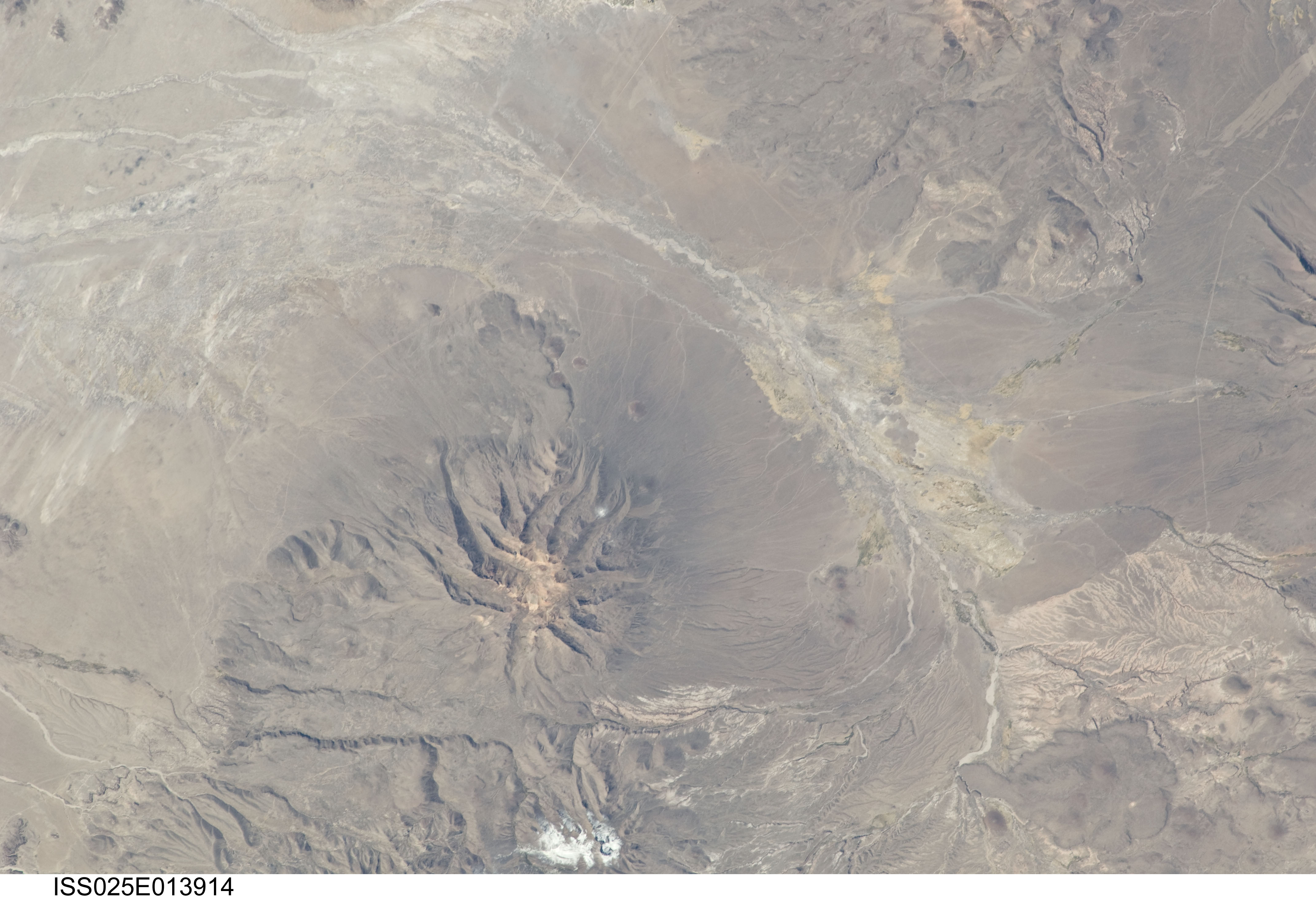
Aerial photo of some of the lines (taken from the International Space Station)

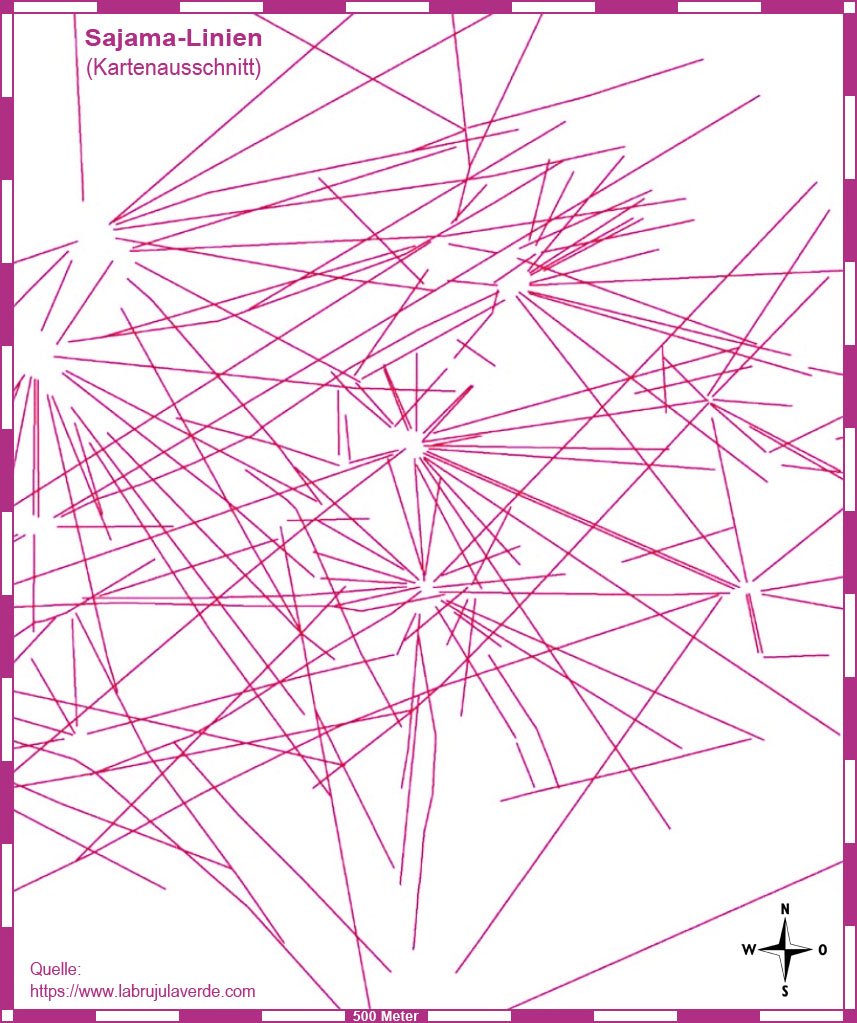
Map of the Sajama Lines

The Sajama Lines [saˈxama] of western Bolivia are a network of thousands (possibly tens of thousands) of nearly perfectly straight paths etched into the ground continuously for more than 3,000 years by the indigenous people living near the volcano Sajama. They form a web-like network that blankets the Altiplano.

== Characteristics ==
Recent research revealed that this network of lines covers an area of 22,525 km^{2} (8,697 sq mi; 5,566,000 acres), approximately fifteen times larger than the area covered by the Nazca Lines in Peru. Rough estimates put their linear length at approximately 16,000 kilometres (9,900 mi), roughly three times the breadth of the United States. As such, the Sajama Lines are the largest archaeological site in the Andes and might be considered the largest artwork in the world.

The lines were created by scraping aside vegetation and the dark surface material consisting of soil and oxidized rock and exposing the lighter subsurface material. Like the better-known Nazca Lines (which differ from the Sajama Lines in that some of the Nazca are depictions of animals) neither the purpose of these lines, nor how the makers achieved such precision, are completely understood.

Scholars at the University of Pennsylvania describe:

While many of these sacred lines extend as far as ten or twenty kilometers (and perhaps further), they all seem to maintain a remarkable straightness despite rugged topography and natural obstacles. The sheer number and length of these lines is often difficult to perceive from ground level, but from the air or hilltop vantage points, they are stunning.

Many believe that the lines were originally used by indigenous people when they made sacred pilgrimages. Interspersed among this network of radial lines and aligned to where lines meet are wak'as (shrines), chullpas (burial towers) and hamlets, making the area a unique cultural landscape. Though the region is now sparsely populated there is evidence that some of the lines are still in use as footpaths.

== Analysis and preservation ==
The earliest account of the Sajama Lines in English is a brief reference by traveler Aimé Felix Tschiffely in 1932. That same decade, anthropologist Alfred Metraux brought the lines and associated structures to the attention of scholars when he published ethnographic fieldwork about the Aymara and Chipaya people of the Carangas region.

In the 1970s, British writer and filmmaker Tony Morrison reported on this network of sacred lines and roadways. In recent years, organizations such as the Landmarks Foundation have studied and mapped the Sajama Lines to create a database to help protect the landscape from threats of erosion, unchecked internationally financed development and tourism in the area, and other dangers that come from the absence of a management plan.

The Landmarks Foundation worked with the University of Pennsylvania to develop the "Tierra Sajama project" which used geographic information systems (GIS) and other analytic digital media tools to map, describe, and analyze the Sajama Lines and their associated structures in order to offer strategies to protect and promote the Lines in the future. The Tierra Sajama project:

- Created a computer-database of maps and pertinent information about the lines, local vegetation, and relevant topography
- Analyzed and interpreted the patterns and meanings of various land features such as mountaintop shrines and religious structures to determine possible alignments to the sacred Lines
- Developed proposals that provided for long-term protection of the Lines and enhanced appreciation of the sacred landscape

According to Tierra Sajama participants:

The Sajama Lines are extraordinary examples of human achievement and spiritual expression. With proper preservation and management, responsible development, erosion prevention and measures to minimize vandalism the Sajama Lines can be protected to the benefit of tourists from all over the world as well as the local people.

== Select bibliography ==
- Aveni, Anthony. Between the Lines: The Mystery of the Giant Ground Drawings of Ancient Nasca, Peru. Austin, Texas: University of Texas Press, 2000
- Bauer, Brian. The Sacred Landscape of the Inca: The Cusco Ceque System. University of Texas Press, Austin, 1998.

== See also ==
- Coordinates: 18°16′08″S 68°42′18″W (Geohack satellite sample area)
