= Kunturiri (Bolivia and Chile) =

South American volcano

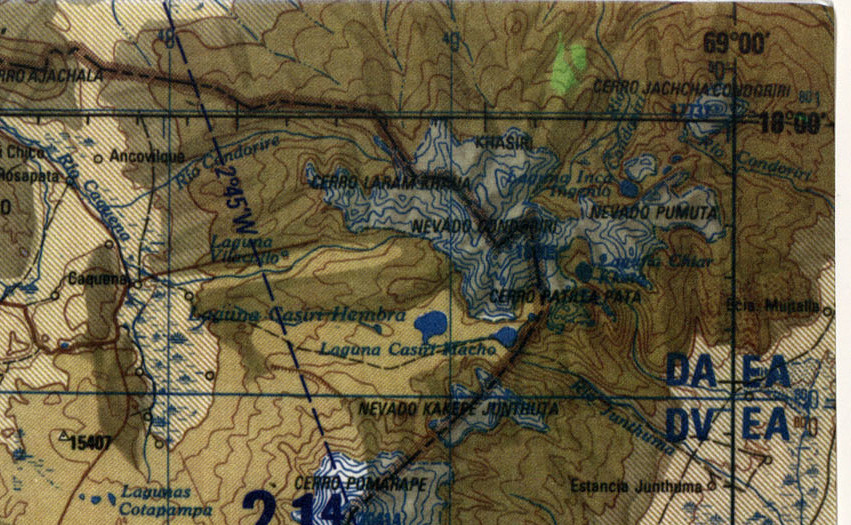
- Map of the Kunturiri complex

Highest point
- Elevation: 5,762 m (18,904 ft)
- Coordinates: 18°2′30″S 69°4′28″W

Geography
- Location within Bolivia
- Location: Bolivia / Chile
- Parent range: Andes

Geology
- Rock age: 650,000 ± 70,000 years

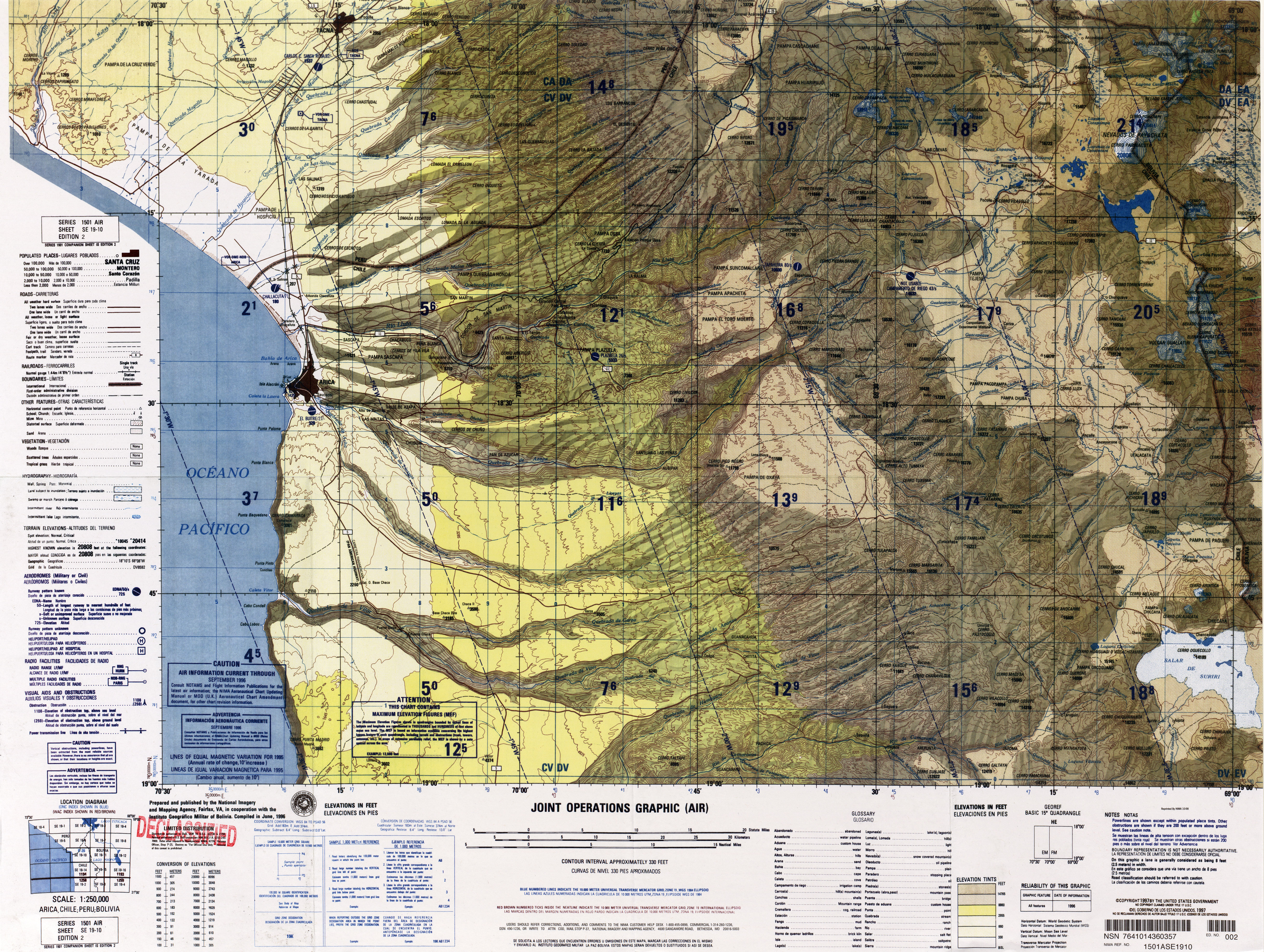
Map showing the location of Kunturiri south-west of Jach'a Kunturiri

Kunturiri (Aymara kunturi condor, -ri a suffix, Hispanicized spelling Condoriri) is a volcano in the Andes on the border of Bolivia and Chile which rises up to 5,762 metres (18,904 ft). On the Chilean side it is located in the Arica and Parinacota Region and on the Bolivian side in the Oruro Department, Sajama Province, Curahuara de Carangas Municipality, Sajama Canton as well as in the La Paz Department, Pacajes Province, Calacoto Municipality, Ulloma Canton.

Northeast of it in Bolivian territory lies Jach'a Kunturiri, due east lies Nevado Pumuta, due south Patilla Pata and northwest lies Laram Q'awa. The mountain is covered by ice along with some of the surrounding mountains and is the source of a number of rivers that flow down its slopes. There are several lakes on the mountain, colloquially known as the Casiri Lakes; they include Sora Pata, Ch'iyar Quta, Casiri Macho and Casiri Hembra.

Kunturiri is part of a complex of volcanoes along the frontier between Bolivia and Chile, which have developed atop older ignimbrites of unknown thickness. Three separate stratovolcanoes generated through both effusive eruptions and explosive eruptions make up the Kunturiri complex and produced lava flows with lengths reaching 8 kilometres (5.0 mi). It is formed by rocks ranging from rhyodacite to rhyolite and which contain phenocrysts of biotite, plagioclase and pyroxene.

The Kunturiri volcanic complex 3-2.2 million years ago was the origin of the large Lauca-Perez Ignimbrite, which covered about 15,000–20,000 square kilometres (5,800–7,700 sq mi) of land with over 775 cubic kilometres (186 cu mi) and reached as far as the Pacific Ocean, leaving a distinctive landscape on the Altiplano. The eruption left a caldera now presumably buried underneath the Kunturiri volcanic complex. While the volcanic complex was once considered to be 7-9 million years old, later efforts have found younger ages and argon-argon dating has yielded ages of 413,000 ± 5,000 and 650,000 ± 70,000 years ago for rocks erupted from the Kunturiri volcanic complex; there is no fumarolic activity at Kunturiri, but Kakepe has hydrothermal activity. Glacial erosion and hydrothermal alteration have affected the complex.

Other volcanoes in the area are Pomerape and Parinacota which are constructed on the so-called Condoriri lineament together with Kunturiri; this lineament may act as a magma pathway to the three volcanoes.

== See also ==
- Kunturiri (Los Andes)
- List of mountains in the Andes
- Sajama National Park
