= Nevado Sajama =

Extinct volcano in Bolivia

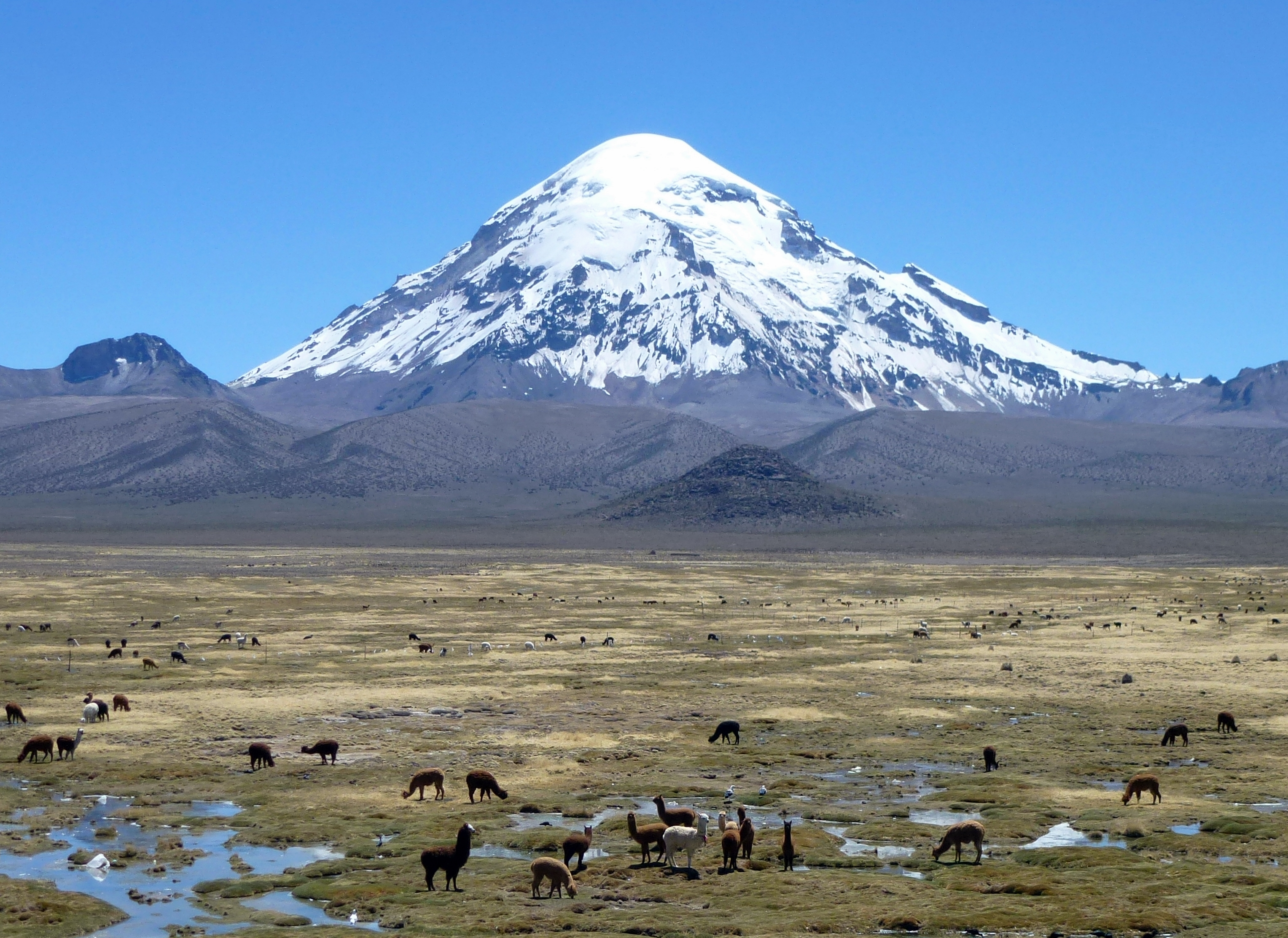

Highest point
- Elevation: 6,542 m (21,463 ft)
- Listing: Country high point Ultra
- Coordinates: 18°06′29″S 68°52′59″W

Naming
- Etymology: Aymara chak xaña, "west"
- Native name: Chak Xaña (Aymara)

Geography
- Location within Bolivia
- Country: Bolivia
- Department: Oruro Department
- Parent range: Cordillera Occidental (Andes)

Nevado Sajama ([neˈβaðo saˈxama]; Aymara: Chak Xaña) is an extinct volcano and the highest peak in Bolivia. The mountain is located in Sajama Province, in Oruro Department. It is situated in Sajama National Park and is a composite volcano consisting of a stratovolcano on top of several lava domes. It is not clear when it erupted last but it may have been during the Pleistocene or Holocene.

The mountain is covered by an ice cap, and Polylepis tarapacana trees occur up to 5,000 metres (16,000 ft) elevation.

== Toponymy ==
The name Sajama comes from the Aymara words chak-jjaña and means "to the west."

== Geography and geomorphology ==
Nevado Sajama is located in the Sajama Province of the Oruro Department in Bolivia, about 18.6 kilometres (11.6 mi) from the border with Chile. Cholcani volcano lies southeast of Sajama, and another neighbouring volcano, Pomerape, resembles Sajama in its appearance. A road runs along the southeastern flank of the volcano, with additional roads completing a circle around Sajama. The village of Sajama lies on its western foot, with the village of Caripe to the northeast of the mountain and Lagunas to the southwest, and there are a number of farms.

In Bolivia, the Andes mountain chain splits into two branches separated by a 3,500–4,000 metres (11,500–13,100 ft) high plateau, the Altiplano. Nevado Sajama lies in the Western Andes of Bolivia and in the western side of the Altiplano; more specifically the mountain is located before the Western Cordillera.

Nevado Sajama rises about 2.2 kilometres (1.4 mi) from the surrounding terrain to a height of 6,542 metres (21,463 ft) (earlier estimates of its height are 6,572 metres (21,562 ft)), making it the highest mountain of Bolivia. Below 4,200 metres (13,800 ft) the mountain is characterized by parasitic vents and a cover of lava fragments and volcanic ash. Two secondary summits 5,031 metres (16,506 ft) and 5,161 metres (16,932 ft) occur west and east-northeast from Sajama respectively; the former is named Cerro Huisalla and the second is Huayna Potosi. The mountain has a conical shape and is capped by a summit crater that, owing to its ice fill, appears to be linked to the flat summit plateau of Sajama but other records do not indicate the presence of a crater. The Patokho, Huaqui Jihuata and Phajokhoni valleys are located on the eastern flank; at lower elevations the whole volcano features glacially deepened valleys.

The terrain is characterized by a continuous ice cover in the central sector of the mountain, exposures of bedrock, deposits and rock glaciers in some sites, alluvial fans and scree in the periphery of Sajama and moraines forming a girdle around the upper sector of Sajama. The moraines occur mainly on the lower slopes of the mountain where the glaciers split up, and the former glaciation left more traces on the southern side of the mountain. The ground moraines are the most prominent moraines on Sajama, and have varying colours depending on the source of their component rocks. Vegetation and small lakes occur in their proximity, while other parts are unvegetated. They mostly occur within glacial valleys, but some appear to have formed underneath small plateau ice caps on flatter terrain. At lower elevations the glaciers lead to lava flows and matorral and tolar vegetation, and finally to grassland at lower altitudes.

A number of wetlands called bofedales occur on the mountain. Starting in the lake Waña Quta on the northwestern foot of Sajama, the Tomarapi River flows first northeastward, then east, south and southeast around the northern and eastern flanks of the volcano; the Sicuyani River, which originates on Sajama, joins it there. The southern flanks give rise to the Huaythana River, which flows directly south and then makes a sharp turn to the east. The Sajama River originates on the western side of the volcano, flowing due south and increasingly turning southeast before joining the Lauca River. The other rivers draining Sajama and its ice cap also eventually join the Lauca River and end in the Salar de Coipasa.

== Geology ==
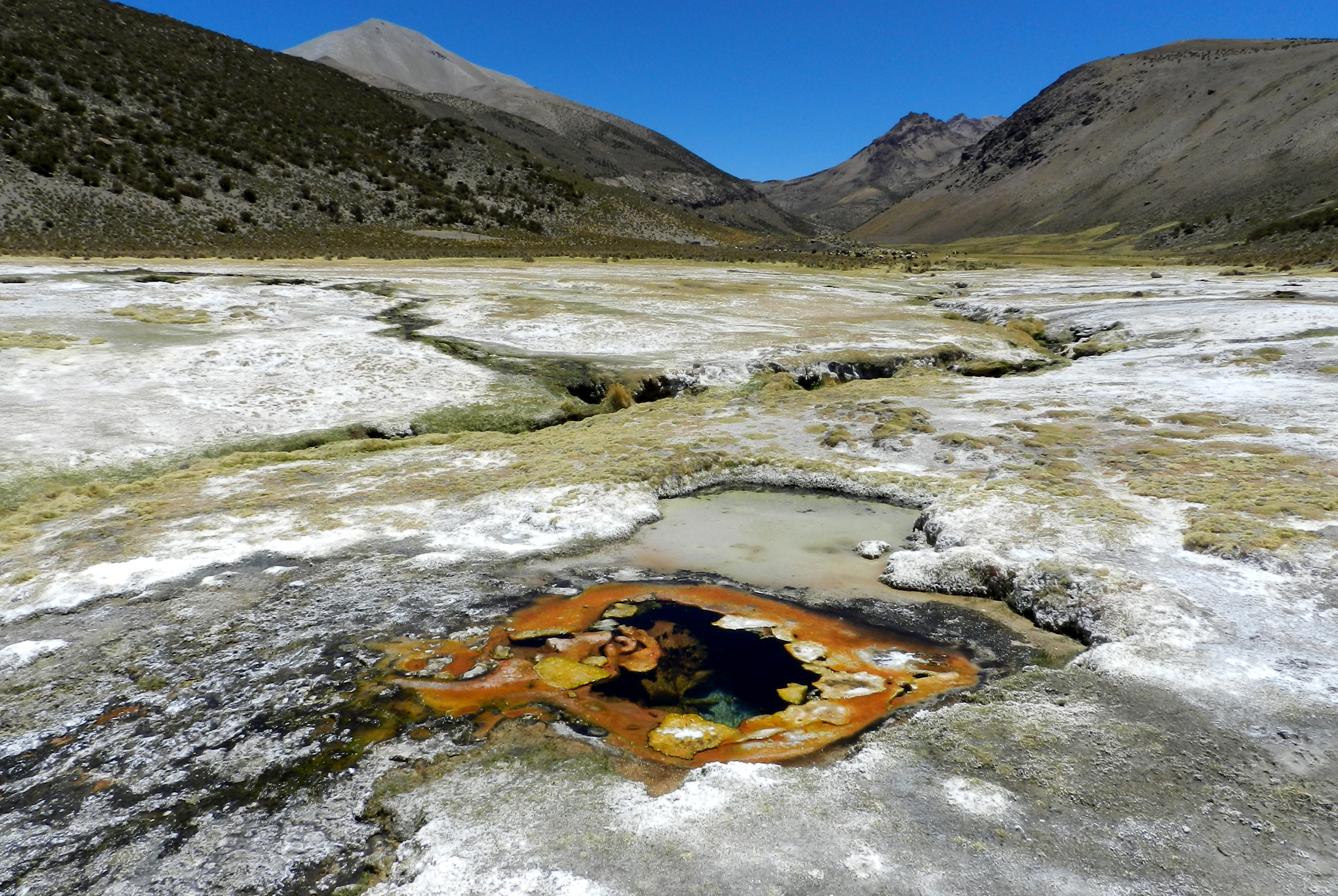
Hot springs on the Junthuma River

Nevado Sajama is part of the Central Volcanic Zone of the Andes, where volcanism is triggered by the subduction of the Nazca Plate beneath the South America Plate. Changes in the subduction regime took place during the Oligocene and directed an increase of volcanic activity in the region. Volcanoes in the region have ages ranging from Pleistocene to Miocene and grew on top of earlier ignimbrites; the whole volcanic activity was controlled by faults.

The mountain is a stratovolcano located atop several lava domes. The stratovolcano consists of lava flows and pyroclastic material that radiate away from the centre of the volcano. Some parasitic vents occur southeast of Sajama and have produced lava domes and lava flows. The parasitic vents away from the volcano are older and their location appears to be controlled by radial dikes; the whole complex is a compound volcano. Two later volcanic units are known as the Colquen Wilqui lavas and the Jacha Khala tuff. Part of the volcano's interior is exposed on the southwestern side. The Sajama volcano rises within a caldera that has been buried by later volcanic activity so that it is only recognizable on its eastern-northeastern side. A circular structure around Sajama may be the origin of the 2.7 million years old Lauca-Perez Ignimbrite.

Argon-argon dating has yielded ages of 679,000 years ago from Sajama and of 80,900 to 25,000 years ago for the Kkota Kkotani lavas, which are unrelated to the main Sajama volcano. The date of the last eruption is not known, it may have occurred in the Pleistocene or Holocene. Hot springs occur on the Junthuma River and reflect the presence of geothermal heat with temperatures of about 250–230 °C (482–446 °F) on the western foot of Sajama, and volcanic rocks of Sajama bear traces of fumarolic activity.

Three major geologic lineaments occur in the region, the north-northwesterly trending Sajama lineament, a west-southwesterly one aligned with high topographical features and a west-northwesterly one. The west-southwesterly one played an important role in the development of Sajama volcano.

=== Composition ===
The volcano has erupted rocks ranging from andesite to rhyodacite, with the main stratovolcano formed by andesites that contain hornblende and pyroxene and phenocrysts of augite, biotite, iron oxide, olivine, orthopyroxene, pargasite, plagioclase, quartz and titanium oxide. Deposits of copper, gold, lead, silver and sulfur were reported as well. The volcanic rocks erupted by Sajama define a potassium-rich calc-alkaline suite and formed through various processes, including assimilation of country rock, fractional crystallization and magma mixing (particularly in the Sayara lavas).

== Climate ==
At Cosapa on the foot of Sajama, annual mean temperatures are about 7.3 °C (45.1 °F) while the town of Sajama sees annual temperatures of 4.3 °C (39.7 °F); precipitation there is about 327 millimetres per year (12.9 in/year). The daily temperature range approaches 40 °C (72 °F) there.

Sajama is located between two climate regimes, a westerly one characterized by a dry climate and the Southeast Pacific High and an easterly one with a moister atmosphere. During the southern hemisphere summer, easterly winds carry moist air towards Sajama where solar insolation then triggers showers and thunderstorms; the moisture ultimately originates in the Atlantic Ocean. During winter, dry westerly winds prevail although cold air outbreaks from the westerlies belt sometimes trigger intense snowfall which is often underestimated by precipitation data. Overall, on the Altiplano precipitation diminishes from the northeast to the southwest.

Summer precipitation is typically reduced during El Nino years, but on Nevado Sajama there is little correlation.

== Vegetation and animals ==
While the vegetation of the surroundings of Sajama is considered to be a dry grassland known as puna, on the mountain itself there is some vertical gradation. Below 4,000 metres (13,000 ft) shrubs such as asteraceae, cactaceae, fabaceae and solanaceae dominate the vegetation. Between 4,000–4,800 metres (13,100–15,700 ft) the last three families become less important. Here especially during the wet season poaceae grasses become more important; finally above 4,800 metres (15,700 ft) frost-tolerant herbs such as Azorella and asteraceae, caryophyllaceae, malvaceae and poaceae make up most of the vegetation. In depressions or places where water occurs, peat bogs called bofedales develop. Taxa that occur here include apiaceae, cyperaceae, Azolla, Distichia and Plantago. Animals include birds, vicuñas, vizcachas and mice; the latter occur up to 5,221 metres (17,129 ft) elevation.

Nevado Sajama features the highest treeline on Earth at 5,200 metres (17,100 ft) elevation, as Polylepis tarapacana forms woodlands that have both a sharp upper and a sharp lower limit on the mountain. The trees are usually no higher than 5 metres (16 ft) and are separated by large distances from each other and appear to localize to spots where water is available. The current woods are remnants; whether the decrease is caused by human impact or climate change is not clear. Protecting these woodlands was the impetus for the 1939 creation of the Sajama National Park.

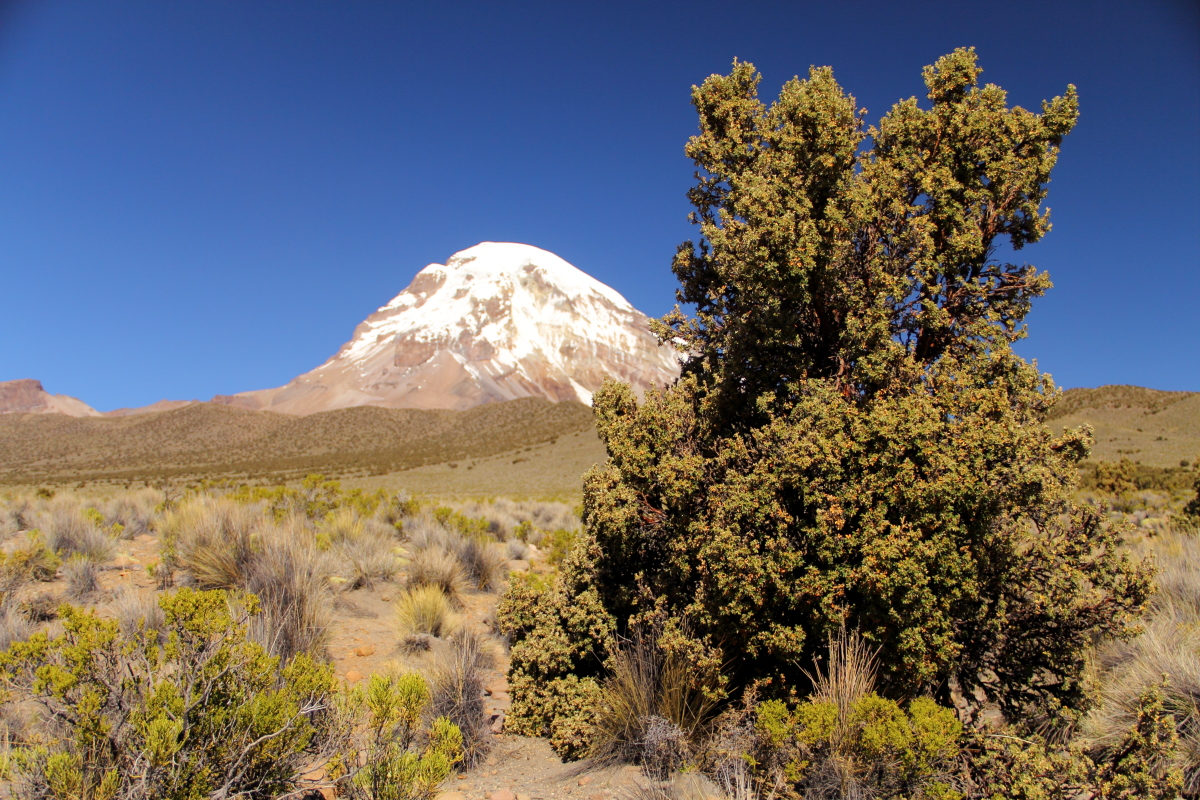

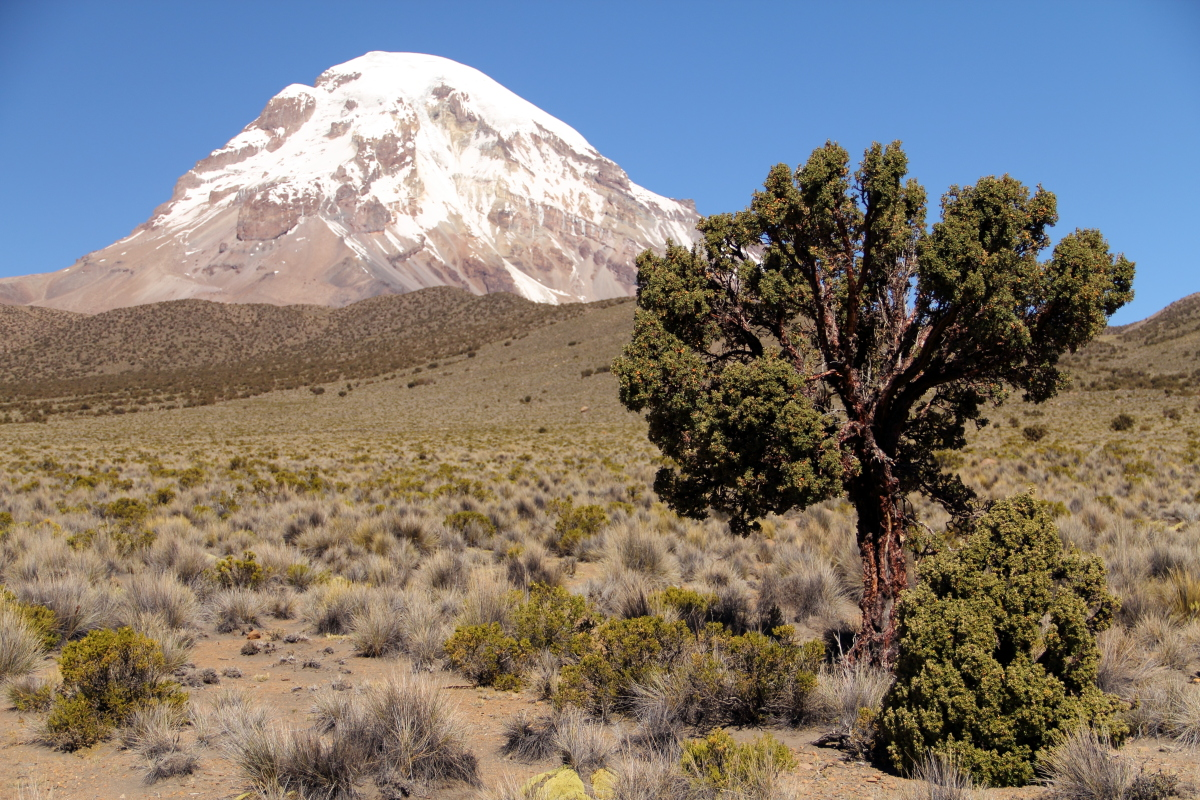

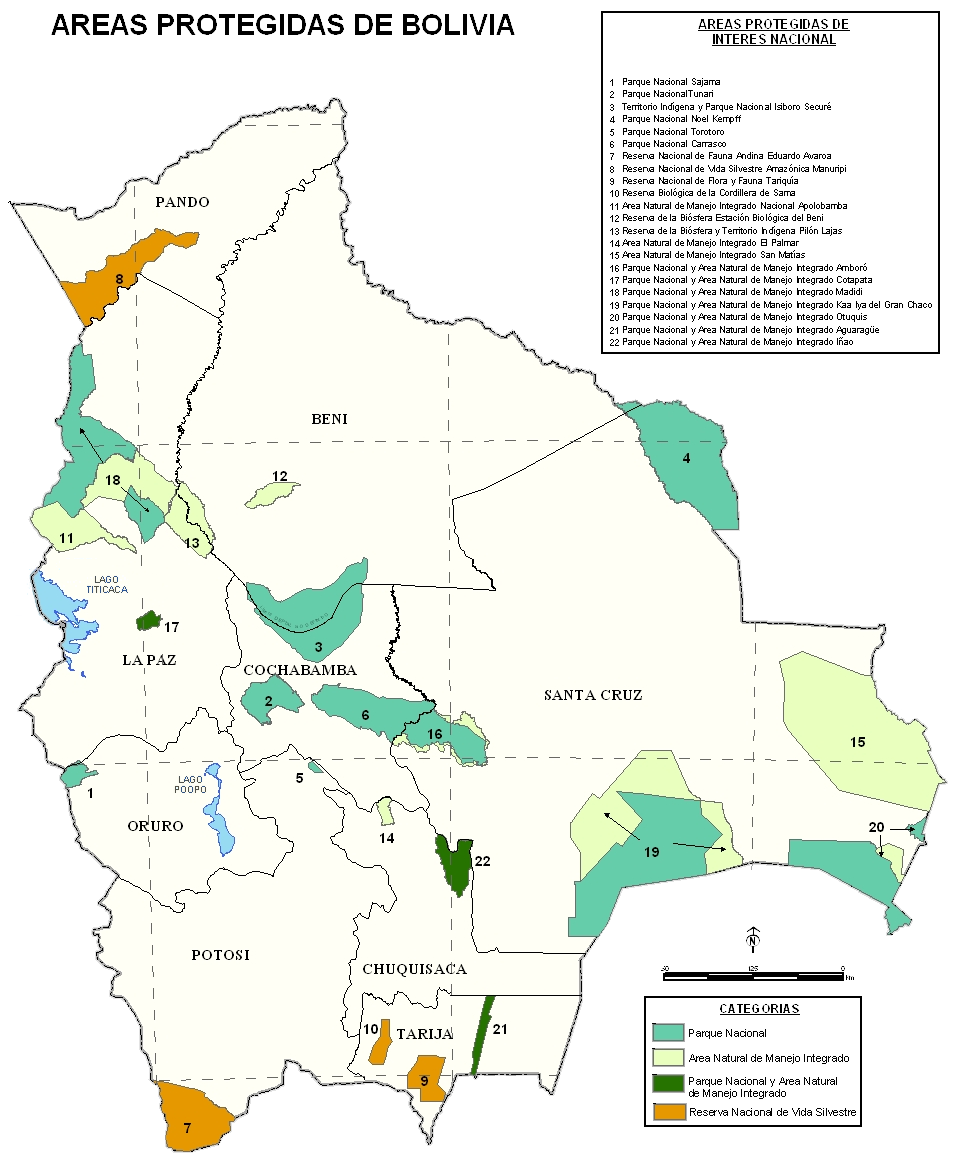

== Glaciers ==
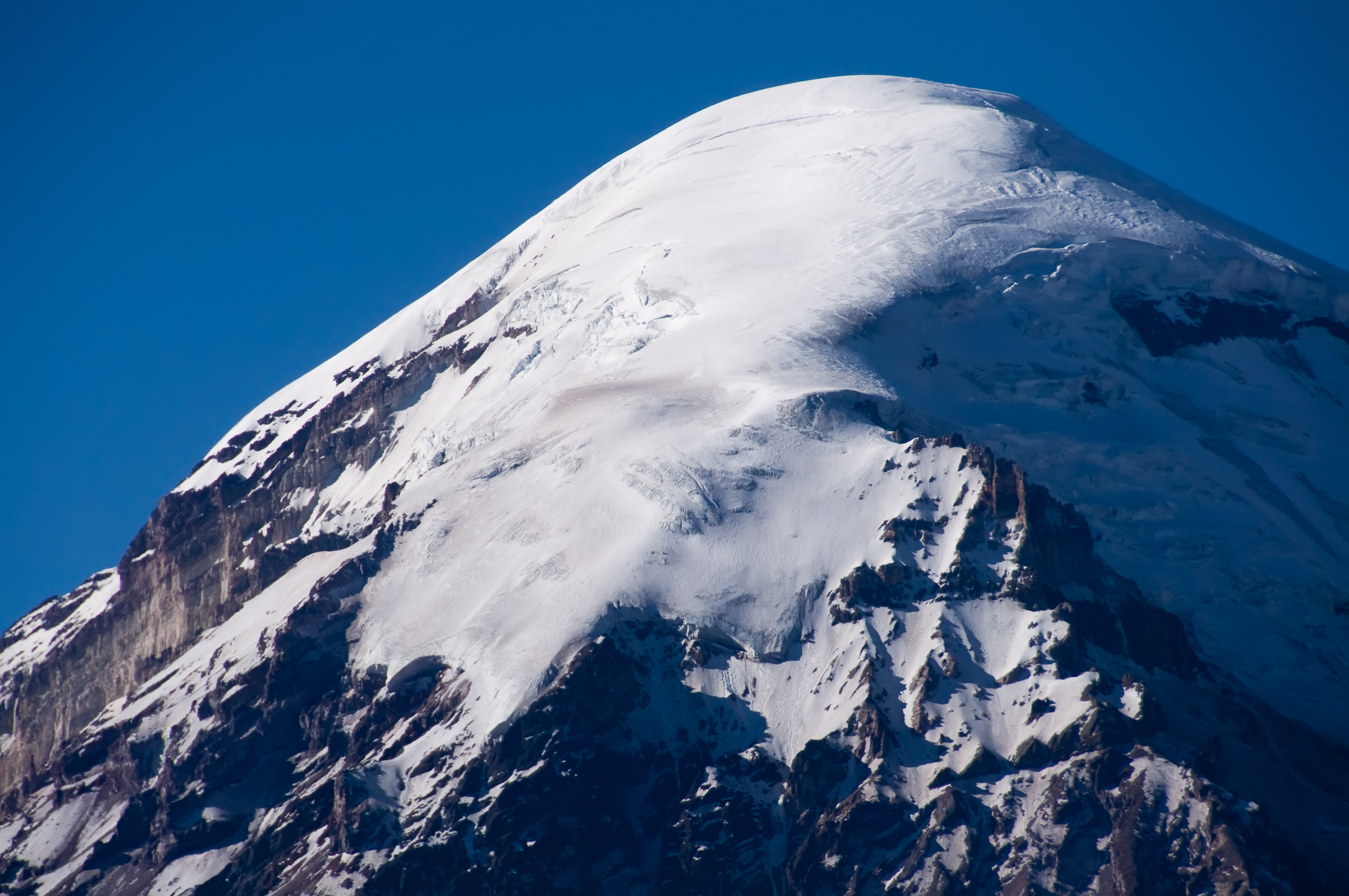
Summit of Sajama

Above 5,600 metres (18,400 ft), Sajama is extensively glaciated. It is among the southernmost mountains in the region with significant glaciers; farther south the atmosphere is too dry to permit the development of glaciers. Two ice cores were taken from the summit area in 1997, preceded by a religious ceremony, as the local Aymara people feared that the mountain deities would be angered by the drilling otherwise. Rock glaciers also occur above the zero degree isotherm above 4,800 metres (15,700 ft), such as on lateral peaks. Meltwater from the glaciers partially seeps underground and only reappears away from the volcano.

Sajama and neighbouring mountains featured much larger glaciers in the past. The history of glaciation on Sajama in general is poorly known, but it appears that the outermost glacial features originated during the late Last Glacial Maximum and the intermediary features during the Middle Holocene which is usually considered to be a warm and dry period in the region.

== Human interactions ==
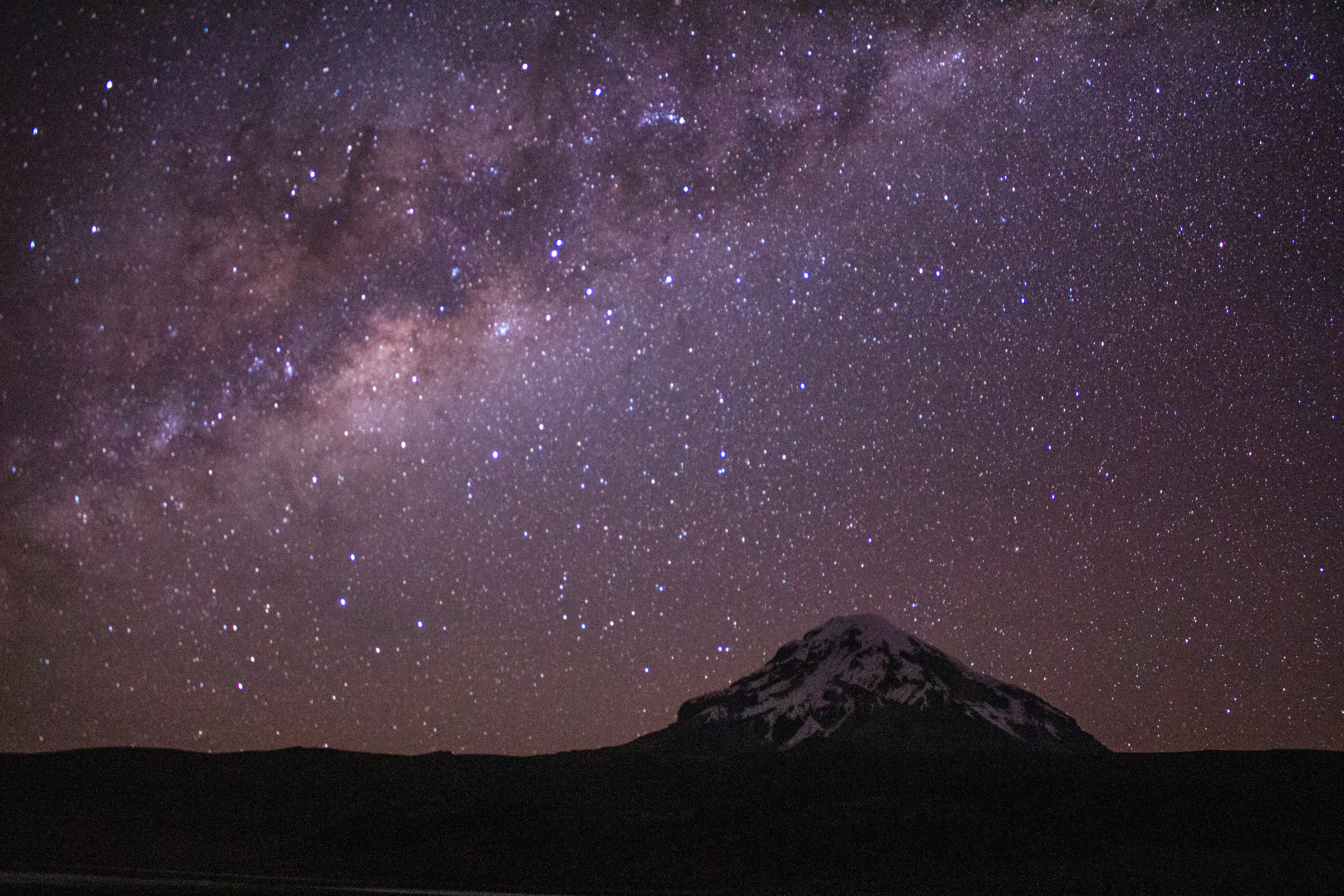
The Milky Way visible over Sajama at night

Sajama is a sacred mountain for the regional communities, and a number of oral traditions record beliefs involving Sajama. In one myth, Sajama is the head of the Mururata mountain after the latter was decapitated by Illimani mountain, both in the Eastern Cordillera. Other mythologies assert that the Nevados de Payachata (Pomerape and Parinacota) are the children of Sajama and Anallaxchi. In another local belief, Tacora and Sajama were two mountains in competition for two women (the Nevados de Payachata). Depending on the specific myth either the two women drove Tacora off and removed the top of the mountain, or Sajama did and injured Tacora; Tacora subsequently fled, shedding blood and a piece of its heart.

There are a number of archaeological sites on the mountain, including chullpa burials and pukara fortifications, distributed over various altitudes and connected through paths. About 40 such sites have been found, most of them at low elevations on the western and northern foot of Sajama. Some of these sites have yielded ceramics. The archaeological sites demonstrate a direct link between the mountain and their builders and with the resolution of local conflicts.

During the second undisputed ascent on the mountain in 1946, one mountaineer disappeared and his body was never found. In August 2001, two teams of Sajama villagers and Bolivian mountain guides played a football match on top of Mount Sajama in an effort to show that altitude itself is not a limitation to physical strain. In 2015, a challenge to hold a political debate on the summit of Sajama was made by a candidate to an election. The 50-boliviano Bolivian banknote launched in October 2018 shows Sajama on its reverse.

== See also ==
- Asu Asuni
- Jach'a Kunturiri
- K'isi K'isini
- Llisa
- Pomerape
- Sajama Lines
- Waña Quta
- List of volcanoes in Bolivia

== Bibliography ==
- Biggar, John (2020). The Andes: A Guide for Climbers and Skiers (5 ed.). Scotland: Andes Publishing. ISBN 978-0-9536087-6-8.
- Darack, Ed (2001). Wild Winds: Adventures in the Highest Andes. Cordee / DPP. ISBN 978-1884980817.
