= Sajama National Park =

National park in Bolivia

- IUCN category II (national park)
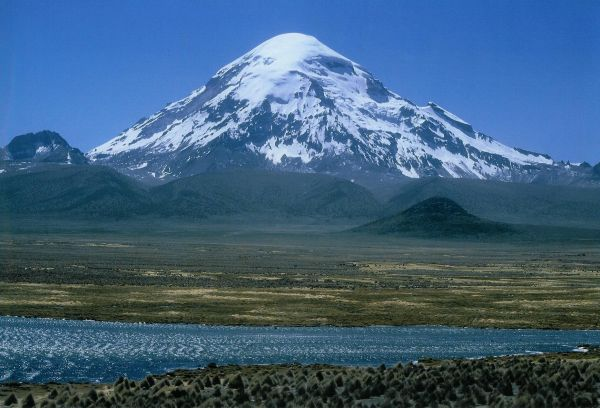
- Nevado Sajama
- Interactive map of Sajama National Park
- Location: Bolivia; Oruro Department
- Coordinates: 18°05′0″S 68°55′0″W
- Area: 1,002 km^{2} (387 sq mi)
- Established: 1939
- Governing body: Servicio Nacional de Áreas Protegidas

Sajama National Park (Spanish: Parque nacional Sajama) is a national park located in the Oruro Department, Bolivia. It borders Lauca National Park in Chile. The park is home to the indigenous Aymara people, whose influential ancient culture can be seen in various aspects throughout the park. It holds many cultural and ecological sites, and is a hub of ecotourism.

== History ==
Sajama National Park is Bolivia's oldest national park. The park lies within the Central Andean dry puna ecoregion. It features a spectacular Andean landscape, with elevations of 4,200–6,542 m (13,780–21,463 ft). It contains the snowy cone of the volcano Sajama, the highest mountain in Bolivia at 6,542 m. The park also includes the Payachata volcanic group.

The area was declared a nature reserve in 1939 because of the native Queñoa de Altura trees that grow on the hillsides of this region. This shrub-like tree has adapted to the high elevations and harsh climate of the Andes. At the time that the area was declared a national park, rampant harvesting of this tree was taking place to create charcoal to supply Bolivian mines.

On 1 July 2003, the park was added to the UNESCO World Heritage Tentative List due to its universal cultural and natural significance.

== Aymara communities ==
The Aymara people are indigenous to the Bolivian and Peruvian Altiplano, and make up a quarter of Bolivia's population. Latest estimates predict about 300 families in the affluence zone of the park and about 100 in the park's interior. Circular houses, traditional to the Aymara, can still be found today. Much of the Aymara population participates in llama and alpaca herding and yarn spinning. Llamas and alpacas usually graze together in mixed herds in and around wetlands. The Aymara people also have the unique tradition of handing down historic textiles through the generations as inherited wealth. Because the Aymara people rely so heavily on the natural environment, they take on a protectoral role regarding its use. For example, the Aymara recently protested against the Dakar Rally, an off-road race taking place through Bolivia's salt flats for the first time. The Aymara cited fears of environmental damage from litter and ruts in the white landscape from the vehicles as cause for concern.

The Aymara communities who have lived in this region since before colonial times have a special bond with the environment and landscape of the park. However, some may question the effectiveness of protected areas when considering socioeconomic impacts on surrounding communities. Regulating the use of protected land may harm the livelihoods and cultures of those people who cherish it the most. However, recent studies in Bolivia have shown no evidence that the establishment of protected areas has exacerbated poverty. If anything, these studies conclude, estimates indicate that communities that are affected by protected areas have experienced greater levels of poverty reduction when compared to similar unaffected communities. Therefore, the presence of Sajama National Park and its management committee may help the Aymara people, giving them power to protect their environment and the organisms that inhabit it.

== Environment ==
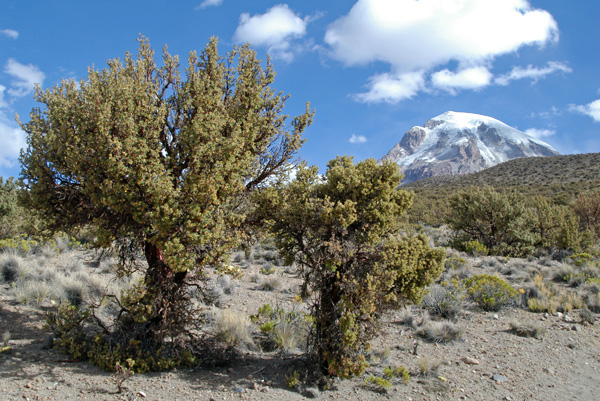
Queñoa trees in Sajama National Park

The area has a semiarid climate, with an annual precipation of 400 mm. There are also very cold nights in this arid region, with frosts occurring well into the typical growing season. The mean temperature is 3.4°C, with a maximun of 17°C and a minimun of -12.9°C. The Bolivian altiplano is not very conducive to productive agriculture. Only hearty crops like tubers and grains such as quinoa can grow in this area, and even then they are not extremely successful.

The queñoa or keñua forests (Polylepis tarapacana) that rise along the slope of Sajama Mountain in the park are regarded as some of the highest forests in the world. There are numerous geysers and hot springs (Aguas Termales) which are about an hour's walk from the village of Sajama. There are also wetlands (bofedales) situated at the foot of the Sajama montain, nourished by melting snow and ice, providing an important water source for wildlife and livestock.

=== Research ===
The icy cap of Mount Sajama, Bolivia's highest point, has enabled a variety of scientific endeavors. The recovery of ice cores from the summit in 1998 offered a unique look at historic South American climatic and atmospheric conditions, and marked the first time that this information of this kind has been available for a location with a tropical latitude. Data from these cores indicates an increase in many atmospheric heavy metals, likely caused by anthropogenic sources. The presence of these metals could be due to the production of non-ferrous metal. Significant in countries such as Chile or Peru, the emissions from this industry have decreased in recent times.

=== Wildlife ===
Sajama is home to a unique set of organisms peculiar to the alpine regions of the Andes. Plants and animals must be able to handle high altitudes with less available oxygen, cold nightly temperatures with frosts well into spring, little shade or protection from the elements, and arid, dry conditions. One example of unique wildlife in the park is the vicuña, a species of camelid related to the llama and the alpaca. These animals are prized because of their soft and warm, but extremely lightweight fur. Historically, only Incan emperors were allowed to wear their wool. Indigenous populations in the area still continue a rich cultural tradition of myths, legends, and rituals involving the vicuña. Once poached to near extinction because their fine, valuable wool, they are now protected in the area and their numbers are rebounding. The 2026 census registered 1,689 vicuña in the area.

The area is also home to armadillos, viscachas and spectacled bears. The park has been designated an Important Bird Area (IBA) by BirdLife International because it supports significant populations of puna rheas, Chilean and puna flamingos, horned coots, diademed plovers, Andean condors and giant conebills.

=== Climate ===
Climate data for Cosapa, elevation 3,922 m (12,867 ft), (1977–2013)
Month	Jan	Feb	Mar	Apr	May	Jun	Jul	Aug	Sep	Oct	Nov	Dec	Year
Record high °C (°F)	26.0 (78.8)	24.5 (76.1)	28.3 (82.9)	25.5 (77.9)	25.0 (77.0)	21.5 (70.7)	22.8 (73.0)	24.6 (76.3)	23.2 (73.8)	23.8 (74.8)	26.6 (79.9)	25.5 (77.9)	28.3 (82.9)
Mean daily maximum °C (°F)	17.6 (63.7)	17.3 (63.1)	17.7 (63.9)	17.9 (64.2)	17.4 (63.3)	16.3 (61.3)	16.3 (61.3)	16.6 (61.9)	18.0 (64.4)	18.2 (64.8)	19.2 (66.6)	18.7 (65.7)	17.6 (63.7)
Daily mean °C (°F)	10.1 (50.2)	9.5 (49.1)	8.3 (46.9)	6.9 (44.4)	5.8 (42.4)	4.4 (39.9)	3.6 (38.5)	4.1 (39.4)	5.2 (41.4)	6.9 (44.4)	8.3 (46.9)	8.8 (47.8)	6.8 (44.3)
Mean daily minimum °C (°F)	2.7 (36.9)	2.2 (36.0)	−1.1 (30.0)	−3.9 (25.0)	−5.7 (21.7)	−7.5 (18.5)	−9.1 (15.6)	−8.4 (16.9)	−7.7 (18.1)	−4.4 (24.1)	−2.6 (27.3)	−1.2 (29.8)	−3.9 (25.0)
Record low °C (°F)	−8.5 (16.7)	−9.2 (15.4)	−14.1 (6.6)	−10.1 (13.8)	−15.4 (4.3)	−18.9 (−2.0)	−16.7 (1.9)	−16.3 (2.7)	−16.3 (2.7)	−16.3 (2.7)	−11.0 (12.2)	−9.8 (14.4)	−18.9 (−2.0)
Average precipitation mm (inches)	120.3 (4.74)	94.7 (3.73)	61.6 (2.43)	5.4 (0.21)	2.7 (0.11)	1.5 (0.06)	1.5 (0.06)	2.3 (0.09)	8.0 (0.31)	6.0 (0.24)	14.9 (0.59)	55.6 (2.19)	374.5 (14.76)
Average precipitation days	16.2	12.9	10.6	2.1	0.4	0.5	0.3	0.8	1.2	2.0	4.0	8.6	59.6
Source: Servicio Nacional de Meteorología e Hidrología de Bolivia

== Tourism ==
Because agriculture is not a viable source of income for many of the people in this region, they have been forced to look for other income options. Ecotourism can significantly aid natural places with weak economies, and help to generate an economical way to promote preservation. However, certain elements should be provided in order to ensure profitable and safe ecotourism. These elements, which are not exclusive or explicitly limiting, include culturally appropriate opportunities for local people, secure land tenure, and a focus on themes broader than simply provided economic opportunity. Arrangements between the Aymara people and the rest of the management committee for the park have helped to ensure extensive planning and local participation in decisions is taking place, but admittedly plans are not always perfect. Even when using the most optimistic of scenarios, SERNAP concedes that a fair number of indigenous people will have to leave this region in order to assure a minimum livelihood. In situations like these, every cost and benefit of ecotourism must be carefully weighed.

Ecotourism can be defined in a variety of ways, but broadly it is travel that has the object of enjoying features of what is seen as the natural, beautiful, and exotic environment. Main themes of ecotourism also involve sustainable activities and behavior that results in minimal negative consequences for the environment. Until recently, tourist activity in the park has been relatively nonexistent. The park is located far from any urban centers, and surrounded by mostly undeveloped land lacking infrastructure. However, a focus area for the co-administrative management committee is the creation of sustainable and responsible income-generating practices. For example, the Tomarapi eco-lodge opened in 2003, and provides local food and lodging for between 2000 and 3000 visitors a year. The lodge is currently managed entirely by native Aymara villagers.

This area of Bolivia also features the Sajama Lines, mysterious lines covering the altiplano, etched into ground over thousands of years by the ancient ancestors of the Aymara people. The lines are estimated to be about 16,000 kilometers in length, roughly three times the breadth of the United States. The lines are thought to have been used as ancient pilgrimage routes.

The park is also scattered with cultural treasures and remnants of the Aymara's ancient culture. Chullpas, tall funerary towers devoted to noble Aymara families, dot the landscape. These shrines are thought to have been deliberately placed in visible areas to ensure reverence and remembrance for the dead. Pucaras, ancient fortifications, can also be found.

== Management ==
Bolivian law defines protected areas as “natural areas with or without human intervention, declared under state protection by law, in order to protect and preserve the flora and fauna, genetic resources, natural ecosystems, watersheds and values of scientific, esthetic, historical, economic, and social interest, in order to conserve and protect natural and cultural heritage of the country”. As all protected areas in Bolivia are inhabited, nature conservation is not possible against the will of the local people. It is necessary to take their traditional rights, existing value systems and social organization into account.

The reserve is jointly administered by park service officials and the indigenous people, the Aymara. However, the collaborative efforts between the Aymara and the Bolivian national parks authority (Servicio Nacional de Áreas Protegidas, SERNAP) did not begin until 1998, when SERNAP was formed. Sajama National Park did not have a formal administration nor park rangers until 1995, and relations between the Aymara people and this early park administration was essentially nonexistent due to top-down approaches and policies. Sajama's co-administrative Management Committee now includes representatives from each of the communities, the sub-alcaldía (local administration's decentralized office in Sajama village), the mayor of Curahuara de Carangas, a representative of the prefectural administration, and delegates from different NGOs active in the area.

From the beginning, this diverse committee laid out fairly detailed plans to ensure that their economic and conservational goals were met. The original committee members believed that the success of the park depended upon the incorporation of three things: planning, participation, and projects. Planning regulations and developing a "horizon" for the park was a long and arduous process, but it brought the diverse group of people closer together. The planning and discussion helped to eradicate previously held prejudices between the Aymara people and the newly instated park rangers. Through dialogue, often new ideas and techniques for management and conservation can surface. From the aspect of planning, municipal, regional, and traditional authorities, as well as community members are required to participate in the management of Bolivia's national parks. This ensures that the voices and views of all stakeholders are clearly acknowledged. This process also increases trust between the different inhabitants of the area, because they know that they are playing a role in the process. Finally, projects are aimed to generate income while offering alternative livelihoods that employ a more sustainable use of biodiversity resources.

Besides ecotourism, there have been arrangements to create initiatives for the sustainable management of the park's vicuñas. Vicuña fur is extremely valuable, with scarves of their wool costing well over $1,000. However, it is slow growing and may take anywhere from 2–3 years to regrow to a commercially viable length after shearing. By caring for the vicuñas, the Aymara deepen their connection to their environment and create a continuing means for income. However, the trade of vicuña wool is highly regulated, causing slow trade and sometimes even an inability to trade.

While a local management co-administrative approach may seem like a very useful and effective means to protect this land, it also has its detriments. Some challenges to management systems like the one in place in this park are unclear roles, distrust, and poor communication, which has been seen in Sajama.

== See also ==
- Sajama Lines
- Waña Quta
- Constitution of Bolivia
- Ecotourism
