= Qutallani =

Mountain in Bolivia

- Location within Bolivia

Highest point
- Elevation: 4,706 m (15,440 ft)
- Coordinates: 18°11′45″S 68°25′35″W

Geography
- Location: Bolivia, Oruro Department, Sajama Province
- Parent range: Andes

Qutallani (Aymara quta lake, -lla, -ni suffixes, "the one with a little lake", also spelled Kkotallani) is a 4,706-metre-high (15,440 ft) mountain in the Andes of Bolivia. It lies in the Oruro Department, Sajama Province, Turco Municipality. Qutallani is situated south-west of the mountains Chuqil Qamiri, Wintu Qachi and Wila Qullu.
