= Ch'iyar Jaqhi (La Paz) =

Mountain in Bolivia

- Location within Bolivia

Highest point
- Elevation: 4,720 m (15,490 ft)
- Coordinates: 17°19′36″S 69°23′00″W

Geography
- Location: Bolivia, La Paz Department; José Manuel Pando Province
- Parent range: Andes

Ch'iyar Jaqhi (Aymara ch'iyara black, jaqhi precipice, cliff, "black cliff", also spelled Chiarjakke) is a mountain in the Andes of Bolivia, about 4,720 metres (15,486 ft) high. It is situated in the La Paz Department, José Manuel Pando Province, Catacora Municipality. Ch'iyar Jaqhi lies south-east of the mountains Laram Q'awa, Chuqiwa Qullu (Chuquivakkollu), Wila Qullu and Apachita and north-west of the Sirk'i volcano. It is situated at one of the affluents of the Ch'allipiña River (Challipiña).
