= Llallawa (disambiguation) =

Llallawa (Aymara for a monstrous potato (like two potatoes) or animal, Quechua for the god of seed-time during the Inca period, also spelled Llallagua, Llallahua) may refer to:

- Llallawa, a mountain in the Puno Region, Peru
- Llallawa (Bolivia), a mountain in the José Manuel Pando Province, La Paz Department, Bolivia
- Llallawa (Oruro), a mountain in the Oruro Department, Bolivia
- Llallawa (Patacamaya), a mountain in the Patacamaya Municipality, Aroma Province, La Paz Department, Bolivia
- Llallawa (Sica Sica), a mountain in the Sica Sica Municipality, Aroma Province, La Paz Department, Bolivia
- Llallagua, a town in the Potosí Department, Bolivia
