= Lluxita Punta =

Mountain in Bolivia

- Location within Bolivia

Highest point
- Elevation: 4,706 m (15,440 ft)
- Coordinates: 17°15′10″S 67°44′26″W

Geography
- Location: Bolivia; La Paz Department
- Parent range: Andes

Lluxita Punta (Aymara lluxi shell of a mussel; landslide, also spelled Llojeta Punta) is a 4,706-metre-high (15,440 ft) mountain in the Bolivian Andes. It is located in the La Paz Department, Aroma Province, Sica Sica Municipality. Lluxita Punta lies southwest of Janq'u Uta and southeast of Llallawa.
