= Misa Willk'i =

Mountain in Bolivia

- Location within Bolivia

Highest point
- Elevation: 5,098 m (16,726 ft)
- Coordinates: 17°13′31″S 69°24′14″W

Geography
- Location: Bolivia, La Paz Department; José Manuel Pando Province
- Parent range: Andes

Misa Willk'i (Aymara misa offering, willk'i gap, also spelled Mesavilque) is a 5,098-metre-high (16,726 ft) mountain in the Andes of Bolivia. It is located in the La Paz Department, José Manuel Pando Province, at the border of the Catacora Municipality and the Santiago de Machaca Municipality. Misa Willk'i lies northeast of Sinijawi and southeast of Wari Kunka.
