= Catacora =

- Town
- Location within Bolivia
- Coordinates: 17°10′S 69°29′W
- Country: Bolivia
- Department: La Paz Department
- Province: José Manuel Pando Province
- Municipality: Catacora Municipality

Population (2001)
  - Total: 529
- Time zone: UTC-4 (BOT)

Catacora is a location in the La Paz Department in Bolivia. It is the location of the Catacora Municipality, the second municipal section of the José Manuel Pando Province.

Catacora can also refer to the noble cacique family of the same last name. Their seat was in the city of Acora in the Province of Puno. The Catacora were one of the few Caciques in Peru to retain their prestige and land after the revolution of Túpac Amaru II. This was both due to their role in containing previous rebellions against the Viceroyalty of Peru, which earned them recognition from the Spanish Crown and for their active role to fight the revolution. During the war of independence the Catacora remained loyal to Spain and held Acora and most of Puno in force. They played a mayor role in the reconquest of Arequipa by the Spanish Empire. They send nearly 2000 men to fight in Jose de Canterac's royalist army. It was only after the Spanish defeat in the Battle of Ayacucho, where all royalists troops were ordered to stand down by Viceroy La Cerna, that the Catacora capitulated. After the war of independence they moved their seat to the small town of Caminaca until the Hacienda system was finally disbanded with the agricultural revolution.

== See also ==
- Sirk'i volcano
