= Papel Pampa Municipality =

Coordinates: 17.6667°S 67.8333°W

- Municipality
- Interactive map of Papel Pampa Municipality
- Country: Bolivia
- Department: La Paz Department
- Province: Gualberto Villarroel Province
- Seat: Papel Pampa
- Time zone: UTC-4 (BOT)

Papel Pampa Municipality is the second municipal section of the Gualberto Villarroel Province in the La Paz Department, Bolivia. Its seat is Papel Pampa.
