= Chuqi Q'awa (Aroma) =

Mountain inn the Bolivian Andes

- Location within Bolivia

Highest point
- Elevation: 4,720 m (15,490 ft)
- Coordinates: 17°01′14″S 68°20′05″W

Geography
- Location: Bolivia; La Paz Department, Aroma Province, Colquencha Municipality
- Parent range: Andes

Chuqi Q'awa (Aymara chuqi gold, q'awa little river, ditch, crevice, fissure, gap in the earth, "gold brook" or "gold ravine", also spelled Chuqui Khaua) is a mountain in the Andes of Bolivia which reaches a height of approximately 4,720 m (15,490 ft). It is located in the La Paz Department, Aroma Province, Colquencha Municipality. It lies northwest of Qillqatiri.

The Jach'a Jawira (Aymara for "big river") which later is named Colorado, Mani, then Colorado again and finally Katari flows along its western slopes. It empties into Wiñaymarka Lake, the southern part of Lake Titicaca.
