= Inka Pukara (La Paz) =

Mountain in Bolivia

- Location within Bolivia

Highest point
- Elevation: 4,400 m (14,400 ft)
- Coordinates: 17°12′39″S 67°51′23″W

Geography
- Location: Bolivia; La Paz Department
- Parent range: Andes

Inka Pukara (Aymara Inka Inca, pukara fortress, "Inka fortress", also spelled Inca Pucara) is a mountain in the Bolivian Andes which reaches a height of approximately 4,400 m (14,400 ft). It is located in the La Paz Department, Aroma Province, Patacamaya Municipality, northeast of Patacamaya.
