= Araj Huma =

Village in Bolivia

- Village
- Location within Bolivia
- Coordinates: 17°38′S 67°49′W
- Country: Bolivia
- Department: La Paz Department
- Province: Gualberto Villarroel Province
- Municipality: San Pedro de Curahuara Municipality

Population (2001)
  - Total: 403
- Time zone: UTC-4 (BOT)

Araj Huma is a village in Bolivia. In 2001 it had a population of 403.
