= Chilahuala =

Coordinates: 17°28′S 68°02′W

- Town
- Interactive map of Chilahuala
- Country: Bolivia
- Department: La Paz Department
- Province: Gualberto Villarroel Province
- Municipality: San Pedro de Curahuara Municipality

Population (2001)
  - Total: 220
- Time zone: UTC-4 (BOT)

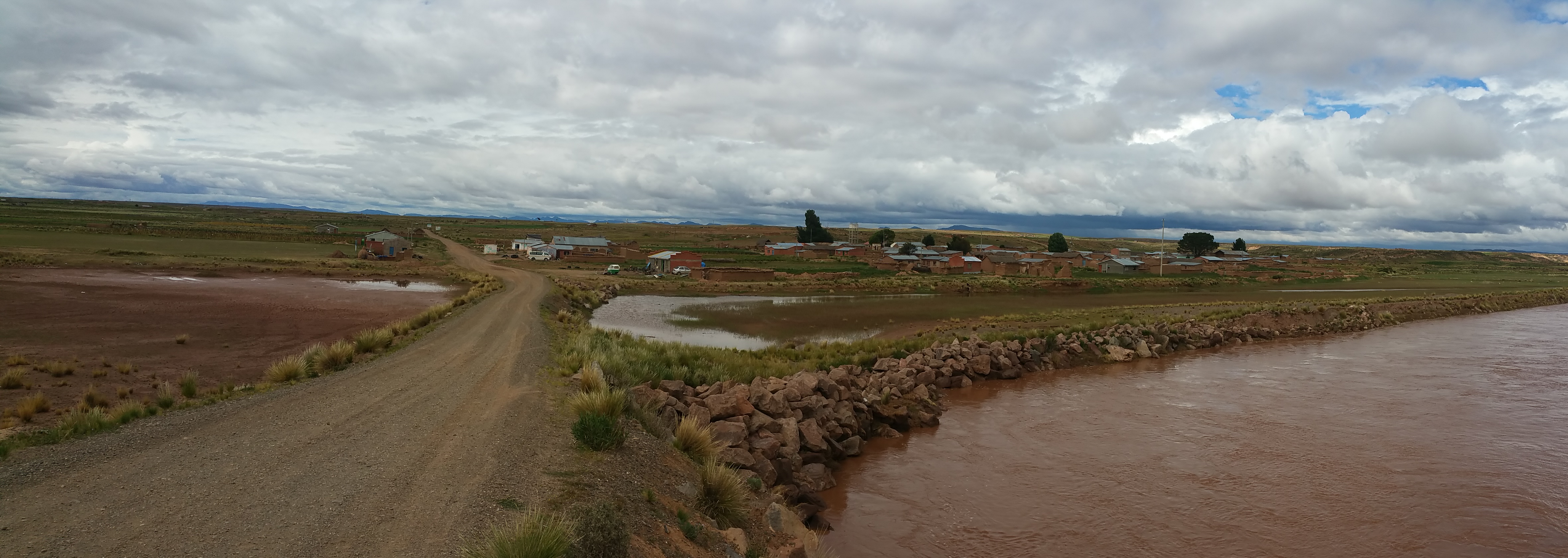
Chilahuala, San pedro de curahuara

Chilahuala is a small town in Bolivia. In 2001 it had a population of 220.
