= Wisk'achani (Aroma) =

Mountain in Bolivia

- Location within Bolivia

Highest point
- Elevation: 4,620 m (15,160 ft)
- Coordinates: 17°14′40″S 67°41′49″W

Geography
- Location: Bolivia; La Paz Department
- Parent range: Andes

Wisk'achani (Aymara wisk'acha a rodent, -ni a suffix, "the one with the viscacha", Hispanicized spelling Viscachani) is a mountain in the Bolivian Andes which reaches a height of approximately 4,620 m (15,160 ft). It is located in the La Paz Department, Aroma Province, Sica Sica Municipality. Wisk'achani lies northwest of Tanka Tanka.
