= Calamarca Municipality =

Calamarca Qala Marka
- Municipality
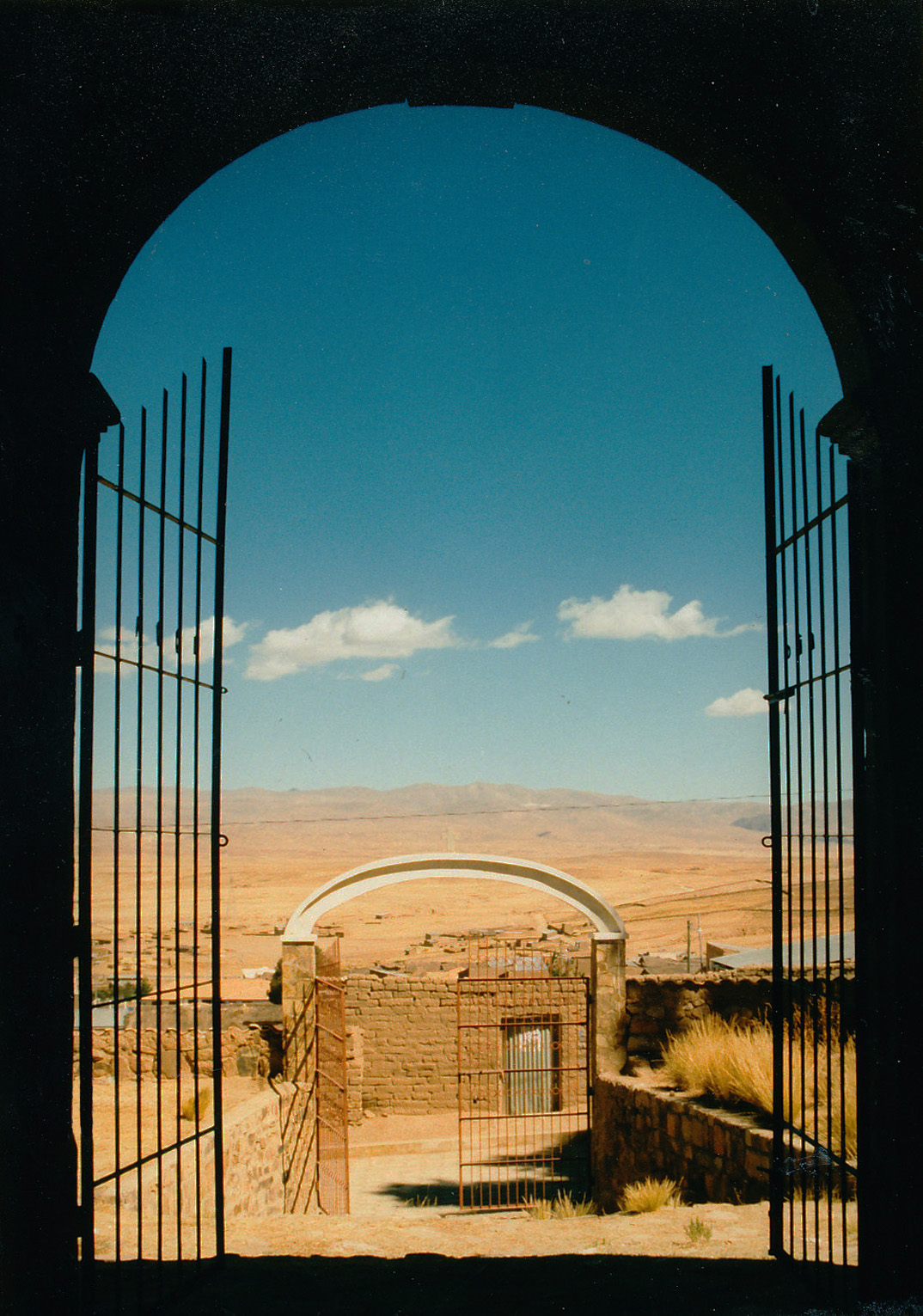

- Location within Bolivia
- Coordinates: 16°54′S 68°7′W
- Country: Bolivia
- Department: La Paz Department
- Province: Aroma Province
- Seat: Calamarca

Population (2012)
  - Total: 14,604
- Time zone: UTC-4 (BOT)

Calamarca (in Hispanicized spelling) or Qala Marka (Aymara qala stone, marka village, town, place, land, "place of stone") is the fourth municipal section of Aroma Province in the La Paz Department of Bolivia. It is located on the Altiplano and its seat is the town of Calamarca.

The municipality was created by law on 21 December 1948. At present it is divided into seven cantons (cantones): Calamarca, Vilaque Copata, Sivicani, Ajoya, Villa Carmen de Caluyo, San Antonio de Senkata and Cosmini.

== Villages ==
- Copata

== See also ==
- Jach'a Quta
- Urqu Jawira

== Sources ==
- Instituto Nacional de Estadística de Bolivia
