= Copata =

- Town
- Location within Bolivia
- Coordinates: 16°51′S 68°10′W
- Country: Bolivia
- Department: La Paz Department
- Province: Aroma Province
- Municipality: Calamarca Municipality
- Elevation: 13,051 ft (3,978 m)

Population (2001)
  - Total: 723
- Time zone: UTC-4 (BOT)

Copata (also Vilaque Copata) is a small town in La Paz Department of Bolivia. In 2009 it had an estimated population of 893.
