= Umala Municipality =

- Municipality
- Location within Bolivia
- Coordinates: 17°22′S 68°1′W
- Country: Bolivia
- Department: La Paz Department
- Province: Aroma Province
- Seat: Umala

Population (2001)
  - Total: 9,583
- Time zone: UTC-4 (BOT)

Umala Municipality is the second municipal section of the Aroma Province in the La Paz Department, Bolivia. Its seat is Umala.

== See also ==
- Cañaviri
- Kuntur Amaya
