= Calamarca =

Calamarca Qala Marka
- Town
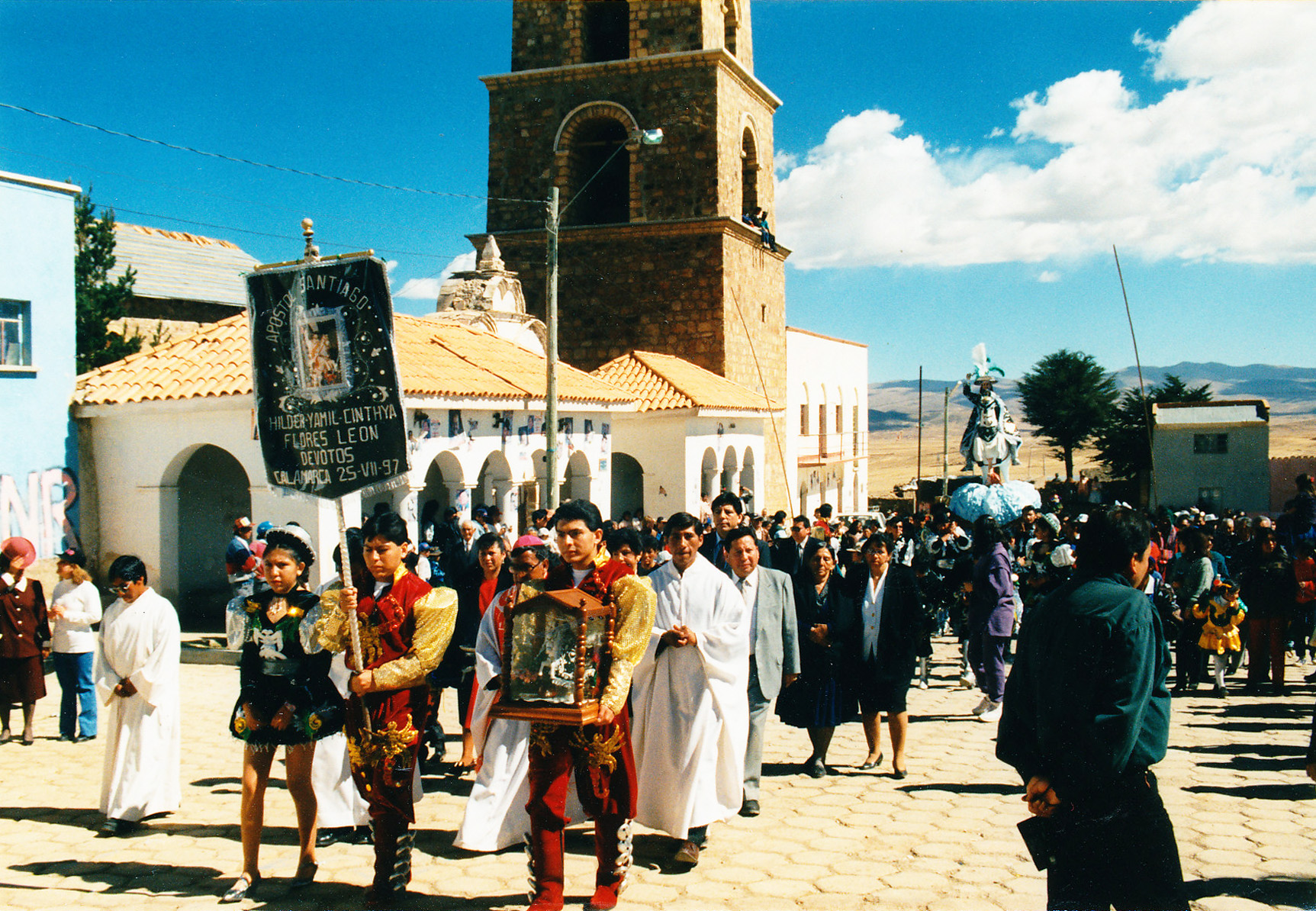
- La Fiesta in Calamarca

- Location within Bolivia
- Coordinates: 16°54′23″S 68°06′55″W
- Country: Bolivia
- Department: La Paz Department
- Province: Aroma Province
- Municipality: Calamarca Municipality

Population (2012)
  - Total: 1,417
- Time zone: UTC-4 (BOT)
- Climate: ET

Calamarca (Hispanicized spelling) or Qala Marka (Aymara qala stone, marka village, town, place, land, "place of stone") is a town in the La Paz Department in Bolivia. It is the seat of Calamarca Municipality, the fourth municipal section of Aroma Province. It lies on the Altiplano on the east side of the main road between La Paz and Patacamaya, about 60 km south of La Paz.

Calamarca has a late 16th-century church with a silver altar worked in a rococo style, and two rococo altar pieces. It also contains the largest preserved amount of colonial Ángeles arcabuceros paintings in a site.

== Notable people ==
- Master of Calamarca - 18th-century painting.
- Rosmery Mollo - reproductive health activist.

== See also ==
- Urqu Jawira
