= Chacarilla =

Chacarilla may refer to:

== Places ==
=== Bolivia ===
- Chacarilla Municipality, an administrative division that forms part of La Paz Department, Bolivia
  - Chacarilla Canton, a canton of the municipality

=== Chile ===
- Chacarilla Formation, a geologic formation in northern Chile

=== Peru ===
- Chacarilla del Estanque, a neighbourhood of Lima, Peru

== Other ==
- Croton eluteria, a plant also known as chacarilla, among other names
