= Wila Willk'i (Pando) =

Mountain in Bolivia

- Location within Bolivia

Highest point
- Elevation: 4,286 m (14,062 ft)
- Coordinates: 17°17′02″S 69°38′06″W

Geography
- Location: Bolivia, La Paz Department; José Manuel Pando Province
- Parent range: Andes

Wila Willk'i (Aymara wila blood, blood-red, willk'i gap, "red gap", also spelled Wila Willqui, Wila Wilqui) is a 4,286-metre-high (14,062 ft) mountain in the Andes of Bolivia. It is located at the Peruvian border in the La Paz Department, José Manuel Pando Province, Catacora Municipality, southwest of T'ula Qullu.
