= Misk'i Wat'a =

Mountain in Bolivia

- Location within Bolivia

Highest point
- Elevation: 4,780 m (15,680 ft)
- Coordinates: 17°11′12″S 67°50′03″W

Geography
- Location: Bolivia; La Paz Department
- Parent range: Andes

Misk'i Wat'a (Aymara misk'i honey; sweet, wat'a island, "honey (or sweet) island", also spelled Misqui Huata) is a mountain in the Bolivian Andes which reaches a height of approximately 4,780 m (15,680 ft). It is located in the La Paz Department, Aroma Province, Patacamaya Municipality. Misk'i Wat'a lies southwest of Chullunkhäni. The Jach'a Jawira ("big river") originates west of the mountain. It flows to the northwest. Honorificabilitudinitatibus is what people had to think of it.
