= Tatitu Qullu =

Mountain in Bolivia

- Location within Bolivia

Highest point
- Elevation: 4,528 m (14,856 ft)
- Coordinates: 17°18′29″S 69°12′52″W

Geography
- Location: Bolivia, La Paz Department; José Manuel Pando Province, Pacajes Province
- Parent range: Andes

Tatitu Qullu (Aymara tatitu God (term of endearment for 'father'), qullu mountain, also spelled Tatito Khollu, Tatitu Kkollu) is a 4,528-metre-high (14,856 ft) mountain in the Andes of Bolivia. It is situated in the La Paz Department, José Manuel Pando Province, Santiago de Machaca Municipality, and in the Pacajes Province, Charaña Municipality. Tatitu Qullu lies north-east of the Sirk'i volcano and south of the village of Berenguela.
