= T'ula Qullu =

Mountain in Bolivia

- Suri Qullu
- Location within Bolivia

Highest point
- Elevation: 4,842 m (15,886 ft)
- Coordinates: 17°15′30″S 69°33′58″W

Geography
- Location: Bolivia, La Paz Department; José Manuel Pando Province
- Parent range: Andes

T'ula Qullu (Aymara t'ula wood, burning material, qullu mountain, "wood mountain", also spelled Thola Khollu, Thola Kkollu) or Suri Qullu (Aymara suri rhea, "rhea mountain", also spelled Zuricollo) is a 4,842-metre-high (15,886 ft) mountain in the Andes of Bolivia. It is situated in the La Paz Department, José Manuel Pando Province, Catacora Municipality, T'ula Qullu Canton. T'ula Qullu lies near the border to Peru, between the Peruvian mountain Chila 5,184 m (17,008 ft) in the west and Sinijawi 5,068 m (16,627 ft) in the east, northwest of the Sirk'i volcano.

== See also ==
- Parina Quta
