= Umala =

- Town
- Location within Bolivia
- Coordinates: 17°22′S 68°01′W
- Country: Bolivia
- Department: La Paz Department
- Province: Aroma Province
- Municipality: Umala Municipality

Population (2001)
  - Total: 152
- Time zone: UTC-4 (BOT)
- Climate: BSk

Umala is a location in La Paz in Bolivia. It is the seat of the Umala Municipality, the second municipal section of the Aroma Province.
