= Collana =

- Town
- Location within Bolivia
- Coordinates: 16°54′S 68°17′W
- Country: Bolivia
- Department: La Paz Department
- Province: Aroma Province
- Municipality: Collana Municipality

Population (2001)
  - Total: 1,936
- Time zone: UTC-4 (BOT)

Collana is a location in the La Paz Department in Bolivia. It is the seat of the Collana Municipality, the seventh municipal section of the Aroma Province.
