= Janq'u Jaqhi (Aroma) =

Mountain in Bolivia

- Location within Bolivia

Highest point
- Elevation: 4,163 m (13,658 ft)
- Coordinates: 17°13′57″S 67°39′49″W

Geography
- Location: Bolivia; La Paz Department, Aroma Province
- Parent range: Andes

Janq'u Jaqhi (Aymara janq'u white, jaqhi precipice, cliff, "white cliff", also spelled Jankho Jakke) is a 4,163-metre-high (13,658 ft) mountain in the Bolivian Andes. It is located in the La Paz Department, Aroma Province, Sica Sica Municipality.
