= San Pedro de Curahuara Municipality =

Coordinates: 17.5833°S 68°W

- Municipality
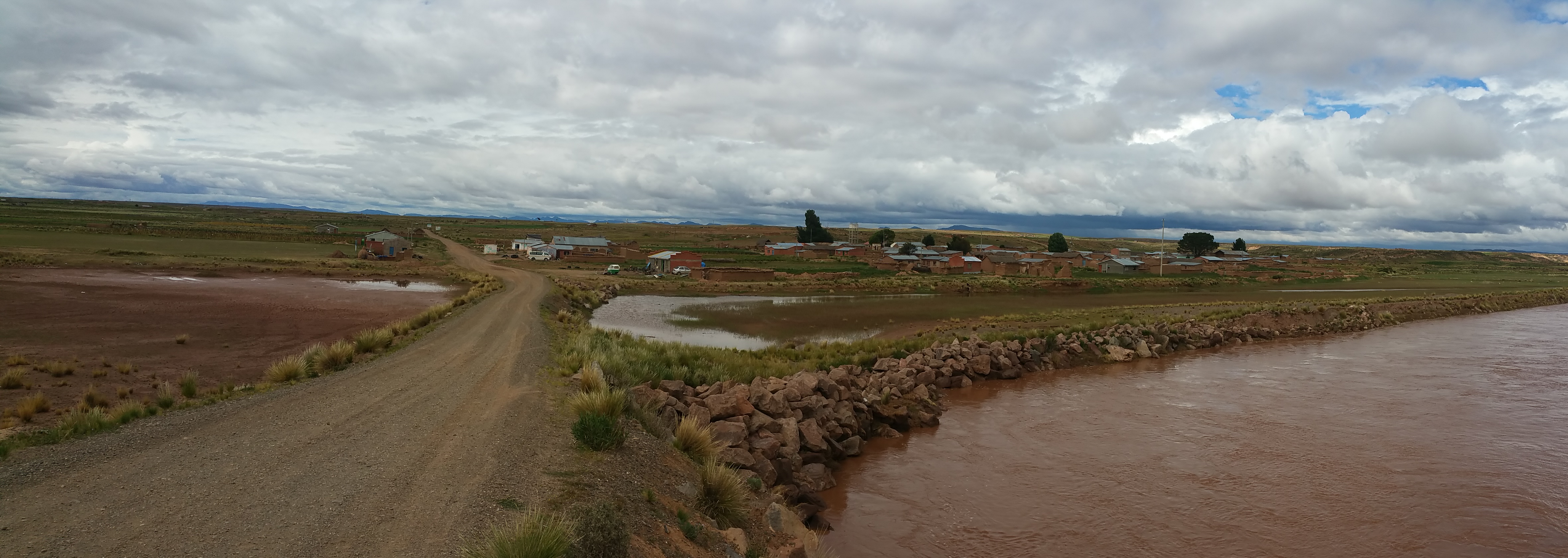
- Interactive map of San Pedro de Curahuara Municipality
- Country: Bolivia
- Department: La Paz Department
- Province: Gualberto Villarroel Province
- Seat: San Pedro de Curahuara
- Time zone: UTC-4 (BOT)

San Pedro de Curahuara Municipality is the first municipal section of the Gualberto Villarroel Province in the La Paz Department, Bolivia. Its seat is San Pedro de Curahuara. It had 8,858 inhabitants in 2010.

== Villages ==
In addition to San Pedro de Curahuara, the municipality also comprises hamlets, among which:

- Araj Huma
- Chilahuala
