= Q'ara Willk'i =

Mountain in Bolivia

- Location within Bolivia

Highest point
- Elevation: 4,680 m (15,350 ft)
- Coordinates: 17°01′37″S 68°17′35″W

Geography
- Location: Bolivia; La Paz Department
- Parent range: Andes

Q'ara Willk'i (Aymara q'ara bald, bare, willk'i gap, "bald gap", also spelled Khara Willkhi) is a mountain in the Andes of Bolivia which reaches a height of approximately 4,680 m (15,354 ft). It is located in the La Paz Department, Aroma Province, Colquencha Municipality.

Q'ara Willk'i is also the name of a stream which originates at the mountain. It flows to the Q'arawi Jawira (Carahui Jahuira) in the east.
