= Sipi Sipi =

Mountain in Bolivia

- Location within Bolivia

Highest point
- Elevation: 4,367 m (14,327 ft)
- Coordinates: 17°14′25″S 67°48′19″W

Geography
- Location: Bolivia; La Paz Department
- Parent range: Andes

Sipi Sipi (Aymara, also spelled Sipisipi) is a 4,367-metre-high (14,327 ft) mountain in the Bolivian Andes. It is located in the La Paz Department, Aroma Province, Patacamaya Municipality. Sipi Sipi lies southwest of Malla Jaqhi.
