= Catacora Municipality =

Coordinates: 17.25°S 69.4167°W

- Municipality
- Interactive map of Catacora Municipality
- Country: Bolivia
- Department: La Paz Department
- Province: José Manuel Pando Province
- Seat: Catacora
- Time zone: UTC-4 (BOT)

Catacora Municipality is the second municipal section of the José Manuel Pando Province in the La Paz Department, Bolivia. Its seat is Catacora.

== Geography ==
Some of the highest mountains of the municipality are listed below:

- Apachita
- Ch'alla Willk'i
- Ch'iyar Jaqhi
- Jach'a Qiñwa Qullu
- Janq'u Qullu
- Jichu Kunka
- Jisk'a Qiñwa Qullu
- Jisk'a Wari Kunka
- Katari
- Laram Q'awa
- Llallawa
- Misa Willk'i
- P'iq'iñ Q'ara
- Qiñwani
- Qiwñuyu
- Qutani
- Sinijawi
- Sirk'i
- T'ula Qullu
- Wari Kunka
- Wila Qullu
- Wila Willk'i

== See also ==
- Parina Quta
