= Kuntur Amaya =

Ancient Andean site

- Interactive map of Kuntur Amaya
- 17°19′30″S 68°05′50″W
- Location: Bolivia, La Paz Department, Aroma Province, Umala Municipality
- Region: Andes

Kuntur Amaya (Spanish: Cóndor Amaya) is an archaeological site in Bolivia. It is located in the La Paz Department, Aroma Province, Umala Municipality, near Wayllani (Huayllani). The site was declared a National Monument on December 12, 2006. The site contains chullpas (Aymara funerary towers).
