= Apachita (Pando) =

Mountain in Bolivia

- Location within Bolivia

Highest point
- Elevation: 4,800 m (15,700 ft)
- Coordinates: 17°18′22″S 69°24′04″W

Geography
- Location: Bolivia, La Paz Department; José Manuel Pando Province
- Parent range: Andes

Apachita (Aymara for the place of transit of an important pass in the principal routes of the Andes; name for a stone cairn in the Andes, a little pile of rocks built along the trail in the high mountains, Hispanicized spelling Apacheta) is a mountain in the Andes of Bolivia, about 4,800 metres (15,748 ft) high. It is situated in the La Paz Department, José Manuel Pando Province, Catacora Municipality. Apachita lies south of the mountain Wila Qullu, north-west of Ch'iyar Jaqhi and south-east of Laram Q'awa and Chuqiwa Qullu (Chuquivakkollu).
