= Sica Sica =

Sica Sica Sika Sika
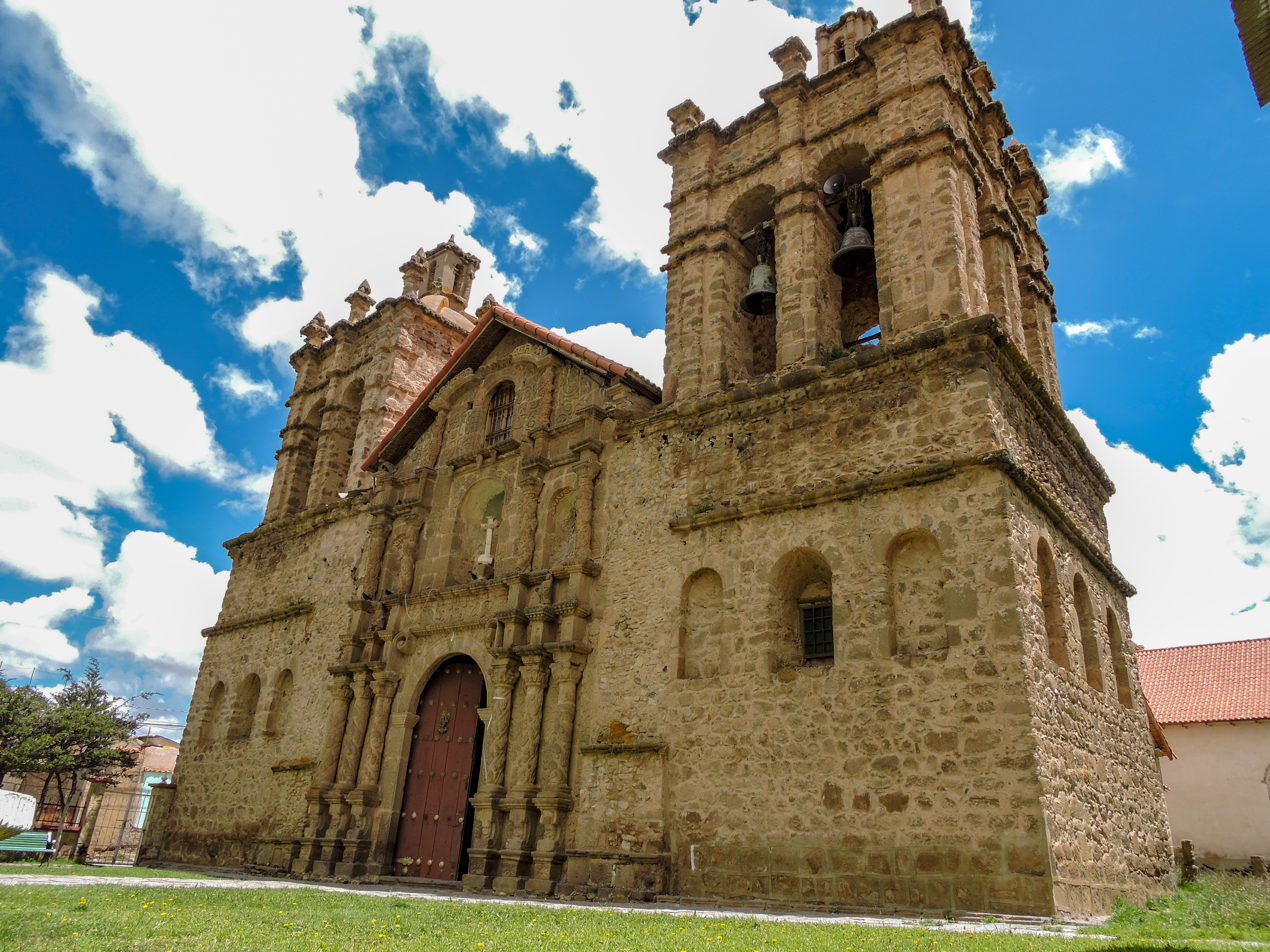
- Church of Sica Sica

- Location in Bolivia
- Coordinates: 17°20′S 67°44′W
- Country: Bolivia
- Department: La Paz Department
- Province: Aroma Province
- Municipality: Sica Sica Municipality

Population (2001)
  - Total: 3,831
- Time zone: UTC-4 (BOT)
- Climate: ET

Sica Sica (Aymara: Sika Sika) is a small town and capital of Aroma Province in the La Paz Department of western Bolivia. It is located some 115 kilometres from La Paz, on the southwestern edge of the Serrania de Sicasica, a ridge, which is between La Paz and Cochabamba in a south-easterly direction. As of 2008 it has an estimated population of 4,620. The town is situated at a height of 3,933 metres on the Bolivian Altiplano. Nearby Sica Sica is Ayo Ayo, the birthplace of the indigenous rebel leader Julián Apaza.

The cathedral, Fernando Soria, is a National Monument from the 17th Century. It holds relics in the form of woodcarving, and gold and silver work from the time of the Viceroyalty of Peru. Hot springs near the town also attract tourists.
