= Lake Parinacota (Bolivia-Peru) =

Lake on the border of Bolivia and Peru

- Location within Bolivia Location within Peru Location within South America
- Interactive map of Lake Parinacota
- Location: Bolivia, Peru; La Paz Department, Puno Region
- Coordinates: 17°11′20″S 69°34′20″W
- Max. length: 1.3 km (0.81 mi)
- Max. width: 0.5 km (0.31 mi)
- Surface elevation: 4,216 m (13,832 ft)

Parinacota (possibly from Aymara parina flamingo, quta lake, "flamingo lake") is a lake on the border of Bolivia and Peru at a height of about 4,216 metres (13,832 ft). On the Bolivian side it is located in the La Paz Department, José Manuel Pando Province, Qataqura Municipality, T'ula Qullu Canton, on the Peruvian side in the Puno Region, El Collao Province, Capazo District. It is connected with the Parinacota River which lies on the border south of the lake. Parinacota is about 1.3 km long and 0.5 km at its widest point.

== See also ==
- T'ula Qullu
