= Collana Municipality =

- Municipality
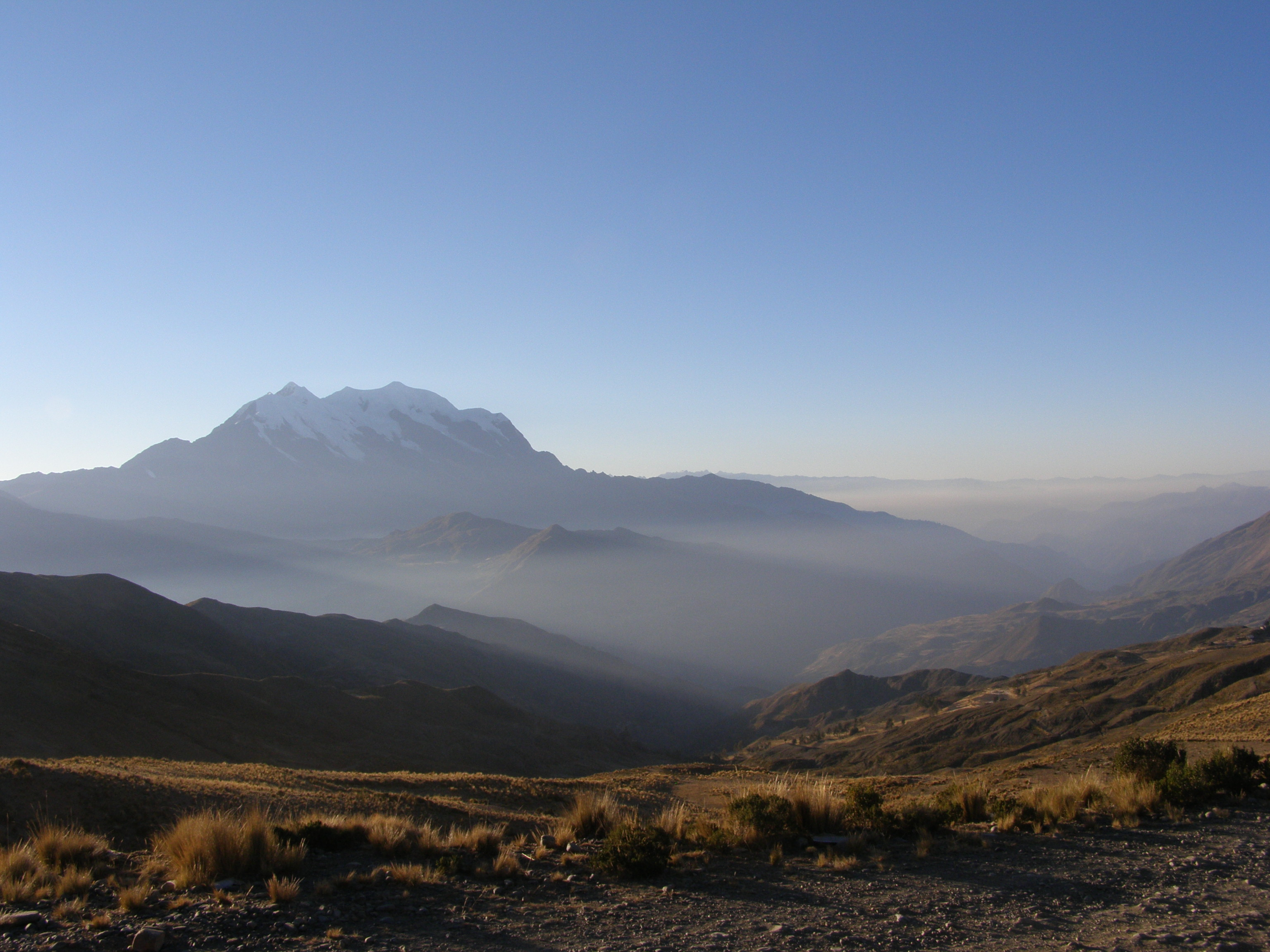
- Collana skyline view

- Location within Bolivia
- Coordinates: 16°54′S 68°17′W
- Country: Bolivia
- Department: La Paz Department
- Province: Aroma Province
- Seat: Collana

Population (2001)
  - Total: 2,927
- Time zone: UTC-4 (BOT)

Collana Municipality is the seventh municipal section of the Aroma Province in the La Paz Department, Bolivia. Its seat is Collana.
