= Qiwñuyu =

Mountain in Bolivia

- Location within Bolivia

Highest point
- Elevation: 4,428 m (14,528 ft)
- Coordinates: 17°17′04″S 69°32′17″W

Geography
- Location: Bolivia, La Paz Department; José Manuel Pando Province
- Parent range: Andes

Qiwñuyu (Aymara qiwña a kind of tree (polylepis), uyu corral, "qiwña corral", also spelled Keunuyo, Keuñuyo) is a 4,428-metre-high (14,528 ft) mountain in the Andes of Bolivia. It is situated in the La Paz Department, José Manuel Pando Province, Catacora Municipality. The Junt'uni Jawira originates at the mountain. It flows to the southeast.
