= Jach'a Qiñwa Qullu =

Mountain in Bolivia

- Location within Bolivia

Highest point
- Elevation: 4,800 m (15,700 ft)
- Coordinates: 17°10′50″S 69°26′47″W

Geography
- Location: Bolivia, La Paz Department; José Manuel Pando Province
- Parent range: Andes

Jach'a Qiñwa Qullu (Aymara jach'a big, qiñwa a kind of tree, qullu mountain, "big qiñwa mountain", also spelled Jacha Khenwakkollu) is a mountain in the Andes of Bolivia which reaches a height of approximately 4,800 m (15,700 ft). It is located in the La Paz Department, José Manuel Pando Province, Catacora Municipality. Jach'a Qiñwa Qullu lies north of the Jaruma River, east of Ch'alla Willk'i.
