= Ayo Ayo Municipality =

- Municipality
- Location within Bolivia
- Coordinates: 17°5′S 68°0′W
- Country: Bolivia
- Department: La Paz Department
- Province: Aroma Province
- Seat: Ayo Ayo

Population (2001)
  - Total: 6,981
- Time zone: UTC-4 (BOT)

Ayo Ayo Municipality is the third municipal section of the Aroma Province in the La Paz Department, Bolivia. Its seat is Ayo Ayo.
