= Santiago de Machaca Municipality =

Coordinates: 17.1667°S 69.25°W

Santiago de Machaca
- Municipality
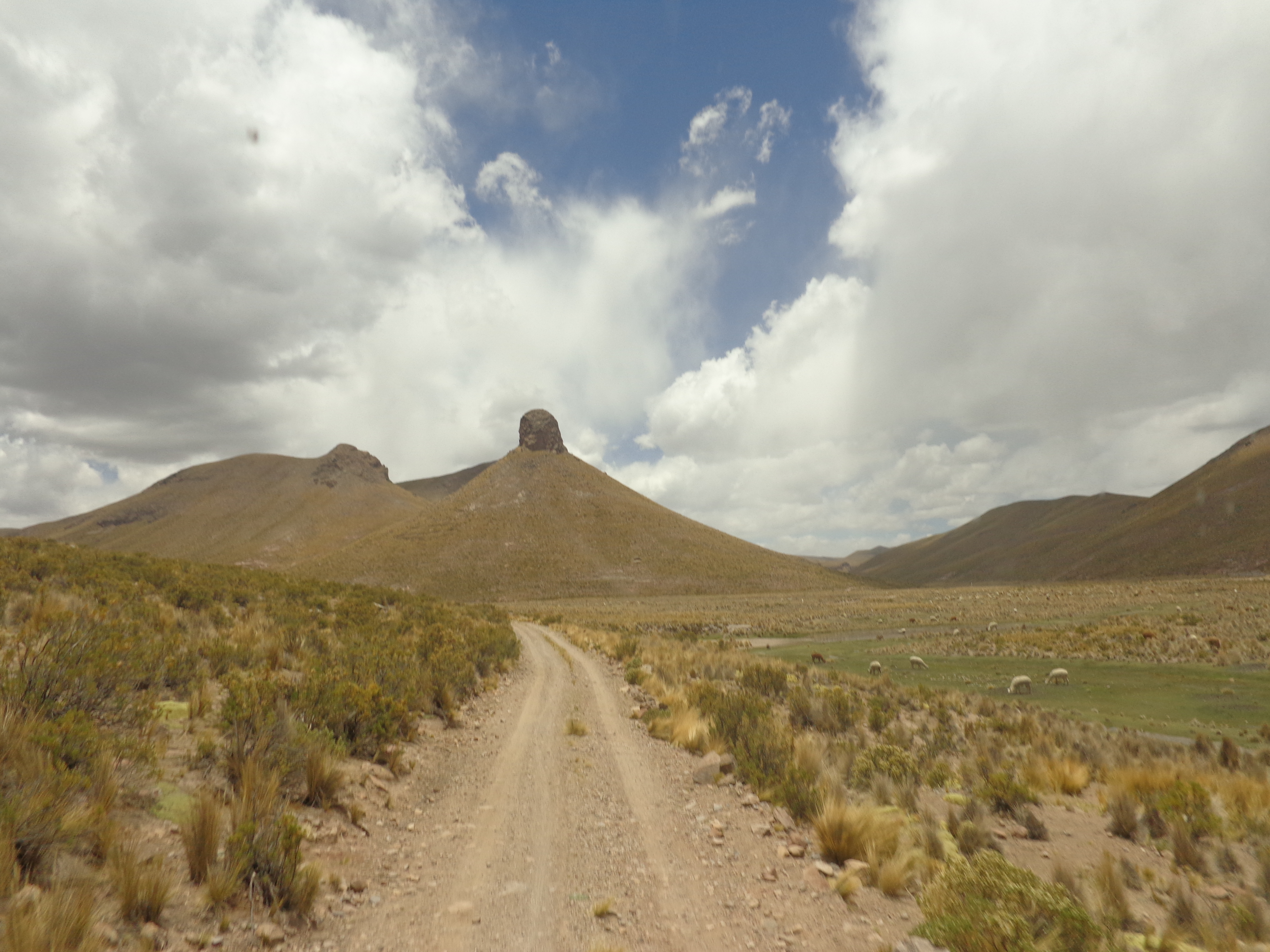
- Nuñu Qullu ("breast mountain") in the Santiago de Machaca Municipality
- Interactive map of Santiago de Machaca
- Country: Bolivia
- Department: La Paz Department
- Province: José Manuel Pando Province
- Seat: Santiago de Machaca
- Time zone: UTC-4 (BOT)

Santiago de Machaca is the first municipal section of the José Manuel Pando Province in the La Paz Department, Bolivia. Its seat is Santiago de Machaca.

== See also ==
- Llallawa
- Misa Willk'i
- Tatitu Qullu
- Thujsa Jawira
- Wari Kunka
