= Chuqi Sillani (Aroma-Loayza) =

Mountain in Aroma and Loayza Provinces, Bolivia

- Location within Bolivia

Highest point
- Elevation: 4,754 m (15,597 ft)
- Coordinates: 17°12′22″S 67°41′38″W

Geography
- Location: Bolivia; La Paz Department, Aroma Province, Loayza Province
- Parent range: Andes

Chuqi Sillani (Aymara chuqi gold, silla cane of maize, -ni a suffix, "the one with the golden cane of maize", also spelled Chuquisillani) is a 4,754-metre-high (15,597 ft) mountain in the Bolivian Andes. It is located in the La Paz Department, Aroma Province, Sica Sica Municipality, and in the Loayza Province, Luribay Municipality.
