= Jach'a Quta =

Jach'a Quta (Aymara jach'a big, quta, lake, "Big lake", also spelled Jacha Kkota, Jachcha Khota, Jachcha Kkota) may refer to:

- Jach'a Quta (Aroma), a lake in the Aroma Province, La Paz Department, Bolivia
- Jach'a Quta (Murillo), a lake in the Murillo Province, La Paz Department, Bolivia
- Jach'a Quta (Sud Yungas), a lake in the Sud Yungas Province, La Paz Department, Bolivia
