= Machaqa Marka =

Machaqa Marka or Machaq Marka (Aymara machaqa new, marka village, "new village", also spelled Machacamarca, Machajamarca) may refer to:

- Machacamarca (Aroma), a small town in the La Paz Department, Bolivia
- Machacamarca (Oruro), a small town in the Oruro Department, Bolivia
- Machaq Marka, a mountain in the La Paz Department, Bolivia
- Machaqa Marka (Cochabamba), a mountain in the Cochabamba Department, Bolivia
