= Patacamaya Municipality =

Patacamaya Patakamaya
- Municipality
- Flag

- Location within Bolivia
- Coordinates: 17°15′S 67°55′W
- Country: Bolivia
- Department: La Paz Department
- Province: Aroma Province
- Seat: Patacamaya

Population (2012)
  - Total: 22,858
- Time zone: UTC-4 (BOT)

Patacamaya or Patakamaya (Aymara) is the fifth municipal section of the Aroma Province in the La Paz Department in western Bolivia. Its seat is Patacamaya.

== See also ==
- Chullunkhäni
- Ch'alla Jawira
- Inka Pukara
- Jach'a Jawira
- Llallawa
- Misk'i Wat'a
- Sipi Sipi
