= Colquencha =

- Town
- Location within Bolivia
- Coordinates: 16°56′S 68°15′W
- Country: Bolivia
- Department: La Paz Department
- Province: Aroma Province
- Municipality: Colquencha Municipality
- Time zone: UTC-4 (BOT)

Colquencha is a town in Aroma Province in the La Paz Department, in the western part of Bolivia. It is the seat of the Colquencha Municipality.
