= Lahuachaca =

- Town
- Location within Bolivia
- Coordinates: 17°22′S 67°40′W
- Country: Bolivia
- Department: La Paz Department
- Province: Aroma Province
- Elevation: 12,441 ft (3,792 m)

Population (2012)
  - Total: 5,874
- Time zone: UTC-4 (BOT)

Lahuachaca is a small town in Bolivia, in Aroma Province. It lies 123 km from La Paz, on the Bolivian Altiplano, with the Cordillera Occidental to the west and the Cordillera Central to the east.

== Climate ==
The average temperature in Lahuachaca is 9 °C. The average temperature varies from 7° in July to 11° in December. The average annual rainfall is 600 mm. The average monthly rainfall varies from 10 mm in June and July to 100 mm in December through until February.

== Population ==
Population estimates for recent years include:

- 1992 - 2562 inhabitants
- 2001 - 2986 inhabitants
- 2012 - 5874 inhabitants
