= Qhapaqa (La Paz) =

Mountain in Bolivia

- Location within Bolivia

Highest point
- Elevation: 4,362 m (14,311 ft)
- Coordinates: 17°24′06″S 67°46′42″W

Geography
- Location: Bolivia; La Paz Department, Aroma Province
- Parent range: Andes

Qhapaqa (Aymara for "king", "sir" or "rich", also spelled Capaja) is a 4,362-metre-high (14,311 ft) mountain in the Bolivian Andes, part of the La Paz Department of Aroma Province, near the Sica Sica Municipality southwest of Ayamaya.
