= Millu Jaqhi =

Mountain in Bolivia

- Location within Bolivia

Highest point
- Elevation: 4,186 m (13,734 ft)
- Coordinates: 17°13′34″S 67°31′41″W

Geography
- Location: Bolivia; La Paz Department
- Parent range: Andes

Millu Jaqhi (Aymara millu a kind of salpeter, jaqhi precipice, cliff, "salpeter cliff", also spelled Millu Jakke) is a 4,186-metre-high (13,734 ft) mountain in the Bolivian Andes. It is located in the La Paz Department, Aroma Province, Sica Sica Municipality.

The Qullpa Jawira ("salpeter river", Khollpa Jahuira) originates south of Millu Jaqhi. It flows to the north.
