= Jach'a Quta (Aroma) =

Lake in La Paz Department, Bolivia

- Location within Bolivia Location within South America
- Interactive map of Jach'a Quta
- Location: Bolivia, La Paz Department, Aroma Province, Calamarca Municipality
- Coordinates: 16°53′47″S 68°05′58″W

Jach'a Quta (Aymara jach'a big, great, quta lake, "great lake", Hispanicized spelling Jacha Kkota) is a lake in Bolivia located in the La Paz Department, Aroma Province, Calamarca Municipality, west of Calamarca.

== See also ==
- Urqu Jawira
