= Qiñwani =

Mountain in Bolivia

- Location within Bolivia

Highest point
- Elevation: 4,380 m (14,370 ft)
- Coordinates: 17°19′04″S 69°32′15″W

Geography
- Location: Bolivia, La Paz Department; José Manuel Pando Province
- Parent range: Andes

Qiñwani (Aymara qiñwa, qiwña a kind of tree (polylepis), -ni a suffix, "the one with the qiwña tree", also spelled Khenwani) is a mountain in the Andes of Bolivia which reaches a height of approximately 4,380 m (14,370 ft). It is situated in the La Paz Department, José Manuel Pando Province, Catacora Municipality. Qiñwani lies at the Peruvian border, west of the Junt'uni Jawira.
