= Llallawa (Patacamaya) =

Mountain in Bolivia

- Location within Bolivia

Highest point
- Elevation: 4,327 m (14,196 ft)
- Coordinates: 17°13′21″S 67°50′02″W

Geography
- Location: Bolivia; La Paz Department
- Parent range: Andes

Llallawa (Aymara for a monstrous potato (like two potatoes) or animal, also spelled Llallagua) is a 4,327-metre-high (14,196 ft) mountain in the Bolivian Andes. It is located in the La Paz Department, Aroma Province, Patacamaya Municipality. Llallawa lies northeast of Qullchani (Colchani), west of the Jach'a Jawira.
