= Chullunkhäni (La Paz) =

Mountain in Bolivia

- Location within Bolivia

Highest point
- Elevation: 4,824 m (15,827 ft)
- Coordinates: 17°10′48″S 67°49′53″W

Geography
- Location: Bolivia; La Paz Department
- Parent range: Andes

Chullunkhäni (Aymara chullunkhä ('ä' stands for a long 'a') icicle, -ni a suffix, "the one with icicles", also spelled Chulluncani) is a 4,824-metre-high (15,827 ft) mountain in the Bolivian Andes. It is located in the La Paz Department, Aroma Province, Patacamaya Municipality. This is where the Jach'a Jawira originates. It flows to the southwest where it seeps away near the village of Chhijmuni (Chijmuni) in the Sica Sica Municipality.
