= Wila Pukara (Aroma) =

Mountain in Bolivia

- Location within Bolivia

Highest point
- Elevation: 4,300 m (14,100 ft)
- Coordinates: 17°17′19″S 67°41′30″W

Geography
- Location: Bolivia; La Paz Department
- Parent range: Andes

Wila Pukara (Aymara wila blood, blood-red, pukara fortress, "red fortress", also spelled Wila Pucara) is a mountain in the Bolivian Andes which reaches a height of approximately 4,300 m (14,100 ft). It is located in the La Paz Department, Aroma Province, Sica Sica Municipality.
