= Janq'u Qullu (Pando) =

Mountain in Bolivia

- Location within Bolivia

Highest point
- Elevation: 4,660 m (15,290 ft)
- Coordinates: 17°10′27″S 69°24′17″W

Geography
- Location: Bolivia, La Paz Department; José Manuel Pando Province
- Parent range: Andes

Janq'u Qullu (Aymara janq'u white, qullu mountain, "white mountain", also spelled Jankho Kkollu) is a mountain in the Andes of Bolivia which reaches a height of approximately 4,660 m (15,290 ft). It is located in the La Paz Department, José Manuel Pando Province, Catacora Municipality. The Janq'u Qullu River which originates southwest of the mountain flows along its slopes.
