= Machacamarca, Aroma =

Machacamarca Machaqa Marka
- Town
- Location within Bolivia
- Coordinates: 16°53′S 68°12′W
- Country: Bolivia
- Department: La Paz Department
- Province: Aroma Province
- Municipality: Colquencha Municipality
- Canton: Nueva Esperanza de Machacamarca Canton
- Elevation: 12,830 ft (3,910 m)

Population (2001)
  - Total: 1,400
- Time zone: UTC-4 (BOT)

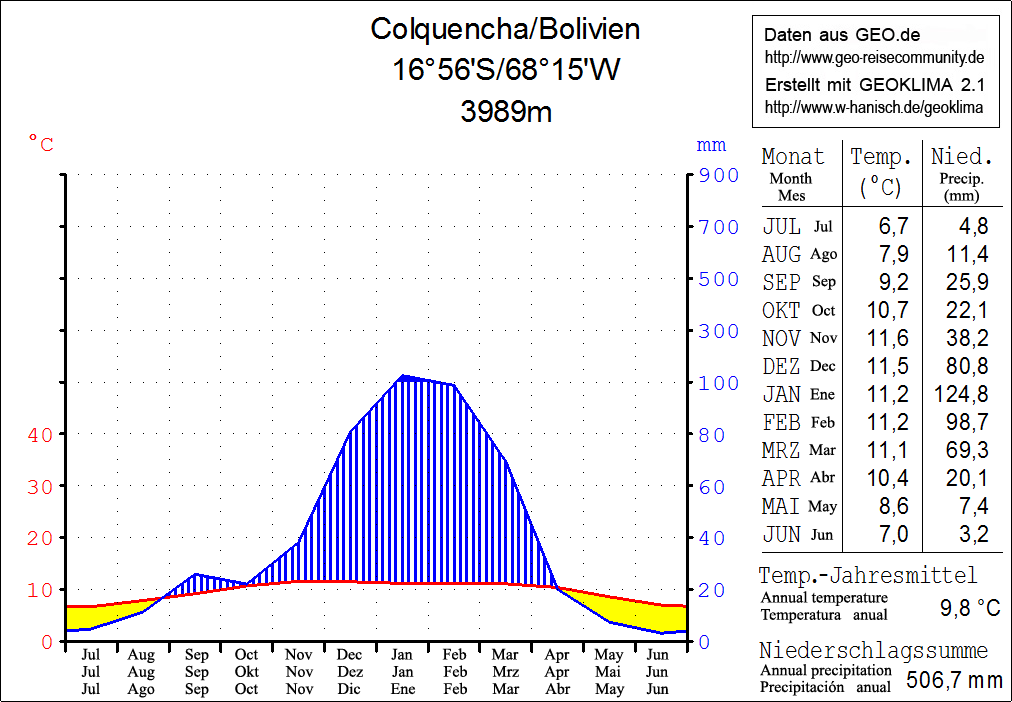
A climate chart for Colquencha in the Walter and Lieth format, showing temperature and precipitation data in metric units

Machacamarca is a small town in the La Paz Department in Bolivia. It is the seat of the Nueva Esperanza de Machacamarca Canton, one of the five cantons of the Colquencha Municipality which is the sixth municipal section of the Aroma Province. The town is situated at the railway that leads from La Paz to Oruro. At the time of census 2001 Machacamarca had a population of 1,400.

Machacamarca is the hispanicized spelling of Aymara: Machaqa Marka, machaqa = new, marka = village, town: So the name means "new village" or "new town".

The people in the Colquencha Municipality are mainly Aymara (94.6%) and most citizens speak Aymara followed by Spanish.
