= Santiago de Machaca =

- Town
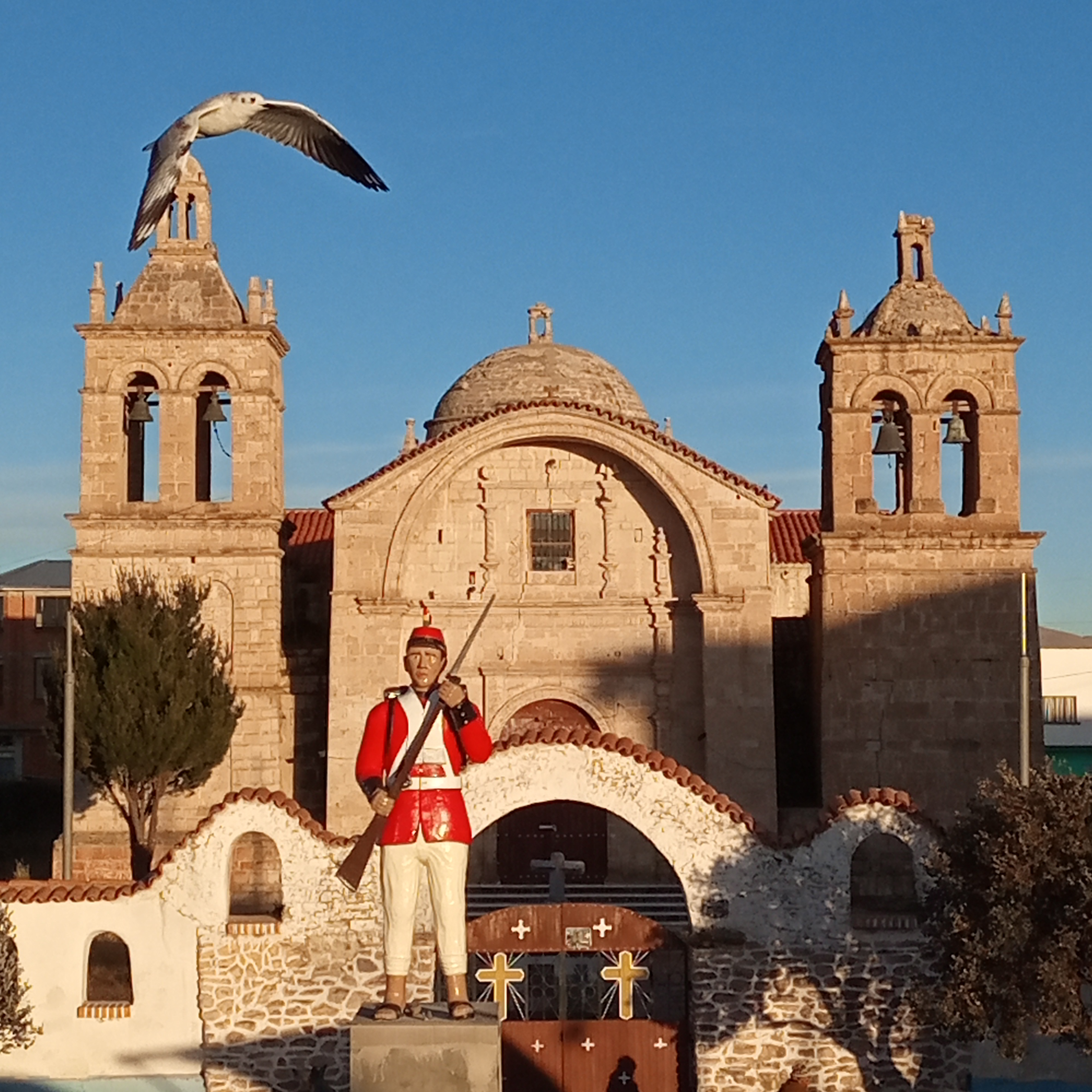
- Temple of Santiago de Machaca

- Location within Bolivia
- Coordinates: 17°04′S 69°12′W
- Country: Bolivia
- Department: La Paz Department
- Province: José Manuel Pando Province
- Municipality: Santiago de Machaca Municipality

Population (2001)
  - Total: 819
- Time zone: UTC-4 (BOT)

Santiago de Machaca is a location in the La Paz Department in Bolivia. It is the seat of the Santiago de Machaca Municipality, the first municipal section of the José Manuel Pando Province, and it is also the seat of the province.

== Climate ==
Climate data for Santiago de Machaca, elevation 3,980 m (13,060 ft)
Month	Jan	Feb	Mar	Apr	May	Jun	Jul	Aug	Sep	Oct	Nov	Dec	Year
Mean daily maximum °C (°F)	17.9 (64.2)	17.5 (63.5)	17.4 (63.3)	17.0 (62.6)	16.4 (61.5)	15.1 (59.2)	15.3 (59.5)	16.9 (62.4)	17.7 (63.9)	19.1 (66.4)	19.7 (67.5)	19.3 (66.7)	17.4 (63.4)
Daily mean °C (°F)	10.6 (51.1)	9.9 (49.8)	9.8 (49.6)	7.6 (45.7)	5.5 (41.9)	3.7 (38.7)	3.1 (37.6)	5.0 (41.0)	6.4 (43.5)	8.4 (47.1)	9.7 (49.5)	10.6 (51.1)	7.5 (45.6)
Mean daily minimum °C (°F)	3.4 (38.1)	2.4 (36.3)	2.3 (36.1)	−1.9 (28.6)	−5.3 (22.5)	−7.7 (18.1)	−8.7 (16.3)	−6.9 (19.6)	−5.0 (23.0)	−2.3 (27.9)	−0.9 (30.4)	1.5 (34.7)	−2.4 (27.6)
Average precipitation mm (inches)	131 (5.2)	116 (4.6)	83 (3.3)	20 (0.8)	1 (0.0)	4 (0.2)	1 (0.0)	3 (0.1)	9 (0.4)	8 (0.3)	37 (1.5)	65 (2.6)	478 (19)
Average relative humidity (%)	58	58	61	55	53	50	50	46	46	48	46	51	52
Source: Plataforma digital única del Estado Peruano
