= San Pedro Curahuara de Carangas =

San Pedro Curahuara
- Town
- Location within Bolivia
- Coordinates: 17°39′S 68°3′W
- Country: Bolivia
- Department: La Paz Department
- Province: Gualberto Villarroel Province
- Municipality: San Pedro de Curahuara Municipality

Government
  - Mayor: Justino Cruz Choque
- Elevation: 12,785 ft (3,897 m)

Population (2001)
  - Total: 292
  - Ethnicities: Aymara
- Time zone: UTC-4 (BOT)

San Pedro Curahuara is a location in the La Paz Department in Bolivia, capital of the province of Gualberto Villarroel Province.
