= Khasani =

Coordinates: 16.2097°S 69.0847°W

- Town
- Interactive map of Khasani
- Country: Bolivia
- Department: La Paz Department
- Province: Manco Kapac Province
- Municipality: Copacabana Municipality
- Time zone: UTC-4 (BOT)

Khasani is a location in the La Paz Department, Bolivia.
