= Janq'u Uta =

Mountain in Bolivia

- Location within Bolivia

Highest point
- Elevation: 4,737 m (15,541 ft)
- Coordinates: 17°13′07″S 67°43′35″W

Geography
- Location: Bolivia; La Paz Department
- Parent range: Andes

Janq'u Uta (Aymara janq'u white, uta house, "white house", also spelled Jankho Uta) is a 4,737-metre-high (15,541 ft) mountain in the Bolivian Andes. It is located in the La Paz Department, Aroma Province, Sica Sica Municipality. Janq'u Uta lies southwest of Chuqi Sillani.
