= Chacarilla Municipality =

- Municipality
- Location within Bolivia
- Coordinates: 17.5°S 68.1667°W
- Country: Bolivia
- Department: La Paz Department
- Province: Gualberto Villarroel Province
- Seat: Chacarilla

Area
  - Total: 137 sq mi (354 km^{2})
- Elevation: 12,630 ft (3,850 m)

Population (2010)
  - Total: 1,981
  - Density: 14.5/sq mi (5.60/km^{2})
- Time zone: UTC-4 (BOT)

Chacarilla Municipality is the third municipal section of the Gualberto Villarroel Province in the La Paz Department, Bolivia. Its seat is Chacarilla. It had 23 inhabitants in 2001.

== Subdivision ==
The municipality is divided into three cantons:

- Chacarilla Canton - 394 inhabitants (2001)
- Puerto Aroma Canton - 205 inhabitants
  - Puerto Aroma
- Rosa Pata Canton - 964 inhabitants
