= Chacarilla Canton =

- Canton
- Country: Bolivia
- Department: La Paz Department
- Province: Gualberto Villarroel Province
- Municipality: Chacarilla Municipality
- Seat: Chacarilla

Government
  - Mayor: Tomas Blanco Flores (2007)
  - President: Vicente Blacnoc Flores (2007)

Population (2001)
  - Total: 394
- Time zone: UTC-4 (BOT)

Chacarilla Canton is a canton in the La Paz Department, Bolivia. Its seat is Chacarilla. The 2001 census counted 23 inhabitants.
