= Urqu Jawira (Aroma) =

- Location in Bolivia
- Etymology: Aymara

Location
- Country: Bolivia
- Region: La Paz Department, Aroma Province

Urqu Jawira (Aymara urqu male, jawira river, "male river", Hispanicized spellings Orkhojahuira, Orkho Jahuira) is a Bolivian river in the La Paz Department, Aroma Province, Calamarca Municipality.

== See also ==
- Jach'a Quta
- List of rivers of Bolivia
