= Arapata =

- Town

- Location within Bolivia
- Coordinates: 16°16′S 67°39′W
- Country: Bolivia
- Department: La Paz Department
- Province: Nor Yungas Province
- Municipality: Coripata Municipality

Population (2001)
  - Total: 1,557
- Time zone: UTC-4 (BOT)

Arapata is a small town in Bolivia. In 2009 it had an estimated population of 1,924.
