= Cañaviri =

Coordinates: 17.3328°S 68.0333°W

- Town
- Interactive map of Cañaviri
- Country: Bolivia
- Time zone: UTC-4 (BOT)

Cañaviri is a small town in Bolivia. In 2010 it had an estimated population of 992.

== Location and Nearby Places ==
Cañaviri is the central place of Cantón Cañaviri and most populous town in the county (Bolivian: Municipio) Umala in Aroma Province. Situated at an altitude of 3852 m at the northern end of the Serrania de Huayllamarca, an approximately 100 kilometer long ridge, which is on the Altiplano in the west of the city of Oruro extends into northwest-southeast direction.

== Geography ==
Cañaviri located on the Bolivian high plateau between the Andes mountain ranges of the Cordillera Occidental in the west and the Cordillera Central in the east. The climate is the typical time of day climate of the equatorial high mountains, the precipitate at the mean temperature fluctuations during the day than during the year. The mean average temperature of the region is about 7 °C (see climate Patacamaya diagram), the average monthly temperatures vary only slightly between 4 °C in June / July and 9 °C in the November / December. The annual rainfall is 460 mm, the monthly precipitation totals of between less than 10 mm from May to August and at 110 mm in January.

== Transport System ==
Cañaviri is located eight kilometers north of Umala, the administrative center of the Municipalities, and 120 kilometers by road from La Paz, the capital of the departments. From La Paz from the asphalt leads Highway Route 2 about 13 km from El Alto, from there to Route 1 south as 91 km asphalt road to Patacamaya, then Route 4 to the southwest 16 km to Cañaviri. From there, the leads Ruta 4 continue west past the highest mountain in Bolivia, the Sajama, reaching Tambo Quemado on the Chilean border after 173 km.
