= Malla Jaqhi =

Mountain in Bolivia

- Location within Bolivia

Highest point
- Elevation: 4,520 m (14,830 ft)
- Coordinates: 17°14′03″S 67°46′31″W

Geography
- Location: Bolivia; La Paz Department
- Parent range: Andes

Malla Jaqhi (Aymara malla lead, jaqhi precipice, cliff, "lead cliff", also spelled Malla Jakke) is a mountain in the Bolivian Andes which reaches a height of approximately 4,520 m (14,830 ft). It is located in the La Paz Department, Aroma Province, Sica Sica Municipality. Malla Jaqhi lies southwest of Llallawa.

Malla Jaqhi is also the name of an intermittent stream which originates east of the mountain. Its waters flow to the southwest.
