= Wila Qullu (La Paz) =

Mountain in Bolivia

- Location within Bolivia

Highest point
- Elevation: 4,932 m (16,181 ft)
- Coordinates: 17°17′43″S 69°23′56″W

Geography
- Location: Bolivia, La Paz Department; José Manuel Pando Province
- Parent range: Andes

Wila Qullu (Aymara wila blood, blood-red, qullu mountain, "red mountain", also spelled Wila Kkollu) is a 4,932-metre-high (16,181 ft) mountain in the Andes of Bolivia. It is situated in the La Paz Department, José Manuel Pando Province, Catacora Municipality. Wila Qullu lies north of the mountain Apachita, north-east of Chuqiwa Qullu (Chuquivakkollu) and south-east of Laram Q'awa.
