= Wari Kunka =

Mountain in Bolivia

- Location within Bolivia

Highest point
- Elevation: 5,120 m (16,800 ft)
- Coordinates: 17°13′08″S 69°24′32″W

Geography
- Location: Bolivia, La Paz Department; José Manuel Pando Province
- Parent range: Andes

Wari Kunka (Aymara wari vicuña, kunka throat, "vicuña throat", wari kunka a medical plant (Thamnolia vermicularis), Hispanicized spelling Huaricunca) is a 5,120-metre-high (16,798 ft) mountain in the Andes of Bolivia. It is situated in the La Paz Department, José Manuel Pando Province, at the border of the Catacora Municipality and the Santiago de Machaca Municipality. Wari Kunka lies southeast of Patapatani, northeast of Sinijawi and southeast of Jisk'a Wari Kunka ("little Wari Kunka"). An intermittent stream named Salla Uma ("cliff water", Sallahuma) originates southwest of the mountain. It flows to the west where it meets Jaruma River as a left tributary.
