= Sica Sica Municipality =

Sica Sica Sika Sika
- Municipality
- Location within Bolivia
- Coordinates: 17°20′S 67°30′W
- Country: Bolivia
- Department: La Paz Department
- Province: Aroma Province
- Seat: Sica Sica

Population (2001)
  - Total: 26,818
- Time zone: UTC-4 (BOT)

Sica Sica Municipality (Aymara: Sika Sika) is the first municipal section of the Aroma Province in the La Paz Department, Bolivia. Its seat is Sica Sica.

== Geography ==
Some of the highest mountains of the municipality are listed below:

- Chuqi Sillani
- Janq'u Jaqhi
- Janq'u Uta
- Jach'a Jawira
- Llallawa
- Lluxita Punta
- Malla Jaqhi
- Millu Jaqhi
- Qhapaqa
- Tanka Tanka
- Wila Pukara
- Wisk'achani

== See also ==
- Jach'a Jawira
