= Tanka Tanka (La Paz) =

Mountain in Bolivia

- Location within Bolivia

Highest point
- Elevation: 4,643 m (15,233 ft)
- Coordinates: 17°15′41″S 67°41′27″W

Geography
- Location: Bolivia; La Paz Department
- Parent range: Andes

Tanka Tanka (Aymara tanka hat or biretta, the reduplication indicates that there is a group of something, "many hats (or birettas)") is a 4,643-metre-high (15,233 ft) mountain in the Bolivian Andes. It is located in the La Paz Department, Aroma Province, Sica Sica Municipality.
