= Jach'a Jawira (Aroma) =

- Etymology: Aymara

Location
- Country: Bolivia
- Region: La Paz Department, Aroma Province

Physical characteristics
- Source
  - location: Patacamaya Municipality
  - coordinates: 17°10′43″S 67°49′33″W
- Mouth
  - location: Patacamaya Municipality, Sica Sica Municipality
  - coordinates: 17°21′55″S 67°51′03″W

The Jach'a Jawira (Aymara jach'a big, great, jawira river, "big river", also spelled Jachcha Jahuira) which upstream is named Wanun Jawira and downstream successively is called Sasari and Qullpa Jawira is a river in the Aroma Province in the La Paz Department of Bolivia.

Known as Wanun Jawira ("the river with dung", also spelled Wanun Jahuira) it originates northeast of Chullunkäni in the Patacamaya Municipality. After the confluence with other intermittent streams southeast of Chullunkhäni it receives the name Jach'a Jawira. Its direction is mainly to the southwest. South of the village of Pusuta it is named Sasari. In the Sica Sica Municipality west of Chijmuni (Chhijmuni) the river turns to the southeast. Now it is called Qullpa Jawira ("salpeter river", Kollpajahuira). The river seeps away south of Chijmuni at the border of the municipalities of Patacamaya and Sica Sica.
