= Llallawa (Bolivia) =

Mountain in Bolivia

- Location within Bolivia

Highest point
- Elevation: 4,530 m (14,860 ft)
- Coordinates: 17°18′03″S 69°16′30″W

Geography
- Location: Bolivia, La Paz Department; José Manuel Pando Province
- Parent range: Andes

Llallawa (Aymara for a monstrous potato (like two potatoes) or animal, Hispanicized spelling Llallahua) is a 4,530-metre-high (14,862 ft) mountain in the Andes of Bolivia. It is situated in the La Paz Department, José Manuel Pando Province, Santiago de Machaca Municipality. Llallawa lies north of Payrumani and northeast of Llallawa Nasa (Llallaguanasa). It is situated at one of the affluents of the Payrumani River.
