= Llallawa (Sica Sica) =

Mountain in Bolivia

- Location within Bolivia

Highest point
- Elevation: 4,653 m (15,266 ft)
- Coordinates: 17°13′55″S 67°45′39″W

Geography
- Location: Bolivia; La Paz Department
- Parent range: Andes

Llallawa (Aymara for a monstrous potato (like two potatoes) or animal, also named Llallagua Grande) is a 4,653-metre-high (15,266 ft) mountain in the Bolivian Andes. It is located in the La Paz Department, Aroma Province, Sica Sica Municipality. The two peaks of Llallawa lie northeast of Malla Jaqhi. The lower one (Llallagua Chico) is northwest of the main peak at 17°13′31″S 67°45′59″W.
