= Qillqatiri =

Mountain in Bolivia

- Location within Bolivia

Highest point
- Elevation: 4,792 m (15,722 ft)
- Coordinates: 17°02′47″S 68°19′12″W

Geography
- Location: Bolivia; La Paz Department
- Parent range: Andes

Qillqatiri (Aymara, also spelled Kelkatiri, Khellkhatiri) is a 4,792-metre-high (15,722 ft) mountain in Bolivia. It is located in the La Paz Department, Aroma Province, Colquencha Municipality.

The Jach'a Jawira (Aymara for "big river") which later is named Colorado, Mani, then Colorado again and finally Katari originates southwest of the mountain. It empties into Wiñaymarka Lake, the southern part of Lake Titicaca.
