= Ayo Ayo =

- Town
- Location within Bolivia
- Coordinates: 17°06′S 68°0′W
- Country: Bolivia
- Department: La Paz Department
- Province: Aroma Province
- Municipality: Ayo Ayo Municipality

Population (2001)
  - Total: 647
- Time zone: UTC-4 (BOT)
- Climate: BSk

Ayo Ayo is a location in the La Paz Department in Bolivia. It is the seat of the Ayo Ayo Municipality, the third municipal section of the Aroma Province.

== Climate ==
Climate data for Ayo Ayo, elevation 3,856 m (12,651 ft)
Month	Jan	Feb	Mar	Apr	May	Jun	Jul	Aug	Sep	Oct	Nov	Dec	Year
Mean daily maximum °C (°F)	17.3 (63.1)	17.3 (63.1)	17.3 (63.1)	17.7 (63.9)	17.0 (62.6)	15.8 (60.4)	15.4 (59.7)	16.4 (61.5)	16.9 (62.4)	18.7 (65.7)	19.1 (66.4)	18.5 (65.3)	17.3 (63.1)
Daily mean °C (°F)	10.5 (50.9)	10.5 (50.9)	10.0 (50.0)	8.4 (47.1)	5.8 (42.4)	3.8 (38.8)	3.4 (38.1)	5.0 (41.0)	7.1 (44.8)	9.1 (48.4)	10.2 (50.4)	10.7 (51.3)	7.9 (46.2)
Mean daily minimum °C (°F)	3.9 (39.0)	3.6 (38.5)	2.6 (36.7)	−0.9 (30.4)	−5.4 (22.3)	−8.3 (17.1)	−8.0 (17.6)	−6.5 (20.3)	−2.5 (27.5)	−0.8 (30.6)	1.3 (34.3)	2.9 (37.2)	−1.5 (29.3)
Average precipitation mm (inches)	100 (3.9)	64 (2.5)	54 (2.1)	21 (0.8)	7 (0.3)	3 (0.1)	5 (0.2)	11 (0.4)	25 (1.0)	25 (1.0)	27 (1.1)	61 (2.4)	403 (15.8)
Source: Plataforma digital única del Estado Peruano
