= Rosmery Mollo =

Bolivian activist

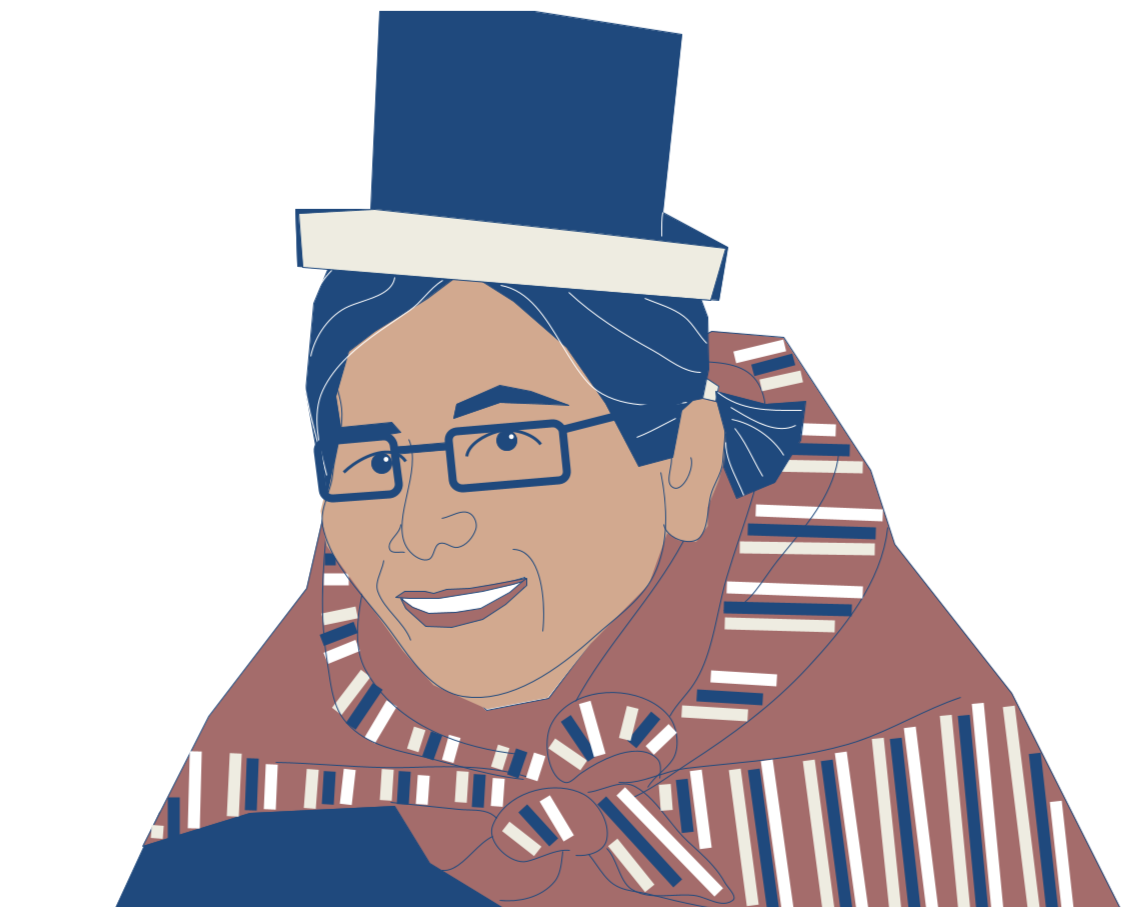

Rosmery Mollo Mamani is an Aymara activist and nurse from Bolivia, who works in the field of sexual and reproductive health. In 2013 her work was recognised with a BBC 100 Women award.

== Career ==
Mollo is an Aymara sexual and reproductive health nurse and educator. She studied nursing at Universidad Católica Boliviana in La Paz. Her parents encouraged her to become a nurse, funding her education, and her mother looked after Mollo's child while she was away. She subsequently worked on the Warmi public health project, based in Calamarca, which aimed to reduce maternal mortality for indigenous women. During the ten years of Mollo's leadership, the project expanded and included the installation of greenhouses, enabling women to grow more food for their families.

== Awards and recognition ==
- In 2008 her work was recognised by the Pan American Health Organisation.
- In 2013 Mollo was recognised with a BBC 100 Women award.
