= Laram Q'awa (Pando) =

Mountain in Bolivia

- Location within Bolivia

Highest point
- Elevation: 4,988 m (16,365 ft)
- Coordinates: 17°17′03″S 69°24′25″W

Geography
- Location: Bolivia, La Paz Department; José Manuel Pando Province
- Parent range: Andes

Laram Q'awa (Aymara larama blue, q'awa little river, ditch, crevice, fissure, gap in the earth, "blue brook" or "blue ravine", also spelled Laramkahua) is a 4,988-metre-high (16,365 ft) mountain in the Andes of Bolivia. It is situated in the La Paz Department, José Manuel Pando Province, Catacora Municipality. Laram Q'awa lies north-west of the mountains Apachita and Wila Qullu and north-east of Chuqiwa Qullu (Chuquivakkollu).
