= Colquencha Municipality =

- Municipality
- Location within Bolivia
- Coordinates: 16°56′S 68°15′W
- Country: Bolivia
- Department: La Paz Department
- Province: Aroma Province
- Seat: Colquencha

Population (2001)
  - Total: 8,020
- Time zone: UTC-4 (BOT)

Colquencha Municipality is the sixth municipal section of the Aroma Province in the La Paz Department, Bolivia. Its seat is Colquencha.

== See also ==
- Chuqi Q'awa
- Qillqatiri
- Q'ara Willk'i
