= Marquirivi =

Coordinates: 17°57′S 67°58′W

- Town
- Interactive map of Marquirivi
- Country: Bolivia
- Time zone: UTC-4 (BOT)

Marquirivi is a small town in Bolivia. In 2014, the town received adequate plumbing in the summer of 2014, thanks to an organization known as, "Club Tunari Cochabamba with Engineers in Action."
