= Patacamaya =

Patacamaya Patak Amaya
- City
- Location in Bolivia
- Coordinates: 17°14′S 67°55′W
- Country: Bolivia
- Department: La Paz Department
- Province: Aroma Province
- Municipality: Patacamaya Municipality
- Canton: Patacamaya Canton

Population (2012)
  - Total: 8,414
- Time zone: UTC-4 (BOT)
- Climate: BSk

Patacamaya or Patak Amaya (Aymara) is a city in Bolivia, situated in the La Paz Department. It is the seat of the Patacamaya Municipality, the fifth municipal section of the Aroma Province. Patacamaya lies in the Altiplano, approximately 100 km southeast of La Paz. It contains the intersection between 'Carretera 1' which goes from La Paz to Oruro, as well as Cochabamba, and the 'Carretera Arica-La Paz'. The 'Tambo Quemado' highway is one of the most important international roads that travels through Bolivia.

== Name ==
The name of the city originated from a war that occurred in the 1920s between Aymaras and Quechuas. The word Patakamaya is a conglomeration of two words; pataka meaning "100" and amaya meaning "dead", referring to the casualties of the war.

== Observatory ==
Situated 3789 meters above sea level, Patacamaya is a prime location for astronomical observation. Its lightly populated area keeps light pollution at a minimum, making it an ideal place for an observatory. The 'Observatorio de Patacamaya' was built in 1973 with help of the Soviets. However, since 1983, the UMSA (Universidad Mayor de San Andres) has been maintaining the observatory.

The telescope in the observatory is a Celestron telescope of 40 cm diameter. The observatory also contains two astro-cameras an AFU-75, and CCD SBIG ST-5 among other astronomical equipment. This equipment has been extremely useful for students researching such events as the passing of Halley's Comet and the Shoemaker Levy 9 Comet.

== Economy ==
Apart from the Observatory, Patacamaya has some other smaller sources of income including a weekly Sunday fair. Agriculture in the area consists mainly of potatoes.

Patacamaya is also home to the military unit 'Batallon de Tanques I Calama.'

== Climate ==
Climate data for Patacamaya, elevation 3,793 m (12,444 ft)
Month	Jan	Feb	Mar	Apr	May	Jun	Jul	Aug	Sep	Oct	Nov	Dec	Year
Mean daily maximum °C (°F)	19.2 (66.6)	19.1 (66.4)	19.2 (66.6)	19.2 (66.6)	17.8 (64.0)	16.5 (61.7)	16.3 (61.3)	17.4 (63.3)	18.5 (65.3)	20.4 (68.7)	21.1 (70.0)	20.4 (68.7)	18.8 (65.8)
Daily mean °C (°F)	12.2 (54.0)	12.0 (53.6)	11.8 (53.2)	10.5 (50.9)	7.5 (45.5)	5.5 (41.9)	5.6 (42.1)	7.2 (45.0)	9.2 (48.6)	11.1 (52.0)	12.1 (53.8)	12.6 (54.7)	9.8 (49.6)
Mean daily minimum °C (°F)	5.3 (41.5)	4.9 (40.8)	4.3 (39.7)	1.7 (35.1)	−2.7 (27.1)	−5.4 (22.3)	−5.1 (22.8)	−3.1 (26.4)	−0.1 (31.8)	1.9 (35.4)	3.2 (37.8)	4.7 (40.5)	0.8 (33.4)
Average precipitation mm (inches)	97.0 (3.82)	73.0 (2.87)	51.6 (2.03)	17.3 (0.68)	6.5 (0.26)	4.4 (0.17)	3.9 (0.15)	7.7 (0.30)	24.2 (0.95)	19.8 (0.78)	32.5 (1.28)	66.3 (2.61)	404.2 (15.9)
Average precipitation days	16.0	13.3	11.2	4.8	1.9	1.0	1.2	1.9	4.9	5.1	6.6	11.8	79.7
Average relative humidity (%)	67.8	67.3	65.7	59.2	50.0	50.3	50.8	50.8	53.3	52.8	53.5	59.5	56.8
Source: Servicio Nacional de Meteorología e Hidrología de Bolivia
