= Palcoco =

Coordinates: 16°18′S 68°27′W

- Town
- Interactive map of Palcoco
- Country: Bolivia
- Time zone: UTC-4 (BOT)

Palcoco is a small town in Bolivia.
