= Puerto Guaqui =

Coordinates: 16.5942°S 68.8517°W

- Town
- Interactive map of Puerto Guaqui
- Country: Bolivia
- Time zone: UTC-4 (BOT)

Puerto Guaqui is a small town in Bolivia.
