= Papel Pampa =

Coordinates: 17.8189°S 67.7686°W

- Town
- Interactive map of Papel Pampa
- Country: Bolivia
- Department: La Paz Department
- Time zone: UTC-4 (BOT)

Papel Pampa is a town in the La Paz Department, Bolivia.
