= San Antonio de Senkata =

Coordinates: 16.7972°S 68.1792°W

- Town
- Interactive map of San Antonio de Senkata
- Country: Bolivia
- Time zone: UTC-4 (BOT)

San Antonio de Senkata is a small town in Bolivia.
