= Sinijawi =

Mountain in Bolivia

- Location within Bolivia

Highest point
- Elevation: 5,068 m (16,627 ft)
- Coordinates: 17°14′05″S 69°25′21″W

Geography
- Location: Bolivia, La Paz Department; José Manuel Pando Province
- Parent range: Andes

Sinijawi (Aymara sinija marsh, -wi a suffix to indicate a place, "a place of marsh", also spelled Sinejavi) is a 5,068-metre-high (16,627 ft) mountain in the Andes of Bolivia. It is located in the La Paz Department, José Manuel Pando Province, Catacora Municipality. Sinijawi lies southwest of Wari Kunka. An intermittent stream named Salla Uma ("cliff water", Sallahuma) originates north of the mountain. It flows to the west where it meets Jaruma River as a left tributary.
