= José Manuel Pando Province =

José Manuel Pando
- Province
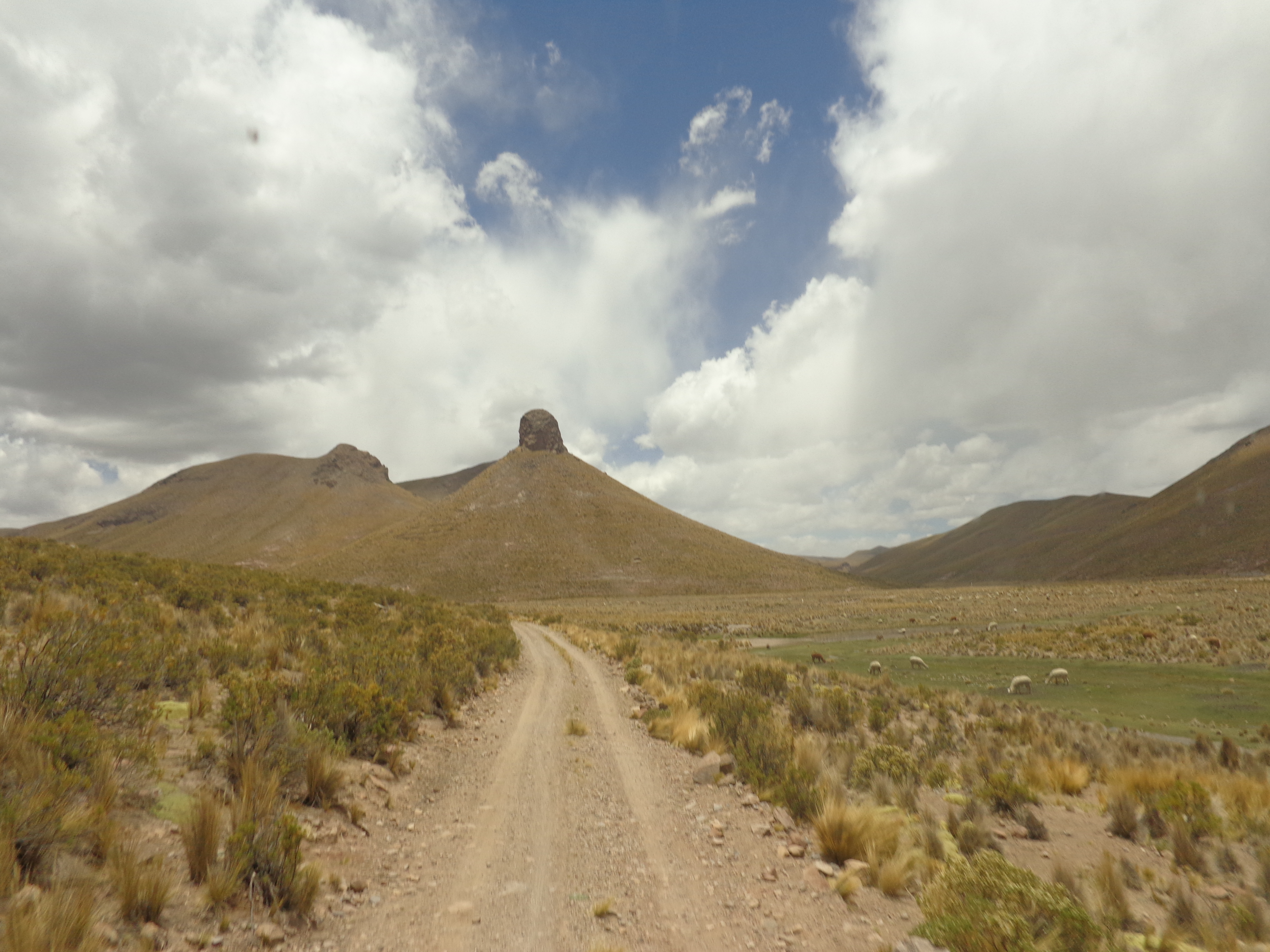
- Nuñu Qullu ("breast mountain") in the Santiago de Machaca Municipality

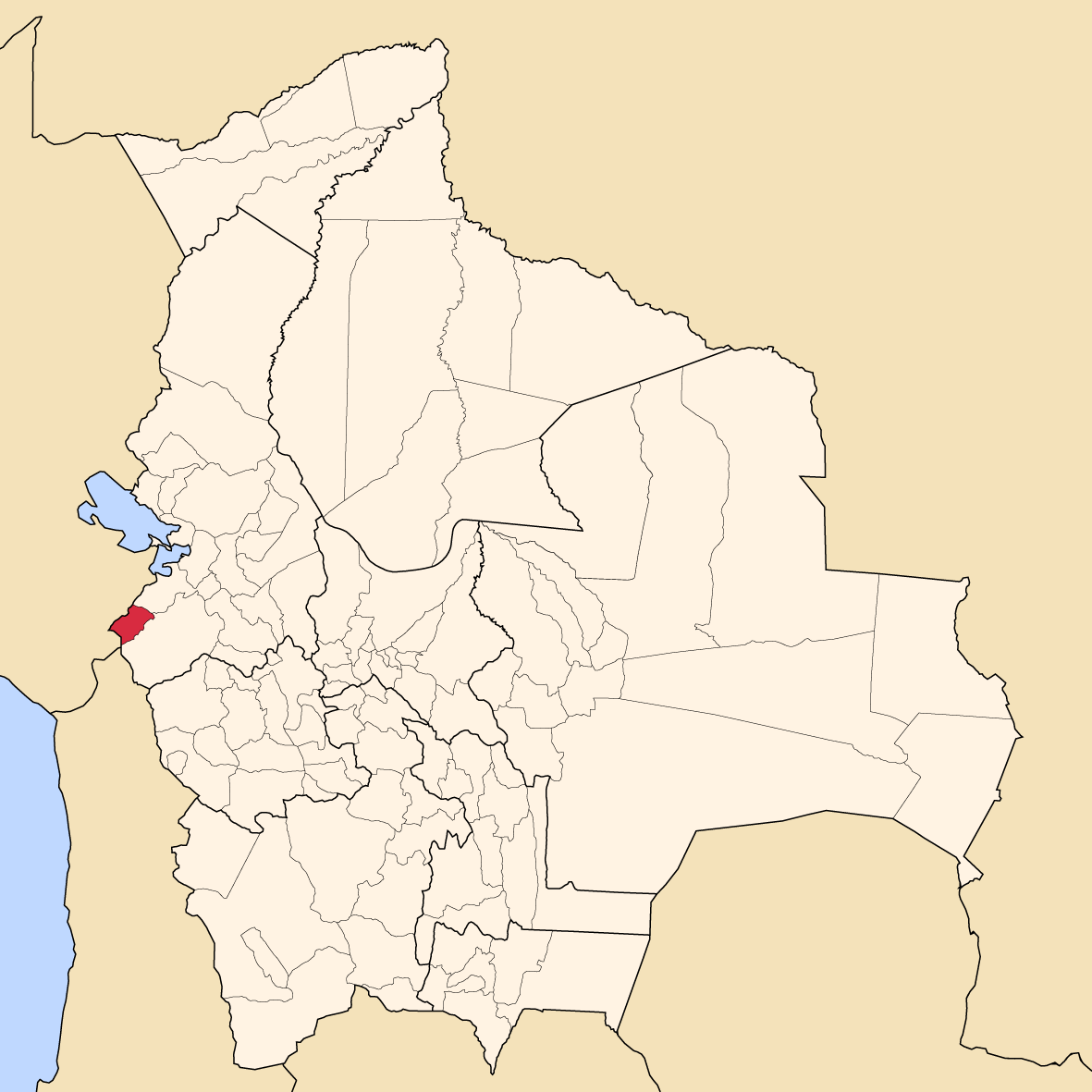
- Location of José Manuel Pando Province within Bolivia

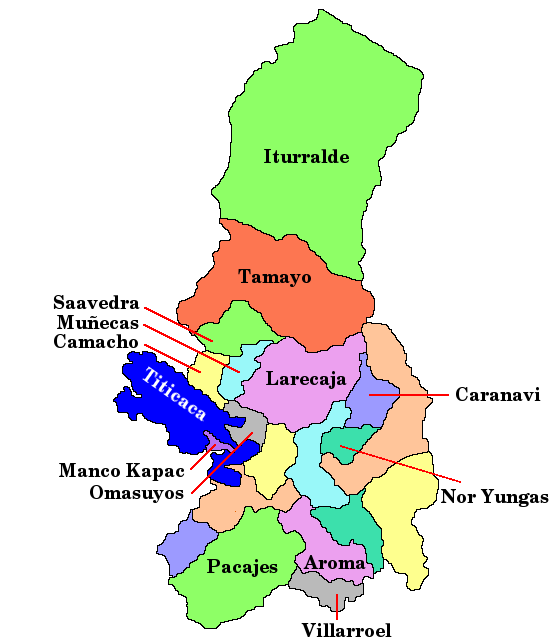
- Provinces of the La Paz Department
- Coordinates: 17°10′0″S 69°20′0″W
- Country: Bolivia
- Department: La Paz Department
- Municipalities: 2
- Founded: April 22, 1986
- Capital: Santiago de Machaca

Area
  - Total: 1,976 km^{2} (763 sq mi)
- Elevation: 3,893 m (12,772 ft)

Population (2024 census)
  - Total: 12,092
  - Density: 6.119/km^{2} (15.85/sq mi)
  - Ethnicities: Aymara
- Time zone: UTC-4 (BOT)
- Website: Official website

José Manuel Pando is a province in the La Paz Department in Bolivia. It was founded on April 22, 1986, during the presidency of Víctor Paz Estenssoro. The province was named after José Manuel Pando (1848–1917) who was the president of Bolivia from 1899 till 1904. Its capital is Santiago de Machaca.

The province is situated in the western part of the Bolivian Altiplano, south of Lake Titicaca. To the west it is bordered by Peru, to the southeast by the Pacajes Province and to the northeast by the Ingavi Province.

== Geography ==
Some of the highest mountains of the province are listed below:

- Apachita
- Ch'alla Willk'i
- Ch'iyar Jaqhi
- Jach'a Qiñwa Qullu
- Janq'u Qullu
- Jichu Kunka
- Jisk'a Qiñwa Qullu
- Jisk'a Wari Kunka
- Katari
- Laram Q'awa
- Llallawa
- Misa Willk'i
- P'iq'iñ Q'ara
- Qiñwani
- Qiwñuyu
- Qutani
- Sinijawi
- Sirk'i volcano
- Tatitu Qullu
- Wari Kunka
- Wila Qullu
- Wila Willk'i

== Subdivision ==
The province is divided into two municipalities which are further subdivided into cantons.

Municipality	Inhabitants (2001)	Seat	Inhabitants (2001)
Santiago de Machaca Municipality	4,402	Santiago de Machaca	819
Catacora Municipality	1,735	Catacora	529

== See also ==
- Parina Quta
- Thujsa Jawira
