= Pasto Pata =

- Town
- Location within Bolivia
- Coordinates: 16°18′S 67°26′W
- Country: Bolivia
- Elevation: 1,693 m (5,554 ft)

Population
  - Total: 775
- Time zone: UTC-4 (BOT)

Pasto Pata is a small town in Bolivia.
