= Sirk'i (La Paz) =

- Location within Bolivia

Highest point
- Elevation: 5,072 m (16,640 ft)
- Coordinates: 17°20′35″S 69°21′47″W

Geography
- Location: Bolivia, La Paz Department; José Manuel Pando Province
- Parent range: Andes

Sirk'i (Aymara for wart, also spelled Cerke, Cirque, Serke, Serkhe, Sirqui) is a volcano in the Andes of Bolivia, about 5,072 metres (16,640 ft) high. It is situated in the La Paz Department, José Manuel Pando Province, Catacora Municipality, Payrumani Canton, north of the Mawri River and near the borders to Chile and Peru.

== See also ==
- T'ula Qullu
