= Gualberto Villarroel Province =

Gualberto Villarroel
- Province
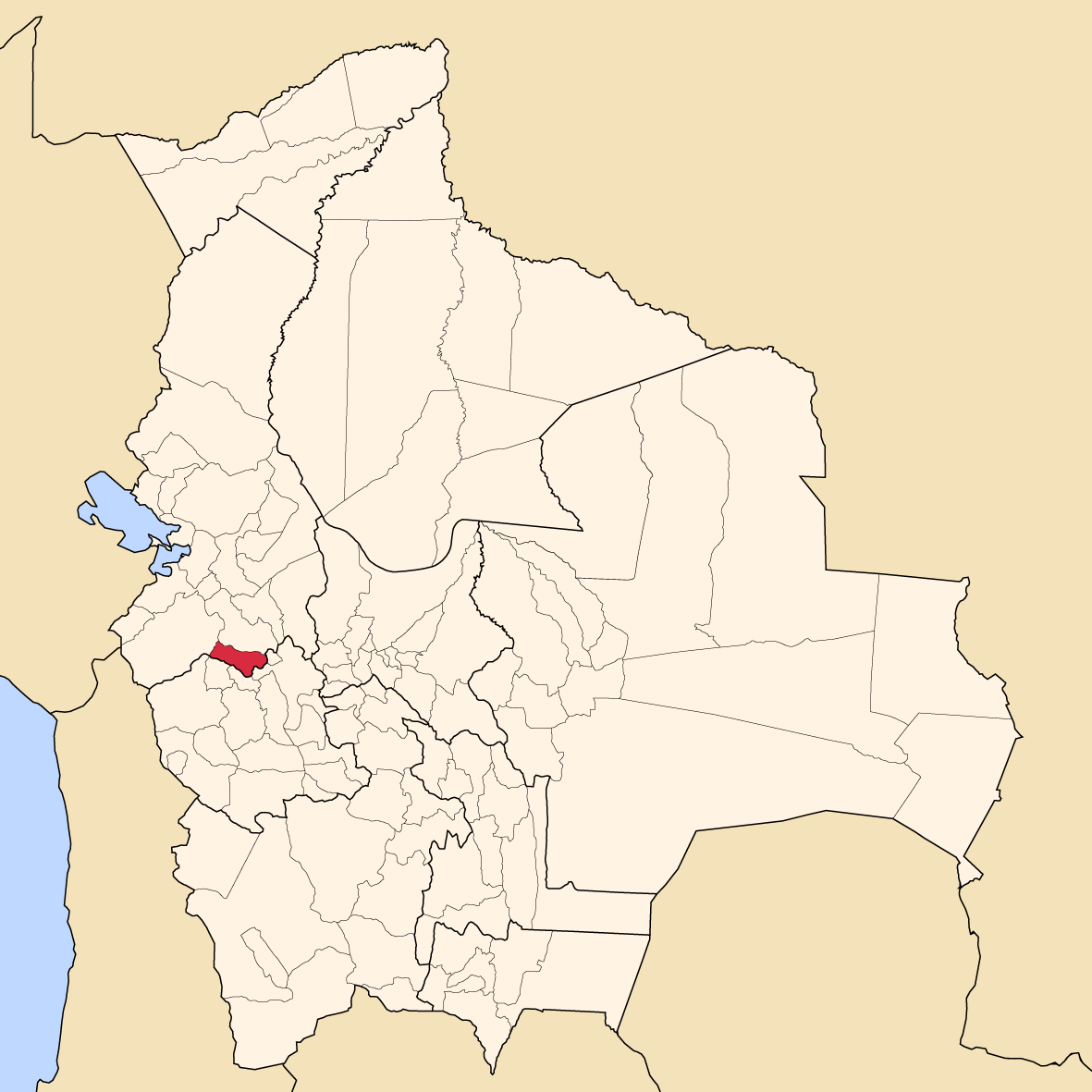
- Location of Gualberto Villarroel Province within Bolivia

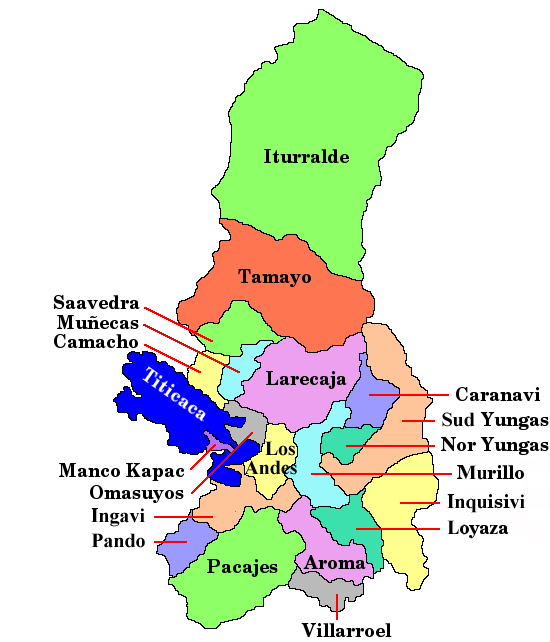
- Provinces of the La Paz Department
- Coordinates: 17°40′0″S 67°53′0″W
- Country: Bolivia
- Department: La Paz Department
- Municipalities: 3
- Capital: San Pedro de Curahuara

Area
  - Total: 1,935 km^{2} (747 sq mi)

Population (2024 census)
  - Total: 17,297
  - Density: 8.939/km^{2} (23.15/sq mi)
- Time zone: UTC-4 (BOT)

Gualberto Villarroel is a province in the La Paz Department, Bolivia. Its capital is San Pedro de Curahuara de Carangas.

== Subdivision ==
The province is divided into three municipalities which are further subdivided into cantons.

Section	Municipality	Seat
1st	San Pedro de Curahuara Municipality	San Pedro de Curahuara
2nd	Papel Pampa Municipality	Papel Pampa
3rd	Chacarilla Municipality	Chacarilla
