= Aroma Province =

Aroma
- Province
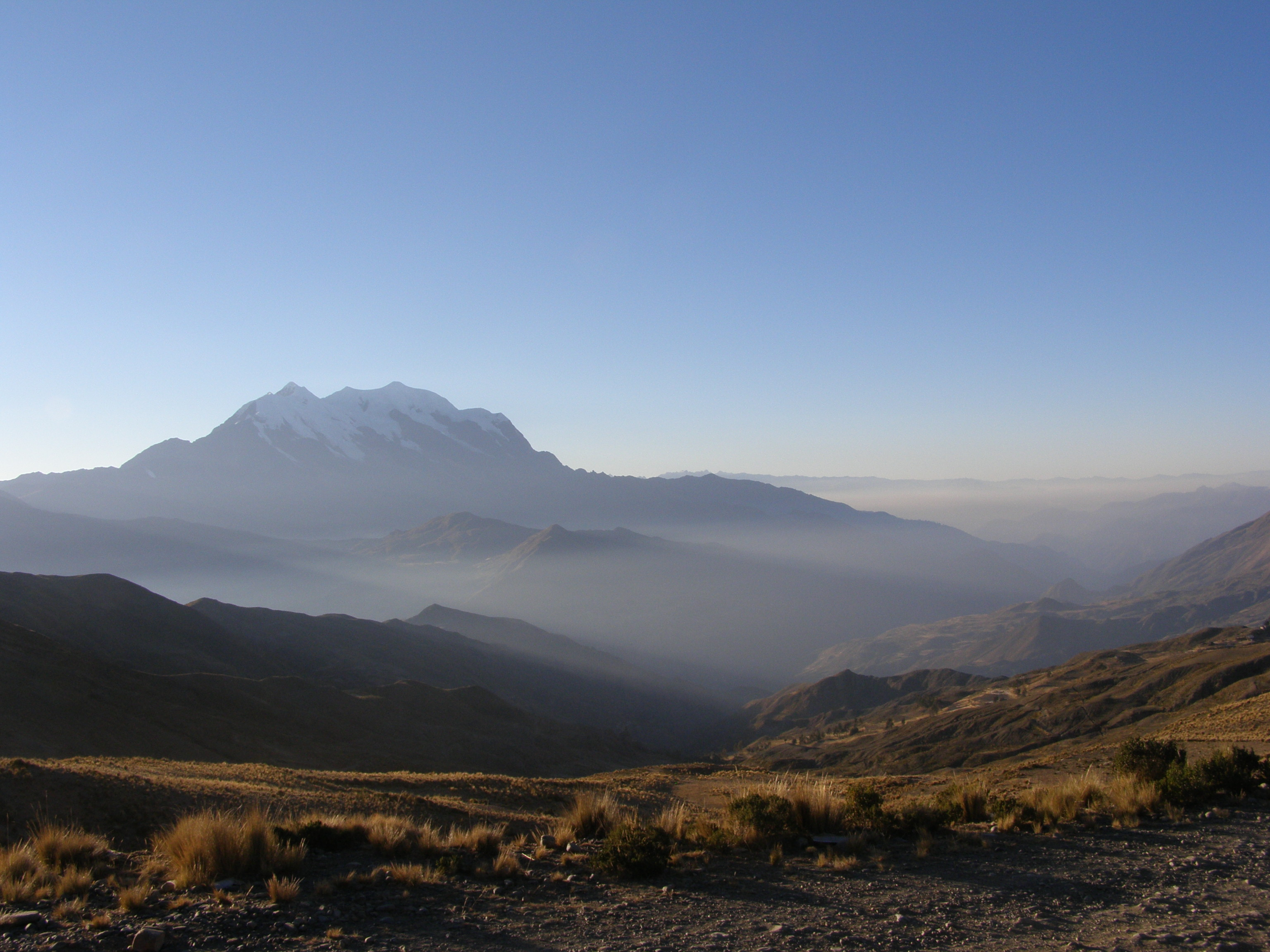
- Illimani, as seen from Collana

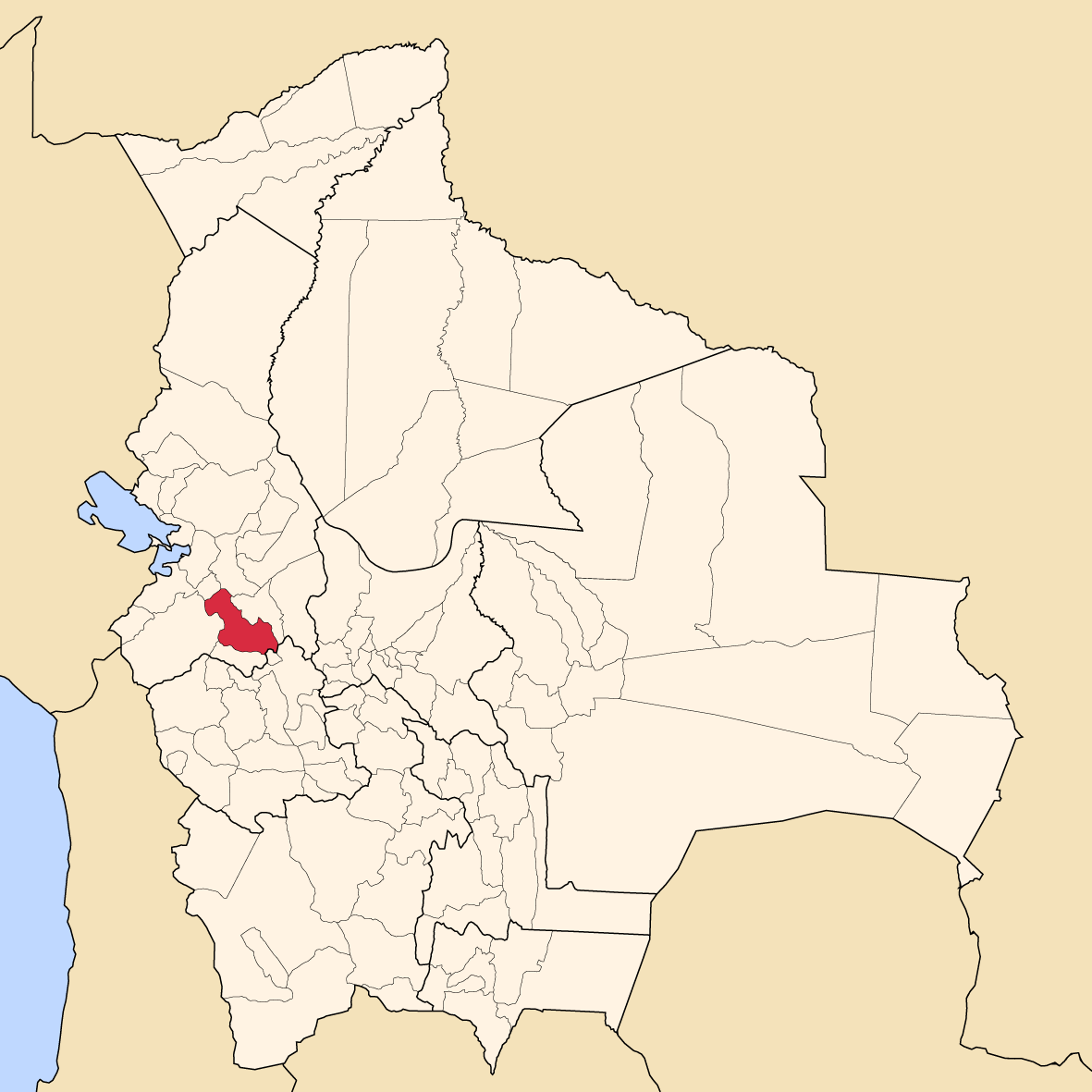
- Location of Aroma Province within Bolivia

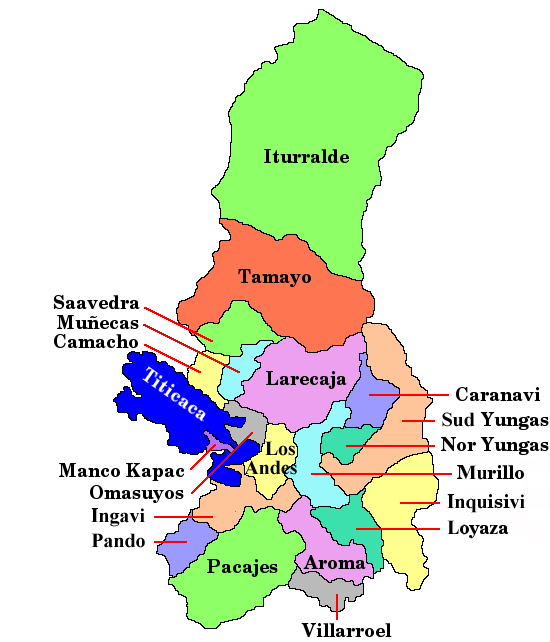
- Provinces of the La Paz Department
- Coordinates: 17°20′0″S 67°50′0″W
- Country: Bolivia
- Department: La Paz Department
- Capital: Sica Sica (Sika Sika)

Area
  - Total: 4,510 km^{2} (1,740 sq mi)

Population (2024 census)
  - Total: 112,015
  - Density: 24.8/km^{2} (64.3/sq mi)
  - Ethnicities: Aymara
- Time zone: UTC-4 (BOT)

Aroma is one of the twenty provinces of the Bolivian La Paz Department. It is situated in the southern parts of the department. Its seat is Sica Sica (Sika Sika).

== Location ==
Aroma province is located between 16° 43' and 17° 35' South and between 67° 22' and 68° 23' West. It extends over 120 km from north west to south east, and up to 55 km from north east to south west.

The province is situated on the Bolivian Altiplano south east of Lake Titicaca and borders Ingavi Province in the north west, Pacajes Province in the west, Gualberto Villarroel Province in the south, Oruro Department in the south east, Loayza Province in the east, and Pedro Domingo Murillo Province in the north.

== Geography ==
Some of the highest mountains of the province are listed below:

- Aya Wayku Apachita
- Chullunkhäni
- Chuqi Q'awa
- Chuqi Sillani
- Chuwalla
- Chuwallani
- Inka Pukara
- Janq'u Jaqhi
- Janq'u Uta
- Jaqhi Chata
- Llallawa (Patacamaya)
- Llallawa (Sica Sica)
- Lluqu Lluqu
- Lluxita Punta
- Malla Jaqhi
- Millu Jaqhi
- Misk'i Wat'a
- Puna Pata
- Qillqatiri
- Qhapaqa
- Q'ara Willk'i
- Sipi Sipi
- Tanka Tanka
- Titiri
- Wayrata Punta
- Wila Pukara
- Wisk'achani

== Population ==
The population of Aroma Province has increased by 80% over the recent two decades:

- 1992: 65,730 inhabitants (census)
- 2001: 86,480 inhabitants (census)
- 2012: 98,205 inhabitants (census)
- 2024: 112,015 inhabitants (census)

45.1% of the population are younger than 15 years old. (1992)

79.9% of the population speak Spanish, 93.9% speak Aymara, and 6.7% Quechua. (2001)

The literacy rate of the population of the province is 78.4%. (1992)

82.1% of the population have no access to electricity, 88.0% have no sanitary facilities. (1992)

69.2% of the population are Catholics, 25.5% are Protestants. (1992)

== Division ==
The province comprises seven municipios which are further subdivided into cantons.

Section	Municipality	Inhabitants (2001)	Seat	Inhabitants (2001)
1st	Sica Sica Municipality	26,818	Sica Sica	3,831
2nd	Umala Municipality	9,583	Umala	152
3rd	Ayo Ayo Municipality	6,981	Ayo Ayo	647
4th	Calamarca Municipality	12,112	Calamarca	943
5th	Patacamaya Municipality	20,039	Patacamaya	8,414
6th	Colquencha Municipality	8,020	Colquencha	2,352
7th	Collana Municipality	2,927	Collana	1,936

== Villages ==
- Lahuachaca

== See also ==
- Ch'alla Jawira
- Jach'a Jawira
- Kuntur Amaya
- Urqu Jawira
