= La Paz Department (Bolivia) =

Department of Bolivia

La Paz Departamento de La Paz (Spanish) Chuqiyapu jach'a suyu (Aymara)
- Department
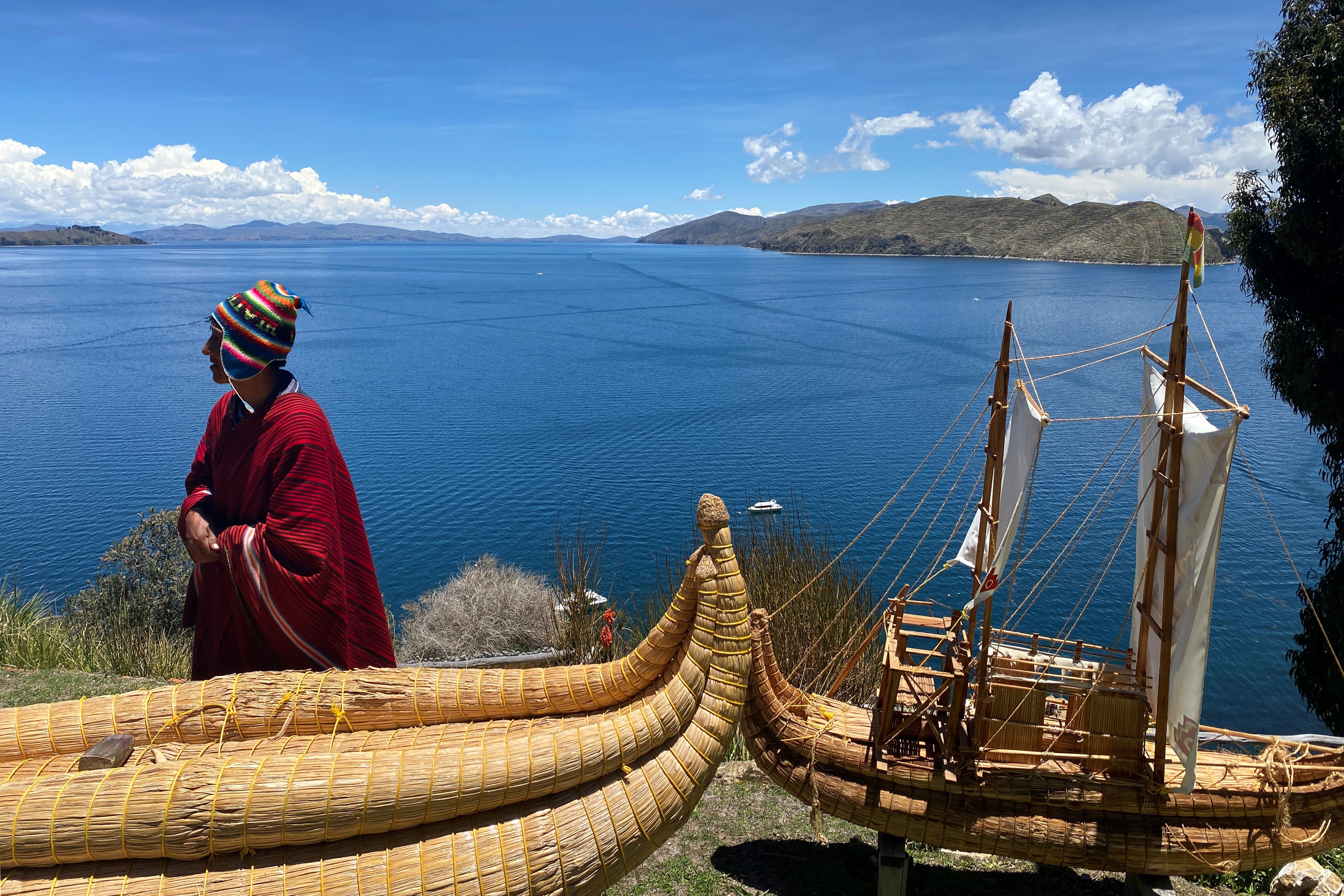
- Lake Titicaca in the Andes

- Flag Coat of arms

- Location of La Paz Department within Bolivia

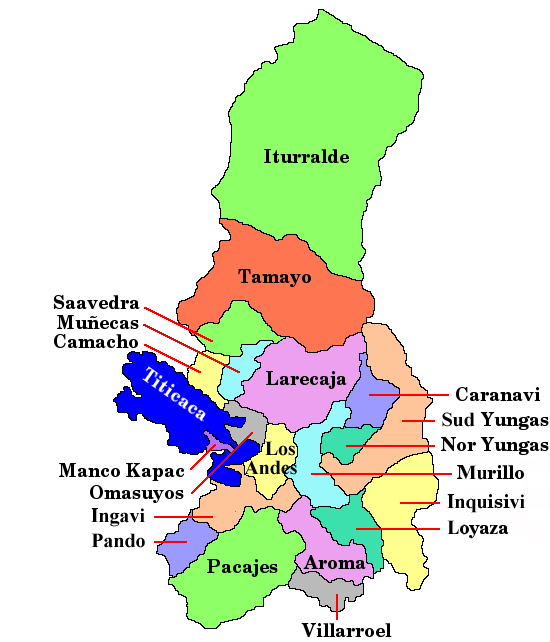
- Provinces of the La Paz Department
- Coordinates: 15°00′S 68°21′W
- Country: Bolivia
- Capital: La Paz

Government
  - Governor: Luis Revilla

Area
  - Total: 133,985 km^{2} (51,732 sq mi)

Population (2024 census)
  - Total: 3,022,566
  - Rank: 2nd
  - Density: 22.5590/km^{2} (58.4275/sq mi)
- Time zone: UTC−4 (BOT)
- ISO 3166 code: BO-L
- HDI (2019): 0.717 high · 6th of 9
- GDP (2023): in 2015 constant values
- Total: US$8.2 billion Int$ 19.3 billion (PPP)
- Per capita: US$2,700; Int$6,300 (PPP)
- Website: www.gobernacionlapaz.gob.bo

The La Paz Department of Bolivia comprises 133,985 square kilometres (51,732 sq mi) with a 2024 census population of 3,022,566 inhabitants. It is situated at the western border of Bolivia, sharing Lake Titicaca with the neighboring Peru. It contains the Cordillera Real mountain range, which reaches altitudes of 6.6 kilometers (22,000 ft). Northeast of the Cordillera Real are the Yungas, the steep eastern slopes of the Andes Mountains that make the transition to the Amazon River basin to the northeast. The capital of the department is the city of La Paz and is the administrative city and seat of government/national capital of Bolivia.

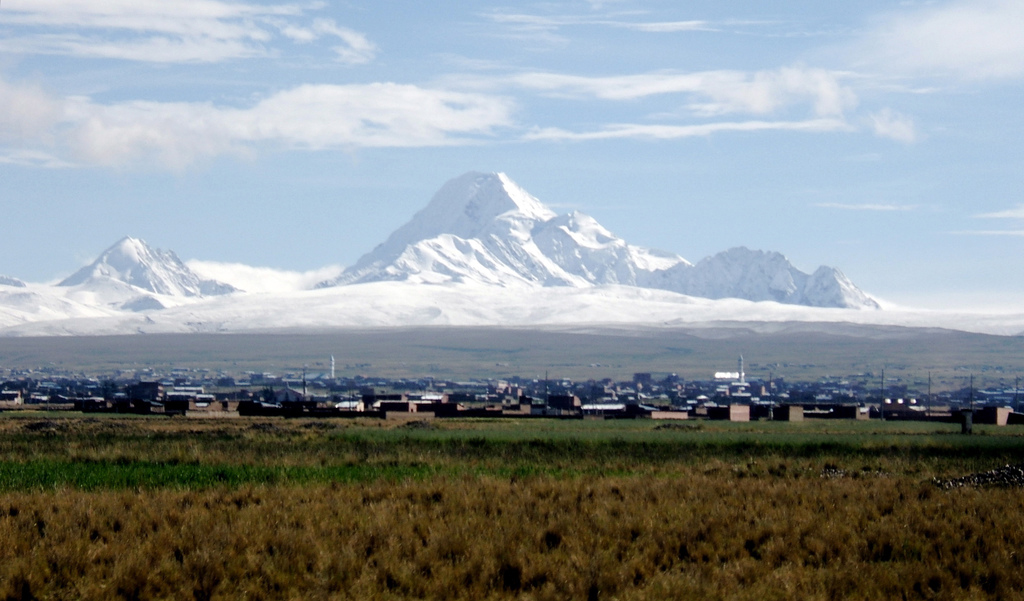
Huayna Potosí

== Provinces ==
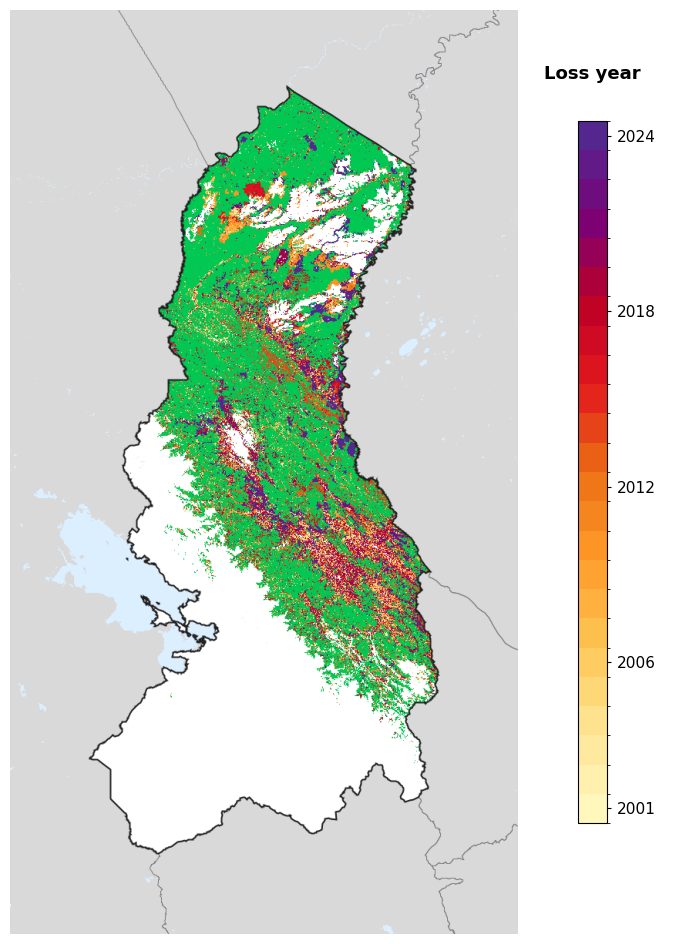
Tree-cover loss year in La Paz, 2001-2024, from the Global Forest Change dataset.

The Department of La Paz is divided into 20 provinces (provincias) which are further subdivided into 85 municipalities (municipios) and—on the fourth level—into cantons.

The provinces with their capitals are:

Province	Area km^{2}	Population (2012 census)	Capital
Abel Iturralde	42,815	18,073	Ixiamas
Aroma	4,510	97,364	Sica Sica
Bautista Saavedra	2,525	16,308	Charazani
Caranavi	3,400	59,365	Caranavi
Eliodoro Camacho	2,080	53,747	Puerto Acosta
Franz Tamayo	15,900	26,997	Apolo
Gualberto Villarroel	1,935	17,782	San Pedro de Curahuara de Carangas
Ingavi	5,410	134,535	Viacha
Inquisivi	6,430	66,346	Inquisivi
José Manuel Pando	1,976	7,381	Santiago de Machaca
José Ramón Loayza	3,370	47,295	Luribay
Larecaja	8,110	86,481	Sorata
Los Andes	1,658	77,579	Pucarani
Manco Kapac	367	27,154	Copacabana
Muñecas	4,965	29,694	Chuma
Nor Yungas	1,720	36,983	Coroico
Omasuyos	2,065	84,484	Achacachi
Pacajes	10,584	55,180	Coro Coro
Pedro Domingo Murillo	4,705	1,663,099	La Paz
Sud Yungas	5,770	105,013	Chulumani
Total:	133,985 km^{2}	2,706,359	
Note: More than 3,770 km^{2} (1,460 sq mi) of Lake Titicaca included.

== Government ==
The chief executive office of Bolivia's departments (since May 2010) is the Governor; before then, the office was called the Prefect, and until 2006 the prefect was appointed by the President of Bolivia and then the governor is elected by the voters. The current governor, Santos Quispe, was elected on 11 April 2021 and took office on 3 May.

Under the 2009 Constitution, Bolivian departments have an elected legislature, known as the Departmental Legislative Assembly. The La Paz Assembly has 45 members including five indigenous / natives minority representatives.

The most recent governor election results (2021) are as follows:

Candidate	Party	First round		Second round	
Candidate	Party	Votes	%	Votes	%
Santos Quispe	Together for the Call of the Peoples	392,132	25.18	831,816	55.23
Franklin Flores	Movement for Socialism	618,221	39.70	674,220	44.77
Rafael Quispe	For the Common Good - We are the People (MDS)	349,384	22.44		
Félix Patzi	Third System Movement	67,948	4.36		
Franclin Gutierrez	Front for Victory	23,519	1.51		
Beatriz Alvarez	Sovereignty and Liberty	22,625	1.45		
Claudia Bravo Terrazas	National Unity Front	21,331	1.37		
Juan Choque	Overcome	16,314	1.05		
Rufo Calle	Christian Democratic Party	11,033	0.71		
Mateo Laura	Civic Community - Autonomies for Bolivia	8,578	0.55		
Julio Tito	Patriotic Social Alliance	7,944	0.51		
Orlando Quispe	Bolivian National Action Party	6,886	0.44		
Federico Zelada	Movement for Sovereignty	6,269	0.40		
Santiago Quenta	For my La Paz, United Invincible	5,025	0.32		
Total		1,557,209	100.00	1,506,036	100.00
Valid votes		1,557,209	90.35	1,506,036	92.90
Invalid/blank votes		166,386	9.65	115,092	7.10
Total votes		1,723,595	100.00	1,621,128	100.00
Registered voters/turnout		1,950,428	88.37	1,947,828	83.23
Source: Plurinational Electoral Organ

=== Past executives ===
Date Began	Date Ended	Prefect/Governor	Party	Notes
23 Jan 2006	10 Aug 2008	José Luís Paredes Muñoz	Social and Democratic Power	First elected prefect. Elected in Bolivian general election, December 2005, and removed by the 2008 recall election.
12 Aug 2008	29 Aug 2008	Alejandro Zapata (acting, de facto)		
29 Aug 2008	30 May 2010	Pablo Ramos Sánchez (acting)	MAS-IPSP	Final prefect
30 May 2010	31 May 2015	César Hugo Cocarico Yana	MAS-IPSP	Elected in regional election on 4 April; first elected with the renamed title of governor
31 May 2015	3 May 2021	Félix Patzi	MTS	Elected in regional election
Source: worldstatesmen.org

== Demographics ==
Historical population
Year	Pop.	±% p.a.
1976	1,465,078	—
1992	1,900,786	+1.64%
2001	2,350,466	+2.39%
2012	2,719,344	+1.33%
2024	3,022,566	+0.88%
Source: Citypopulation

== Languages ==
The languages spoken in the department are mainly Spanish, Aymara, Quechua and Guaraní. The following table shows the number of people belonging to the recognized group of speakers.

Language	Department	Bolivia
Quechua	158,260	2,281,198
Aymara	1,181,593	1,525,321
Guaraní	1,526	62,575
Another native	4,446	49,432
Spanish	1,973,708	6,821,626
Foreign	70,448	250,754
Only native	257,242	960,491
Native and Spanish	1,027,999	2,739,407
Spanish and foreign	946,650	4,115,751

== Places of interest ==
- Apolobamba Integrated Management Natural Area
- Cotapata National Park and Integrated Management Natural Area
- Pilón Lajas Biosphere Reserve and Communal Lands
- Lake Titicaca
- Chacaltaya

== Towns and villages ==
- Arapata
- Belén, Aroma
- Khasani
- La Chojlla
- Machacamarca, Aroma
- Marquirivi
- Palcoco
- Pasto Pata
- Puerto Guaqui

== See also ==
- List of largest cities in Bolivia
