= Franz Choque =

Bolivian politician (born 1969)

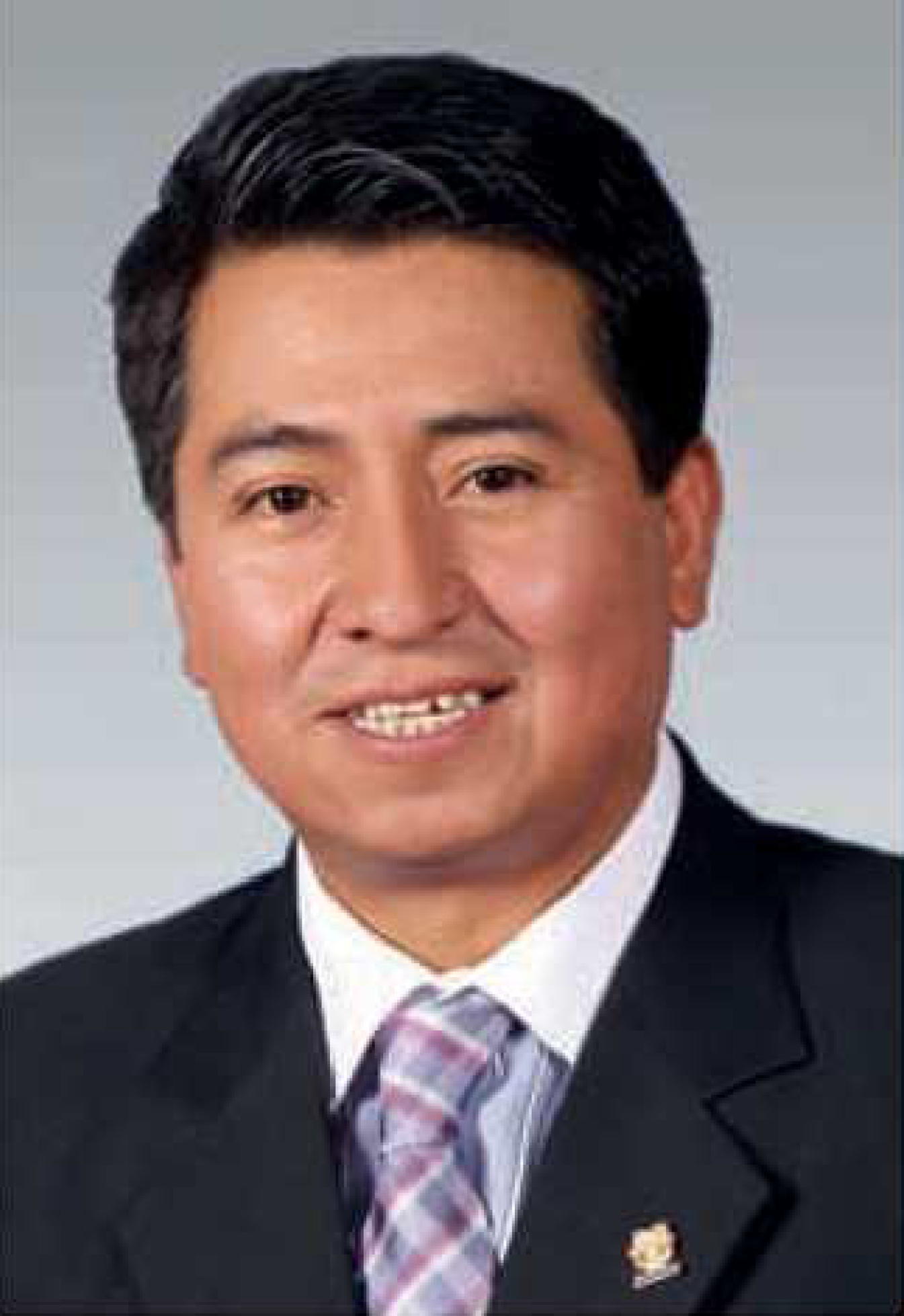
- Official portrait, 2014

Vice Minister of Employment, Civil Service, and Cooperatives
- In office 10 December 2019 – 8 June 2020
- President: Jeanine Áñez
- Minister: Oscar Mercado
- Preceded by: Emilio Rodas
- Succeeded by: Álvaro Tejerina

Member of the Chamber of Deputies from Oruro
- In office 25 January 2010 – 14 July 2014
- Substitute: Anghela Mejía
- Preceded by: Ricardo Mendoza
- Succeeded by: Anghela Mejía
- Constituency: Party list

Constituent of the Constituent Assembly from Oruro circumscription 32
- In office 6 August 2006 – 14 December 2007
- Constituency: Oruro

Personal details
- Born: Franz Gróver Choque Ulloa; 26 August 1969 (age 57) Inquisivi, La Paz, Bolivia
- Party: Social Democratic Movement (2013–present)
- Education: University of Aquinas
- Occupation: Industrial engineer; lawyer; politician

Franz Gróver Choque Ulloa (born 26 August 1969) is a Bolivian industrial engineer, lawyer, and politician who served as vice minister of employment, civil service, and cooperatives from 2019 to 2020. A member of the Social Democratic Movement, he previously served as a party-list member of the Chamber of Deputies from Oruro from 2010 to 2014 on behalf of the National Convergence alliance and as a member of the Constituent Assembly from Oruro, representing circumscription 32 from 2006 to 2007 on behalf of the Social Democratic Power alliance.

An activist forged in the student movement, Choque entered political life as a public official in the Oruro Prefecture. He made his electoral debut in the Constituent Assembly before moving on to serve in the Chamber of Deputies. In 2013, he joined the Social Democratic Movement, with whom he unsuccessfully sought reelection. Though Choque's ensuing bid for a seat in the Oruro Departmental Assembly also ended in failure, he continued as the party's departmental leader and was appointed to serve in the Áñez administration following her rise to the presidency. His tenure was cut short in 2020 after he was removed for breaking the taboo of electoralizing the interim government's public works projects.

== Early life and political career ==
Franz Choque was born on 26 August 1969 in Inquisivi, a rural locale situated in La Paz's tropical Yungas region, to a family of Aymara descent. His mother made a living selling produce, while his father worked for the National Road Service. Due to his father's vocation, Choque and his family moved to Oruro when he was 7. He studied law and industrial engineering at the University of Aquinas, where he graduated with a bachelor's in legal science. He went on the complete postgraduate studies at various universities, receiving degrees in project planning and evaluation from the Technical University of Oruro and in constitutional development from the University of San Francisco Xavier, in addition to a degree in administrative law and a master's in economic law from Tomás Frías University.

During this time, Choque became active in the student movement, serving as executive secretary of his university's student center, of its faculty of law, and of his Local University Federation before becoming a member of the Court of Honor of the Bolivian University Confederation. In the ensuing years, Choque worked as a public official in the Oruro Prefecture, heading the departmental government's investment and export promotion unit and productivity and competitiveness unit before finally serving as departmental director of productive development.

Due to his experience in student unionism, a movement historically aligned with left-wing organizations, Choque's political formation was generally socialist in nature. In that sense, it is notable, then, that his entry into electoral politics was facilitated through Social Democratic Power, a generally more conservative grouping. As a member of this alliance, Choque was elected to represent Oruro's circumscription 32 in the Constituent Assembly, charged with drafting and developing the text of the country's most recent constitution.

== Chamber of Deputies ==
=== Election ===
Following the assembly's closure, Choque accepted National Convergence (CN)'s invitation to run for a seat in the Chamber of Deputies. Campaigning in a department overwhelmingly dominated by the Movement for Socialism (MAS-IPSP)—for whom eight of every ten voters cast their ballots in 2009—left CN with no senators or circumscription-based seats. The alliance's minimal department-wide performance garnered it just one deputy elected from among its electoral list: Choque, who became the only Oruro legislator in either chamber not pertaining to the ruling party. Even then, Choque's victory was challenged by the MAS, which argued that the seat corresponded to it instead, with the ensuing legal battle even delaying his entry into the Legislative Assembly by a few days. (Note: In May 2010, a judge in La Paz ruled that Choque's and two other CN deputies' seats should have rightfully been allocated to the MAS. However, the Supreme Electoral Tribunal rejected calls to reassign the seats, arguing that it would be constitutionally and legally impossible to revoke the three deputies' mandates.)

=== Tenure ===
With the MAS's legislative dominance in mind—over two-thirds in both chambers—Choque's tenure focused less on the passage of legislation and more on his quality as an auditor, especially regarding issues relating to his home department, such as its ongoing border dispute with Potosí or acts of corruption at the customs offices along the region's frontier with Chile. His status as a regional opposition figure gained him particular notoriety in 2013 when he participated as an active leader in the protests that forced the Legislative Assembly to rescind the law renaming Juan Mendoza Airport after President Evo Morales.

CN's weak external leadership structure and minimal parliamentary presence resulted in the alliance's collapse midway through the Legislative Assembly's term. Its elected legislators dispersed to different fronts, new and old. For his part, Choque became a founding member of the Social Democratic Movement (MDS), and was selected as the party's first departmental president in Oruro. In 2014, he resigned his seat to seek reelection, topping the Democratic Unity (UD) coalition's electoral list in his department. UD's marginally better performance in Oruro originally indicated that Choque would win a second term. However, in its proportional allocation of seats, the Supreme Electoral Tribunal opted to take into account UD's victory in Oruro's special indigenous circumscription in its calculations, thus precluding Choque from reentering parliament.

=== Commission assignments ===
- Constitution, Legislation, and Electoral System Commission
  - Constitutional Development and Legislation Committee (2013–2014)
- Plural Justice, Prosecutor's Office, and Legal Defense of the State Commission
  - Ordinary Jurisdiction and Magistracy Council Committee (2011–2013)
- Planning, Economic Policy, and Finance Commission
  - Science and Technology Committee (Secretary; 2010–2011)
- International Relations and Migrant Protection Commission
  - International Relations, Migrant Protection, and International Organizations Committee (2014)

== Later political career ==
Though Choque filed an appeal, the process quickly stalled, and he refocused his efforts onto local politics. In 2015, the MDS nominated him for a seat in the Departmental Legislative Assembly, but the party's scant regional support was insufficient for victory. In the ensuing years, Choque, as leader of the MDS in Oruro, worked to consolidate the party's presence in the department, aiding and advising the party's elected local officeholders even as he simultaneously took a job as an importer to make ends meet. When fellow MDS partisan Jeanine Áñez assumed the presidency in the wake of the 2019 political crisis, Choque joined the interim administration as vice minister of employment, civil service, and cooperatives. However, he was dismissed midway through his term for breaking the taboo of "electoralizing" government functions after he indicated that the transitional government's employment plan had the opportunity to bolster the MDS's electoral prospects. Áñez's decision to campaign for a full presidential term beyond her original mandate had drawn criticism from opponents over her ability to remain an impartial actor in the transition, for which the government took steps to not appear as though it was using state resources to favor her candidacy.

== Electoral history ==
Electoral history of Franz Choque
Year	Office	Party	Alliance	Votes			Result	Ref.
Year	Office	Party	Alliance	Total	%	P.	Result	Ref.
2006	Constituent	Independent	Social Democratic Power	4,115	13.28%	2nd	Won	
2009	Deputy	Independent	National Convergence	20,170	8.99%	2nd	Won	(Note: Presented on an electoral list. The data shown represents the share of the vote the entire party/alliance received in that constituency.)
2014	Deputy	Social Democratic Movement	Democratic Unity	35,962	14.36%	2nd	Lost	
2015	Assemblyman	Social Democratic Movement	None	17,250	10.78%	3rd	Lost	
Source: Plurinational Electoral Organ | Electoral Atlas

Bolivian Constituent Assembly
Seat established	Constituent of the Constituent Assembly from Oruro circumscription 32; 2006–2007; Served alongside: Eduardo García, Dunia Ignacio	Seat dissolved
Chamber of Deputies of Bolivia
Preceded by Ricardo Mendoza	Member of the Chamber of Deputies from Oruro; 2010–2014	Succeeded by Anghela Mejía
Government offices
Preceded by Emilio Rodas	Vice Minister of Employment, Civil; Service, and Cooperatives; 2019–2020	Succeeded by Álvaro Tejerina
