= Anghela Mejía =

Bolivian politician (born 1985)

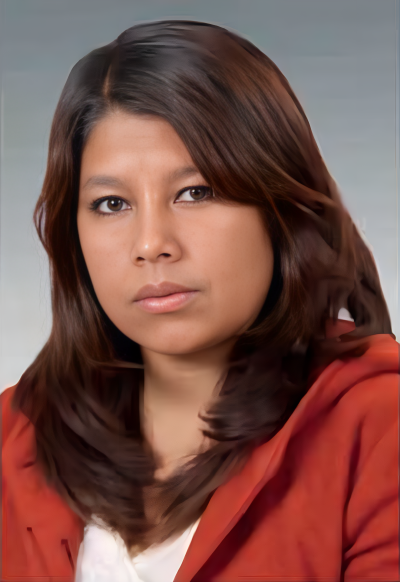
- Official portrait, 2014

Member of the Chamber of Deputies from Oruro
- In office 14 August 2014 – 18 January 2015
- Substitute: Williams Torrez
- Preceded by: Franz Choque
- Succeeded by: Francisco Quispe
- Constituency: Party list

Member of the Chamber of Deputies from Oruro
- Substitute
- In office 25 January 2010 – 14 August 2014
- Deputy: Franz Choque
- Preceded by: Carmela Pinaya
- Succeeded by: Williams Torrez
- Constituency: Party list

Personal details
- Born: Anghela Mejía Montecinos; 1 August 1985 (age 41) Oruro, Bolivia
- Education: Technical University of Oruro
- Occupation: Economist; politician

Anghela Mejía Montecinos (born 1 August 1985) is a Bolivian economist and politician who served as a substitute party-list member of the Chamber of Deputies under Franz Choque from Oruro from 2010 to 2014. A youth activist in support of departmental autonomy, she fulfilled the remainder of Choque's term from 2014 to 2015. Barred from contesting local public office in the 2015 regional elections, Mejía sought to return to the Chamber of Deputies in the 2020 elections but was unsuccessful.

== Early life and political career ==
Anghela Mejía was born on 1 August 1985 in Oruro. She studied economics at the Technical University of Oruro. Mejía entered political activity in 2008 as a member of Youth x Bolivia (JxB), an autonomist activist group that lobbied for the recognition of self-rule in the Oruro Department. Oruro had been one of five departments that overwhelmingly rejected regional autonomy in a 2006 referendum, but by the time the question was asked again in 2009, over seventy percent of the population voted in support of it.

That year, as part of the alliance between JxB and National Convergence, Mejía was selected to represent the university sector in the Chamber of Deputies. She was elected as a substitute for Franz Choque, with the pair together serving as the only opposition legislators representing Oruro in either legislative chamber. When Choque resigned to seek reelection in mid-2014, Mejía fulfilled the remainder of his term. The following year, the Social Democratic Movement nominated her for a seat in the Oruro Departmental Legislative Assembly. However, her candidacy was disqualified, an issue faced by many legislators from the outgoing Legislative Assembly. In a controversial ruling, the Supreme Electoral Tribunal (TSE) had barred nearly all outgoing parliamentarians from running for local public office, arguing that their permanent residence in the last two years had been La Paz, the seat of government, and not their respective regions, contravening the Constitution's residency requirements for candidates. Though the TSE opted to exclude substitute legislators from its ruling, reasoning that, on average, they resided more in their constituencies than their full-time counterparts, many—like Mejía—were still disqualified because they had taken their companion's seats, thus counting as titular deputies. Unable to compete in 2015, Mejía sought to return to the Chamber of Deputies in the 2020 elections as a member of the Libre 21 alliance, which sponsored Jorge Quiroga's presidential candidacy. However, in a bid to unite the divided opposition field, Quiroga withdrew his name from the ballot just days before the election, thus disqualifying Libre 21's entire slate of candidates.

== Electoral history ==
Electoral history of Anghela Mejía
Year	Office	Party	Alliance	Votes			Result	Ref.
Year	Office	Party	Alliance	Total	%	P.	Result	Ref.
2009	Sub. Deputy	Youth x Bolivia	National Convergence	20,170	8.99%	2nd (Note: Presented on an electoral list. The data shown represents the share of the vote the entire party/alliance received in that constituency.)	Won	
2015	Assemblywoman	Social Democratic Movement	None	Disqualified			Lost	
2020	Sub. Deputy	Independent	Libre 21	Withdrew			Lost	
Source: Plurinational Electoral Organ | Electoral Atlas

Chamber of Deputies of Bolivia
Preceded by Carmela Pinaya	Substitute Member of the Chamber of Deputies from Oruro; 2010–2014	Succeeded by Williams Torrez
Preceded by Franz Choque	Member of the Chamber of Deputies from Oruro; 2014–2015	Succeeded by Francisco Quispe
