= Wayllani =

Mountain in Bolivia

- Location within Bolivia

Highest point
- Elevation: 4,206 m (13,799 ft)
- Coordinates: 17°58′42″S 66°54′24″W

Geography
- Location: Bolivia, Oruro Department
- Parent range: Andes

Wayllani (Aymara waylla Stipa obtusa, a kind of feather grass, -ni a suffix, "the one with the feather grass", also spelled Huayllani) is a 4,206-metre-high (13,799 ft) mountain in the Andes in Bolivia. It is located in the Oruro Department, Cercado Province, Paria Municipality (formerly Soracachi). Wayllani lies east of Jach'a Ch'ankha and southeast of Chunkara.
