= Wichhu Qullu (Cercado) =

Mountain in Bolivia

- Location within Bolivia

Highest point
- Elevation: 4,430 m (14,530 ft)
- Coordinates: 17°59′56″S 66°54′42″W

Geography
- Location: Bolivia, Oruro Department, Cercado Province
- Parent range: Andes

Wichhu Qullu (Aymara jichu, wichhu stipa ichu, qullu mountain, "ichu mountain", also spelled Wichu Kkollu) is a 4,430-metre-high (14,530 ft) mountain in the Andes in Bolivia. It is located in the Oruro Department, Cercado Province, Paria Municipality (formerly Soracachi). Wichhu Qullu lies southwest of Wayllani and southeast of Kuntur Ikiña.
