= Jach'a Uma =

- Etymology: Aymara

Location
- Country: Bolivia
- Region: Oruro Department, Cercado Province

Basin features
- Tributaries
  - left: Waylluma River, Kachi Kachi River (Iruma River)

Jach'a Uma (Aymara jach'a big, great, uma water, "big water", also spelled Jacha Uma, Jachcha Uma) is a Bolivian river in the Oruro Department, Cercado Province, Paria Municipality (formerly Soracachi Municipality), northeast of Oruro. It flows in a bow from east to west along the village of T'ula Pallqa where it is named T'ula Pallqa and then along Paria. East of Paria Jach'a Uma receives waters from the rivers Kachi Kachi (Iruma) and Waylluma coming from the southeast. Between Uyuni and Calacoto the river seeps away.

== See also ==
- List of rivers of Bolivia
