= Juan Vélez de Córdova =

Juan Vélez de Córdova (October 3, 1711 –July 7, 1739) was a Creole who, pretending to be a descendant of the Peruvian Incas, led the first important conspiracy of the town of Oruro against Spanish domination.

== Biography ==
Juan Vélez de Córdova was born on October 3, 1711, in Moquegua, Lower Peru. He was the legitimate son of the Spanish captain Juan Vélez de Córdova, political and military leader of the town of Moquegua, and the Spanish lady María Romero.

He was the second son of three brothers, and due to the privileged position of his parents he was able to access a decent education. Therefore, he was Spanish American by birth.

He later married the Creole Juana Yáñez de Zeballos. He led the first important conspiracy in the town of Oruro, but it was revealed shortly before its completion, in 1739. Juan was arrested and later executed.

In their conspiracy, creoles, mestizos and Indians were equally claimed, responsible, because not only did the Indians pay tributes, lying painfully in Potosí and Huancavelica, but they also wanted to force creoles and mestizos to pay tributes, as had already occurred in Cochabamba in 1730, in the conspiracy led by Alejo Calatayud.

== Capture ==
He was arrested in Cuzco in 1735, when he was only 24 years old, having in his possession a letter from the Inca nobleman Juan Bustamante, in which he did not accept his plans and reproached him for not being loyal to the king. He later established his residence and base of operations in Oruro, likely because it had less royal surveillance than other towns.
