= Chunkara (Bolivia) =

Mountain in Bolivia

- Location within Bolivia

Highest point
- Elevation: 4,168 m (13,675 ft)
- Listing: Mountains of Oruro Department
- Coordinates: 17°57′56″S 66°55′04″W

Geography
- Location: Bolivia, Oruro Department
- Parent range: Andes

Chunkara (Aymara for "pointed mountain", also spelled Chuncara) is a 4,168-metre-high (13,675 ft) mountain in the Andes in Bolivia. It is located in the Oruro Department, Cercado Province, Paria Municipality (formerly Soracachi). Chunkara lies northeast of Jach'a Ch'ankha.
