= Caracollo =

Caracollo Q'araqullu
- Town
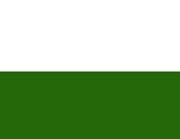
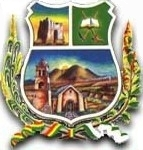
- Flag Seal
- Interactive map of Caracollo
- Coordinates: 17°38′S 67°13′W
- Country: Bolivia
- Department: Oruro
- Province: Cercado Province
- Municipality: Caracollo

Population (2001)
  - Total: 4,412
  - Ethnicities: Aymara Quechua
- Time zone: UTC-4 (BOT)

Caracollo (Hispanicized spelling), Q'araqullu or Q'ara Qullu (Aymara q'ara bald, qullu mountain, "bald mountain") is a small town in Bolivia. It is situated in the Cercado Province of the Oruro Department. In 2010 it had an estimated population of 5,429. Located at the place where the highway from La Paz splits into two roads towards Cochabamba and Oruro, the town is a frequent starting point for long marches intended to influence the Bolivian government.

== Climate ==
Climate data for Caracollo, elevation 3,770 m (12,370 ft)
Month	Jan	Feb	Mar	Apr	May	Jun	Jul	Aug	Sep	Oct	Nov	Dec	Year
Record high °C (°F)	27.0 (80.6)	26.8 (80.2)	27.2 (81.0)	26.8 (80.2)	24.0 (75.2)	23.2 (73.8)	23.1 (73.6)	24.9 (76.8)	24.8 (76.6)	25.1 (77.2)	26.7 (80.1)	26.5 (79.7)	27.2 (81.0)
Mean daily maximum °C (°F)	20.4 (68.7)	20.7 (69.3)	20.4 (68.7)	21.0 (69.8)	19.6 (67.3)	18.6 (65.5)	18.6 (65.5)	19.7 (67.5)	19.9 (67.8)	21.6 (70.9)	22.6 (72.7)	21.5 (70.7)	20.4 (68.7)
Daily mean °C (°F)	13.1 (55.6)	12.9 (55.2)	12.4 (54.3)	10.6 (51.1)	7.3 (45.1)	5.7 (42.3)	6.6 (43.9)	7.9 (46.2)	9.5 (49.1)	11.5 (52.7)	12.7 (54.9)	13.1 (55.6)	10.3 (50.5)
Mean daily minimum °C (°F)	5.7 (42.3)	5.4 (41.7)	4.3 (39.7)	0.2 (32.4)	−4.6 (23.7)	−6.9 (19.6)	−5.9 (21.4)	−3.8 (25.2)	−0.8 (30.6)	1.2 (34.2)	2.5 (36.5)	4.7 (40.5)	0.2 (32.3)
Record low °C (°F)	−1.1 (30.0)	−2.4 (27.7)	−4.0 (24.8)	−7.5 (18.5)	−12.8 (9.0)	−13.9 (7.0)	−15.1 (4.8)	−12.0 (10.4)	−8.6 (16.5)	−6.5 (20.3)	−8.6 (16.5)	−5.0 (23.0)	−15.1 (4.8)
Average precipitation mm (inches)	94.2 (3.71)	72.0 (2.83)	56.5 (2.22)	18.9 (0.74)	1.6 (0.06)	3.1 (0.12)	4.2 (0.17)	9.0 (0.35)	27.3 (1.07)	19.6 (0.77)	31.3 (1.23)	65.1 (2.56)	402.8 (15.83)
Average precipitation days	16	12	13	5	1	1	1	3	6	7	9	13	87
Source: Servicio Nacional de Meteorología e Hidrología de Bolivia
