= Cercado Province (Oruro) =

Cercado
- Province
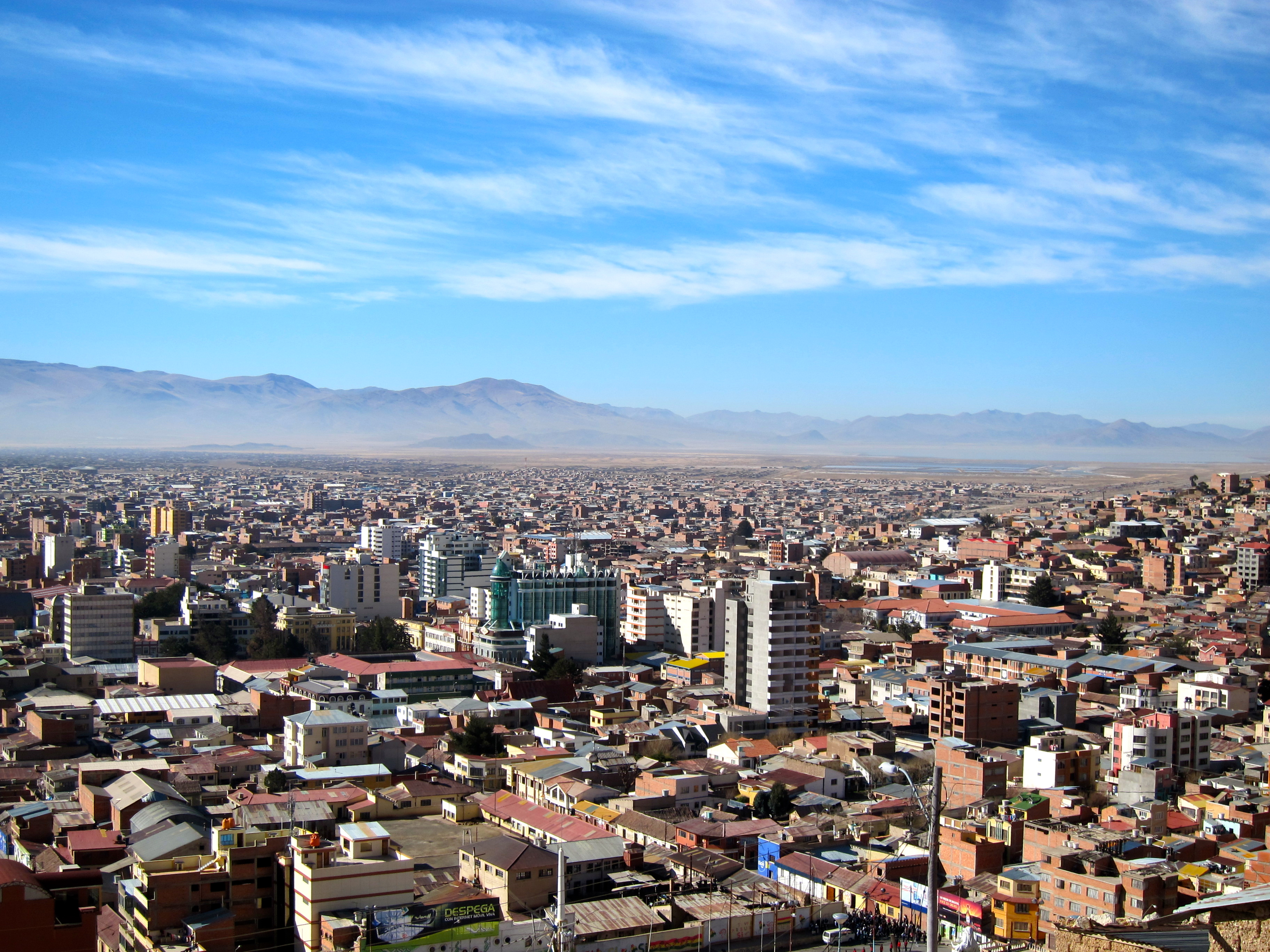
- Oruro

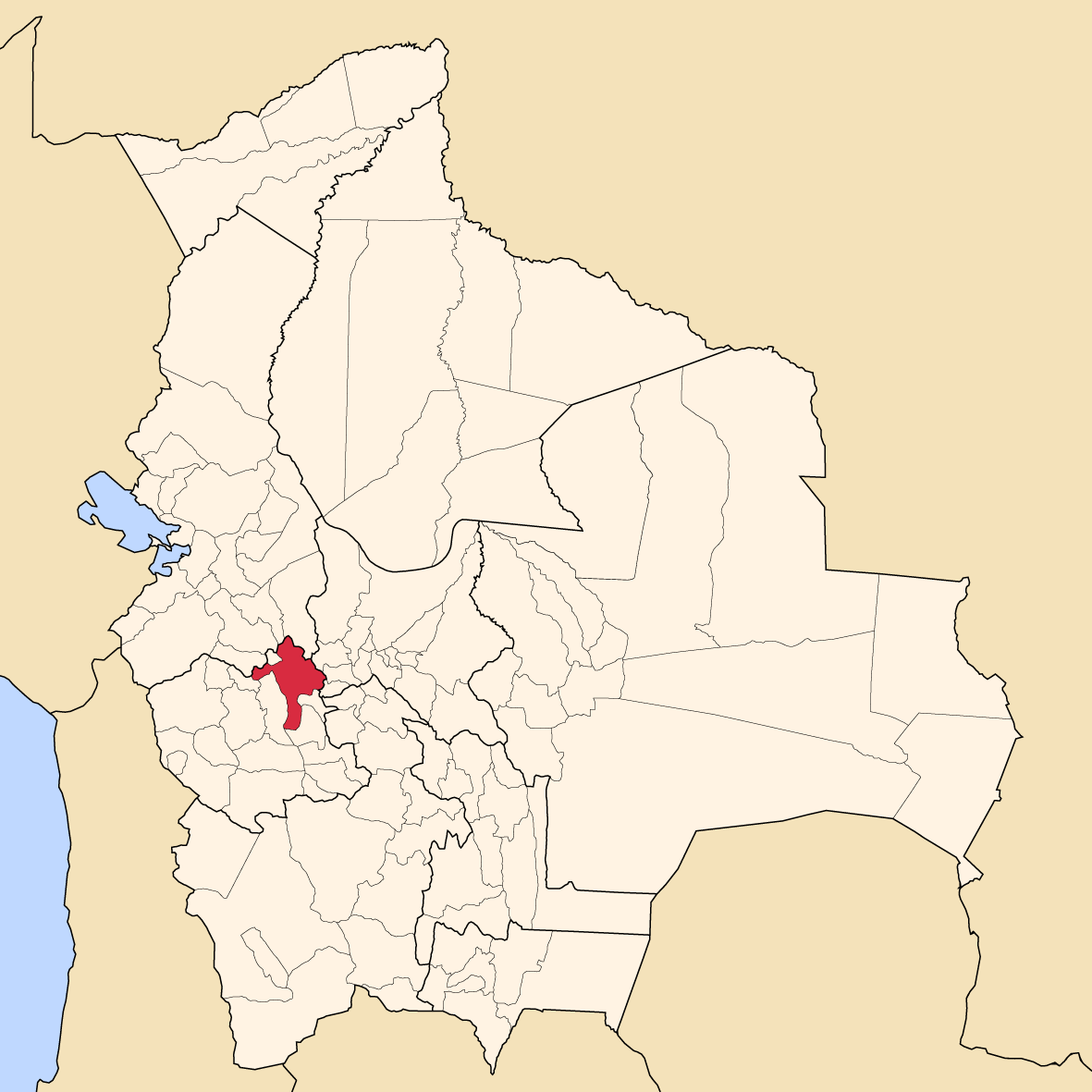
- Location of Cercado Province in Bolivia
- Coordinates: 17°58′S 66°50′W
- Country: Bolivia
- Department: Oruro
- Capital: Oruro

Area
  - Total: 5,162 km^{2} (1,993 sq mi)

Population (2024 census)
  - Total: 346,633
  - Density: 67.15/km^{2} (173.9/sq mi)
  - Ethnicities: Quechua Aymara

Languages spoken
  - Spanish: 96.7%
  - Quechua: 43.3%
  - Aymara: 25.5%
- Time zone: UTC-4 (BOT)

Cercado is a province in the northeastern parts of the Bolivian department of Oruro. Its capital is Oruro. The hamlet of Paria, established in 1535, was the first Spanish settlement in Bolivia and previously had been a regional capital of the Inca Empire. Paria is located in Soracachi municipality.

== Location ==
Cercado province is one of sixteen provinces in the Oruro Department. It is located between 17° 22' and 18° 35' South and between 66° 21' and 67° 20' West.

It borders Tomas Barrón Province and La Paz Department in the northwest, Nor Carangas Province and Saucarí Province in the west, Poopó Province and Pantaléon Dalence Province in the southeast, and Cochabamba Department in the east and north.

The province extends over 135 km from North to South, and 105 km from east to west.

== Geography ==
Some of the highest mountains of the province are listed below:

- Apachita
- Chullpa
- Chullunkhäni
- Chunkara
- Chuwallani
- Inka Saruma
- Jach'a Ch'ankha
- Jach'a Ch'utu
- Janq'u Janq'u
- Janq'u Quta
- Kuntur Ikiña
- Kunturini
- Millu Q'awa
- Nina Qullu
- Pä Qullu
- Qala Qala
- Q'ara Khuchi
- Tampu
- Tira Tirani
- Wayllani
- Wichhu Qullu
- Wisk'achani

== Population ==
The main language of the province is Spanish, spoken by 96.7%, 43.3% of the population speak Quechua and 25.5% speak Aymara.

The population increased from 213,755 inhabitants (1992 census) to 241,230 (2001 census), an increase of 12.9%. - 39.4% of the population is younger than 15 years old.

18.6% of the population have no access to electricity, 67.5% have no sanitary facilities.

16.3% of the population are employed in agriculture, 1.8% in mining, 11.9% in industry, 70.0% in general services (2001).

83.0% of the population are Catholics, 13.5% are Protestants (1992).

== Division ==
The province comprises four municipalities which are further subdivided into cantons.

Section	Municipality	Seat
Capital Municipality	Oruro Municipality	Oruro
1st	Caracollo Municipality	Caracollo
2nd	El Choro Municipality	El Choro
3rd	Pari-Paria-Soracachi	Soracachi

== See also ==
- Jach'a Uma
- Qala Qala
