= Qala Qala =

Archaeological site in Bolivia

Qala Qala Qillqata
- Location within Bolivia
- 18.02083°S 66.90989°W
- Location: Bolivia
- Region: Oruro Department, Cercado Province

Site notes
- Height: 4,050 metres (13,287 ft)

Qala Qala (Aymara qala stone, the reduplication indicates that there is a group or a complex of something, "a group of stones", hispanicized spellings Calacala, Cala Cala, also Kala Kala) is an archaeological site in Bolivia in a valley of the same name. The valley is known for its rock art. The zone where the rock paintings are found is also known as Qillqata (Aymara qillqaña to write, -ta a suffix to indicate the participle, "written" or "something written", hispanicized Quelcata, Quellqata). It is located in the Oruro Department, Cercado Province, Soracachi Municipality, southeast of Oruro. The rocks are situated about two km far from the village Qala Qala (Calacala), at a height of about 4,050 metres (13,287 ft).

The rock paintings of Qala Qala were declared a National Monument on May 2, 1970, by Supreme Decrete No. 9087.
