= 2006 Bolivian Constituent Assembly election =

Constituent Assembly elections were held in Bolivia on 2 July 2006, alongside a referendum on increased regional autonomy. The ruling Movement for Socialism won 137 of the 255 seats.

== Results ==
Party	Votes	%	Seats		
Party	Votes	%	Department	National	Total
Movement for Socialism	1,322,656	50.72	18	119	137
Social and Democratic Power	399,670	15.33	11	49	60
National Unity Front	187,710	7.20	3	5	8
MNR–Alliance 3	101,750	3.90	1	1	2
National Coalition	93,248	3.58	2	3	5
Social Patriotic Alliance	63,565	2.44	1	1	2
Revolutionary Nationalist Movement	59,239	2.27	3	5	8
Autonomy for Bolivia	57,906	2.22	1	2	3
Integration Social Autonomy	56,907	2.18	0	0	0
Revolutionary Left Movement	39,983	1.53	1	0	1
Democratic Patriotic Transformation	37,684	1.45	0	0	0
MNR–FRI	35,580	1.36	1	7	8
Free Bolivia Movement	27,658	1.06	1	7	8
ADN–UCS	23,342	0.90	0	1	1
Social Alliance	20,970	0.80	1	5	6
Nationalist Democratic Action	18,905	0.72	0	0	0
Solidarity Civic Unity	12,750	0.49	0	0	0
Ayra Movement	12,667	0.49	0	2	2
Original People's Movement	12,309	0.47	1	2	3
Citizen's Action Movement	8,903	0.34	0	0	0
National Democratic Convergence	4,247	0.16	0	0	0
San Felipe de Austria Citizen's Movement	3,992	0.15	0	1	1
Regional Autonomy Movement	2,486	0.10	0	0	0
Bolivian Integration Movement	1,869	0.07	0	0	0
Alianza de Bases	1,645	0.06	0	0	0
Total	2,607,641	100.00	45	210	255
Valid votes	2,607,641	83.22			
Invalid/blank votes	525,970	16.78			
Total votes	3,133,611	100.00			
Registered voters/turnout	3,713,379	84.39			
Source: PDBA, ACE Oviedo & Furio
