= 2006 Bolivian regional autonomy referendum =

A referendum on granting greater autonomy to the departments of Bolivia was held on 2 July 2006, alongside elections for a Constitutional Assembly. Whilst it was approved in four of the nine departments, the proposal was rejected by 58% of voters nationally.

== Results ==
The question asked was:

Do you agree, within the framework of national unity, with giving the Constituent Assembly the binding mandate to establish a regime of departmental autonomy, applicable immediately after the promulgation of the new Political Constitution of the State in the Departments where this Referendum has a majority, so that their authorities are chosen directly by the citizens and receive from the National Government executive authority, administrative power and financial resources that the Political Constitution of the State and the Laws grant them?

Choice	Votes	%
For	1,237,312	42.41
Against	1,680,017	57.59
Invalid/blank votes	220,995	–
Total	3,138,324	100
Registered voters/turnout	3,713,376	84.51
Source: IFES

=== By Department ===
Department	For		Against		Invalid/ blank	Total	Registered voters	Turnout
Department	Votes	%	Votes	%	Invalid/ blank	Total	Registered voters	Turnout
Beni	74,059	73.83	26,247	26.17	5,476	105,782	128,836	82.11
Chuquisaca	59,557	37.77	98,135	62.23	18,342	176,034	211,170	83.36
Cochabamba	194,461	36.97	331,600	63.03	41,748	567,809	662,219	85.74
La Paz	256,664	26.56	709,848	73.44	65,313	1,031,825	1,191,901	86.57
Oruro	39,486	24.52	121,564	75.48	13,809	174,859	201,267	86.88
Pando	11,401	57.69	8,362	42.31	796	20,559	24,691	83.27
Potosí	51,886	26.88	141,141	73.12	27,696	220,723	275,281	80.18
Santa Cruz	466,826	71.11	189,622	28.89	35,739	692,187	838,846	82.52
Tarija	82,972	60.80	53,498	39.20	12,076	148,546	179,165	82.91
Total	1,237,312	42.41	1,680,017	57.59	220,995	3,138,324	3,713,376	84.51
Source: Direct Democracy
