= Juan Mendoza Airport =

Airport in Bolivia

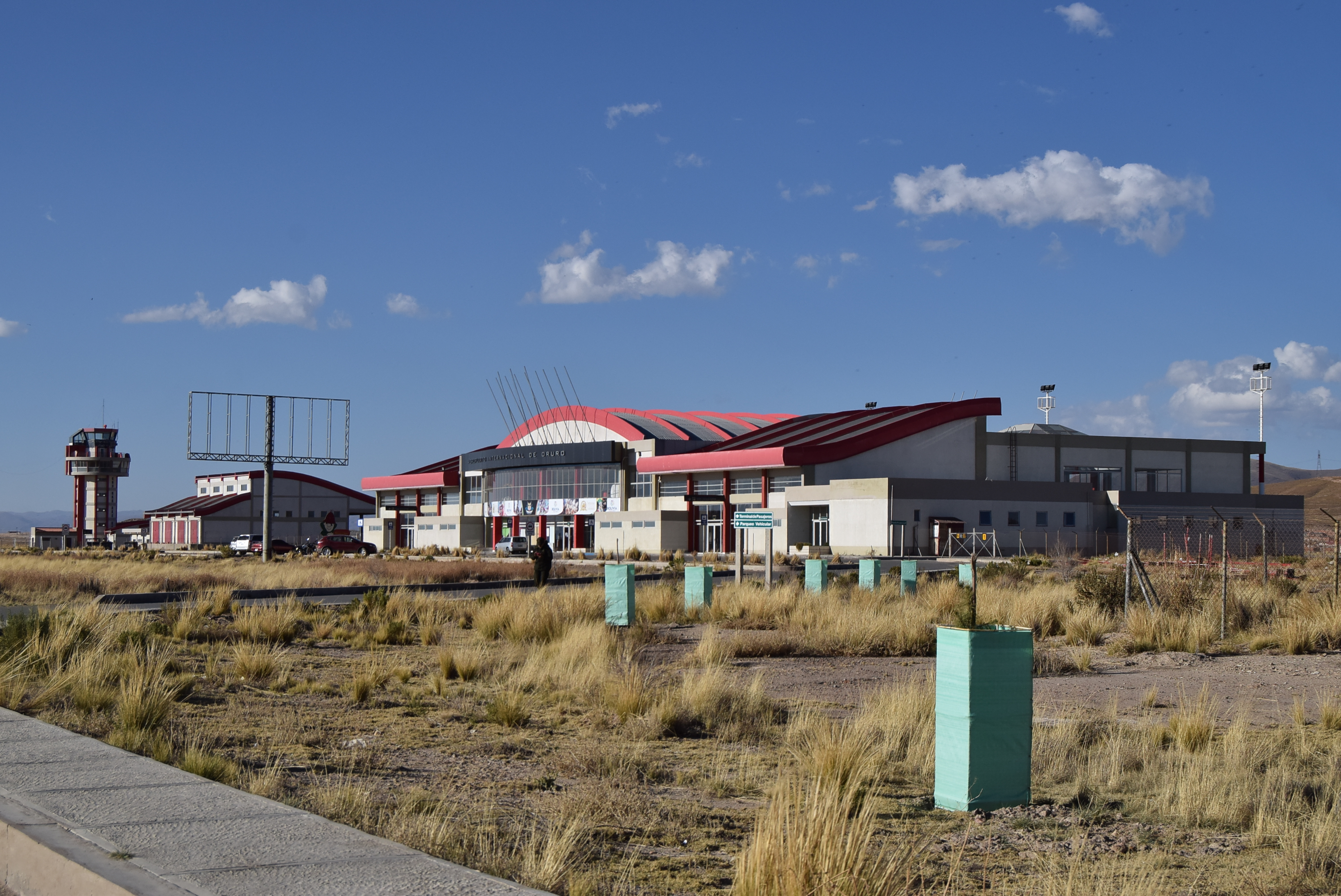
- IATA: ORU; ICAO: SLOR

Summary
- Airport type: Public
- Operator: Government
- Serves: Oruro, Bolivia
- Elevation AMSL: 12,146 ft / 3,702 m
- Coordinates: 17°57′45″S 67°04′34″W

Map
- Location of the airport in Bolivia

Runways
Direction	Length		Surface
Direction	m	ft	Surface
01/19	4,000	13,123	Asphalt
- Sources: SkyVector GCM Google Maps

Juan Mendoza Airport (Spanish: Aeropuerto Juan Mendoza) (IATA: ORU, ICAO: SLOR) is an extremely high elevation airport serving the city of Oruro, the capital of the Oruro Department in Bolivia.

The airport is in the eastern part of the city, which is in the altiplano of Bolivia. There is distant mountainous terrain east and west of the airport.

The Oruro non-directional beacon (Ident: ORU) is located 0.9 nautical miles (1.7 km) west of the field. The Oruro VOR-DME (Ident: ORU) is located 0.49 nautical miles (0.91 km) off the displaced threshold of Runway 01.

== Airlines and destinations ==
Airlines	Destinations
Boliviana de Aviación	Cochabamba

== See also ==
- Transport in Bolivia
- List of airports in Bolivia
