= Jach'a Ch'ankha =

Mountain in Bolivia

- Location within Bolivia

Highest point
- Elevation: 4,345 m (14,255 ft)
- Coordinates: 17°58′37″S 66°55′48″W

Geography
- Location: Bolivia, Oruro Department
- Parent range: Andes

Jach'a Ch'ankha (Aymara jach'a big, great, ch'ankha wool cord, "great cord", also spelled Jachcha Chankha) is a 4,345-metre-high (14,255 ft) mountain in the Andes in Bolivia. It is located in the Oruro Department, Cercado Province, Paria Municipality (formerly Soracachi), 16 km east of Oruro. Jach'a Ch'ankha lies near the villages of Paya Payani in the northeast, Qala Qala in the south and Irsuma in the southwest.
