= Oruro =

Oruro Uru Uru
- City
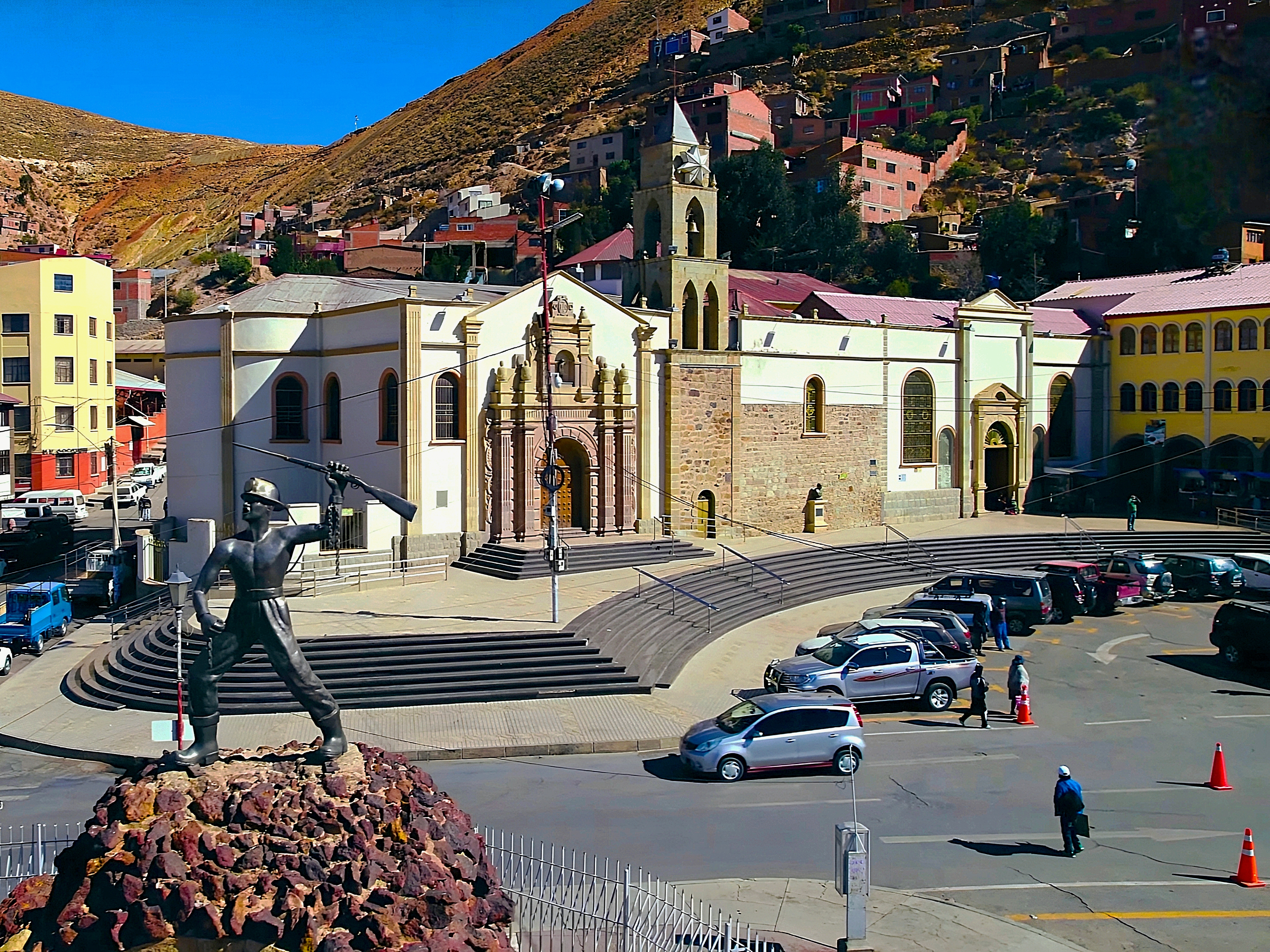
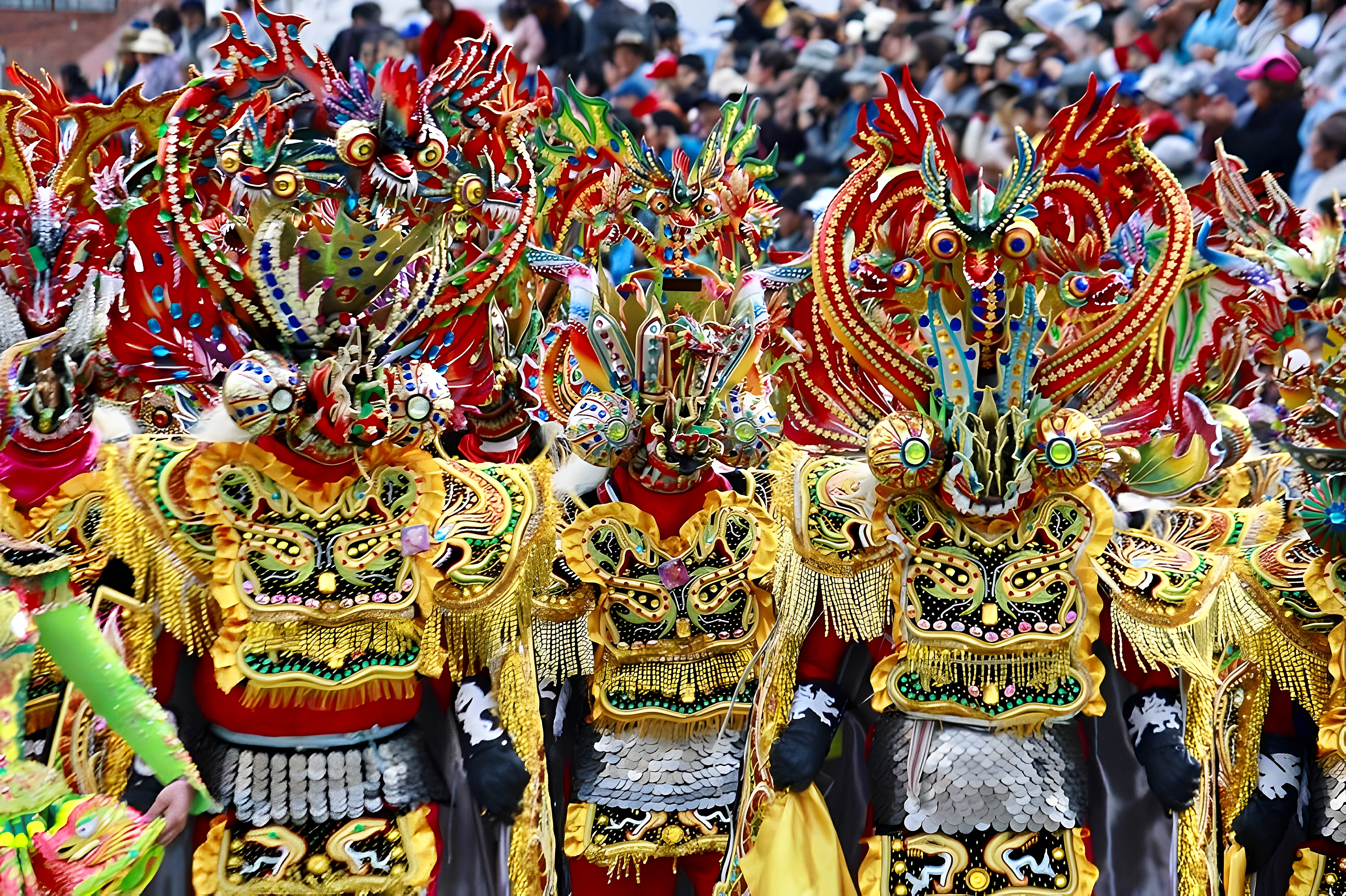
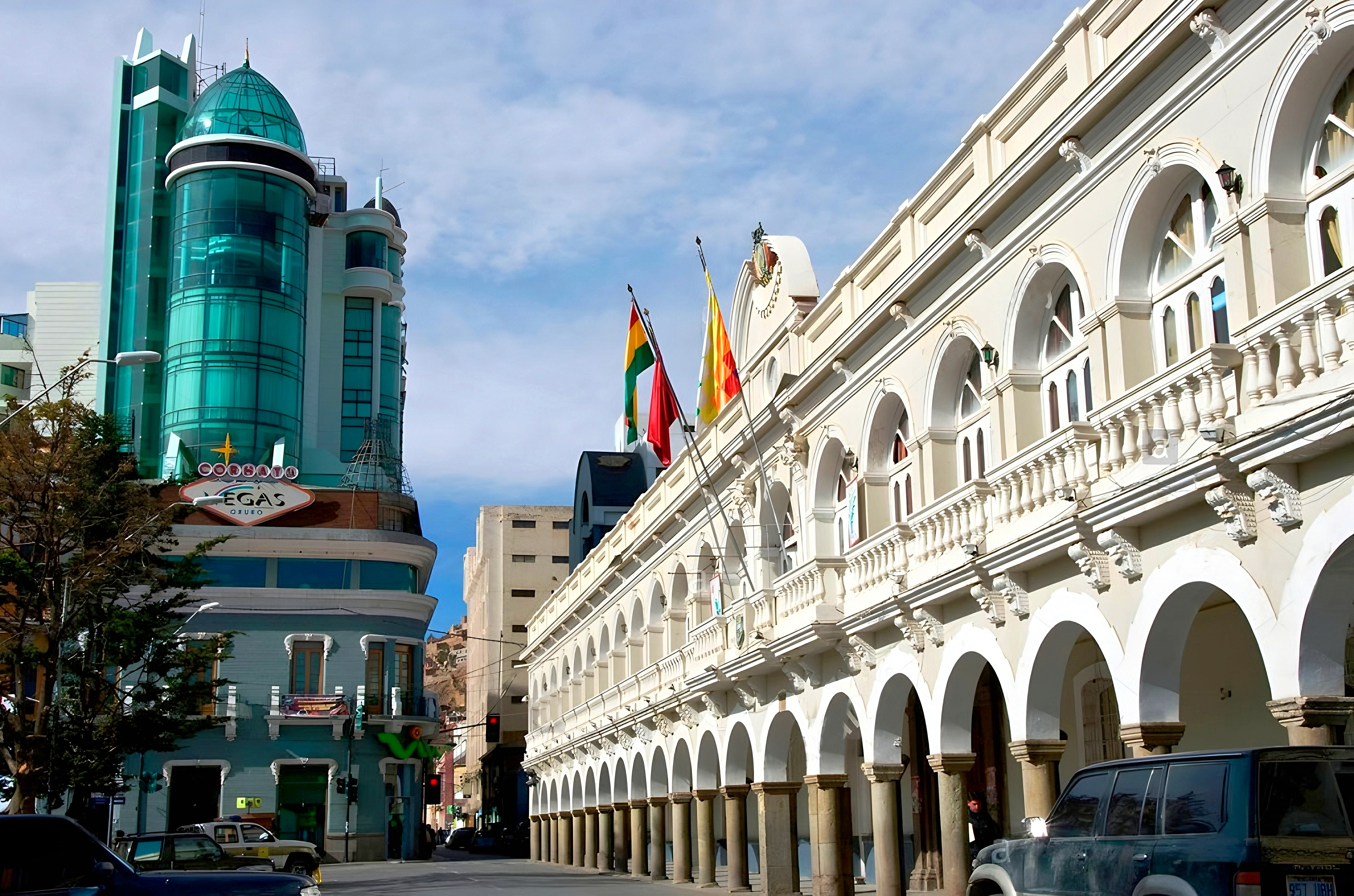
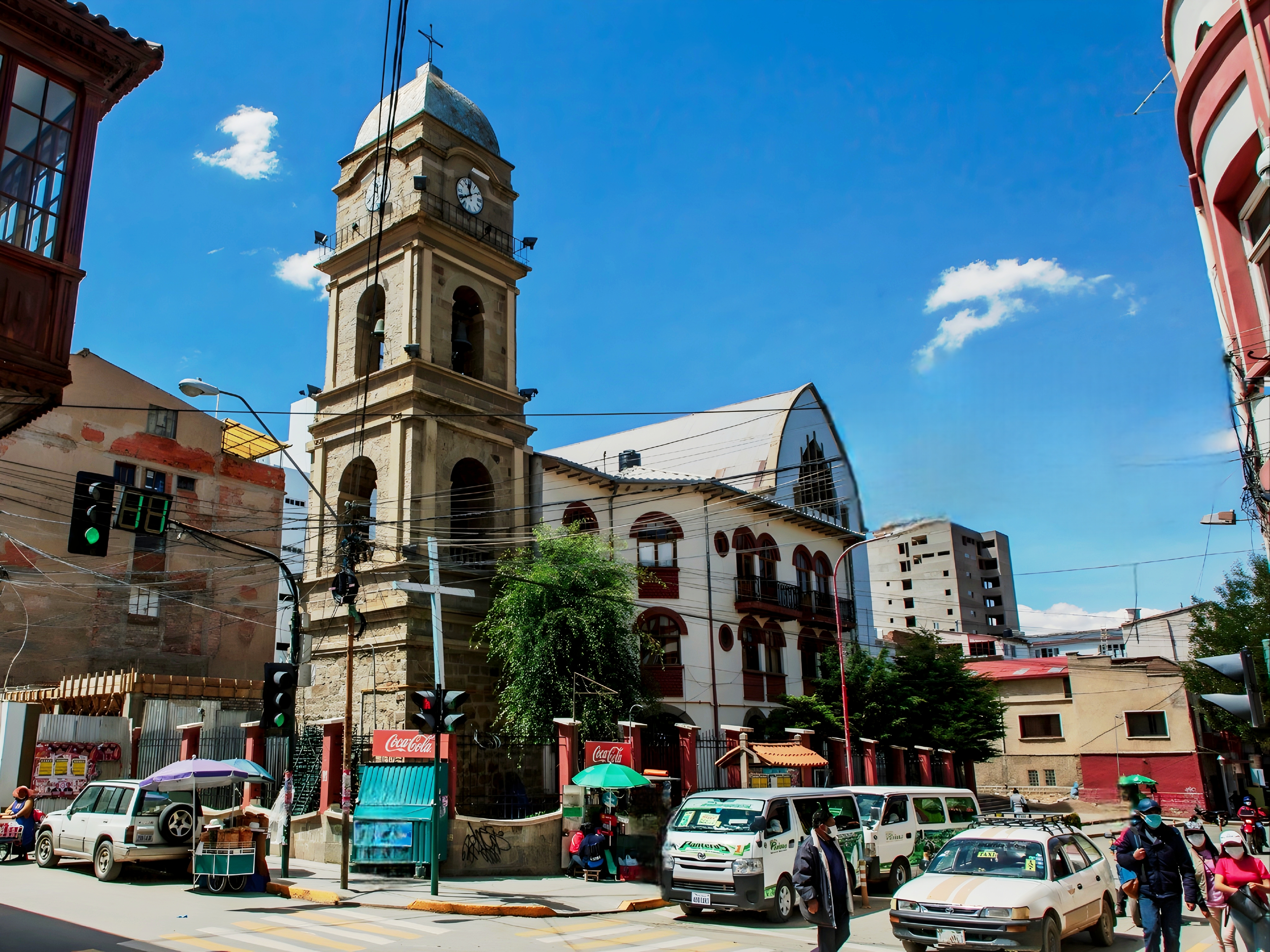
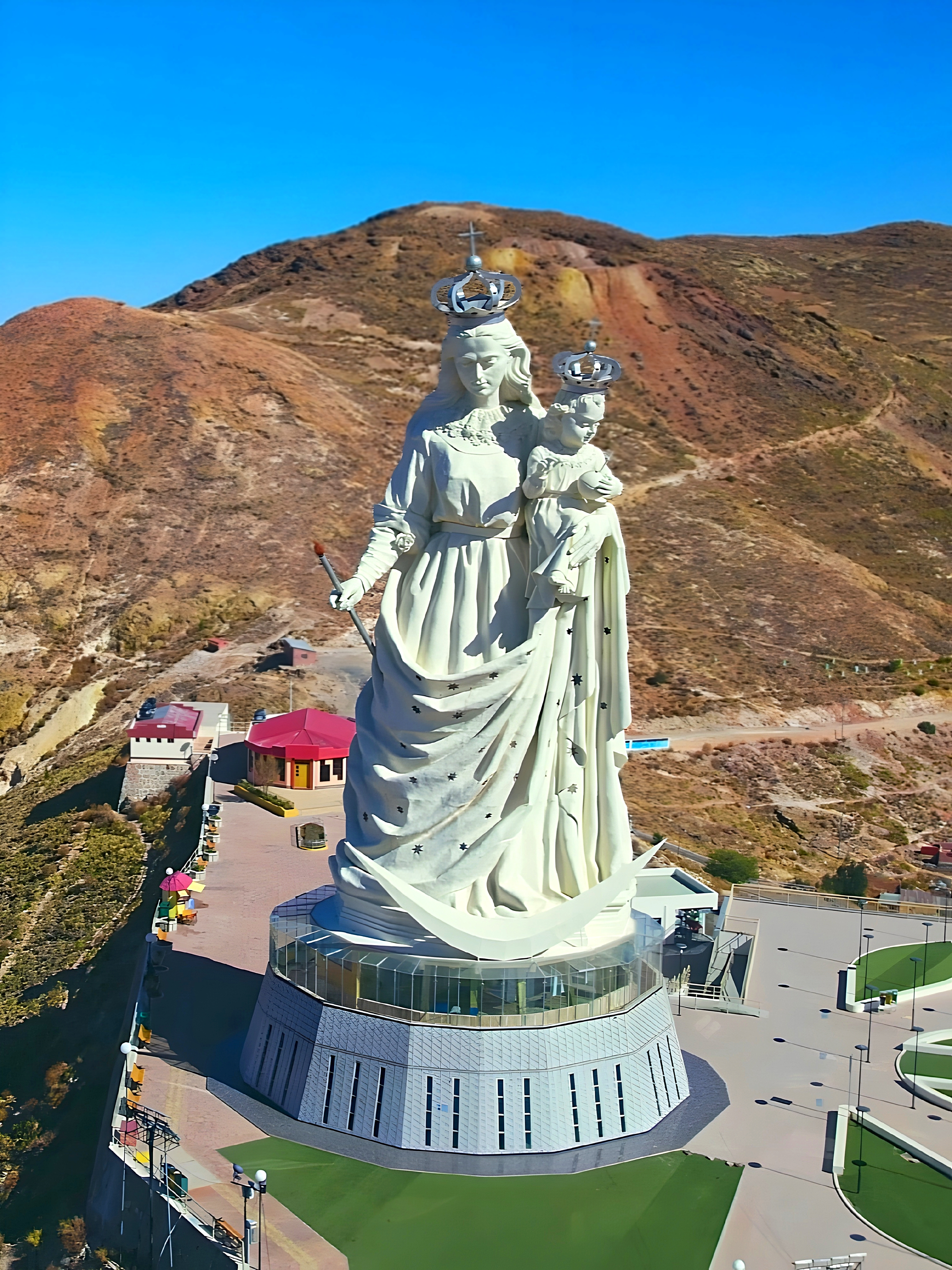
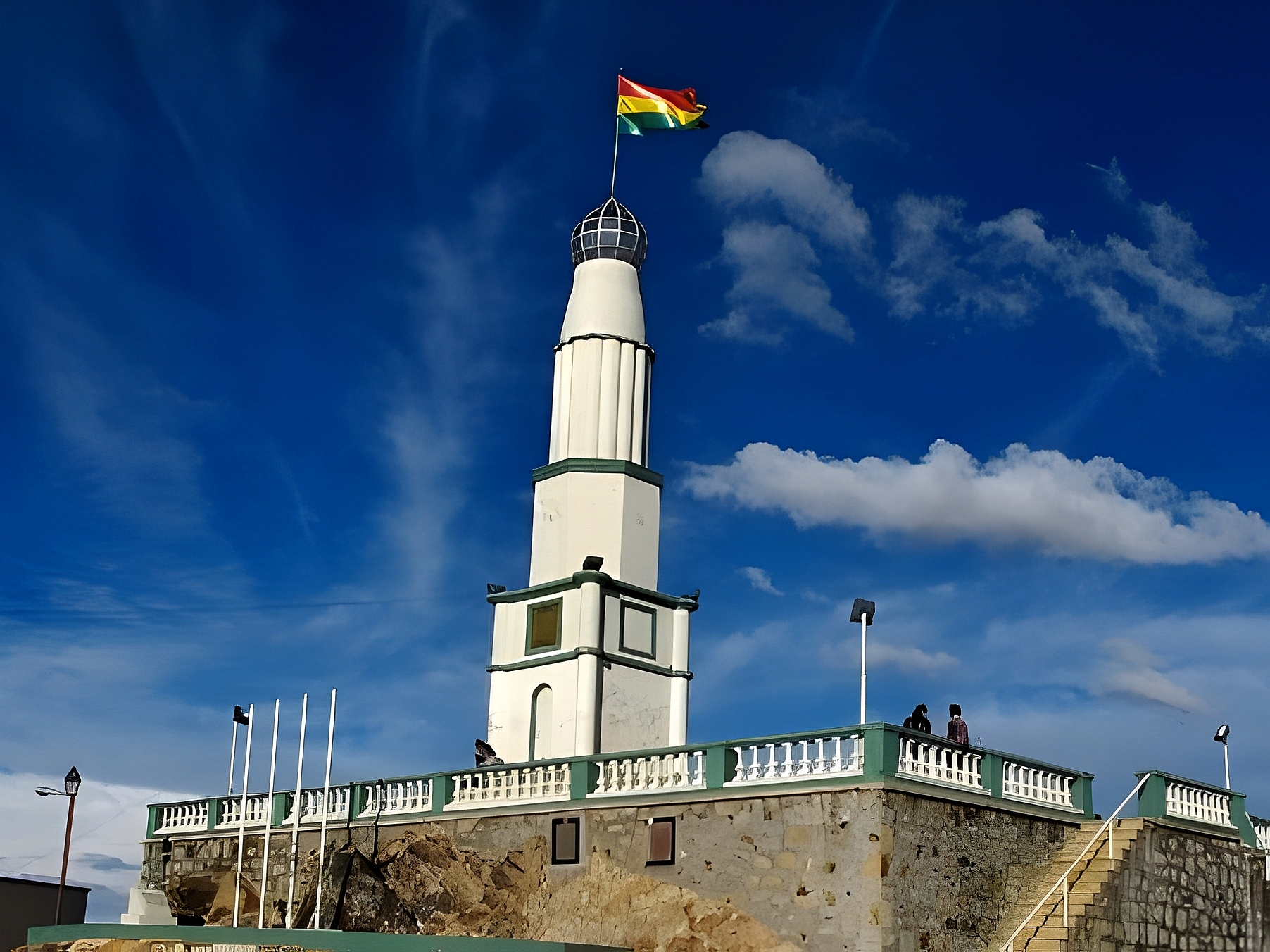
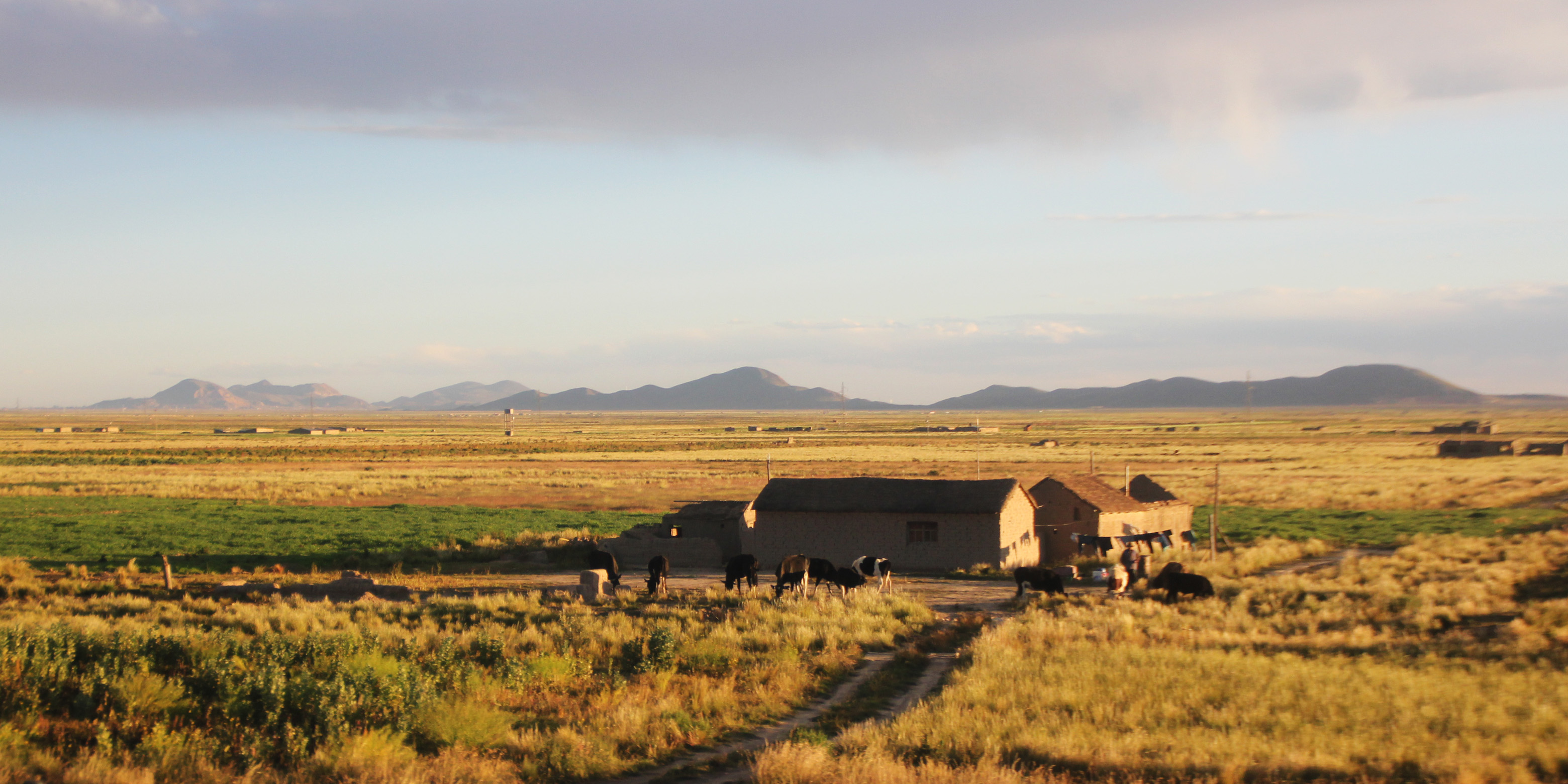
- Sanctuary of Our Lady of Socavón Dance of the Diablada Government of Oruro Metropolitan Cathedral Virgin of Socavón Lighthouse of Conchupata Altiplano between the towns of Cahuasi and Caracollo seen from the RN4

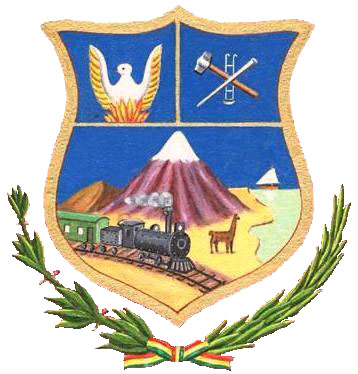
- Flag Coat of arms
- Nickname(s): La capital minera de Bolivia (The mining capital of Bolivia); La capital folclore boliviano (The folklore capital of Bolivia)
- Location within Bolivia Oruro (South America)
- Coordinates: 17°58′S 67°07′W
- Country: Bolivia
- Department: Oruro Department
- Province: Cercado Province
- Founded: November 1, 1606

Government
  - Mayor: Adhemar Wilkarani

Area
  - City: 1,633 km^{2} (631 sq mi)
- Elevation: 3,735 m (12,254 ft)

Population (2024 Census)
  - City: 298,350
  - Rank: 5th in Bolivia; 4th (Agglomeration); 5th (Metro)
  - Density: 182.7/km^{2} (473.2/sq mi)
  - Urban: 347,830
  - Metro: 359,000
- Demonym: orureño -a (Spanish)
- Time zone: UTC-4 (BOT)
- Website: Official website

Oruro (Hispanicized spelling) or Uru Uru is a city in Bolivia with a population of 264,683 (2012 calculation), about halfway between La Paz and Sucre in the Altiplano, approximately 3,709 meters (12,169 ft) above sea level.

It is Bolivia's fifth-largest city by population, after Santa Cruz de la Sierra, El Alto, La Paz, and Cochabamba. It is the capital of the Department of Oruro and the seat of the Roman Catholic Diocese of Oruro. Oruro has been subject to cycles of boom and bust owing to its dependence on the mining industry, notably tin, tungsten, silver and copper.

== History ==
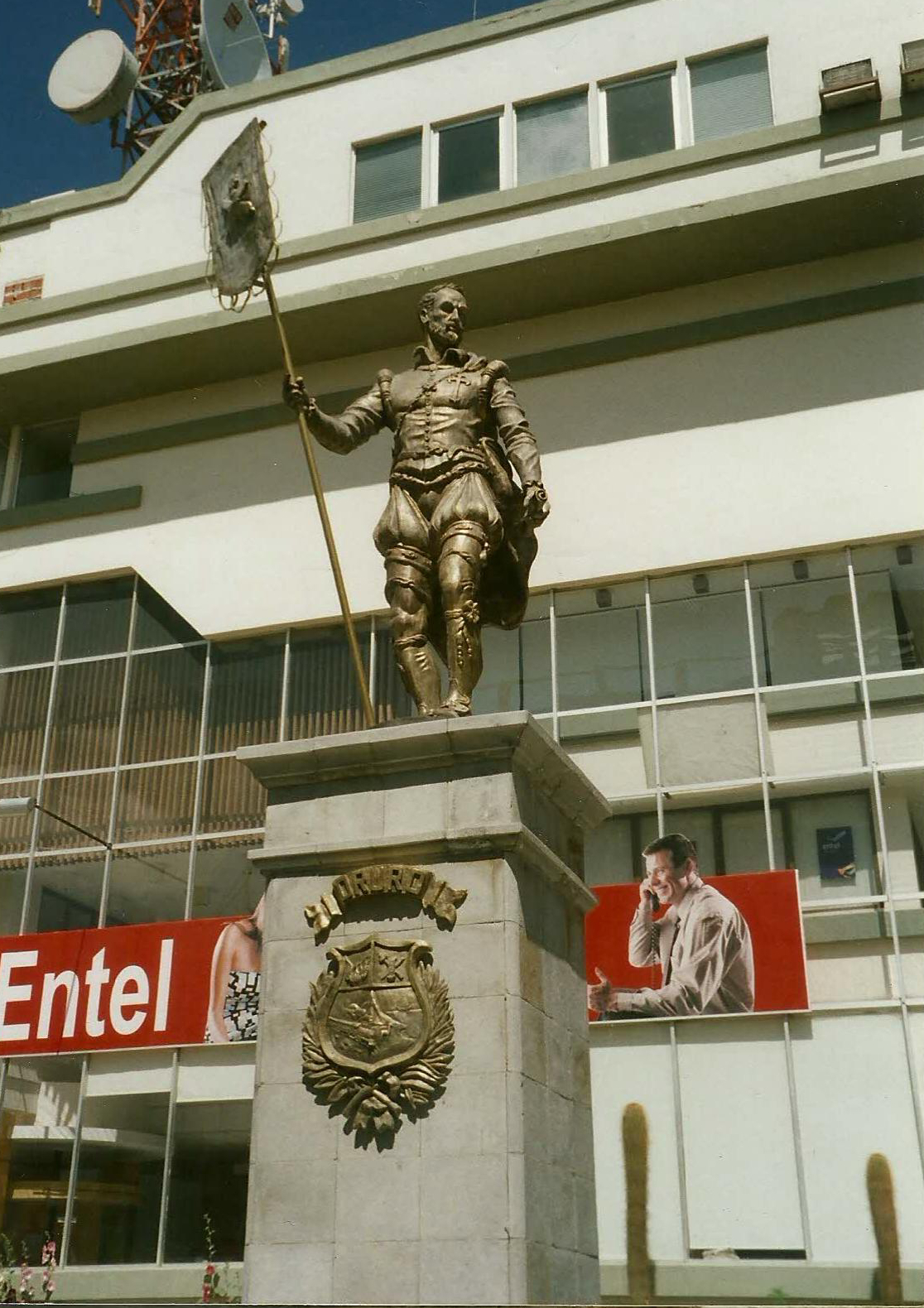
Monument to Manuel de Castro del Castillo y Padilla, founder of the Real Villa de San Felipe de Austria of Oruro

=== Pre-Inca period ===
Little is known about the small Aymara towns of the post-Tiwanaku and pre-Inca period. Apparently, the Incas did not found important cities in the central Altiplano.

What is certain is that when the conquistadors arrived in the Oruro region, the native population was dispersed among hundreds of small settlements.

Before the Incas arrived in what is now the territory of Oruro, the area was successively inhabited by several regional peoples, among whom the Uru people stood out.

After the disappearance of the Tiwanaku Empire, the Aymaras belonging to the Aymara kingdoms subjugated the Uru people. It is worth mentioning that one of the groups that settled near Oruro were the Soras.

=== Inca period ===
Years later, the Incas arrived in the territory and subjugated the different Aymara peoples of the region. The Inca dynasty governed Kollasuyo from Paria, where the Temple of the Sun, buildings, tambos (way stations), and imperial storehouses were built.

=== Viceroyal period ===
When the Spanish conquistadors arrived, they managed to integrate the Inca Empire into the Spanish monarchy. Long before the city of Oruro was founded, the Spaniards had already founded several cities in what is now Bolivian territory: Charcas (1540), Potosí (1545), La Paz (1548), Santa Cruz de la Sierra (1561), Cochabamba (1571), and Tarija (1574). One of the most outstanding characteristics of the viceroyal period was the founding of cities, which occurred for various reasons:

- Evangelization of Indigenous peoples in order, according to Catholic doctrine, to save their souls.
- Establishment of centers for agricultural exploitation of territory.
- Administration of large areas from a legal and political standpoint.
- Exploitation of mining resources.
- Commercial bases and communication links with the metropolis.
- Intermediate stations along commercial routes to supply transportation.
- Military objectives of defense and bridgeheads for deeper penetration into new lands.

In 1535, the informal founding of Paria "La Nueva" or Spanish Paria began under the Extremaduran captain Juan de Saavedra, commander of an advance unit of Diego de Almagro's expeditionary army during its journey to Chile. Had it not been for urgent military needs related to the planned conquest of Cuzco, Paria could have become the first permanent nucleus in the territory that would later form the Audiencia of Charcas, the first town founded by the Spaniards.

Between 1535 and 1564, Spanish exploration of the territories of the province of Paria began in search of silver and gold mines.

In 1565, the wealthy captain Lorenzo de Aldana—whose name is associated with the legend of his "buried treasure"—was granted the encomienda of Paria. He rediscovered silver-bearing mines and exploited them.

In 1568, Diego Alemán submitted the first request for a mining claim in the Uru-Uru mountain range (present-day Oruro).

=== 17th century ===
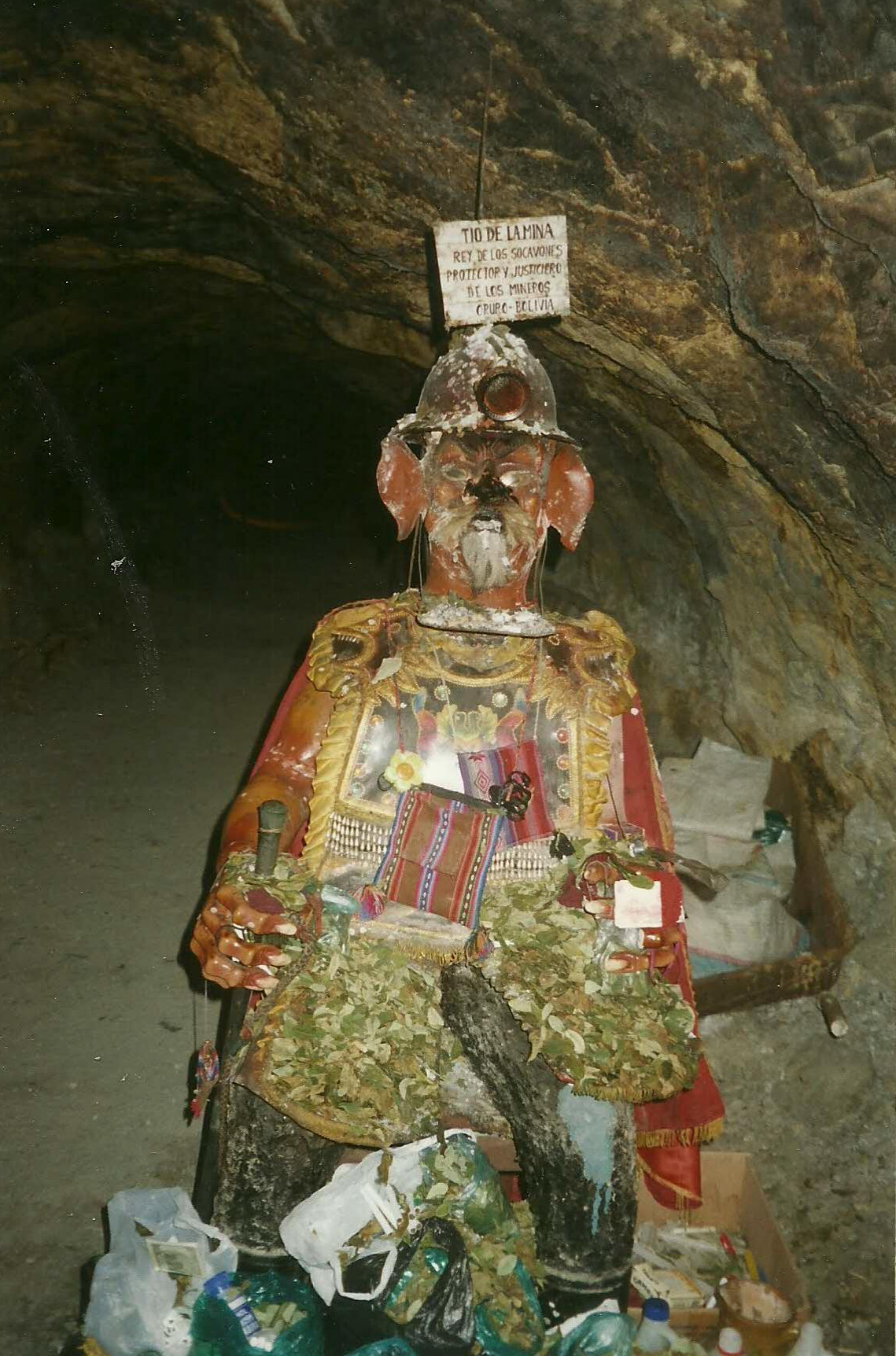
The tío de la mina (“uncle of the mine”), as miners believed, brought good luck in extracting large quantities of ore. This image can be seen in the San José Mine, which has been converted into a mineralogy museum.

Around 1605, the priest of Colquemarca, Francisco Medrano, and other Spaniards discovered rich silver deposits in a hill in the Uru region, which they named San Cristóbal. The city was founded on November 1, 1606, as a silver mining center, under the responsibility of Licentiate Manuel de Castro del Castillo y Padilla, judge of the Royal Audiencia of Charcas. It was named Real Villa de San Felipe de Austria in honor of King Philip III of Spain, grandson of Emperor Charles V of the Holy Roman Empire.

It was one of the Spanish towns of the Audiencia of Charcas (present-day Bolivia) that was designed by engineers in a grid pattern, following the classic European urban layouts of the time (17th century). To this end, the hamlets built at the end of the 16th century were ordered to be demolished.

At the time of its founding, Oruro had a population of 15,000 inhabitants, including Spanish miners, Creoles, Africans, and Indigenous people of the Uru, Quechua, and Aymara ethnic groups.

Fluctuations in silver prices in subsequent centuries conditioned the demographic and urban growth or decline of the town.

In 1605, the increasingly wealthy silver miners of San Miguel de Uru Uru requested authorization from the Audiencia of Charcas to found a town at the site. The Audiencia ordered Captain Gonzalo Paredes de Hinojosa, corregidor of the Villa of Salinas del Río (Mizque), to inspect the region in order to determine whether the requested founding was justified—a procedure not followed in the founding of Potosí, La Plata, Nuestra Señora de La Paz, Oropeza (Cochabamba), Santa Cruz de la Sierra, and other Spanish towns.

In July 1606, the Audiencia of Charcas commissioned Judge Manuel de Castro del Castillo y Padilla to verify whether the mining settlement of San Miguel de Uru Uru met the regulatory conditions for the founding of a town.

On November 1, 1606, the founding of the Real Villa de San Felipe de Austria was initiated by Judge Manuel de Castro del Castillo y Padilla, who traveled to the settlement of San Miguel, next to Pie de Gallo hill, to carry out the founding. The name was given in honor of the reigning monarch of Spain and to commemorate the transfer of the royal court from Valladolid to Madrid. Jerónimo Ondegardo, an encomendero resident, was appointed first ordinary mayor; the bachelor priest Francisco Medrano, first settler and discoverer of the mines, was appointed second ordinary mayor. Alonso de Mendoza Inojossa, an encomendero resident of La Plata, was appointed Royal Standard Bearer, and Manuel de Torres Villavicencio was appointed Chief Constable.

In 1607, the commissioner sent by the Audiencia of Charcas arrived directly in the Villa Felipe de Godoy to gather information on the economic conditions and life in the newly founded town. His report to the Audiencia, entitled relación de siento, minas y población de la Villa de San Felipe de Austria, llamados Oruro (Account of the site, mines, and population of the Villa of San Felipe de Austria, called Oruro), became the first chronicle of the town, and he its first chronicler.

By 1618, the town was inhabited by thousands of Spaniards and a large Indigenous population. According to Vásquez de Espinoza, in its surroundings there were 20 ore-processing mills dedicated to refining minerals extracted from the surrounding hills. This mining district was expanded to include the populations of Paria and Berenguela.

Between 1608 and 1675, there was an extraordinary extraction of silver and prospecting of other mines, with settlements of Creoles, natives from other towns, and Europeans. By mid-century, churches and convents had been built, such as those of San Francisco, Santo Domingo, San Agustín, La Merced, La Compañía, as well as a hospital for the sick run by the Brothers of St. John of God.

In 1678, a census recorded 75,920 inhabitants in the town, of whom 37,960 were Spaniards and Creoles, with the rest being Indigenous people, making it at that time the second-largest city in Upper Peru. From 1680 onward, silver mining entered a period of stagnation and decline.

=== 18th-century ===
In 1739, Juan Vélez de Córdova issued the Manifesto of Grievances, which laid the foundation for the first attempt at insurrection in the town, though it failed due to betrayal.

That same year, the Creole Juan Vélez de Córdova led a rebellion against the Spanish Empire. His Manifesto of Grievances was a document of great political value and for a long time served as a model for conspiracies in the Audiencia of Charcas, especially the Oruro Rebellion of 1781.

=== Rebellion of Oruro (1781) ===
On February 10, 1781, in the Real Villa of San Felipe de Austria (Oruro), one of the libertarian cries of Latin America took place, continuing the rebellions against the Spanish Crown. On that occasion, the uprising led by Sebastián Pagador, Jacinto Rodríguez de Herrera, and other leaders issued the solemn proclamation:

"Amigos paisanos y compañeros: en ninguna ocasión podemos dar mejores pruebas de nuestro amor a la patria, sino en ésta, no estimemos en nada nuestras vidas, sacrifiquémosla gustosos en defensa de la libertad".

“Friends, compatriots, and companions: on no occasion can we give better proof of our love for the homeland than on this one; let us value our lives as nothing, and gladly sacrifice them in defense of liberty.”

The libertarian rebellion was led by Jacinto Rodríguez de Herrera. Sebastián Pagador played a prominent role until he lost his life during an Indigenous uprising. The rebellion was suppressed by the Spanish Crown in 1783, after Viceroy Juan José de Vértiz y Salcedo ordered a secret summary investigation, sending the main rebels to Buenos Aires, then the capital of the Viceroyalty of the Río de la Plata.

In 1789, the image of the Virgin of Candelaria (Virgin of the Socavón) officially appeared in a cavity of the Pie de Gallo hill.

In January 1793, a process began to gather informational material on the virtues of the Franciscan friar Juan Espinoza, aimed at his beatification.

=== War of Independence ===
In 1803, the secular town council (cabildo) and other authorities submitted a petition to King Charles IV, requesting confirmation of the founding of the town and the granting of a coat of arms, among other privileges. In 1806, the British invasion of Buenos Aires began. The defeat and expulsion of the invaders were celebrated in the Filipense town with great festivities, as in the other towns of Charcas. Oruro sent to Buenos Aires a plaque or sheet forged in gold and repoussé silver, as a token of gratitude and praise for the victory over the British.

In 1809, the independence revolutions began in Chuquisaca and La Paz, marking the start of what became known as the War of Independence. On October 6, 1810, the population of the town of San Felipe de Austria rose up in arms, led by Tomás Barrón, in a libertarian declaration against Spanish domination and in support of the patriots of Cochabamba. On December 27, 1810, the patriot lieutenant colonel Eustoquio Díaz Vélez, commanding the vanguard of the Army of the North of the United Provinces of the Río de la Plata, entered the town with the apparent approval of the population.

In 1814, the destruction of the fortress began—a viceregal building used as a prison, barracks, and police headquarters, alternately by royalists and patriots. It was later precariously rebuilt and eventually demolished. The Bolivian soldier José Santos Vargas, known as Tambor, began writing a campaign diary that would become the only chronicle of the struggles in the western and valley regions of Bolivia. Oruro was an important royalist center throughout the war of independence. After the Battle of Falsuri, in which the patriot colonel José Miguel Lanza was defeated by the royalist general Pedro Antonio Olañeta, the latter departed with his army to establish his headquarters in Oruro.

Near the end of the war, on February 9, 1825, General Antonio José de Sucre issued in the city of La Paz the decree convening a General Assembly of the provinces of Upper Peru to decide their future, to be held in the town of Oruro. The assembly did not meet there due to the advanced age of some representatives from Chuquisaca, Cochabamba, and Santa Cruz, who cited “distance and poor climate conditions.” The historic assembly ultimately deliberated in Chuquisaca between April 10 and August 6, during which the Republic of Bolívar—today Bolivia—was founded.

=== Republican period ===
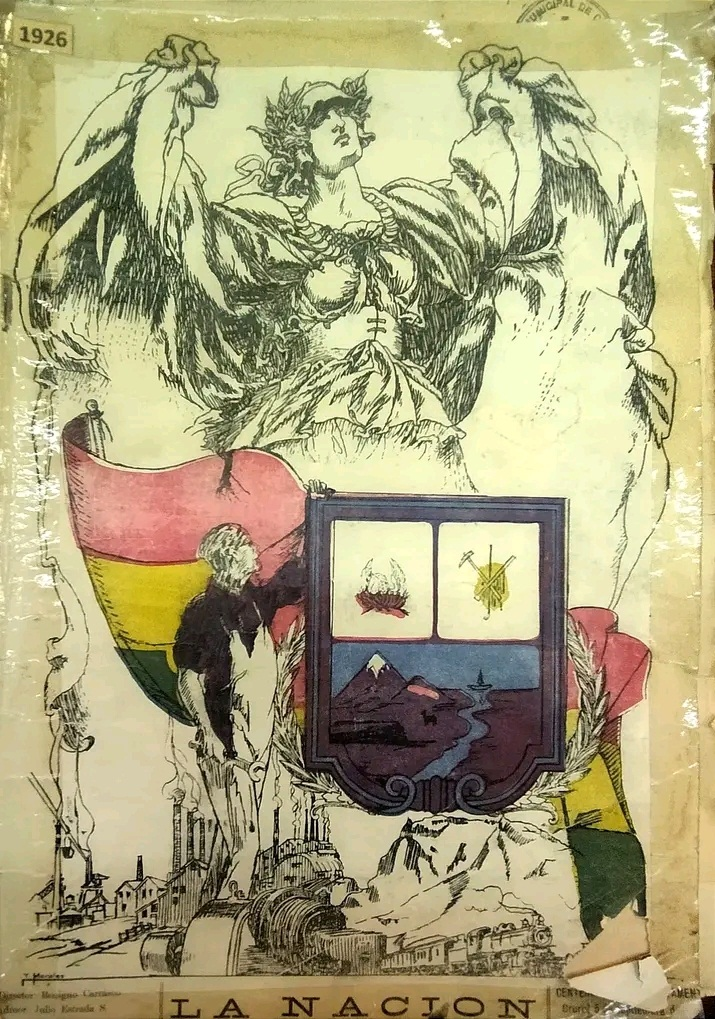
Commemorative publication of the newspaper La Nación dedicated to the department of Oruro on its centennial in 1926

On September 5, 1826, the Department of Oruro was created, composed of the provinces of Oruro, Paria, and Carangas. The city of Oruro was established as the departmental capital, and the viceregal name "Villa San Felipe de Austria" was discarded.

On December 11, 1826, the College of Sciences and Arts was founded. It began operating in 1827 and was later renamed the Simón Bolívar National College. At that time, the city's population reached 8,000 inhabitants. For a period, the tin mine La Salvadora was the most important source of this mineral in the world.

Gradually, this resource was also depleted, and the city of Oruro entered another period of decline. Nevertheless, the city attracts national and international tourists to its carnival, considered one of the largest folkloric events in South America thanks to its traditional dances, with the Diablada being one of the most famous and acclaimed.

=== 21st-century ===
On March 13, 2020, the city of Oruro became the first city in Bolivia to enter quarantine for the first time in its history, due to the coronavirus pandemic.

== Geography ==
The city of Oruro is located in the highlands of Bolivia, on the Andean Altiplano at an elevation of 3,735 meters above sea level. Administratively, the city of Oruro is part of the municipality of the same name, in the center of the Cercado Province, in the northeast of the department of Oruro. It borders the municipality of Soracachi to the north and east, the municipality of Machacamarca in the province of Dalence to the south, the municipality of El Choro to the southwest and west, and the municipality of Caracollo to the northwest.

Within the municipality of Oruro, two physiographic units can be found: mountain ranges (serranías) and the plateau (altiplanicie). The mountain ranges are located mainly in the western part of the municipality, with the main hills being Rubiales (3,971 m), Alamasi (3,977 m), San Pedro (4,012 m), and San Felipe (4,032 m). Mount San Felipe serves as a natural viewpoint over the city and is the highest point in the municipality of Oruro.

== Climate ==
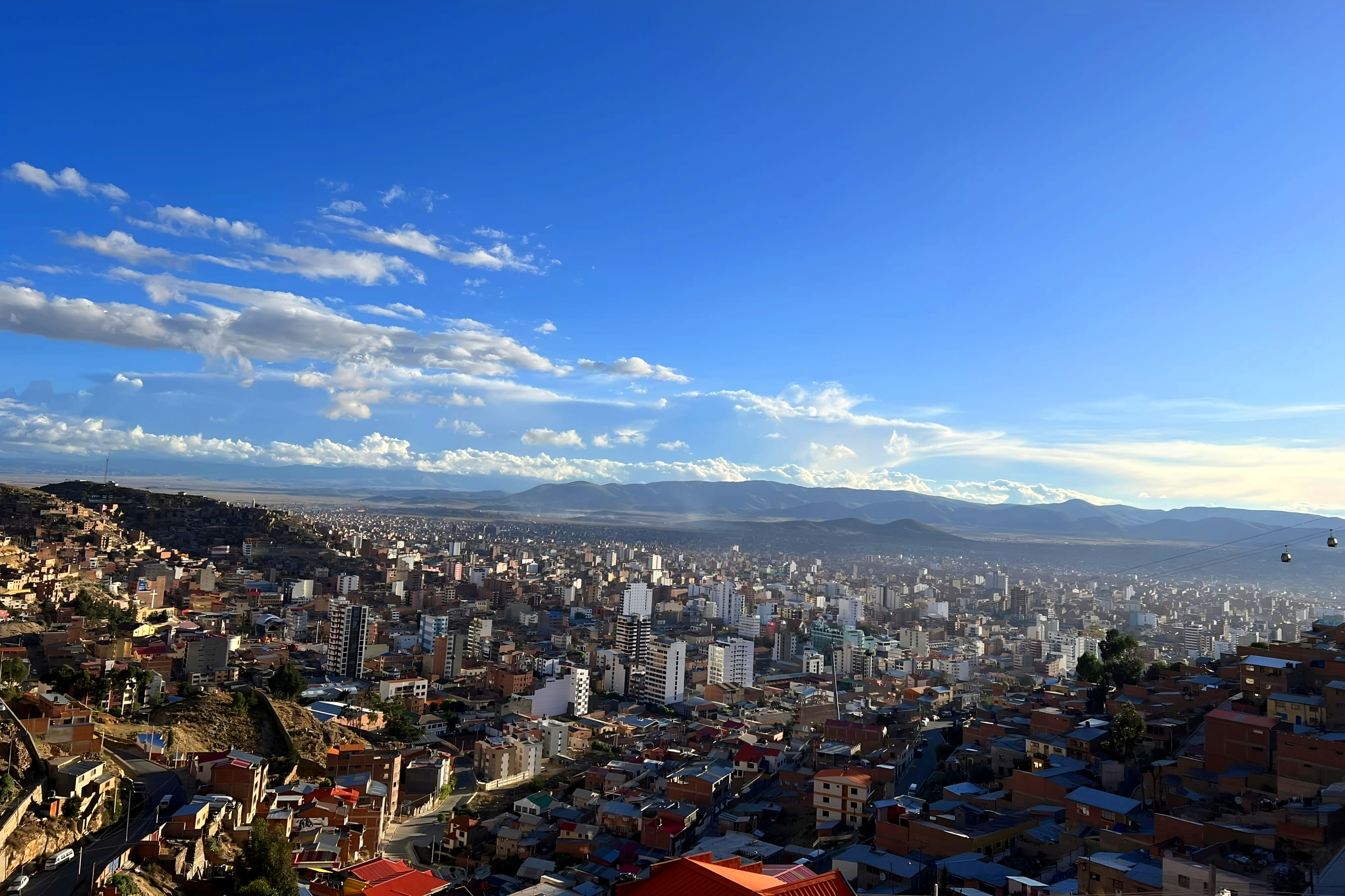
Panoramic view of Oruro

Oruro lies north of the salty lakes Uru Uru and Poopó. It is three hours (by vehicle) from La Paz. Located at an altitude of 3709 meters above sea level, Oruro is well known for its cold weather. Warmer temperatures generally take place during August, September and October, after the worst of the winter chills and before the summer rains. From May to early July, night-time temperatures combined with a cold wind can bring the temperature down to well below freezing. Summers are warmer, and, although it is an arid area, it has considerable rainfall between November and March. The city features a subtropical highland climate (Köppen: Cwb, Trewartha: Dolk). Due to the warm days and dry winters, snow is not a frequent occurrence as much as the bitter cold (especially at night); however, flurries can fall usually once every few years, most recently July 4, 2015. The other three most recent snowfalls were those of 13 June 2013, 1 September 2010 (with accumulation), as well as one in 2008.

Climate data for Oruro (Juan Mendoza Airport) (1958-2022)
Month	Jan	Feb	Mar	Apr	May	Jun	Jul	Aug	Sep	Oct	Nov	Dec	Year
Record high °C (°F)	26.6 (79.9)	30.8 (87.4)	30.8 (87.4)	30.3 (86.5)	24.7 (76.5)	21.4 (70.5)	21.4 (70.5)	22.8 (73.0)	26.2 (79.2)	33.6 (92.5)	30.2 (86.4)	27.6 (81.7)	33.6 (92.5)
Mean daily maximum °C (°F)	19.2 (66.6)	19.0 (66.2)	19.4 (66.9)	19.3 (66.7)	17.3 (63.1)	15.9 (60.6)	16.1 (61.0)	17.5 (63.5)	18.9 (66.0)	20.6 (69.1)	21.2 (70.2)	20.4 (68.7)	18.7 (65.7)
Daily mean °C (°F)	12.3 (54.1)	12.1 (53.8)	11.9 (53.4)	10.1 (50.2)	6.7 (44.1)	4.8 (40.6)	5.0 (41.0)	6.7 (44.1)	8.9 (48.0)	10.9 (51.6)	12.2 (54.0)	12.5 (54.5)	9.5 (49.1)
Mean daily minimum °C (°F)	5.4 (41.7)	5.2 (41.4)	4.3 (39.7)	0.9 (33.6)	−3.9 (25.0)	−6.3 (20.7)	−6.1 (21.0)	−4.1 (24.6)	−1.2 (29.8)	1.3 (34.3)	3.3 (37.9)	4.6 (40.3)	0.3 (32.5)
Record low °C (°F)	−4.0 (24.8)	−2.1 (28.2)	−4.0 (24.8)	−10.0 (14.0)	−12.8 (9.0)	−14.0 (6.8)	−13.9 (7.0)	−13.9 (7.0)	−12.3 (9.9)	−9.3 (15.3)	−6.4 (20.5)	−5.3 (22.5)	−14.0 (6.8)
Average precipitation mm (inches)	136.9 (5.39)	137.7 (5.42)	92.4 (3.64)	58.8 (2.31)	33.4 (1.31)	30.7 (1.21)	26.9 (1.06)	43.3 (1.70)	64.0 (2.52)	47.4 (1.87)	60.9 (2.40)	113.2 (4.46)	845.6 (33.29)
Average precipitation days (≥ 1 mm)	18.9	16.7	16.7	10.7	6.4	4.8	6.4	8.6	11.5	10.4	11.9	16.7	139.7
Source: NOAA

== Economy ==
While traditionally based upon mining, Oruro has become increasingly popular for tourism since the late 20th century. In the early 21st century, Oruro's economy grew through trade and economic connections with Chile, especially for exporting products to Pacific markets. It transported products by road through Chile to the Pacific port of Iquique to open new connections to external markets; it also used the rail connection through Uyuni to the port at Antofagasta for exports. Thanks to increased road building, Oruro has become important as a waystation on the overland route of goods from the Atlantic port of Santos, Brazil, through Puerto Suárez and Santa Cruz to the capital, La Paz.

== Transportation ==
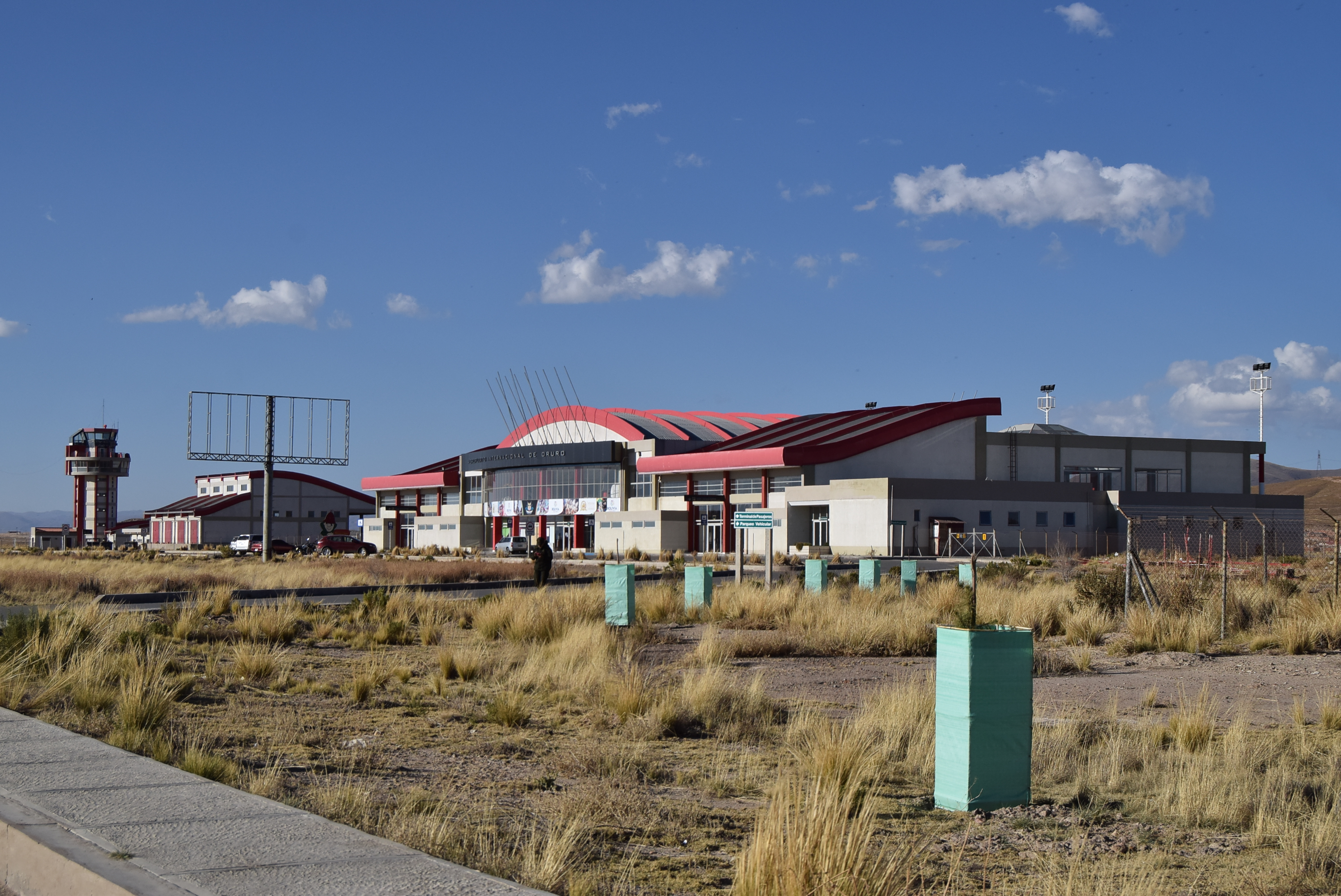
Juan Mendoza Airport

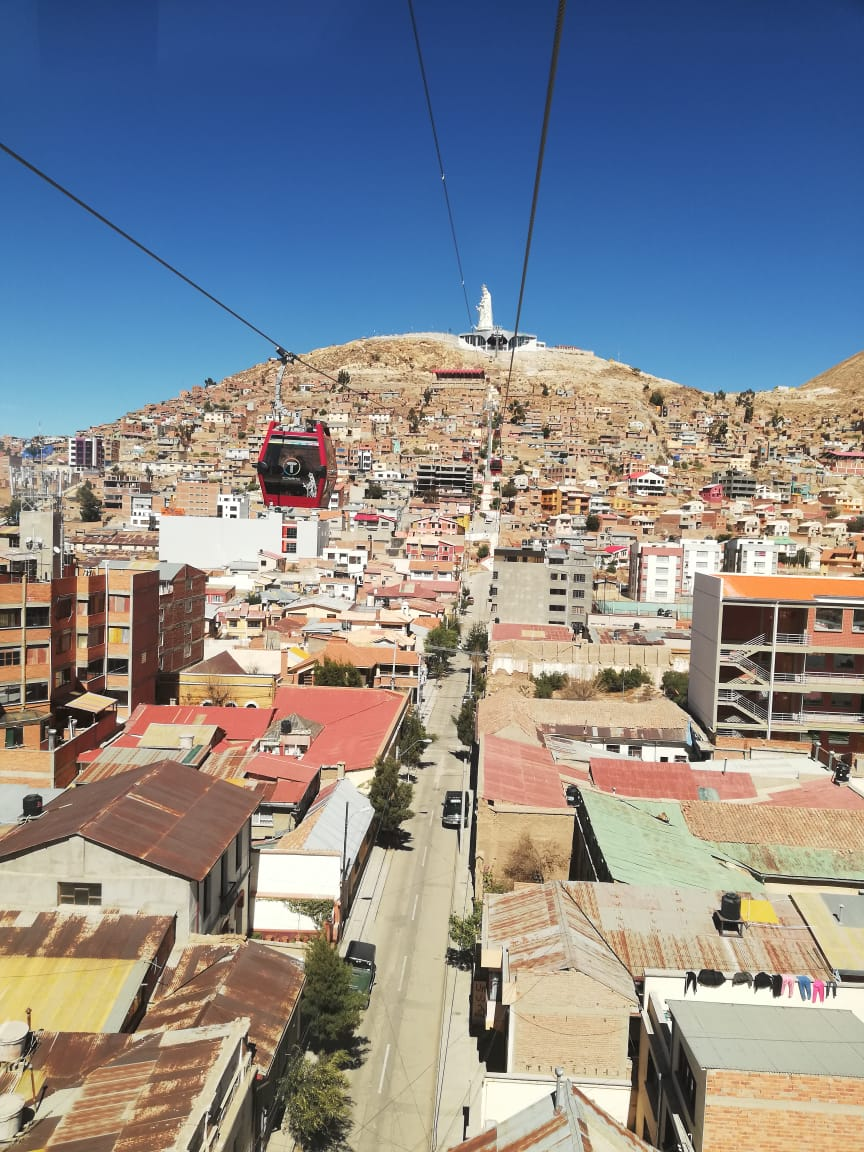
Monument to the Virgin of Socavón ascending by cable car

The Juan Mendoza International Airport is the only air terminal serving the city of Oruro. It was inaugurated and opened in 2013 and features a 4-kilometer runway, two taxiways, and a passenger terminal. It has a low level of traffic, with one to three flights per day, amounting to approximately 15 flights per week, and is served exclusively by the country’s flag carrier, Boliviana de Aviación.

In February 2018, the Santuario Virgen del Socavón cable car was inaugurated in the city of Oruro. It connects the monument to the Virgin of Candelaria on Santa Bárbara Hill with Folklore Square. It was built as a tourist transportation system, with a capacity to transport 1,000 passengers per hour, distributed across 16 cabins.

== Culture and education ==
Despite its economic decline, the city attracts numerous tourists to its Carnaval de Oruro, considered one of the great folkloric events in South America for its masked "diablada" and Anata. The Oruru Carnival was discovered in 1559, when the Augustinian priests were on the land, the festival is in honor of the Virgin of Candlemas.

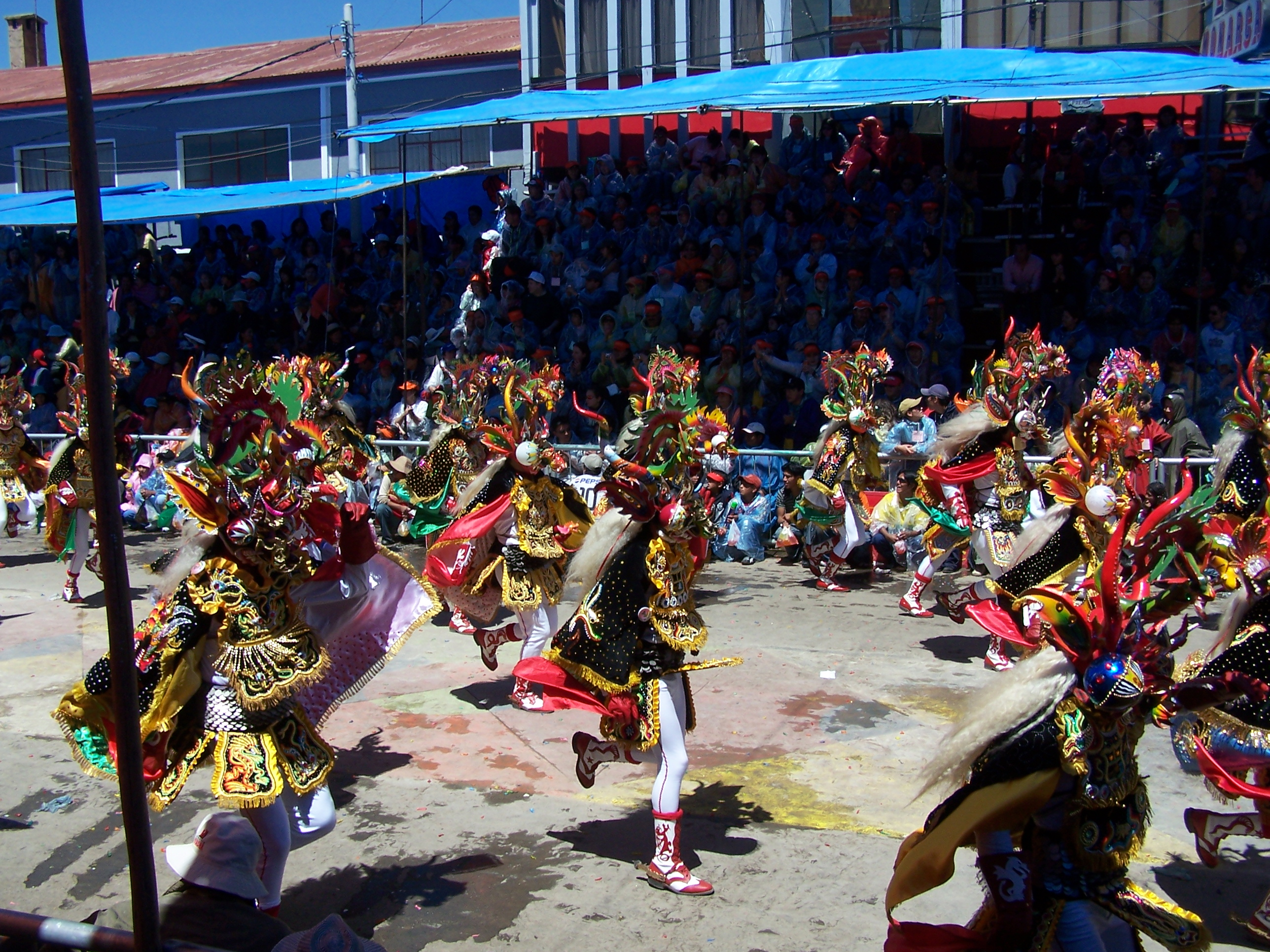
Carnaval de Oruro, Bolivia, 2007

The Oruro Symphony Orchestra is based in the city. Aymara painter and printmaker Alejandro Mario Yllanes (1913–1960) was born here.

The Universidad Técnica de Oruro, noted for its engineering school, is located in Oruro.

== Main attractions ==
- Museo Patiño, former residence of "tin baron" Simón Iturri Patiño
- Museo Mineralógico (Mineralogical Museum): has exhibits of precious stones, minerals, and fossils
- Museo Etnográfico Minero (Ethnographical Mining Museum): housed in a mine tunnel, depicts methods of Bolivian mining
- Museo Nacional Antropológico Eduardo López Rivas (National Anthropological Museum): displays tools and information on the Chipaya and Uru tribes, and about Carnaval de Oruro.
- Churches: Catedral Nuestra Señora de la Asunción, Santuario de la Virgen del Socavón, Iglesia de Cunchupata
- Inti Raymi, a mine

== Education ==
The city is home to the public Technical University of Oruro, as well as primary and secondary education institutions. Among the most notable educational institutions is Unidad Educativa Simón Bolívar, founded in 1826 under the name Liceo de Ciencias y Arte. Also noteworthy is the German School (Colegio Alemán), which celebrated its 100th anniversary in 2023, along with other public and private institutions. For access to literary works, the city has the Marcos Beltrán Ávila Municipal Library, which reopened in July 2022.

== Sport ==
The most popular sport in both the country and the city is football (soccer). The sport arrived in Bolivia through the expansion of the Chilean railway, when in 1892 workers of the Antofagasta (Chile) and Bolivia Railway Co. Ltd. were the first to practice it. Under this influence, Oruro Royal Club was founded in 1896 and is considered the first football club in the history of Bolivia.

In 1954, Club San José permanently joined national tournaments organized by the La Paz Football Association and competed in Bolivia’s top division (formerly known as the Bolivian Professional Football League). The club has won the national championship four times: 1955, 1995, 2007, and 2018. It is currently a member of the Oruro Football Association, where it competes in annual championships to qualify for the Copa Simón Bolívar – Nacional B.

The city’s main sports venue is the Jesús Bermúdez Stadium. The stadium, where San José usually plays its home matches, has a seating capacity of 33,300 spectators and is owned by the regional government.

== Gallery ==
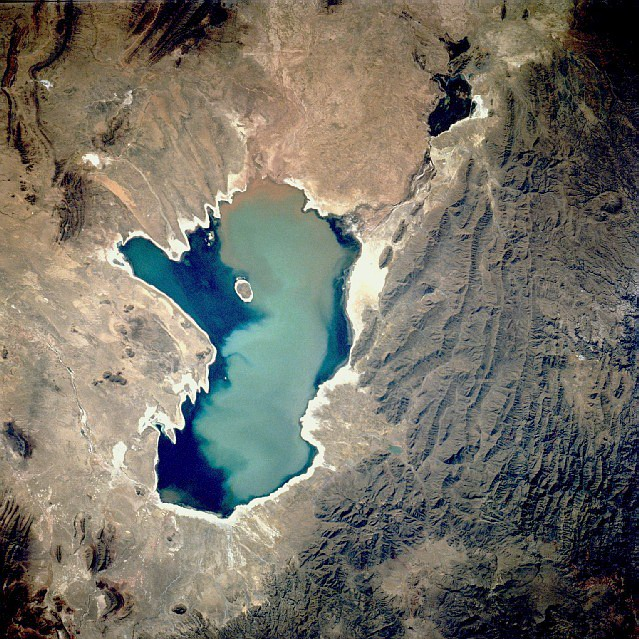
Lake Poopó, Bolivia

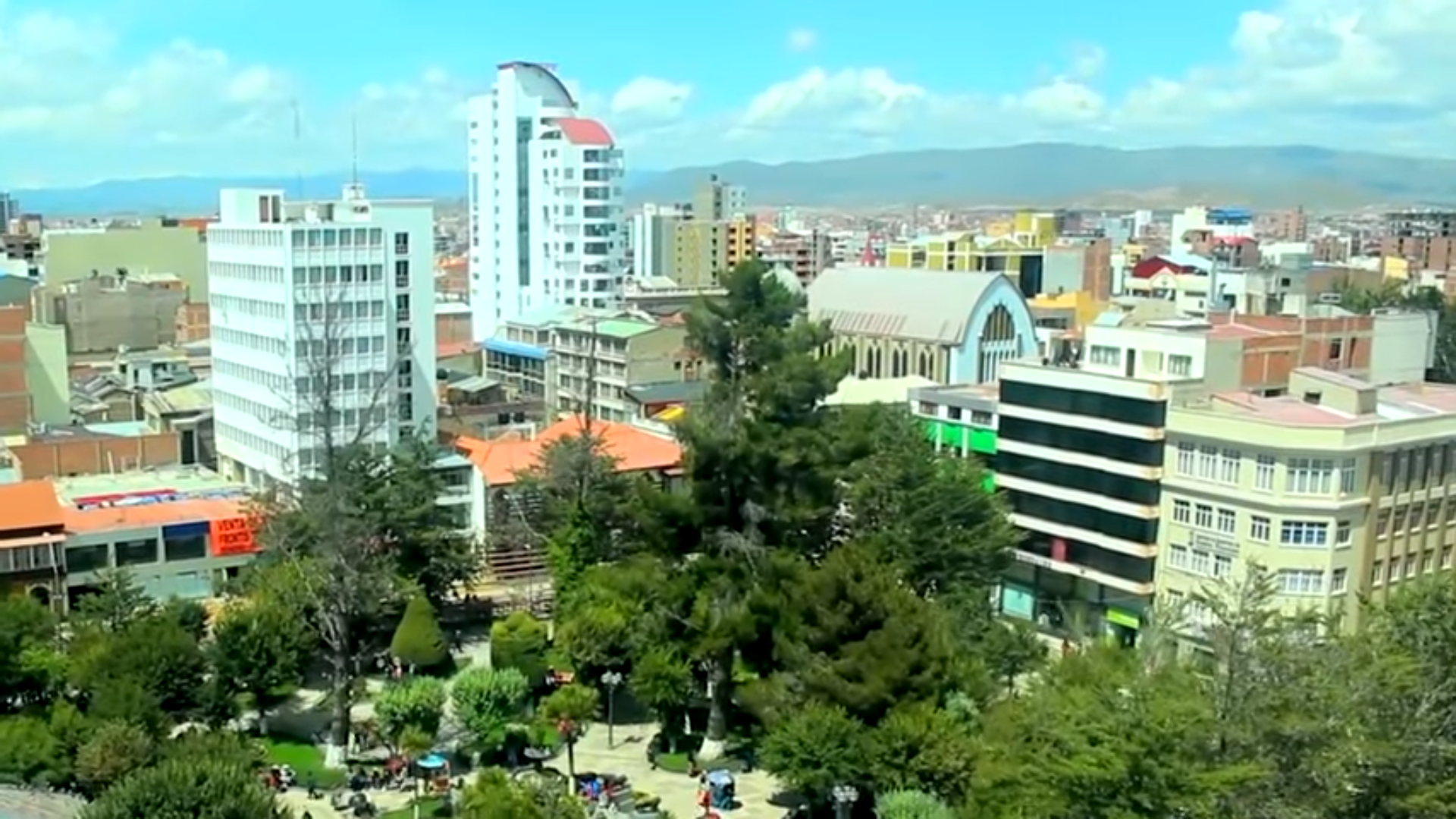
Downtown Oruro, Bolivia

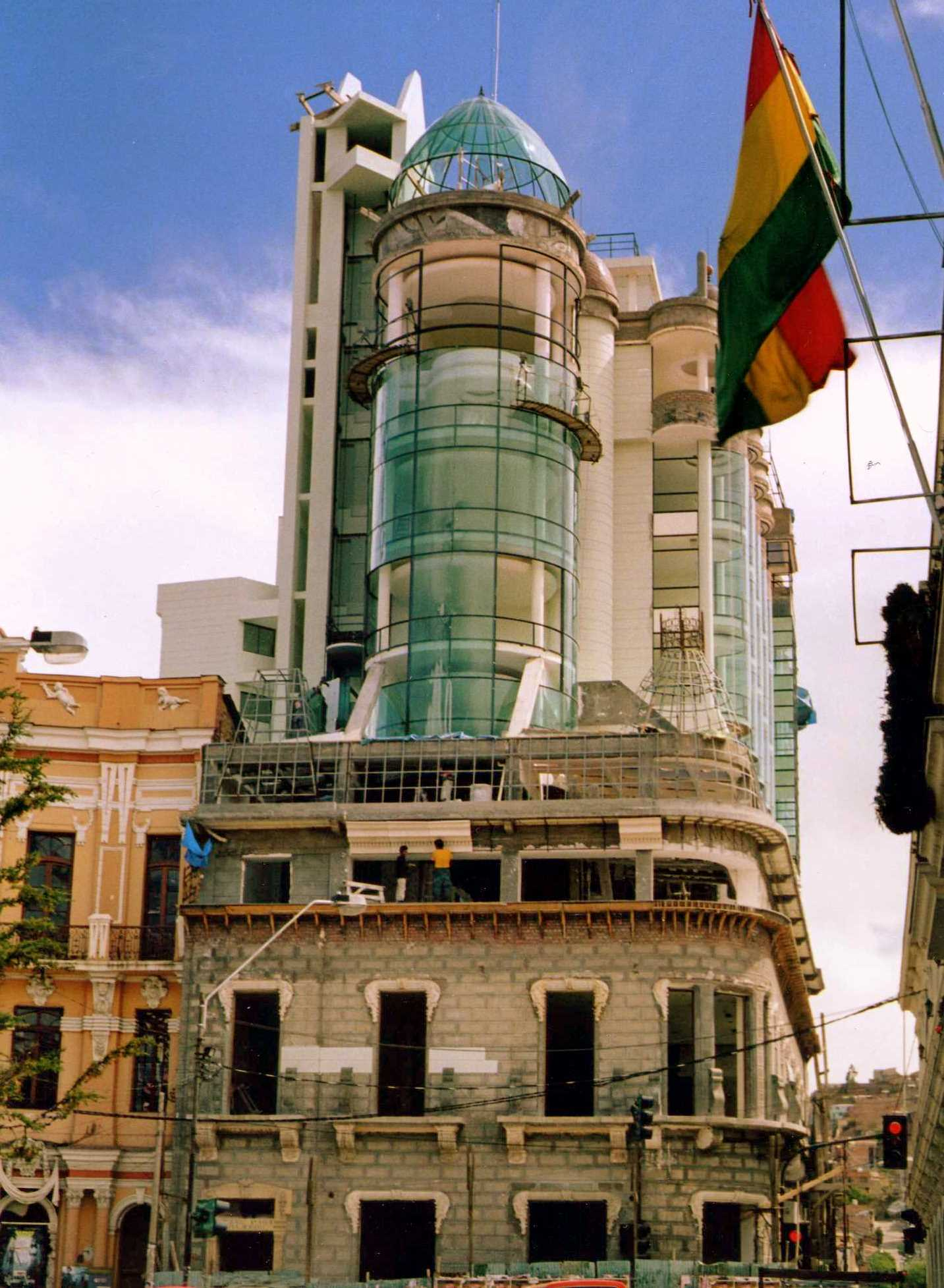
Oruro, Bolivia

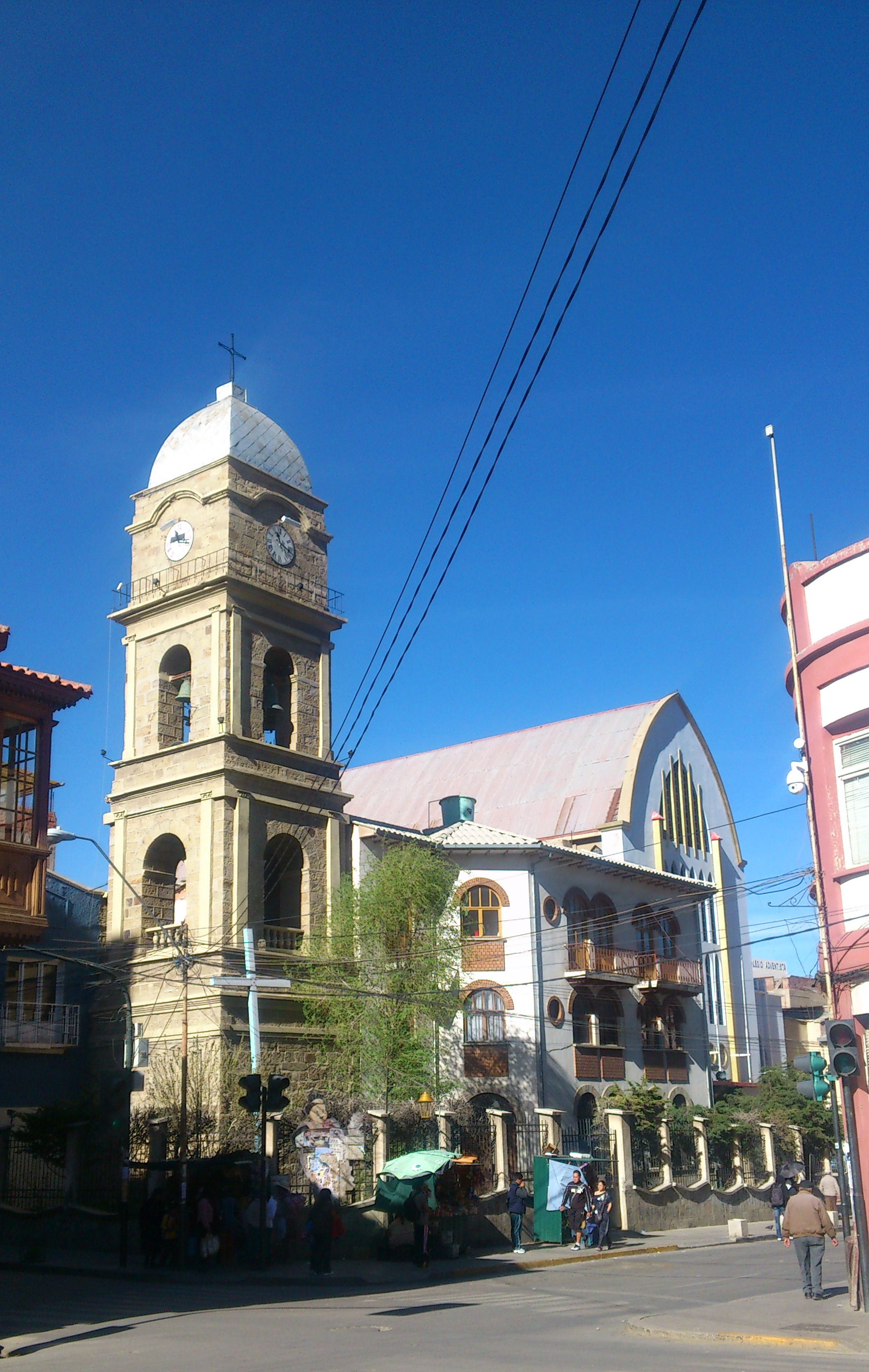
Oruro Cathedral

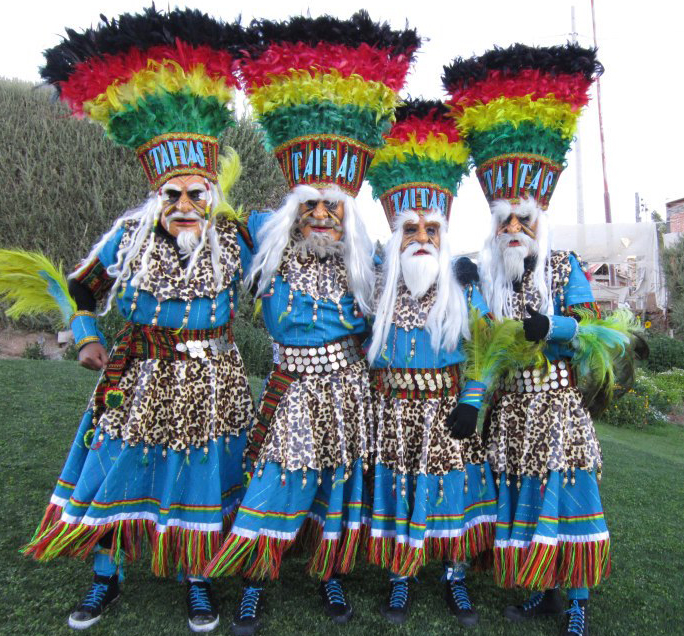
Taitas de Oruro

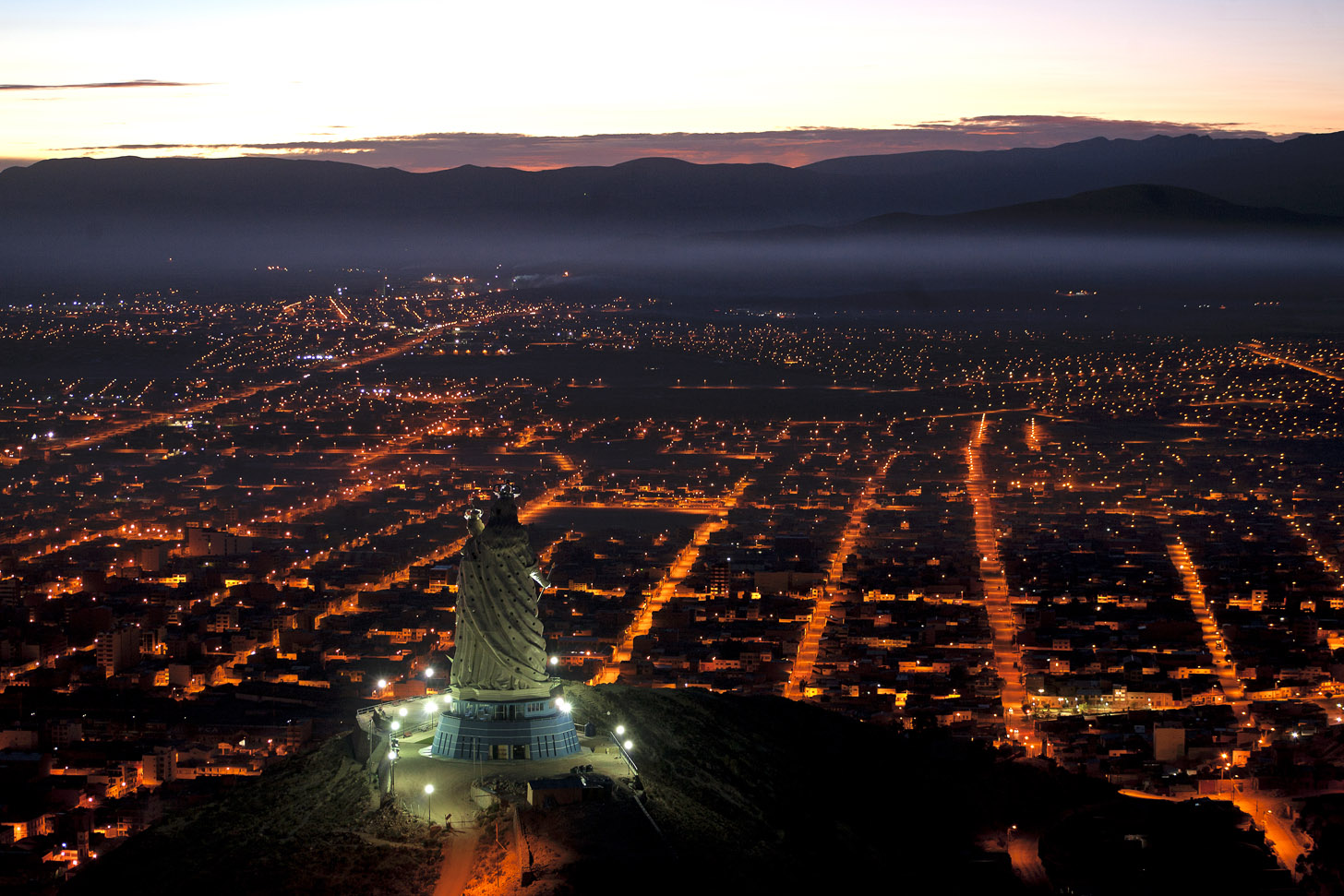
Monumento a la Virgen Candelaria, Oruro, Bolivia

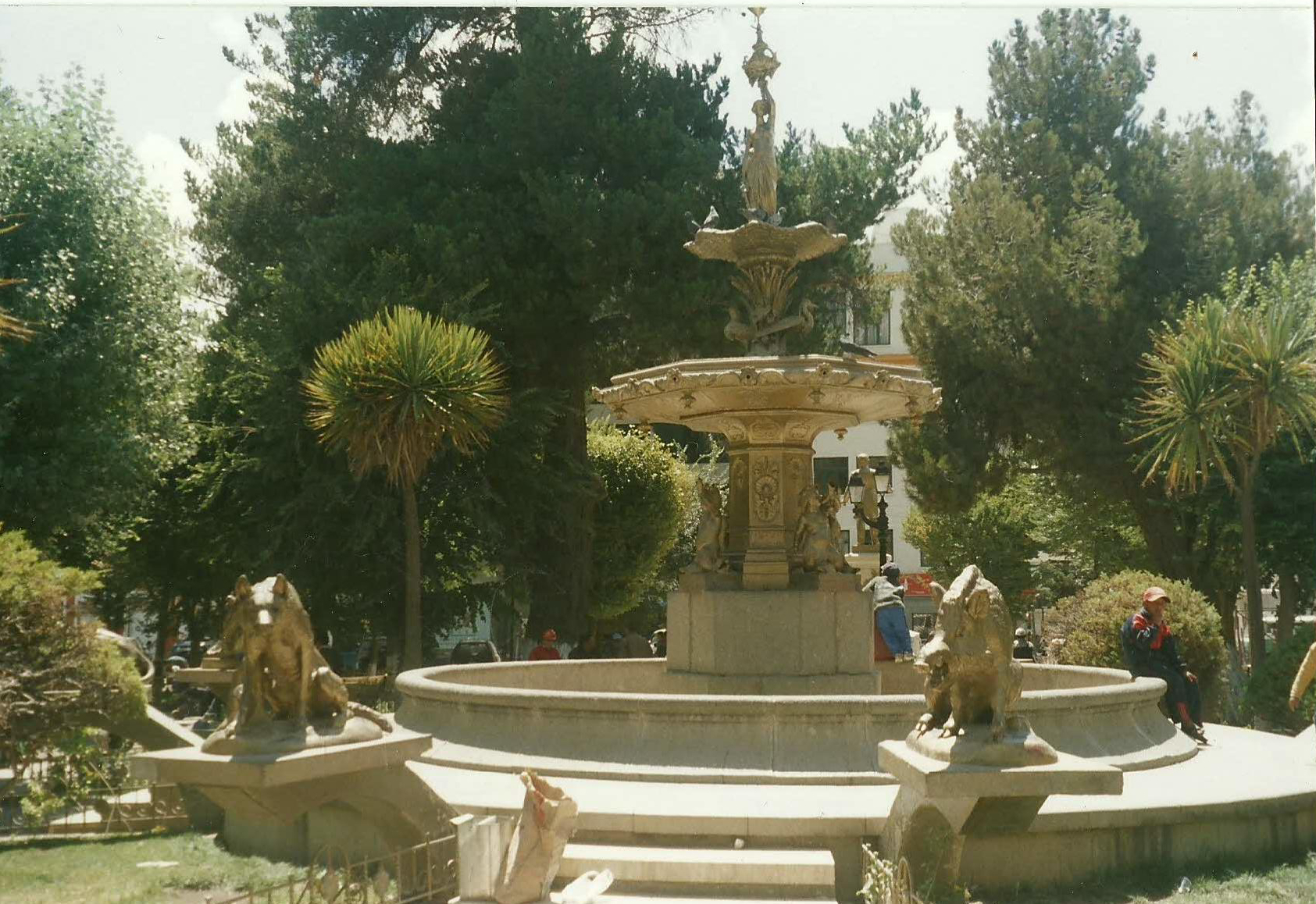
Plaza 10 de Febrero, Oruro

== Twin towns – sister cities ==
- Lima, Peru
- Iquique, Chile
- Calama, Chile

== Notable people from Oruro ==
- Elsa Cladera de Bravo (1922–2005), trade union leader
- Hilda Mundy (1912–1980), writer, poet and journalist
- Rajka Baković (1920–1941), Croatian student and a member of the anti-fascist resistance movement
- Gery Vargas (born 1981), FIFA football referee

== See also ==
- Jach'a Ch'ankha
- Qala Qala
