= Flores (surname) =

Flores is a Spanish, Italian and Portuguese surname.

== History ==
In Spain, the surname Flores is first found in the Kingdom of Asturias, where the Visigothic royal court took refuge after the Muslim Invasion of the Iberian Peninsula in 711. In its origin, it is a patronymic of the Visigothic given name Fruela or Froila.

In Italy, the surname's roots can be traced back to the Kingdom of Naples around the early 14th century where records show a Flores family receiving land grants in the feudal territories of Persano and Sandionisio.

== Variations ==
Spelling variations of this surname also include Fruélaz, Fruelaz, Froílaz, Froilaz, Florez, Flórez, Floriz, Flóriz, Floraz, Flóraz, Flor, Florán, Floran and Florián, among others.

Variations can also be found in several Florez coat-of-arms designs. The one similar feature many of these designs have in common is the fleur-de-lis, usually on a blue field, though varying in number from three to five, and possibly used in conjunction with other symbols.

== People with the surname ==
=== A ===
- Adam Flores (born 1970), Mexican boxer
- Ágnel Flores (born 1989), Venezuelan footballer
- Alberto Flores Galindo (1949–1990), Peruvian intellectual
- Alexander Flores (born 1990), American boxer
- Alfred Flores (1916–2009), Guamanian politician
- Alexis Flores (born 1975), Honduran former fugitive
- Armando Flores, Mexican musician
- Ana María Flores (born 1952), Bolivian engineer, businesswoman and politician
- Andrés Flores (born 1990), Salvadoran footballer
- Andrés Flores (composer) (fl. 1680–1712), Bolivian composer
- Angel Flores, American powerlifter
- Anitere Flores (born 1976), Florida state senator
- April Flores (born 1976), American pornographic actress
- Arles Flores (born 1991), Venezuelan footballer
- Arturo Flores Grande (born 1965), Mexican politician

=== B ===
- Bella Flores (1929–2013), Filipino actress
- Benjamín Flores (1984–2009), Mexican boxer
- Benjamin Flores Jr. (born 2002), American actor and rapper
- Bill Flores (born 1954), American politician
- BJ Flores (born 1979), American boxer
- Brenda Flores (runner) (born 1991), Mexican long-distance runner
- Brenda Mercedes Flores (born 1969), Honduran politician
- Brian Flores (born 1981), American football coach

=== C ===
- Carlos Flores (disambiguation)
- Ceci Flores Armenta, Mexican missing persons activist
- César Flores Maldonado (born 1963), Mexican economist and politician
- Charles Flores (1970–2012), Cuban-born American jazz bassist
- Charly Flores (born 1997), American soccer player
- Che Flores (born 1979), American basketball referee
- Chris Flores (disambiguation)
- Christine Flores, birth name of Christina Milian, American recording artist, actress, and dancer
- Cilia Flores (born 1953), Venezuelan lawyer and politician
- Cirilo B. Flores (1948–2014), Roman Catholic bishop of San Diego, California, United States
- Claudio Flores (born 1976), Uruguayan footballer
- Consuelo Flores (born 1962), Ecuadorian lawyer and politician
- Cornelia Flores (born 1962), Bolivian politician
- Cristian Flores (born 1988), Mexican footballer
- Cristián Flores (born 1972), Chilean footballer

=== D ===
- Dan Flores (born 1948), historian of the American West
- Dan Flores (American football) (born 1977), American football player
- Daniel Flores (disambiguation)
- Darío Flores (born 1984), Uruguayan footballer
- David Flores (disambiguation)
- Demián Flores (born 1971), Mexican artist
- Dennis Flores (activist), Puerto Rican activist
- Dennis Flores (born 1993), American soccer player
- Deybi Flores (born 1996), Honduran footballer
- Diana Flores (born 1997), Mexican flag football player
- Diego Flores (chess player) (born 1982), Argentine chess grandmaster
- Dylan Flores (born 1993), Costa Rican footballer

=== E ===
- Édgar Flores (actor), Honduran actor
- Édgar Flores Galván (born 1961), Mexican politician
- Edgar Flores (politician) (born 1986), American politician
- Edison Flores (born 1994), Peruvian footballer
- Eduardo Flores (1944–2022), Argentine footballer
- Efraín Flores (born 1958), Mexican football manager
- Elsa Flores (born 1955), American artist
- Emigdio Flores Calpiñeiro (born 1950), Bolivian politician and sociologist
- Emilio Flores Domínguez (born 1957), Mexican politician
- Enrique Flores Flores (born 1982), Mexican politician
- Erika Flores (born 1979), American former child actress and former actress, sister of Melissa Flores
- Esteban Flores (born 1970), American homicide detective accused of perjury

=== F ===
- Federico Flores (born 1992), Argentine footballer
- Felipe Flores (footballer, born 1987), Chilean footballer
- Felipe Amadeo Flores Espinosa (born 1947), Mexican politician
- Felix Flores (born 1976), Puerto Rican boxer
- Fernando Flores (born 1943), Chilean philosopher
- Francisco Flores (disambiguation)
- Franco Flores (footballer, born 1987), Argentine footballer
- Franco Flores (footballer, born 1993), Argentine footballer
- Freddy Flores, Argentine actor

=== G ===
- Gabriela Flores, Argentine actress
- Gaspar Flores de Abrego (1781–1836), Tejano land commissioner who fought alongside the colonists in Austin, mayor of San Antonio, Texas
- Gerphil Flores (born 1990), Filipino singer
- Gil Flores (born 1952), Puerto Rican baseball player
- Gilberto Flores (footballer, born 1983), Brazilian footballer

=== I ===
- Ignacio Flores (disambiguation)
- Iker Flores (born 1976), Spanish cyclist
- Irvin Flores (1925–1994), Puerto Rican activist and nationalist politician
- Isabel Flores de Oliva (1586–1617), Spanish-Peruvian saint

=== J ===
- Jace Flores, Filipino TV actor
- Jacob Flores, American judoka
- Jérémy Florès (born 1988), French surfer
- Jesse Flores (baseball), Mexican baseball player
- Jesse Flores (tennis) (born 1995), Costa Rican tennis player
- Jesús Flores (disambiguation)
- Jordan Flores, English footballer
- Jorge Flores (disambiguation)
- José Flores (disambiguation)
- Joseph Flores (Guamanian politician) (1900–1981), Governor of Guam
- Joseph Flores (Maltese politician) (1907–1974), also a judge
- Joseph Flores (born 1999), American singer and songwriter known as TEMPOREX
- Josué Flores (born 1988), Salvadoran footballer
- Juan José Flores, first President of Ecuador

=== L ===
- Laura Flores, Mexican actress
- Laura E. Flores, Panamanian ambassador to the United Nations
- Leopoldo Flores (1934–2016), Mexican artist
- Leopoldo Ruiz y Flóres (1865–1941), Mexican archbishop, Vatican diplomat
- Lola Flores, Spanish singer
- Luis Flores (basketball), Dominican basketball player

=== M ===
- Manuel N. Flores, fought in Texas Revolution and Republic Era, early Texas rancher
- Maria Flores, Ibizan abolitionist
- Marco Antonio Flores (1937–2013), Guatemalan writer and poet
- Marcos Flores (born 1985), Argentine footballer
- Mayra Flores (born 1986), American politician

=== N ===
- Nexar Antonio Flores (born 1978), Ecuadorian-Finnish fashion stylist and make-up artist

=== P ===
- Patrick Flores (1929–2017), Archbishop of San Antonio from 1979 to 2004, 1st Mexican American to become a Roman Catholic bishop
- Pedro Flores (disambiguation)
- Pete Flores (born 1960), Texas state senator

=== R ===
- Randy Flores (born 1975), American baseball executive and former Major League Baseball pitcher
- Ricardo Flores Magón (1874–1922), Mexican anarchist
- Rico Flores Jr. (born 2004), American football player
- Rodrigo Flores (1913–2007), Chilean chess player

=== S ===
- Salvador Flores, recruited and commanded troops in the Texas Revolution and Republic Era, Juan Seguin's brother-in-law

=== T ===
- Tom Flores (born 1937), American football player and coach
- Tomás Flores (1965–2025), Chilean economist and politician

=== V ===
- Venancio Flores, President of Uruguay from 1854 to 1855 (interim) and from 1865 to 1868
- Victor Flores (disambiguation)
- Von Flores (born 1960), Filipino-Canadian actor

=== W ===
- Walter Flores (disambiguation)
- Wilmer Flores (born 1991), Venezuelan baseball player

=== Y ===
- Yony Flores (born 1983), Guatemalan footballer
- Yves Flores (born 1994), Filipino actor and model

=== Z ===
- Zack Flores (born 1982), American-born Bolivian footballer

== Fictional characters ==
- Blanca Flores, in Orange is the New Black
- Cristal Flores, a character in Dynasty
- Elena Castillo Flores, the protagonist of Elena of Avalor
- Gwen Flores, a main character in Bunk'd
- Jesse Flores (The Sarah Connor Chronicles)
- Karen Flores, in Get Shorty
- Nina Sabrina Flores, the protagonist of Nina's World
- Seth Flores, in Tron: Ares
- Zita Flores, in Kim Possible

== See also ==
- Eduardo Rózsa-Flores (1960–2009), Bolivian actor, and poet
- Rachael Hip-Flores, American actress
