= Choque =

Choque is a surname of Aymara and Quechua origin common in Bolivia and Peru.

== People with the surname ==
- Deisy Choque (born 1997), Bolivian footballer
- Franz Choque (born 1969), Bolivian politician
- Mario Choque (born 1954), Bolivian politician
- Otilia Choque (born 1964), Bolivian politician
- Richard Choque (born 1988), Bolivian serial killer
- Sergio Choque (born 1968), Bolivian politician
