= Daniel Flores =

Daniel Flores may refer to:

- Danny Flores (1929–2006), singer and writer of the song "Tequila"
- Dan Flores (born 1948), historian of the American West and professor at the University of Montana
- Daniel E. Flores (born 1961), Roman Catholic bishop
- Dan Flores (American football) (born 1977), American football player
- Daniel Flores (sailor) (born 1981), Olympic sailor
- Daniel Flores (footballer, born 2000), Dominican football midfielder for Royal Pari
- Danny Flores (soccer) (born 2002), American soccer midfielder for Sporting Kansas City
- Daniel Flores (soccer, born 2003), American soccer left-back for Guadalajara
