= Point Loma High School =

Public high school in San Diego, California, United States

Coordinates: 32°44′23.83″N 117°13′31.25″W

Location
- 2335 Chatsworth Boulevard; Point Loma, San Diego; California 92106; United States

Information
- School type: Public high school
- Opened: 1925
- School district: San Diego Unified School District
- Principal: Michael Santos
- Teaching staff: 67.82 (FTE)
- Grades: 9-12
- Enrollment: 1,682 (2023-2024)
- Student to teacher ratio: 24.80
- Colors: Maroon and gold
- Mascot: Pointer Dog
- Nickname: Pointers
- Rival: Madison High School
- Newspaper: Pointer Press
- Yearbook: El Portal

Point Loma High School is a public high school in San Diego, California, United States. It is part of San Diego Unified School District. The school is located in the Loma Portal neighborhood of Point Loma. The school serves the neighborhoods of Point Loma and Ocean Beach. Students who live in Mission Hills may choose to attend Point Loma High School as their neighborhood school. Point Loma is accredited by the Western Association of Schools and Colleges (WASC).

== History ==
PLHS is the third oldest high school in the San Diego Unified School District. It was dedicated in 1925 as Point Loma Junior-Senior High school, serving grades 7 through 12. There were 386 students at its opening on September 8, 1925 (verified by photo of newspaper article covering the opening.) The first principal was Pete Ross and there were 30 teachers. Some San Diegans opposed creating a school in Point Loma, contending it was too far away from town, but school board member Edgar F. Hastings pushed the proposal through. In its early days the school was sometimes referred to as "Hastings' folly".

During the 1950s, it was converted to a three-year high school with the opening of Richard Henry Dana Junior High School. The original three-story high school building was torn down in the 1970s as part of a statewide requirement to make all schools earthquake safe. It was replaced by multiple two-story buildings. In 1983, it became a four-year high school. PLHS now draws from six elementary schools serving grades kindergarten through 4, and two middle schools: Dana Middle for grades 5 and 6, and Correia Middle for grades 7 and 8.

The school holds the distinction of having produced two major-league baseball pitchers who threw perfect games - David Wells and Don Larsen. Only 24 pitchers have thrown perfect games in Major League Baseball history. Wells also threw a perfect game while a student at PLHS. Wells became the school's head baseball coach starting with the 2014–2015 school year. He had been volunteering as an assistant coach for several years. The team's home field was named David Wells Field in 2010.

== Athletics ==
The school's colors are maroon and gold, although football uniform colors are typically unconforming with their traditional colors of a main maroon with an accent of gold. The mascot is the Pointer Dog. The school offers a variety of men's and women's competitive sports:

=== Offered ===
==== Fall ====
- Cross country (men and women)
- Field hockey (women)
- Flag Football (women)
- Football (men)
- Golf (women)
- Marching band (all genders)
- Tennis (women)
- Volleyball (women)
- Water polo (men)

==== Winter ====
- Basketball (men and women)
- Soccer (men and women)
- Water polo (women)
- Wrestling (men and women)

==== Spring ====
- Badminton (men and women)
- Baseball (men)
- Competitive cheer (men and women)
- Golf (men)
- Lacrosse (men and women)
- Softball (women)
- Swim (men and women)
- Tennis (men)
- Track & field (men and women)
- Volleyball (men)

=== Club Sports ===
- Surfing (men and women)
- Sailing (men and women)

=== Awards and championships ===
==== Football ====
The Pointer football team won CIF championships four times, in 1966, 1982, 1987 and 1991, all during the tenure of football head coach Bennie Edens.

==== Women's basketball ====
The Lady Pointers basketball team was a powerhouse at the state level during the late 1980s, capturing the state championship for four straight years, 1984 to 1987. Their victories inspired a graffiti-style mural at the athletic field. Under legendary women's basketball coach Lee Trepanier, known as "Coach T", the Lady Pointers posted an astonishing record of 335 wins and 51 losses between 1977 and 1990.

==== Sailing ====
The nationally ranked PLHS sailing team has won the Baker Trophy, the national team-racing championship of the Interscholastic Sailing Association, sixteen times (2003, 2004, 2005, 2010, 2012, 2013, 2014, and 2018), making them the national champions in the sport of sailing. PLHS sailing teams also won the Mallory Trophy, the national fleet-racing championship, eight times (1993, 2003, 2004, 2005, 2012, 2014, 2017, and 2018), a record unmatched by any other school. In 2003 PLHS Sailor Parker Shinn won the Cressy Trophy, the national singlehanded championship of the ISSA.

==== Softball ====
During the school's centennial year in 2025, the girls' softball team won the program's first ever CIF San Diego Section Division II championship, defeating West Hills High School 3–2 in the championship game. The Pointers then captured their first CIF Southern California Regional Division III championship with a 4–1 victory over Legacy High School. The team was coached by Billy Hunyady, and the varsity and junior varsity coaching staffs were composed entirely of Point Loma High School alumni, including Hunyady, varsity assistants Steve Vargas and Scott Berndes, Savannah Ames,and junior varsity head coach Chris Ghio.

== Leap of Faith ==
The school became known among skateboarders for an infamous drop called the "Leap of Faith". This was a drop of 17 feet, consisting of 27 stairs, that had to be approached by an ollie over a railing. Professional skateboarder Jamie Thomas made this spot famous in his filmed attempt to land it; he landed without injury, but his board snapped upon impact. His attempt was included in the Zero video "Thrill Of It All". Another skateboarder, Richard King and several rollerbladers also attempted it, among them Ian Brown, Brian Shima, and Chris Haffey, but no one was successful at landing it completely, and several people broke their legs or ankles in the attempt. The PLHS Leap of Faith was included as part of Tony Hawk's Pro Skater 2 and in a bonus level in Tony Hawk's Underground, the skateboarding-based video games. In 2005, the school built an elevator at the site to close it off to skateboarders.

== The Gotta Sing, Gotta Dance Company ==
English teacher Larry Zeiger taught a class in musical theater called “Contemporary voices in literature” from 1977 until his retirement in 2007. In the second semester the students became “The Gotta Sing Gotta Dance Company”, writing and performing an original musical show in which all 100+ students took part. The students were all seniors, and “Zeiger’s show” became a senior-year school tradition during the 31 years of its existence. The 2003 production "Sticky Fingers: A Tale of Saks, Lies and Videotape", which was inspired by the Winona Ryder shoplifting incident, received national attention. The Performing Arts Center on campus was renamed the "Larry Zeiger Performing Arts Center" in 2007.

== Notable alumni ==
- Mike Adamson, baseball player
- Jamal Agnew, NFL wide receiver for The Jacksonville Jaguars
- Eric Allen, six-time NFL Pro Bowler; Philadelphia Eagles, New Orleans Saints, Oakland Raiders; ESPN analyst
- Margaret Avery, actress, nominated for an Academy Award, The Color Purple
- John Balaz, Major League Baseball player
- Rigo Beltrán, Mexican baseball player
- Todd Benjamin, CNN business reporter
- Graham Biehl, 2008 and 2012 Olympian in men's 470 sailboat
- Malin Burnham, American sailor, philanthropist, and businessman
- Tate Carew, skateboarder
- Florence Chadwick, swimmer, first woman to swim English Channel in both directions
- Bill Cleator, former San Diego City Councilmember, District 2
- Dennis Conner, sailor, four-time winner of America's Cup
- Faye Margaret Emerson,, stage and film actress, first American television late night and evening chat show host, The Faye Emerson Show, Fifteen with Faye, Faye Emerson's Wonderful Town, Author Meets the Critics, Faye and Skitch.
- Randy Gardner (record holder), holder of world record for longest time a human has gone without sleep
- Cecil Espy, baseball player
- Jim Fuller, baseball player
- La'Roi Glover, NFL defensive tackle, St Louis Rams, Oakland Raiders, New Orleans Saints
- Sandra Good, Manson Family member
- Justin Halpern, writer
- Gary Heffern, punk rock musician and poet
- Waad Hirmez, six-time pro soccer champion with San Diego Sockers; 1981 CIF player of the year
- Ben Hueso, state legislator
- James D. Hudnall, writer
- Joe Hutshing, Academy Award-winning film editor
- Don Larsen, Major League Baseball pitcher, pitched only perfect game in World Series (1956)
- Bill Lowery, former Congressman
- Dorian "Doc" Paskowitz (1921–2014), surfer and physician
- Briana Provancha, Olympic sailor in 2016
- Mark Reynolds, four-time Olympian in sailing with two gold medals and one silver; two-time Star World champion
- Marion Ross, actress, Happy Days
- Jason Scheff, member of rock band Chicago
- Greg Slough, football player
- JL Skinner, NFL safety for the Denver Broncos
- Keegan Smith, tennis player
- Marty Smith. professional motocross racer
- Suzy Spafford, creator of Suzy's Zoo line of greeting cards, calendars and cartoons
- JJ Stokes, NFL wide receiver, San Francisco 49ers, New England Patriots, Jacksonville Jaguars
- Jeff Staggs, football player
- Slightly Stoopid, reggae rock band
- David R. Thompson, judge
- Kien Vu, baseball player
- Wavves musician Nathan Williams
- David Wells, Major League Baseball pitcher, pitched perfect game in 1998
- Dan White, football player, quarterback for 1994 Fiesta Bowl champion Arizona
- Jimmy Wilson, defensive back, Miami Dolphins
- Mike Wofford (1938–2025), jazz pianist and conductor
- Aaron Zigman, songwriter and Hollywood film score composer
- TEMPOREX, singer, songwriter and musician

== See also ==
- Primary and secondary schools in San Diego, California
- List of high schools in San Diego County, California
