= Dan White (quarterback) =

American football player (born 1972)

No. 16
- Position: Quarterback

Personal information
- Born: September 14, 1972 (age 54)
- Listed height: 6 ft 5 in (1.96 m)
- Listed weight: 220 lb (100 kg)

Career information
- High school: Point Loma (San Diego, California)
- College: Arizona
- NFL draft: 1996: undrafted

Career history
- Houston Oilers (1996)*; Atlanta Falcons (1996)*; Tampa Bay Storm (1997)
- * Offseason or practice squad member only

Career AFL statistics
- TD–INT: 3–3
- Passing yards: 240
- Completion %: 48.9
- Passer rating: 53.94
- Stats at ArenaFan.com

Dan White (born September 14, 1972) is an American former football quarterback. He was the starting quarterback for the University of Arizona football team from 1993–1995, a span which included the Wildcats' only Pac-10 championship to date, as well as a record-setting Fiesta Bowl victory.

== Early life ==
White began his football career at Point Loma High School in San Diego, CA, where he was the starting quarterback for a powerhouse team that included gifted wide-receiver Brett Callan, as well as future NFL stars J. J. Stokes and La'Roi Glover. The team was coached throughout White's four years by local legend Bennie Edens.

== College career ==
After high school, White attended Penn State, hoping to play for hall-of-fame coach Joe Paterno, but he never saw significant playing time. After one season, he transferred to the University of Arizona, where he spent a redshirt year before winning the starting quarterback role in 1993.

That season, with White at the helm, the Wildcats rolled to a 10–2 record and broke a 15-year drought to tie for their first (and, to date, only) share of the Pac-10 championship. The Wildcats wrapped up the season in the Fiesta Bowl, where White threw for two touchdowns en route to a 29–0 defeat of 10th-ranked Miami, the first shutout in Fiesta Bowl history.

White would continue as starting quarterback until 1995, finishing with 40 touchdown passes for his career and, perhaps more importantly, an unbeaten 3–0 record against the Wildcats' arch-rival ASU Sun Devils, throwing 7 touchdowns and only one interception in those three games. A 2008 editorial in the Arizona Daily Star ranked him as one of the Wildcats' 10 best quarterbacks of all time.

== Professional career ==
After college, White was not taken in the NFL draft, but signed with the Houston Oilers as a free agent immediately following the draft. He was subsequently traded to the Atlanta Falcons before finishing his pro career in the Arena Football League, where he played for the Tampa Bay Storm during the 1997 season.

== Quotes ==
White's inconsistent play inspired this memorable quote by ABC announcer Mark Jones: "Against USC, he looked like Dan Marino. Against Washington State, he looked like Dan Quayle."
