= Enrique Flores =

Enrique Flores may refer to

- Enrique Flores (boxer) (born 1968), Puerto Rican light heavyweight
- Enrique Flores Flores (born 1982), Mexican politician from San Luis Potosí
- Enrique Flores (footballer) (born 1994), Bolivian left-back
- Enrique Flores Lanza, Honduran lawyer and politician
- Enrique Flores Magón (1877–1954), Mexican journalist and revolutionary

== See also ==
- Enrique Flórez (1702–1773), Spanish historian
