= Cornelia Flores =

Bolivian politician (born 1962)

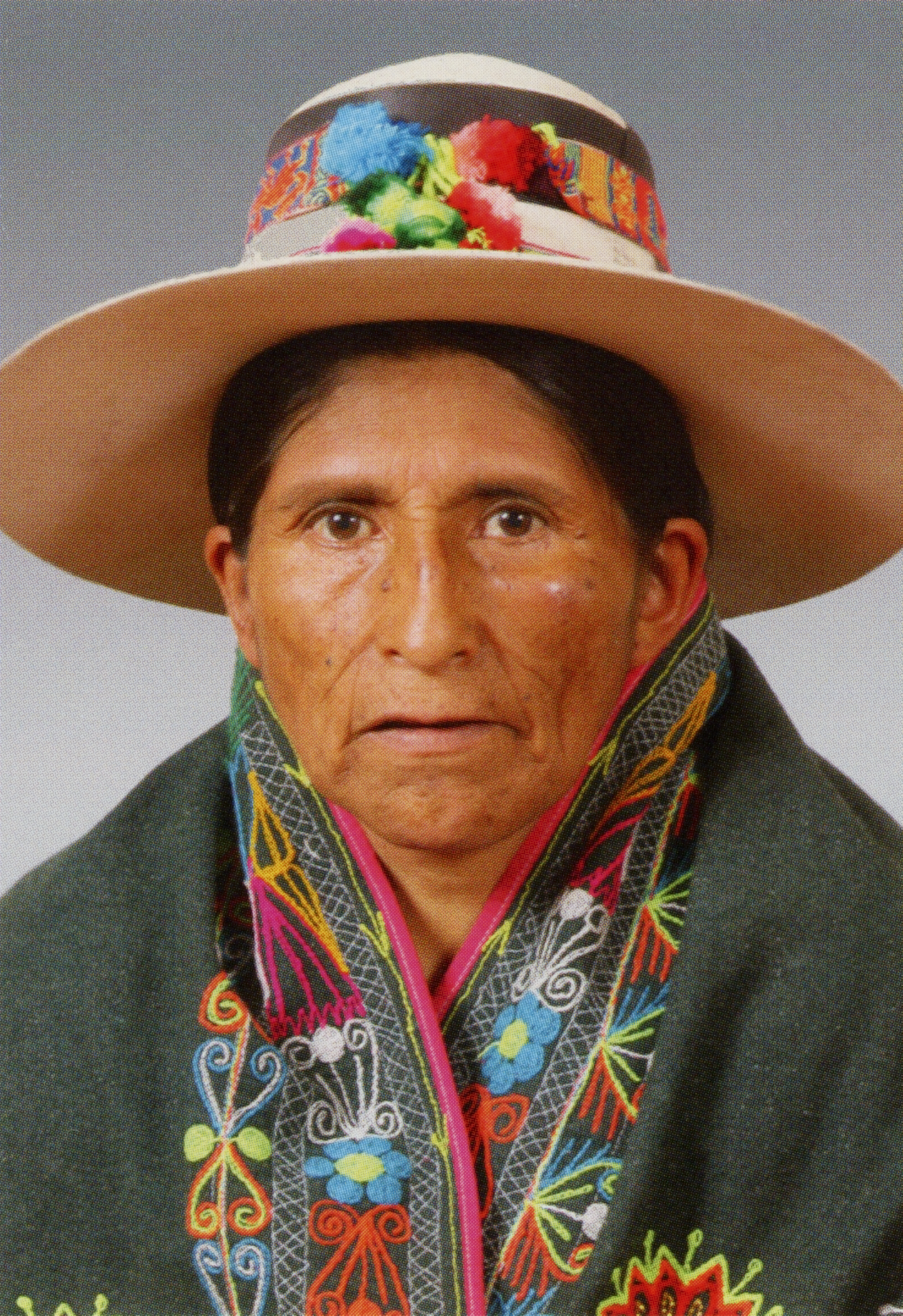
- Official portrait, 2014

Member of the Chamber of Deputies from Oruro's 34th constituency
- Substitute
- In office 25 January 2010 – 18 January 2015
- Deputy: Ever Moya
- Preceded by: Gloria Ticlla
- Succeeded by: Constituency abolished
- Constituency: Cercado

Member of the Constituent Assembly from Oruro's 34th constituency
- In office 3 August 2006 – 14 December 2007
- Constituency: Cercado

Personal details
- Born: Cornelia Flores Choque; 16 September 1962 (age 64) Micayani, Oruro, Bolivia
- Party: Movement Toward Socialism
- Occupation: Politician; trade unionist

Cornelia Flores Choque (Note: In this Spanish name, the first or paternal surname is Flores and the second or maternal family name is Choque.) (born 16 September 1962) is a Bolivian politician and trade unionist who represented Oruro's 34th constituency in the Constituent Assembly from 2006 to 2007 and as a substitute in the Chamber of Deputies from 2010 to 2015.

Flores, an indigenous Quechua, was raised in Micayani in rural Cercado Province. She worked in agriculture and became involved in trade unionism and women's social movement organizations, leading her local branch of the Bartolina Sisa Federation. Through the organization's alliance with the Movement Toward Socialism, she was elected to the Constituent Assembly in 2006 and became a member of parliament in 2009.

== Early life and trade unionism ==
Cornelia Flores was born on 16 September 1962 in Micayani, a small town in the Cercado Province of Oruro Department. She is the daughter of Miguel Flores Colque and Ascencia Choque Mamani, and is of indigenous Quechua origin. Flores attended school only through the fifth grade, receiving instruction in Aymara and Quechua; she has indicated that Spanish was not her first language.

Raised in rural poverty, Flores worked in agriculture and tended livestock. She emerged as a trade union leader in Micayani and was also active in women's social movement organizations. Prior to 2007, she spent eight years leading provincial women's organizations, including as local general secretary of the Bartolina Sisa Federation, the national peasant women's union, in Paria Municipality.

== Constituent Assembly ==
=== Election ===
In politics, the Bartolinas affiliated with the Movement Toward Socialism (MAS) and received from it a share of representation in government and the legislature. In the run-up to the Constituent Assembly, the federation lobbied for and secured a gender quota in candidate lists. "Gender equity must be evident in the Constituent Assembly", Flores stated. As a result, the Bartolinas attained a small bench of roughly eighteen seats within the MAS majority. Flores was elected to represent Oruro's 34th constituency.

=== Tenure ===
Flores took office on 3 August 2006, and her term was extended from 6 August to 14 December 2007 due to delays in drafting the new constitution. She became a member of the Education and Interculturality Commission on 19 January 2007, after a lengthy period of deadlock. In office, she promoted the recognition of indigenous cultures and languages and advocated the adoption of intercultural bilingual education. "We must defend both languages; it cannot be just Aymara and Quechua alone. Native languages must come first [in their regions], followed by Spanish", she stated.

=== Commission assignments ===
- Education and Interculturality Commission
  - Culture and Sports Subcommission (2007)

== Chamber of Deputies ==
=== Election ===
Female representation increased on the MAS candidate slate in 2009, but did not meet gender parity, as mandated by law. Particularly in single-member districts, male candidates took up most principal seats. In the 34th constituency, the party nominated Ever Moya, with Flores as his substitute. Their ticket was elected to the Chamber of Deputies, as the MAS swept the vote across the department.

=== Tenure ===
Flores was sworn in alongside other substitutes on 25 January 2010. During her term, she served as vice president of Oruro's legislative delegation, and sat on its Land, Territory, and Environment Commission. In legislation, she performed oversight on regional public works, and presented projects for rural electrification, potable water, and the conservation of Paria's colonial church, a historic sixteenth-century building on the verge of collapse.

=== Commission assignments ===
- Plural Justice, Prosecutor's Office, and Legal Defense of the State Commission
  - Ordinary Jurisdiction and Magistracy Council Committee (2010–2011)
  - Indigenous Native Peasant Jurisdiction Committee (2014–2015)
- Human Rights Commission (President: 2013–2014)
  - Human Rights and Equal Opportunities Committee (Secretary: 2011–2012)
- Constitution, Legislation, and Electoral System Commission
  - Constitutional Review and Legislative Harmonization Committee (2012–2013)

== Electoral history ==
Electoral history of Cornelia Flroes
Year	Office		Party	Votes			Result	Ref.
Year	Office		Party	Total	%	P.	Result	Ref.
2006	Constituent	C-34	Movement Toward Socialism	23,906	66.12	1st	Won	
2009	Deputies	C-34	Movement Toward Socialism	33,774	75.33	1st	Won	
Source: Plurinational Electoral Organ | Electoral Atlas

Bolivian Constituent Assembly
Seat established	Member of the Constituent Assembly from Oruro's 34th constituency 2006–2007; Served alongside: Filiberto Escalante, Juan Zubieta	Seat dissolved
Chamber of Deputies of Bolivia
Preceded by Gloria Ticlla	Substitute Member of the Chamber of Deputies from Oruro's 34th constituency 2010–2015	Constituency abolished
