= Carlos Flores =

Carlos Flores may refer to:

== Politicians ==
- Carlos Flores Dueñas (born 1948), Mexican politician
- Carlos Roberto Flores (born 1950), President of Honduras 1998–2002
- Carlos Alberto Flores Gutiérrez (born 1974), Mexican politician
- Carlos Flores Rico (born 1952), Mexican politician
- Carlos Flores (Spanish politician) (born 1964)
- Carlos Flores Guifarro (born 1970), Honduran Politician and Vice President-elect of Honduras

== Sportspeople ==
=== Association football ===
- Carlos Flores (footballer, 1974–2019), Peru international midfielder
- Carlos Flores (footballer, born 1978), Peruvian football centre-back
- Carlos Flores (footballer, born 1988), Peruvian football midfielder

=== Other sports ===
- Carlos Julio Flores (born 1980), Venezuelan windsurfer

== See also ==
- Fernando Flores (born 1943), Chilean politician, full name Carlos Fernando Flores Labra
- Carlos Rivera Flores (born 1989), Mexican footballer
