= Bennie Edens =

American football coach (1925–2008)

Biographical details
- Born: December 7, 1925; San Diego, California, U.S.
- Died: February 8, 2008 (aged 82); San Diego, California, U.S.

Coaching career (HC unless noted)
- 1950–1998: Point Loma HS (San Diego, CA)

Head coaching record
- Overall: 241–168–16

Accomplishments and honors

Awards
- NFL High School Coach of the Year; California High School Coach of the Year; California Athletic Director of the Year; Southern Section Coach of the Year; All-San Diego County Football Coach of the Year

Bennie Edens (December 7, 1925 – February 8, 2008) was an American football coach. He was the head football coach at Point Loma High School from 1950 to 1998. He received many individual coaching awards (including NFL High School Coach of the Year), coached the team to 5 CIF championships, and finished his career with the most wins at a single school of any coach in section history. The football stadium at Point Loma High School is named in his honor.

== Personal life ==
Edens lived his entire life in San Diego, California. He attended Hoover High School, where he played football and boxed. Graduating from Hoover in 1944, he then attended San Diego State University, where he played football. He graduated from SDSU in 1948 and began a career at Point Loma High School as a student teacher, while also working at the Kona Kai Club as the activities director and swim instructor.

Edens' family included his wife Maxine and their two children, Jim and Kathie. Edens and his wife experienced the death of Kathie at the age of 23; the car accident responsible for her death also claimed the life of her husband.

== Coaching career ==
Edens became head coach of the Pointers in 1955 and continued in that role through several generations of students until his retirement in 1998. He finished his career with a record of 241–168–16, a sectional record for the most wins by a coach at a single school and second on the sectional all-time list. His teams won CIF championships five times during his tenure in 1962, 1966, 1982, 1987 and 1991.

After 10 years of retirement, Edens died of a heart attack in early February 2008. Obituaries called him "a legend", and his memorial service, held at the Point Loma High athletic field, filled the stadium that bears his name to capacity. Following his death, Point Loma High School established the Bennie Edens Scholarship Fund in his honor.

== Athletes coached ==
Edens coached many athletes who went on to professional sporting careers, including:

- Jeff Staggs (linebacker for the St. Louis Cardinals and San Diego Chargers in the 1960s)
- Greg Slough (All-American linebacker at USC; played for New England Patriots and Oakland Raiders in the 1970s)
- Eric Allen (cornerback for the Philadelphia Eagles and Oakland Raiders in the 1980s and 1990s)
- J. J. Stokes (wide receiver for the San Francisco 49ers in the 1990s)
- La'Roi Glover (defensive tackle for the St. Louis Rams, 49'ers, Dallas Cowboys and New Orleans Saints)
- David Wells (pitcher for the New York Yankees during the 1990s and 2000s)

== Awards and honors ==
- 1966 San Diego County High School Football Coach of the Year
- 1981 California Athletic Director of the Year
- 1983 All-San Diego County Football Coach of the Year and Southern Section Coach of the Year.
- Jan. 11, 1988 was proclaimed Bennie Edens Day by the city of San Diego
- 1992 California High School Coach of the Year
- 2002 NFL High School Coach of the Year
