= La'Roi Glover =

American football player and coach (born 1974)

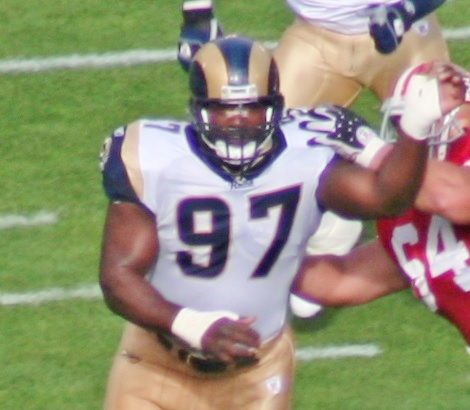
- Glover with the St. Louis Rams in 2007

Orlando Storm
- Title: Defensive line coach

Personal information
- Born: July 4, 1974 (age 52); San Diego, California, U.S.
- Listed height: 6 ft 2 in (1.88 m)
- Listed weight: 290 lb (132 kg)

Career information
- Position: Defensive tackle (No. 92, 97)
- High school: Point Loma (San Diego)
- College: San Diego State
- NFL draft: 1996: 5th round, 166th overall pick

Career history

Playing
- Oakland Raiders (1996); Barcelona Dragons (1997); New Orleans Saints (1997–2001); Dallas Cowboys (2002–2005); St. Louis Rams (2006–2008)

Coaching
- New York Jets (2017–2018) Assistant defensive line coach; Los Angeles Chargers (2019–2020) Assistant defensive line coach; St. Louis BattleHawks (2023–2025) Defensive line coach; Orlando Storm (2026–present) Defensive line coach

Operations
- St. Louis / Los Angeles Rams (2010–2016) Director of player engagement

Awards and highlights
- First-team All-Pro (2000); 3× Second-team All-Pro (1998, 2002, 2003); 6× Pro Bowl (2000–2005); NFL sacks leader (2000); NFL 2000s All-Decade Team; New Orleans Saints Hall of Fame; World Bowl champion (1997); 2× second-team All-WAC (1993, 1995)

Career NFL statistics
- Tackles: 557
- Sacks: 83.5
- Forced fumbles: 16
- Fumble recoveries: 8
- Interceptions: 2
- Stats at Pro Football Reference

La'Roi Damon Glover (/ləˈrɔɪ/; born July 4, 1974) is an American professional football coach and former player who is the defensive line coach for the Orlando Storm of the United Football League (UFL). He played as a defensive tackle in the National Football League (NFL). Glover played college football for the San Diego State Aztecs. He enjoyed a 13-year career in which he made six-consecutive Pro Bowls and was a four-time All-Pro selection. He spent five seasons with the New Orleans Saints (1997–2001), four seasons with the Dallas Cowboys (2002–2005) and finished his playing career with the St. Louis Rams (2006–2008).

== Early life ==
Born in San Diego, California, Glover graduated from Point Loma High School of San Diego in 1992. At Point Loma, Glover lettered in football, wrestling, and track, and he earned awards in all three sports. Under coach Bennie Edens, he was part of the 1990 Pointers team that included Dan White and J. J. Stokes. During the 1990 season, Glover totaled 77 tackles, 17.5 sacks, six fumble recoveries and six forced fumbles, earning the honor of San Diego Co-Player of the Year. In 1991 as a senior defensive lineman, he was named San Diego section co-Player of the Year, USA Today second-team All-America and CIF Player of the Year, Cal-Hi Sports first-team, the Los Angeles Times Lineman of the Year.

He is the third player from Point Loma High School to have his jersey (No. 76) retired along with Marcel Brown (No. 22) and Eric Allen (No. 25).

== College career ==
Although he had various college offers, he chose to follow his older brother Darcel Glover to San Diego State University and remain close to home.

While attending SDSU, Glover was a four-year starter in football. As a senior, he had 4.5 sacks and 36 tackles, was a defensive captain, won Aztec Outstanding Defensive Lineman honors, an All-Western Athletic Conference second-team selection, and was chosen to play for the West squad in the East–West Shrine Game. As a sophomore, he was a second-team All-Western Athletic Conference selection. As a freshman, he won All-Western Athletic Conference honorable mention honors. He graduated from San Diego State in 1999 with double major in public administration and sociology.

In 2010, San Diego State athletics inducted Glover to the Aztec Hall of Fame. As of 2010, Glover ranked third all-time at San Diego State with 44.5 tackles for loss and fourth all-time in sacks (18.5).

== Professional playing career ==
Pre-draft measurables
Height	Weight	Arm length	Hand span	40-yard dash	10-yard split	20-yard split	20-yard shuttle	Vertical jump	Broad jump	Bench press
6 ft 1 1/8 in (1.86 m)	281 lb (127 kg)	33 1/8 in (0.84 m)	9 5/8 in (0.24 m)	5.31 s	1.80 s	3.04 s	4.59 s	28.5 in (0.72 m)	8 ft 7 in (2.62 m)	32 reps

=== Oakland Raiders (1996) ===
The Oakland Raiders drafted Glover with the 34th pick in the fifth round of the 1996 NFL draft. In his NFL debut on November 19, Glover made two tackles against the Minnesota Vikings. His only other game in the season was next week on November 26 against the Seattle Seahawks on defensive line and special teams.

=== Barcelona Dragons (1997) ===
In the spring of 1997, Glover played for the Barcelona Dragons of the World League of American Football. Earning all-league honors, Glover helped the Dragons win World Bowl '97 and ranked third in the league with 6.5 sacks and adding 36 tackles.

=== New Orleans Saints (1997–2001) ===
The day after the Raiders waived him, Glover signed with the New Orleans Saints on August 25, 1997. Although he started only 2 of 15 games played in 1997, Glover recorded 6.5 sacks, one forced fumble, a recovered fumble, and 24 tackles. In 1998, Glover started 15 of 16 games and had 59 tackles, 10 sacks, three forced fumbles, and an interception. Glover then made 8.5 sacks, 46 tackles, a forced fumble, and a fumble recovery in 1999.

"Glover proved everybody wrong, especially our defensive coaches in New Orleans who initially thought he was too small to play in the middle of our 4-3," said former Saints president/general manager Bill Kuharich who gives credit to pro personnel man Chet Franklin for spotting Glover. "He turned out to be the greatest waiver claim in the history of the Saints."

He was a solid starter during his three seasons with Mike Ditka, but his career blossomed when Jim Haslett was hired as the Saints coach in 2000 and decided to move him to the three-technique tackle within a great front four group.

That season, he led the NFL with 17 sacks – a rare feat and second most ever by a defensive tackle – and was named NFC Defensive Player of the Year. He also became a unanimous first-team All-Pro selection and earned a Pro Bowl berth as he helped lead the Saints to a division championship and first-ever playoff win. He was also voted the New Orleans Saints defensive MVP. Amidst his accolades, Glover boasted 53 tackles, three forced fumbles, and a fumble recovery. In the Saints' come-from-behind 28–27 victory over the San Diego Chargers in Week 2 (September 10), Glover twice sacked Chargers quarterback Ryan Leaf and forced 4th-and-22 in the Chargers' final drive.

During his tenure in New Orleans, he was also a recipient of the Saints "Man of the Year" and "Unsung Hero" awards. In 2013, the team elected Glover to the Saints Hall of Fame for the Class of 2013. Glover was the lone choice of the Saints Hall of Fame Media Selection Committee.

=== Dallas Cowboys (2002–2005) ===
Following an impressive five-year run with the Saints, the Dallas Cowboys quickly swooped in and signed Glover to a multi-year deal. At the time, the team had endured back-to-back 5–11 seasons.

During his time with the Cowboys, Glover solidified his place as one of the best defensive tackles in the NFL. He also provided a veteran locker room presence, helped anchor a young defensive line and was an integral part of the transformation from a losing team into one that returned to the playoffs. While in Dallas, he earned four consecutive Pro Bowl nominations (2002-2005) and was named All-Pro in 2002 and 2003. He played in all 64 games during his four seasons with the Cowboys, registered 21.5 sacks and forced five fumbles.

His last season with the team in 2005, the defense switched to a 3-4 alignment, where he started splitting playing time with Jason Ferguson and was eventually relegated to a backup role in early December. He was released at the end of the year, because he wasn't seen as a good fit for the new defense and salary cap considerations.

Glover had unprecedented success during his relatively brief stay, leaving as one of the most decorated players in franchise history and one of its most successful free agent signings. He is the only Cowboys player to make the Pro Bowl in every one of his playing seasons.

=== St. Louis Rams (2006–2008) ===
In 2006, Glover signed as a free agent with the St. Louis Rams, reuniting him with Jim Haslett. He was the Rams 2007 Walter Payton Man of the Year.

On June 22, 2009, Glover officially announced his retirement from the National Football League. After a decorated professional career, he was named to the NFL 2000s All-Decade team.

During his career, he played 13 seasons, went to six straight Pro Bowls, had 433 tackles and 83.5 sacks, eight forced fumbles and two interceptions.

== NFL career statistics ==
Legend
	Led the league
**Bold**	Career high

=== Regular season ===
Year	Team	Games		Tackles				Interceptions				Fumbles			
Year	Team	GP	GS	Comb	Solo	Ast	Sck	Int	Yds	TD	Lng	FF	FR	Yds	TD
1996	OAK	2	0	2	2	0	0.0	0	0	0	0	0	0	0	0
1997	NOR	15	2	33	24	9	6.5	0	0	0	0	1	1	0	0
1998	NOR	16	15	**67**	**59**	8	10.0	**1**	0	0	0	**3**	0	0	0
1999	NOR	16	16	62	46	**16**	8.5	0	0	0	0	1	1	2	0
2000	NOR	16	16	66	53	13	**17.0**	0	0	0	0	**3**	1	0	0
2001	NOR	16	16	47	36	11	8.0	0	0	0	0	**3**	**2**	**12**	0
2002	DAL	16	16	50	39	11	6.5	**1**	**7**	0	**7**	2	0	0	0
2003	DAL	16	16	49	33	**16**	5.0	0	0	0	0	1	**2**	0	0
2004	DAL	16	16	41	31	10	7.0	0	0	0	0	1	0	0	0
2005	DAL	16	13	28	23	5	3.0	0	0	0	0	1	0	0	0
2006	STL	16	16	43	38	5	5.5	0	0	0	0	0	1	0	0
2007	STL	16	16	39	33	6	6.0	0	0	0	0	0	0	0	0
2008	STL	16	9	30	20	10	0.5	0	0	0	0	0	0	0	0
		193	167	557	437	120	83.5	2	7	0	7	16	8	14	0

=== Playoffs ===
Year	Team	Games		Tackles				Interceptions				Fumbles			
Year	Team	GP	GS	Comb	Solo	Ast	Sck	Int	Yds	TD	Lng	FF	FR	Yds	TD
2000	NOR	2	2	**6**	**6**	0	0.0	0	0	0	0	0	**1**	0	0
2003	DAL	1	1	5	3	**2**	0.0	0	0	0	0	0	0	0	0
		3	3	11	9	2	0.0	0	0	0	0	0	1	0	0

== Coaching career ==
Glover was hired by the Los Angeles Chargers as their assistant defensive line coach on April 9, 2019. He missed the team's week 13 game against the New England Patriots in 2020.

Glover was officially hired by the St. Louis BattleHawks on September 13, 2022. On July 24, 2023, he was named as a guest assistant coach for the Saints for training camp and the preseason via the Bill Walsh Diversity Coaching fellowship.

== Personal life ==
He is married to Spring, and they have three children: La'Roi Jr., Noemie and Sophia. Glover earned a Master of Business Administration degree from Fontbonne University in St. Louis, MO in 2012.

In 2010, the St. Louis Rams hired Glover as the Director of Player Engagement, where he helps players make the transition to pro football and assist them with various off-field matters.

Glover is a guest member on the Football Night sportscaster team of San Diego television station KNSD (NBC 7/39).
