= Todd Benjamin =

American journalist

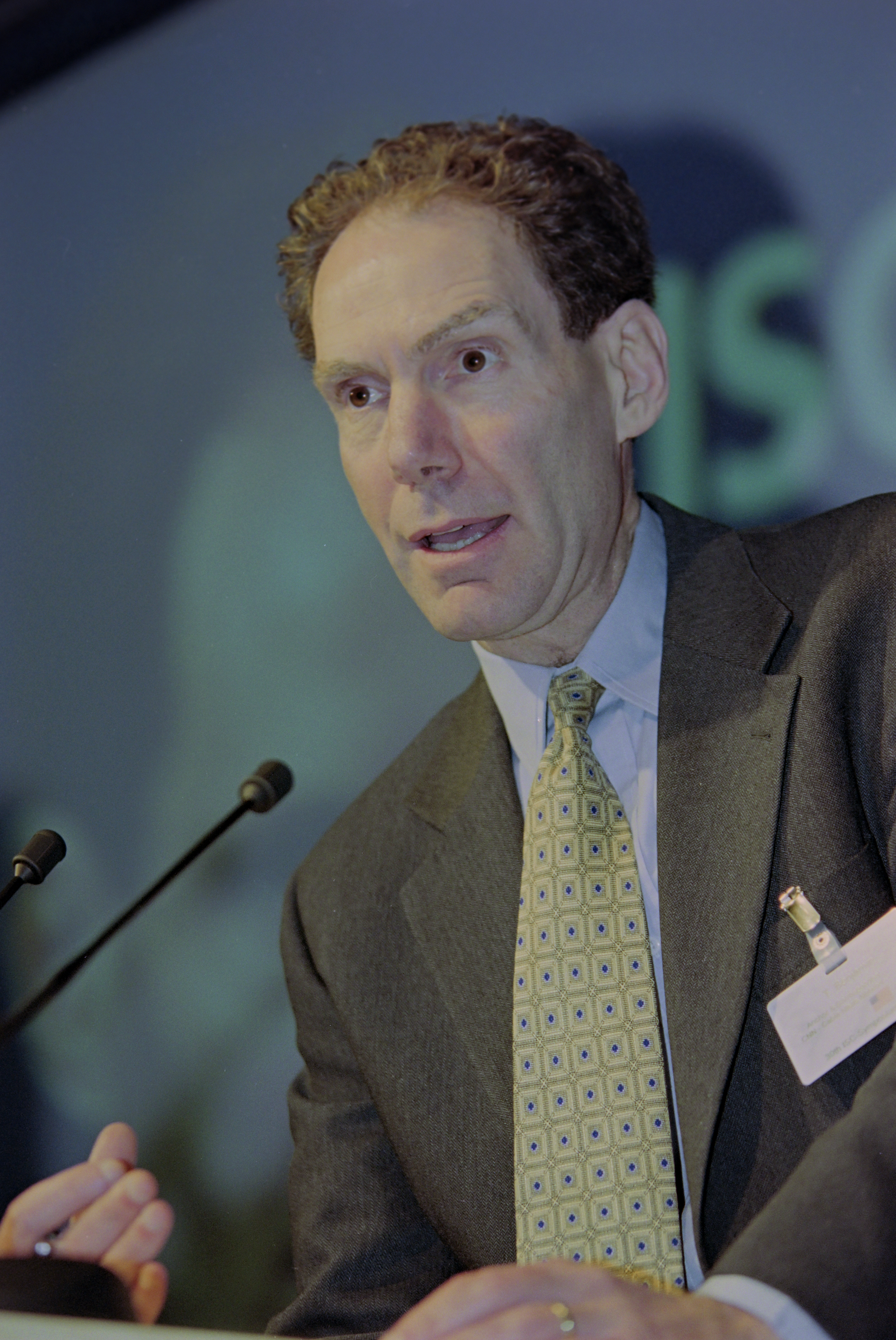
- Benjamin at the ISC Symposium
- Born: Todd Benjamin; United States
- Education: Point Loma High School
- Spouse: 1
- Children: 1
- Presenting career
- Show: Various CNN programs
- Network: CNN
- Style: News presentation, financial journalism
- Country: United States

Todd Benjamin is a former CNN presenter, anchor, correspondent and interviewer. He spent 26 years at CNN as an anchor, correspondent and financial editor. Since 1993, he conducted interviews with many people including former Soviet President Mikhail Gorbachev, former US president Bill Clinton, and former chairman of the Federal Reserve Alan Greenspan. He now moderates conferences all over the world.

He has been based in New York, Washington and Tokyo and now lives in London with his wife and child. For many years, he was a visiting lecturer in leadership at the London Business School Executive Education program.

Benjamin is now deputy chairman and a trustee of City Harvest London, a charity that helps put fresh surplus food to good use in a sustainable way by redistributing to organizations that feed the hungry.
