= J. J. Stokes =

American football player (born 1972)

No. 83, 85, 18
- Position: Wide receiver

Personal information
- Born: October 6, 1972 (age 54); San Diego, California, U.S.
- Listed height: 6 ft 4 in (1.93 m)
- Listed weight: 225 lb (102 kg)

Career information
- High school: Point Loma (San Diego)
- College: UCLA
- NFL draft: 1995: 1st round, 10th overall pick

Career history
- San Francisco 49ers (1995–2002); Jacksonville Jaguars (2003); New England Patriots (2003)

Awards and highlights
- Super Bowl champion (XXXVIII); Unanimous All-American (1993); Pac-10 Offensive Player of the Year (1993); First-team All-Pac-10 (1993)

Career NFL statistics
- Receptions: 342
- Receiving yards: 4,293
- Receiving touchdowns: 30
- Stats at Pro Football Reference

Jerel Jamal Stokes (born October 6, 1972) is an American former professional football player who was a wide receiver for nine seasons in the National Football League (NFL). He played college football for the UCLA Bruins, earning unanimous All-American honors in 1993. A first-round selection in the 1995 NFL draft by the San Francisco 49ers, he played in the NFL for the 49ers, Jacksonville Jaguars and New England Patriots. He won a Super Bowl with the Patriots in 2003.

== Early life ==
Stokes was born in San Diego, California. He attended Point Loma High School in San Diego, where he was part of a talented high school football team that included quarterback Dan White and lineman La'Roi Glover. The team was coached throughout Stokes' four years by local legend Bennie Edens.

== College career ==
While attending University of California, Los Angeles (UCLA), Stokes played for the Bruins from 1991 to 1994. His breakout season came in his junior year when he was named the Pac-10 Offensive Player of the Year. Stokes' junior season was rewarded with a top ten finish in the balloting for that year's Heisman Trophy, being the only junior recognized. Stokes' junior season ended with unanimous All-American recognition by The Sporting News, AP, UPI, and Kodak. Stokes' senior year began as the nation's leading Heisman contender, but was quickly sidetracked by a severe upper thigh contusion suffered in the season's first game. Stokes still holds UCLA school records for receiving touchdowns in a season (17 in 1993), receiving touchdowns in a career (28), receiving yards in a game (263 vs. USC in 1992) and receptions in a game (14 vs. Wisconsin, 1994 Rose Bowl), among others.

On October 9, 2009, Stokes was inducted into the UCLA Athletics Hall of Fame.

- 1991: 5 catches for 55 yards.
- 1992: 41 catches for 728 yards with 7 TD.
- 1993: 82 catches for 1181 yards with 17 TD.
- 1994: 26 catches for 505 yards with 4 TD.

== Professional career ==
Pre-draft measurables
| Height | Weight | Arm length | Hand span | 40-yard dash |
|---|---|---|---|---|
| 6 ft 4 1/2 in (1.94 m) | 217 lb (98 kg) | 34 1/8 in (0.87 m) | 9 3/4 in (0.25 m) | 4.51 s |
All values from NFL Combine

Stokes was selected with the first round (tenth overall pick) of the 1995 NFL draft by the San Francisco 49ers. He played for the 49ers from 1995 to 2002. The 49ers traded up 20 spots to the No. 10 pick in the first round of the draft to select Stokes. After a slow start to his rookie season, the former Bruin ultimately netted 38 receptions for 517 yards and four touchdowns, the last of which was tossed by Jerry Rice.

During the 1996 season, Stokes suffered a broken hand and missed most of the season, leading to the emergence of the 49ers' third round pick in the 1996 NFL draft, wide receiver Terrell Owens.

In 1997, with Rice sidelined with a torn ACL, Stokes and Owens formed a formidable duo for quarterback Steve Young, with Stokes hauling in 58 passes for 733 yards and four touchdowns. Once Rice returned, Stokes' production did not falter as he would achieve career highs in receptions (63), yards (770) and touchdowns (eight). Stokes was also the recipient of Denver linebacker Bill Romanowski spitting in his face during a Monday Night Football game in December 1997.

Along with the rest of the team, Stokes' production dropped in 1999 as a result of Young's career-ending concussion in a Monday night game in Arizona. Football Outsiders called Stokes "the league's least valuable receiver" in 1999.

The 49ers released him in 2003 and he was initially signed by the Jacksonville Jaguars before going to New England. Stokes was rarely used by either team, only contributing 15 catches for 154 yards during the 2003 campaign. New England released him and activated fullback Larry Centers near the end of the season. However, he was re-signed by the Patriots prior to the AFC Championship Game.

== NFL career statistics ==
Legend
| **Bold** | Career high |

=== Regular season ===
| Year | Team | Games | | Receiving | | | | | |
| Year | Team | GP | GS | Tgt | Rec | Yds | Avg | Lng | TD |
|---|---|---|---|---|---|---|---|---|---|
| 1995 | SFO | 12 | 2 | 52 | 38 | 517 | 13.6 | 41 | 4 |
| 1996 | SFO | 6 | 6 | 39 | 18 | 249 | 13.8 | 40 | 0 |
| 1997 | SFO | 16 | 16 | 80 | 58 | 733 | 12.6 | 36 | 4 |
| 1998 | SFO | 16 | 11 | **93** | **63** | **770** | 12.2 | 33 | **8** |
| 1999 | SFO | 16 | 4 | 78 | 34 | 429 | 12.6 | 47 | 3 |
| 2000 | SFO | 16 | 3 | 53 | 30 | 524 | 17.5 | **53** | 3 |
| 2001 | SFO | 16 | 16 | 90 | 54 | 585 | 10.8 | 47 | 7 |
| 2002 | SFO | 13 | 8 | 55 | 32 | 332 | 10.4 | 51 | 1 |
| 2003 | JAX | 5 | 3 | 16 | 13 | 116 | 8.9 | 22 | 0 |
| 2003 | NWE | 2 | 0 | 3 | 2 | 38 | **19.0** | 31 | 0 |
| | | 118 | 69 | 559 | 342 | 4,293 | 12.6 | 53 | 30 |

=== Postseason ===
| Year | Team | Games | | Receiving | | | | | |
| Year | Team | GP | GS | Tgt | Rec | Yds | Avg | Lng | TD |
|---|---|---|---|---|---|---|---|---|---|
| 1995 | SFO | 1 | 0 | 6 | 3 | 24 | 8.0 | 18 | 0 |
| 1997 | SFO | 2 | 2 | **22** | **15** | **188** | 12.5 | **43** | 0 |
| 1998 | SFO | 2 | 0 | 17 | 10 | 134 | **13.4** | 33 | 0 |
| 2001 | SFO | 1 | 1 | 6 | 4 | 52 | 13.0 | 21 | 0 |
| 2002 | SFO | 2 | 1 | 13 | 5 | 34 | 6.8 | 10 | 0 |
| | | 8 | 4 | 64 | 37 | 432 | 11.7 | 43 | 0 |

== Life after football ==
He worked as a radio host for the ESPN radio affiliate based out of Modesto, California. Currently, he works as an analyst for Fox Sports on UCLA's football games and for high school football on the internet in Southern California. He is currently residing in the Bay Area with his wife and kids.

== See also ==
- List of NCAA major college football yearly receiving leaders
