= José Flores =

José Flores may refer to:

- Jose Flores (infielder) (born 1973), American baseball player
- Jose Flores (jockey) (1960–2018), Peruvian-American jockey
- José Flores (Venezuelan footballer) (born 1967), Venezuelan footballer
- José Flores (weightlifter) (born 1930), Dutch Antillean weightlifter
- José David Flores (born 1971), Puerto Rican baseball coach
- José Felipe Flores (1751–1824), physician and medicine teaching pioneer in Central America
- José Flores Flores, Costa Rican longevity claimant
- José María Flores (1818–1866), officer in the Mexican Army
- José Oscar Flores (born 1971), Argentine footballer

== See also ==
- Juan José Flores (1800–1864), Venezuelan-born military general in Ecuador
- Flores (surname)
