= Carlos Flores Rico =

Mexican politician

- Born: 21 October 1952 (age 73); Ciudad Victoria, Tamaulipas, Mexico
- Occupation: Politician
- Political party: PRI

Carlos Flores Rico (born 21 October 1952) is a Mexican politician affiliated with the Institutional Revolutionary Party. As of 2014 he served as Deputy of the LIX and LXI Legislatures of the Mexican Congress as a plurinominal representative.
