= Walter Flores =

Walter Flores may refer to:

- Walter Flores (musician), Costa Rican musician
- Wálter Flores (footballer) (born 1978), Bolivian football midfielder
- Walter Vanqquenvaguer Flores (born 1987), Honduran footballer
