= Jeff Staggs =

American football player (1944–2014)

No. 81, 87
- Positions: Linebacker, Defensive end

Personal information
- Born: May 14, 1944; Elgin, Illinois, U.S.
- Died: September 17, 2014 (aged 70); El Cajon, California, U.S.
- Listed height: 6 ft 1 in (1.85 m)
- Listed weight: 240 lb (109 kg)

Career information
- High school: Point Loma (San Diego, California)
- College: BYU (1963); San Diego State (1965-1966)
- AFL draft: 1966: Red Shirt 3rd round, 26th overall pick

Career history
- San Diego Chargers (1967-1971); St. Louis Cardinals (1972–1973); San Diego Chargers (1974)

Awards and highlights
- San Diego State Aztec Hall of Fame (2009)

Career NFL/AFL statistics
- Fumble recoveries: 9
- Interceptions: 3
- Sacks: 4.5
- Stats at Pro Football Reference

Jeffrey Hugh Staggs (May 14, 1944 - September 17, 2014) was an American college and professional football player who played for the San Diego State Aztecs and San Diego Chargers.

== Early life ==
Staggs was born in Elgin, Illinois and raised in San Diego County. After graduating from Point Loma High School, he attended Brigham Young University and San Diego City College.

== Career ==
=== College ===
For two years, Staggs played college football at San Diego State University under coach Don Coryell, where he was a linebacker on the Aztecs' winning the Camellia Bowl in 1966 and was inducted into the Hall of Fame in 2009.

=== Professional ===
Staggs played professionally in the American Football League and the National Football League for the San Diego Chargers (1967–1972 and 1974) and the St. Louis Cardinals (1973). He was traded along with a second rounder in 1972 and a second and third rounder in 1973 from the Chargers to the Rams for Deacon Jones, Lee White and Greg Wojcik on January 29, 1972.

== Personal life ==
Staggs died in his sleep on September 17, 2014. After his death, Staggs's brain was donated to the Boston University CTE Center and Brain Bank, where it was found that he had suffered from chronic traumatic encephalopathy (CTE). He is one of at least 345 NFL players to be diagnosed after death with chronic traumatic encephalopathy (CTE), which is caused by repeated hits to the head. In 2018, a wrongful death lawsuit was filed on behalf of Staggs and other football players against the National Collegiate Athletic Association.

== See also ==
- Other American Football League players
