= David Flores =

David Flores may refer to:

- David P. Flores (born 1972), American artist, muralist and product designer
- David R. Flores (born 1968), jockey in American Thoroughbred horse racing
