= Chris Flores =

Chris Flores may refer to:

- Chris Flores (basketball) (born 1990), American basketball player
- Big Chris Flores (born 1970), American-Mexican record producer and sound engineer
