= Consuelo Flores =

Ecuadorian lawyer and politician

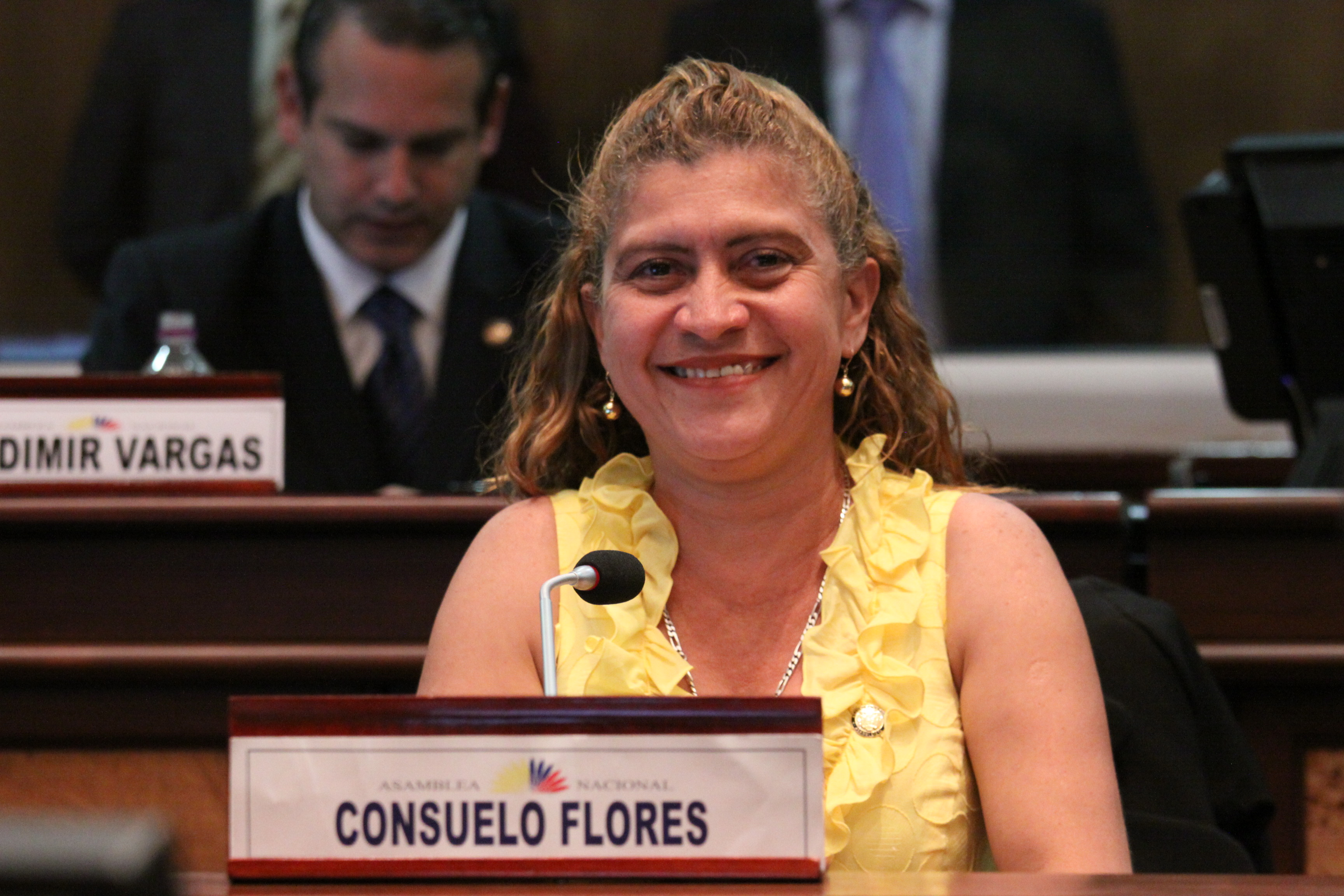

Member of the Municipal Council of Guayaquil
- Incumbent
- Assumed office May 14, 2014
- Constituency: Urban 2

Member of the National Assembly of Ecuador
- In office July 31, 2009 – May 14, 2013
- Constituency: Guayas

Personal details
- Born: Consuelo Piedad Flores Carrera; November 28, 1962 (age 62); Guayaquil, Ecuador
- Political party: Social Christian
- Education: University of Guayaquil
- Occupation: Lawyer, politician

Consuelo Piedad Flores Carrera (born November 28, 1962) is an Ecuadorian lawyer and politician. She was a member of the National Assembly from 2009 to 2013, and has been a member of the Municipal Council of Guayaquil since 2014.

== Biography ==
Consuelo Flores was born in Guayaquil on November 28, 1962. She completed her higher education at the University of Guayaquil, where she obtained a teaching degree, and at the Metropolitan University, where she obtained a law degree. Later she served as leader of the taxi drivers' union.

She began her political career in the 2009 legislative election, where she obtained a seat as a member of the National Assembly representing Guayas for the Social Christian Party.

For the 2013 legislative election, she tried to keep her seat, but was unsuccessful.

In 2014, she participated in the municipal elections as a candidate for councilor in Urban Constituency 2 of Guayaquil for the Social Christian Party, winning a seat along with nine members of her party. She retained her seat after the 2019 sectional elections. During her subsequent term, she has been the representative of mayor Cynthia Viteri on the board of the Guayaquil Municipal Transit Authority.
