= Daniel Flores (footballer, born 2000) =

Dominican Republic footballer

Personal information
- Full name: Daniel Leonardo Flores
- Date of birth: 11 November 2000 (age 25)
- Place of birth: Dominican Republic
- Height: 1.82 m (6 ft 0 in)
- Position: Midfielder

Team information
- Current team: Royal Pari F.C.
- Number: 6

Senior career*
Years	Team	Apps	(Gls)
2018-2020	Cibao		
2021	Moca FC	18	(0)
2022–23	Jarabacoa FC	38	(2)
2023	Cibao	11	(0)
2024	Royal Pari	17	(0)
2025-	Salcedo	49	(4)

International career^{‡}
2018-2020	Dominican Republic U20	5	(0)
2020-	Dominican Republic	15	(0)
- * Club domestic league appearances and goals as of 2 October 2026 ‡ National team caps and goals as of 5 October 2026

Daniel Leonardo Flores (born 11 November 2000) is a Dominican Republic footballer who plays as a midfielder for Royal Pari F.C. and the Dominican Republic national team.
