= Enrique Flores Flores =

Mexican politician

- Born: 18 November 1982 (age 43); San Luis Potosí, San Luis Potosí, Mexico
- Occupation: Politician
- Political party: PAN

Enrique Alejandro Flores Flores (Note: In this Mexican name, both the paternal and maternal surnames are Flores.) (born 18 November 1982) is a Mexican politician affiliated with the National Action Party (PAN). He served as a plurinominal deputy during the 62nd Congress (2012–2015) and from 2015 to 2017 in the Congress of San Luis Potosí.

== Life ==
Flores received his degree in law from the San Luis Potosí campus of the Universidad del Valle de México, with specialties in municipal law, notarial law, special crimes and customs law. He became an active PAN member in 2001 and became the legal director and later secretary for legal matters for the state party. From 2009 to 2011, he headed the municipal committee (CDM) of the PAN in the city of San Luis Potosí.

From 2012 to 2015, Flores represented San Luis Potosí and the second electoral region in the 62nd Congress. He served as a secretary of four commissions during his term, including Agriculture and Irrigation Systems, Municipal Development, Strengthening of Federalism and Transparency and Anticorruption.

Effective 6 February 2015, Flores resigned from the Chamber of Deputies to run for the state legislature of San Luis Potosí. Beginning on 30 June 2016, he headed the PAN parliamentary group; however, he was stripped of that position in March 2017 amidst a power struggle, though he decided to remain on the Political Coordination Board as part of a preexisting agreement that saw the post get transferred from the PRI to the PAN halfway through the legislature. The party studied removing Flores, alleging that he harmed its image.

On 13 June 2017, he resigned from the San Luis Potosí state legislature and the Political Coordination Board after the El Pulso de San Luis newspaper released a video of Flores offering to clear the debt history of municipal officials in exchange for 10 percent of the amount.
