= Otilia Choque =

Bolivian politician (born 1964)

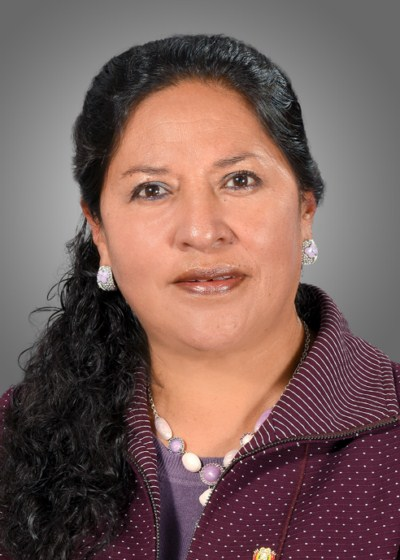
- Official portrait, 2017

Member of the Chamber of Deputies from Oruro
- In office 18 January 2015 – 3 November 2020
- Substitute: Jaime Gonzales
- Preceded by: Magdalena Chuca
- Succeeded by: Enrique Urquidi
- Constituency: Party list

Personal details
- Born: Otilia Choque Véliz; 13 December 1964 (age 61) Oruro, Bolivia
- Party: Movement for Socialism
- Education: Technical University of Oruro; Bolivian Technological University
- Occupation: Financial auditor; lawyer; politician

Otilia Choque Véliz (born 13 December 1964) is a Bolivian community organizer and politician who served as a party-list member of the Chamber of Deputies from Oruro from 2015 to 2020.

Born in Oruro, Choque spent her early career working in accounting and administration at various public and private entities. During this time, she was also active in grassroots organizing, presiding over her local neighborhood council before climbing the ranks to become vice president of the Departmental Federation of Neighborhood Councils.

The sector's alliance with the ruling Movement for Socialism resulted in her 2014 election to the Chamber of Deputies, where she held a variety of finance-related committee assignments. Following the conclusion of her tenure, Choque worked briefly as the regional manager of the Oruro Customs Office before being assigned to head the Ministry of Development Planning's Financial Unit.

== Early life and career ==
Otilia Choque was born on 13 December 1964 in Oruro. She studied general accounting at the Technical University of Oruro before going on to attend the Bolivian Technological University, where she graduated with a degree in customs law from the institute's Faculty of Law. A financial auditor by profession, Choque worked in cash and accounting at the Oruro Bus Interchange and spent eleven years as an administrator for the company Empresa Universo. During this time, she also worked independently as a food retailer.

An avid social activist, Choque was active in grassroots organizing across Oruro and held executive roles at a variety of community organizations around the city. She served twelve years as president of the SENTEC Neighborhood Council and was later elected to preside over the District 3 Community Association, a body that brought together over 120 neighborhood councils. By 2014, Choque had risen to become vice president of the Departmental Federation of Neighborhood Councils of Oruro, a conglomerate of the entire region's neighborhood associations.

== Chamber of Deputies ==
=== Election ===
Choque's first venture into politics occurred in 2005 when she was nominated to contest Oruro's circumscription 32 on behalf of the Social Union of Workers of Bolivia. The party, headed by Néstor García on the presidential ballot, experienced a lackluster showing at the polls, exiting dead last on election day. That poor electoral performance translated to general losses across the board, with Choque receiving less than a percent of the vote in her race.

Absent from the ballot in the 2009 contest, Choque returned to the electoral arena in 2014, this time as the chosen candidate of the Movement for Socialism (MAS-IPSP). Since 2005, the party had established a solid alliance with the country's neighborhood councils, through which it fostered close links with the urban lower class. For the councils, this relationship opened the door for numerous sectoral leaders to accede to parliamentary positions, as was the case with Choque, who was elected to the Chamber of Deputies off of the MAS's electoral list.

=== Tenure ===
Choque spent the majority of her parliamentary term on the Chamber of Deputies' Planning Commission, holding positions on its committees for all but one year of her tenure. Initially a member of the Budget Committee, she was later elected secretary of the Planning and Public Investment Committee for two terms. After a brief switch to the Human Rights Commission, during which time she oversaw the passing of a bill that raised the minimum age of child labor from 10 to 14, Choque returned to the Planning Commission, which she chaired in her final two years.

With the advent of the COVID-19 pandemic, Choque's commission pushed through a bill reducing the price of basic services by fifty percent and deferring the payment of interest and bank loans for the duration of and six months after the public health crisis. The legislation, passed on 1 April 2020, placed Choque in conflict with the transitional government of Jeanine Áñez, which she accused of violating the law by ordering financial authorities to resume the collection of payments within two months. "So that there are no malicious interpretations," Choque's commission ultimately amended the law to explicitly state that the deferral would conclude on the last day of 2020.

Nearing the end of her tenure, Choque was not nominated for reelection, a fact representative of both the MAS's general practice of renewing its legislative caucus each cycle as well as the preference of the neighborhood councils to rotate out their parliamentary representatives with different sectoral leaders. Although some MAS partisans in Oruro's circumscription 29 put her forward as their pre-candidate for the Oruro mayoralty, she did not receive the nomination, which ultimately went to Adhemar Wilcarani.

==== Commission assignments ====
- Planning, Economic Policy, and Finance Commission (President: 2019–2020)
  - Budget, Tax Policy, and Comptroller's Office Committee (2015–2016)
  - Planning and Public Investment Committee (Secretary: 2016–2018)
- Human Rights Commission (President: 2018–2019)

== Later political career ==
Following the conclusion of her parliamentary term, Choque worked briefly for two months as a public official in the Ministry of Development Planning. In early 2021, the national customs service appointed her to head its office in Oruro as the branch's regional manager. She held the position for approximately five-and-a-half months, at which point she was reassigned to the Ministry of Development Planning as head of its Financial Unit.

== Electoral history ==
Electoral history of Otilia Choque
| Year | Office | Party | Votes | | | Result | Ref. |
| Year | Office | Party | Total | % | P. | Result | Ref. |
|---|---|---|---|---|---|---|---|
| 2005 | Deputy | Social Union of Workers of Bolivia | 272 | 0.98% | 8th | Lost | |
| 2014 | Deputy | Movement for Socialism | 166,360 | 66.42% | 1st | Won | (Note: Presented on an electoral list. The data shown represents the share of the vote the entire party/alliance received in that constituency.) |
Source: Plurinational Electoral Organ | Electoral Atlas

Chamber of Deputies of Bolivia
| Preceded by Magdalena Chuca | Member of the Chamber of Deputies from Oruro; 2015–2020 | Succeeded by Enrique Urquidi |
