= Jorge Flores =

Jorge Flores may refer to:

- Jorge Flores (basketball) (1954–2025), Mexican basketball player
- Jorge Flores (politician) (born 1929), Peruvian politician
- Jorge Flores (soccer) (born 1977), American soccer player, played for Dallas Burn and United States national team
- Jorge Villafaña (born 1989), American soccer player, formerly known as Jorge Flores
- Jorge Luis Flores Sánchez, better known as Nina Flowers, Puerto Rican drag queen and reality television personality
- Jorge Flores Maradiaga (born 1972), Honduran decathlete
