= Jesús Flores (disambiguation) =

Jesús Flores (born 1984) is a Venezuelan-born Major League Baseball player.

Jesús Flores may also refer to:

- Jesús Flores (boxer) (born 1973), Mexican boxer
- Jesús Flores (diver) (1912–?), Mexican diver
- Jesús Flores Magón (1871–1930), Mexican lawyer, journalist and politician
- Jesús Flores Morfín (1953–2016), Mexican politician, PAN
- Jesús Morales Flores (born 1946), Mexican politician, PRI
- Jesús Silva-Herzog Flores (1935–2017), Mexican economist and politician
