= Pedro Flores =

Pedro Flores may refer to:

- Pedro Flores (bishop) (died 1540)
- Pedro Flores (boxer) (born 1951), Mexican world boxing champion
- Pedro Flores (composer) (1894–1979), Puerto Rican composer
- Pedro Flores Garcia (1897–1967), Spanish painter
- Pedro Flores (inventor) (1896–1963), Filipino American who developed the modern yo-yo
- Pedro Flores Maldonado (born 1984), Mexican film director, screenwriter and actor
