= Florez =

- Leonese and Castilian coat of arms
- Current region: Spain, Colombia, Peru, United States
- Earlier spellings: Florus, Floro, Froila
- Origin: New Kingdom of Granada, Spanish Empire, France
- Distinctions: Asturias, Leonese, Visigoths

Florez (or Flórez with the abbreviation) is a Spanish surname of Asturian, Leonese, and Visigothic origin.

Through the expansion of the Spanish Empire, the familial name spread across the Western hemisphere. The surname is associated with some of the earliest and most well-established families of the Spanish nobility during the Age of Discovery, having settled in regions such as the New Kingdom of Granada. These early European settlers were some of the first to reach the New World in the 16th century CE in voyages set forth by the Spanish Crown.

== Variants of the name ==
Though the spelling Florez is a widely used and standardized spelling of the surname, other spellings of the name include Flórez, Flores, Flóriz, Floriz, Flóraz, Floraz, Flor, Florus, Florán, Floran, Florián, and Froila.

== Family history ==
The surname is believed to have originated in northern Spain. The given name "Floro" is derived from the Latin name Florus, which means "prosperous." The root name "Florus" was used in early Christian and ancient Roman contexts; for instance, the Christian martyr Saint Florus helped popularize Florus/Floro in medieval Iberia.

The name "Flórez" is thought to be a patronymic surname derived from the given name "Froila," an old Visigothic (Germanic) name used in the northern Spanish kingdoms of Asturias and León. Froila gets its name from the Gothic word 'frauja,' which means "lord" or "master." The name is written as Froila, Fruela, or Froilán in early medieval Latinized documents. Froilaz or Froílaz (son of Froila) was the patronymic form of Froila, which eventually phonetically evolved into Flórez. Vowel shifts and the gradual softening and simplification of consonants were common in Asturian-Leonese dialects.

A nobleman of Roman and Visigothic descent named Pelagius was the founder of the Kingdom of Asturias, the catalyst behind the Reconquista, the progenitor of the Asturian-Leonese dynasty, and the maternal grandfather of Froila I of Asturias, the king of Asturias in the 8th century CE. Froila II of Asturias, or Fruela II, was the king of Asturias, León, and Galicia between 910 and 925 CE.

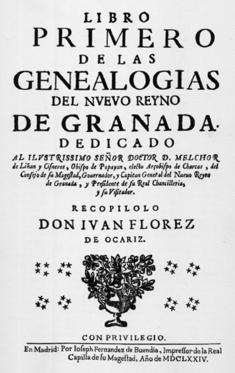
Genealogies of the New Kingdom of Granada by Don Florez de Ocariz.

Given that Flórez is thought to be derived from Froila, a name associated with Visigothic nobility in the Kingdom of León, early arrivals with the surname in the Americas may have claimed descent from an Asturian-Leonese warrior lineage, giving them status in colonial society. The name Froila (or Fruela) was common among the nobility and royalty of early medieval Asturias and León, and descendants were often given patronymics like Froilaz, or later Flórez.

The surname was prevalent in northern Spain and the Kingdom of Naples. It eventually spread to Spanish-speaking countries in the New World (the Americas) via migration and colonization. The surname Flórez appears in military and noble records from medieval Spain. Some lineages have established coats of arms, which are included in Spanish heraldry. Several political, artistic, and religious figures have used it throughout Spanish and Latin American history. The Flórez surname is most commonly traced to northern Spain, specifically Asturias, León, and Cantabria. According to historical records, the Flórez surname is still common in these areas as well as the New Kingdom of Granada (modern-day Colombia), indicating its close ties to the northern Spanish nobility.

In the 17th century CE, a Spanish historian with the surname Flórez, who worked as a chamberlain in the New Kingdom of Granada, claimed to have had access to various archives, including those of the royal court of Santa Fe, which contained documents detailing the conquistadors' services, royal decrees, and ecclesiastical affairs. He utilized these resources to create his seminal work, "Genealogías del Nuevo Reino de Granada," which sheds light on the region's colonial history.

Flórez de Ocariz catalogues the families, beginning with the oldest, and includes the ruling families of the first settlements, the founders of the first cities, conquistador descendants, and Spanish Crown officials. The Flórez family was one of the earliest known European arrivals in the New World during the 16th and 17th centuries CE. Manuel Antonio Flórez, Joaquín Flórez-Osorio, Enrique Flórez, Domingo Flórez, Alonso Flórez, Gregorio de Valdés Flórez, Bartolome Flórez, and Antonio Flórez de Valdes were among the notable people with the surname in America during early Spanish colonization. Modern notable Spanish-born people with the surname include, for example, Ángeles Flórez Peón, Darío Fernández Flórez, and Fernando Castro Flórez.

== Notable people with the surname ==
=== Latin America ===
- Eduardo Posada Flórez (born 1942), Colombian physicist
- Eduardo Flórez (born 1944), Mexican Olympic pentathlete
- Fátima Flórez (born 1978), Argentine actress and comedian
- Guillermo Rivera Flórez (born 1970), Colombian politician
- Juan Diego Flórez (born 1973), Peruvian operatic tenor
- Julio Flórez (born 1867), Colombian poet
- Lina Flórez (born 1984), Colombian Olympic hurdler
- Nelson Flórez (born 1974), Colombian athlete
- Ricardo Flórez (born 1893), Peruvian painter
- Vladimir Flórez (born 1963), Colombian journalist

=== United States of America ===
- Dean Florez (born 1963), American politician
- Fran Florez (born 1988), American politician, mother of Dean Florez
- Joey Florez (born 1993), American scholar and cultural critic
- Luis de Florez (born 1889), American Navy admiral and aviator

=== Europe ===
- Alicia Flórez (born 2004), Spanish basketball player
