= Deisy Choque =

Bolivian footballer (born 1997)

Personal information
- Full name: Deisy Choque Aspeti
- Date of birth: 9 March 1997 (age 29)
- Position: Centre back

International career^{‡}
Years	Team	Apps	(Gls)
2014	Bolivia U20		
2017	Bolivia	1	(0)
- ‡ National team caps and goals as of 9 April 2017

Deisy Choque Aspeti (born 9 March 1997) is a Bolivian footballer who plays as a centre back. She has been a member of the Bolivia women's national team.

== Early life ==
Choque hails from Tropico.

== International career ==
Choque represented Bolivia at the 2014 South American U-20 Women's Championship. At senior level, she played a friendly against Brazil in 2017.
