= Ignacio Flores =

Ignacio Flores may refer to:

- Ignacio Flores (Mexican footballer) (1953–2011), Mexican football defender
- Ignacio Flores (Pacificator of Peru) (1733–1786)
- Ignacio Flores (Uruguayan footballer) (born 1990), Uruguayan football striker
