= Richard Choque =

Bolivian serial killer and rapist

- Born: Richard Choque Flores; November 9, 1988 (age 37); Bolivia
- Other names: Haide Mitzi Flores Alarcón; Mauricio Terán
- Conviction: Murder x4
- Penalty: 30 years imprisonment

Details
- Victims: 4+
- Span of crimes: 2011 – 2021 (confirmed)
- Country: Bolivia
- State: La Paz
- Date apprehended: 2021
- Imprisoned at: Chonchocoro Prison

Richard Choque Flores (born November 9, 1988) is a Bolivian serial killer and rapist who killed at least two women in 2021, shortly after being released from a prior conviction. For the latter crimes, he was sentenced to 30 years imprisonment.

The severity of his crimes, the allegations that he had raped upwards of 77 women and possibly murdered others, and the fact that he escalated his brutality after his parole led to widespread discussion about the treatment of violent offenders in the country.

== Crimes ==
Choque's crimes gained notoriety in Bolivia after it became known that, due to judicial irregularities, he was released from prison while serving a sentence for killing a young woman in 2013. On December 24, 2019, Justice Rafael Alcón ordered that he be placed under house arrest for 18 months, despite the fact that he was supposed to serve a 30-year sentence and had more than 17 complaints lodged against him - his reasoning for the release was a supposed incurable disease. Choque is said to have been released from prison after paying a bribe of $3,500, after rejecting the offer of a lawyer who had asked for $10,000 for the same service.

Shortly after being paroled, he created a fake account on Facebook under the name 'Haide Mitzi Flores Alarcón' and, through it, posted advertisements on social media where he proclaimed to seek domestic help in exchange for a hefty sum of money. Reportedly, more than 77 women responded to his ads, a majority of whom were poor or had family issues.

Choque's modus operandi consisted of contacting the victims and asking for either sexual services or for them to deliver a package, whereupon he told them to visit a location of his choosing. Upon doing so, he pretended to be a policeman and accused them of drug trafficking. Choque would then force the victim to "confess" to the crime in video recordings and, in exchange for not turning them over to the police, he would then extort them for money or sex.

== Arrest ==
After several months of investigations, the bodies of two young women who had disappeared in May and August 2021 were found, one of them buried near a house in El Alto, where Choque lived with his sister and mother. On February 2, the skeletal remains of the second victim were found buried in another property owned by the family, which later turned out to be the same place where Choque had buried Blanca Rubí Limachi, the woman he was convicted of killing in 2013. In addition to this, the remains of Choque's first cousin, Fidel Lecón, who had been missing since May 19, 2011, as well as another grave supposedly meant for a future victim, were also discovered.

Upset by the mishandling of the case, a group of neighbors attempted to burn down the murderer's home. Similarly, since the police did not seal the property, several people stole potential evidence in the form of clothes and jewellery either out of anger or while searching for clues regarding missing relatives. Mothers of missing women also came to the house hoping to find a clue about their daughters' fates, searching through burnt clothes and other scorched belongings.

== Victims ==
=== Confirmed ===
==== Fidel Lecón Choque ====
Lecón, who was Choque's 18-year-old first cousin, disappeared on May 19, 2011. At the time, he had been promised by Richard that he would help him get into the Army Sergeants' Military School in Cochabamba in exchange for $5,000. Even after he vanished, Richard continued to claim to Fidel's mother that he was still alive and asked that he provide financial assistance to further her son's military career. Eventually, Lecón's mother began suspecting that Fidel had been killed and filed a complaint against Richard, but it was dismissed due to lack of evidence. When Fidel's body was found, an autopsy determined that he had been poisoned and that he had been decapitated post-mortem. Choque was sentenced to 30 years in prison for this homicide.

==== Blanca Rubí Limachi ====
Choque's first definitively confirmed victim was Blanca Rubí Limachi, who disappeared on November 20, 2013. Eight days later, her body was found buried underneath Choque's family home. Reportedly, he had contacted her through Facebook under the name 'Mauricio Terán' and had promised to help her get into the Military College, but Choque instead kidnapped, tortured, sexually assaulted and ultimately killed her.

The day after Limachi's disappearance, Choque contacted her mother through her cellphone and demanded $20,000 ransom in exchange for the safe return of her daughter. As the woman did not have the necessary amount, she contacted the Fuerza Especial de Lucha Contra el Crimen (FELCC), who instructed her to do as the kidnapper said. After leaving the money in a box at the requested location, the investigators followed Choque to his home after he picked it up, where they arrested him and an accomplice. In 2015, both Choque and the accomplice, José Luis Casilla Machaca, were found guilty and sentenced to 30 years imprisonment without parole.

==== Lucy Maya Ramírez Zambrana and Iris Maylin Villca Choque ====
The 17-year-old Ramírez disappeared on May 17, 2021, and after her body was discovered, it was determined that she had died from blunt force trauma to the head. Sometime after her disappearance, Choque contacted her family and demanded 70,000 bolivianos in exchange for her release. Ramírez's mother was then sent a photo depicting dismembered corpses, followed by a threatening messages warning them not to contact the police or her daughter would end up the same way.

On August 27, 15-year-old Villca disappeared under similar circumstances. Like the previous victim, Choque contacted the family and demanded 50,000 bolivianos as ransom. According to her family members, he sent them photographs of Villca, still alive and tied up in a bed.

=== Suspected ===
==== Other possible victims ====
During the raid on Choque's house, the daughter of a chef named José Luis Mamani García, who had been missing for some time, found her father's hat and apron inside the house. Although it has not been conclusively proven that Choque is connected to his disappearance or possible death, authorities revealed that the two were acquainted and that the last phone call registered on Mamani's cellphone originated from Choque's house.

It has not been ruled out that there are other victims as well, as Choque is known to have traveled extensively to the cities of Cochabamba and Santa Cruz de la Sierra.

== Evaluation, conviction and imprisonment ==
After undergoing a psychiatric evaluation, Jhonny Aguilera, general commander of the Bolivian Police, announced that Choque was diagnosed with an antisocial personality disorder with psychopathic inclinations, most notable of which were aggressiveness and lack of remorse.

In the aftermath of his arrest, Choque was charged with human trafficking, pimping, production of pornography, extortion, illegal possession of a firearm and two counts of murder. He was found guilty on all counts and sentenced to 30 years imprisonment without parole, whereupon he was transferred to the Chonchocoro Prison. His date of release is January 26, 2052.

== Reactions ==
On January 31, 2022, a women's march against male violence and corruption in the justice system took place in several cities across Bolivia. In the La Paz Department, the march started from Choque's house and finished at the regional Department Court of Justice, where dolls representing murderers, rapists and corrupt judges were hung at the doors. Marina Mamani, Ramírez's aunt, made a speech during the march exclaiming that "if [the judges] had not let him leave, this never would have happened."

There was a large presence of ethnic Aymara women at the march, both from the countryside and the city, who protested the fact that the impoverished had to resort to paying bribes in order to get justice and that at least 135 violent criminals convicted of rape and murder were not serving their sentences. As a result of the protests, a judicial commission was formed to investigate judges and prosecutors who had favored defendants accused or convicted of such crimes.

On March 8, 2022, during the march to commemorate International Women's Day, dozens of women and activists denounced the corruption surrounding the Choque case. The subsequent media coverage uncovered a wide network of corruption including judges, lawyers, doctors, social workers and others. Perhaps most shockingly, it revealed that Choque was a "delegate prosecutor" in the San Pedro Prison, despite the fact that he should have been ineligible for that position due to the severity of his crime. As part of the position, he served on the prison board, was allowed to leave the premises unsupervised and extorted fellow inmates. As a result of these accusations, brought to light by activist María Galindo, the prison warden was dismissed.

There were also calls for chemical castration and the restoration of the death penalty. A senator for Creemos, Erick Morón, requested that the Penal Code be modified to make chemical castration viable. In a similar vein, Congressman Héctor Arce, a member of Movement for Socialism, requested that the death penalty be applied for Choque and others who commit similar crimes, despite the fact it has been abolished. Likewise, the Bartolina Sisa Women's Confederation suggested forced labor for those guilty of murder and rape, as well as longer sentences, including the legalization of life imprisonment, since the maximum penalty available in Bolivia is 30 years.

== See also ==
- List of serial killers by country
- List of serial rapists
