= Armando Flores =

Mexican performer of Christian music

Armando Flores / Proyecto JES
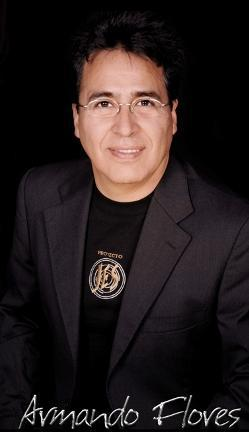

Background information
- Birth name: Armando Flores Rojas
- Origin: Mexico City, Mexico
- Genres: Latin Pop; Rock; Gospel
- Instrument(s): Vocals, guitar, keyboards
- Labels: Promarsa music
- Website: http://www.promarsamusic.com/

Armando Flores (born in Mexico City) is a Mexican musician and producer known for his contributions to Christian worship music.

== Biography ==
Flores grew up in an Evangelical household and developed an early interest in music. He studied accounting at the Universidad Nacional Autónoma de México and law at the Universidad Tecnológica de México.

At the age of 17, he became involved in Christian music, joining a worship band at his church before forming Cristo es el Camino, which recorded multiple albums between 1975 and 1983. In 1984, the group transitioned to La Banda Blanca, incorporating elements of the grupero style.

In 1991, he founded Promarsa Music, a company focused on Christian music production and distribution. That same year, he organized a praise and worship conference in Mexico City featuring various Christian musicians and speakers. Later in 1991, he established Proyecto JES, a Christian music and ministry initiative.

== Proyecto JES ==
In 1992, Armando Flores founded Proyecto JES (Project Jesus Is Lord), named after a passage from Philippians 2:10-11. The initiative focused on evangelistic concert tours between 1992 and 2008.

== Discography ==
Year	Title	Label
1994	Proyecto JES niños; La Tierra Celestial	Promarsa music
1995	Proyecto JES 3	Promarsa music
1997	Proyecto JES En Concierto	Promarsa music
1997	JES niños 2; El Gran Concierto	Promarsa music
1999	Proyecto JES Alabanza en Estudio	Promarsa music
1999	JES HIMNOS DE LA VIDA CRISTIANA	Promarsa music
1999	Noche de Paz; Armando Flores / Proyecto JES	Promarsa music
2000	Vangelio A’	Promarsa music
2002	Proyecto JES Himnos 2: Me hirió el pecado	Promarsa music
2003	Tócame	Promarsa music
2004	Música de Ministración	Promarsa music
2007	Proyecto JES en vivo; Edición Doble	Promarsa music
2007	La Banda Blanca; Voy a Contarte Ahora	Promarsa music
2007	Maestro de Galilea	Promarsa music
2008	Música para Alimentar tu Corazón	Promarsa music

=== Special Participations ===
- 2000 Sembrando en Cuba
- 2003 Celebración Reina Valera 400 años (Sociedad Bíblica de México)

== Other projects ==
- Proyecto MIES
- Serie 30 minutos
- Proyecto JES niños
