= TEMPOREX =

American singer and songwriter (born 1999)

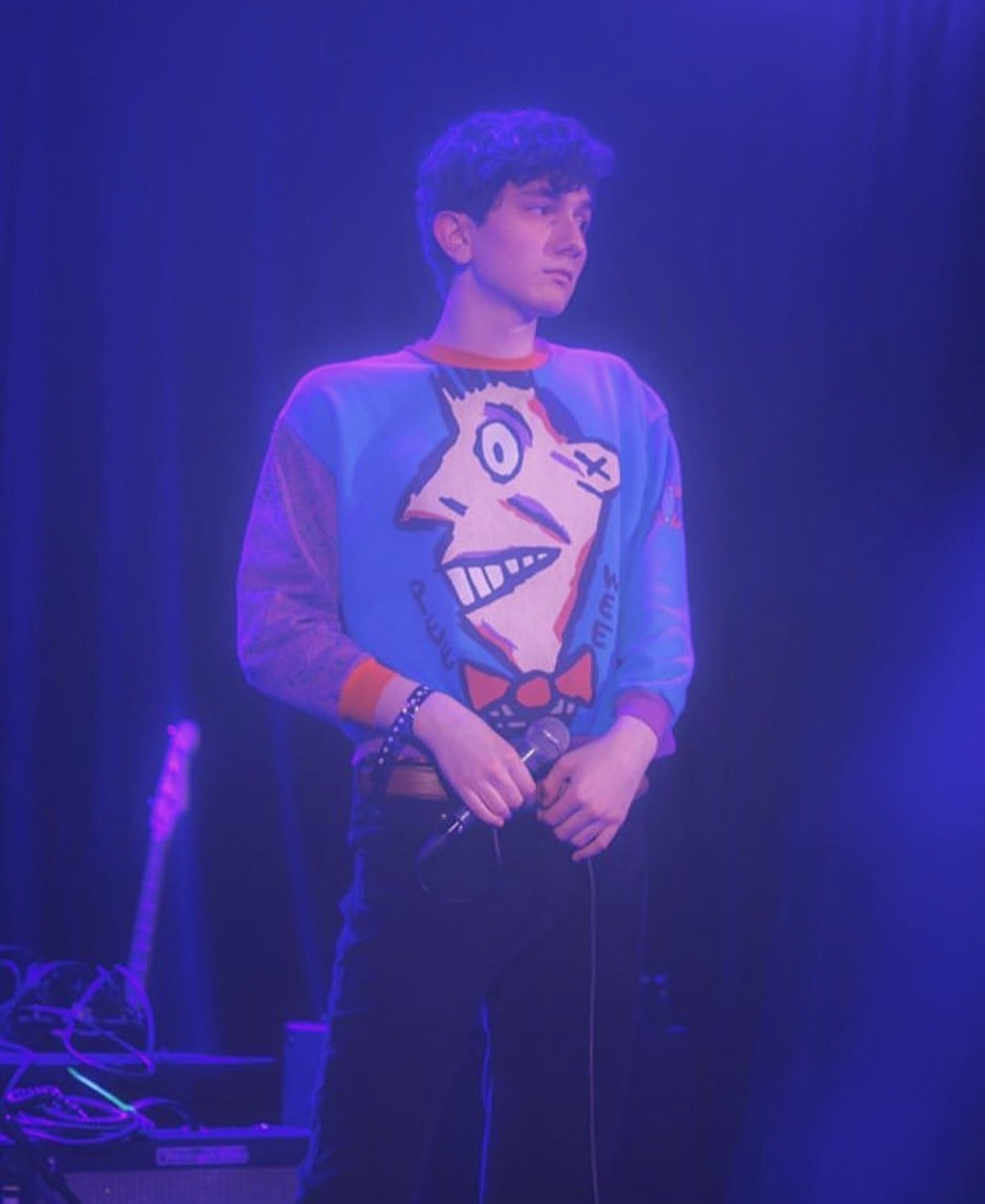
- Flores in 2018

Background information
- Born: Joseph Noah Flores; 20 October 1999 (age 27); New York, New York, U.S.
- Genres: indiepop; synthpop; bedroom pop
- Occupation: Singer, producer, visual artist
- Years active: 2017–present

Joseph Flores (born October 20, 1999), better known by his stage name TEMPOREX, is an American producer, songwriter, and visual artist from San Diego, California. He is most known for his songs "Nice Boys" and "Numbers" which went viral on social media.

Flores began making music at a very young age and gained recognition for his blend of synth–pop, indie pop, and nostalgic electronic production. In 2017 Flores released an album called Care, which included his most popular song, "Nice Boys".

== Discography ==
=== Studio albums ===
- Care (2017)
- Bowling (2021)
- Fantastic Machine (2026)

== Songs ==
- Nice Boys (2017)
- Numbers (2017)
- Care (2017)
- Don’t Care (2017)
- Hi (2017)
- No Sleep (2017)
- Daydream (2017)
- Around You (2017)
- Alone Time (2017)
- Lost In a Flower Field (2017)
- The Right Place (2017)
- Open Letter (2017)
- Let’s Keep It Virtual (2017)
- Vacant Eyes (2017)
- Okay (2017)
- I Should Change (2017)
- Georgie (2018)
- Sweet Sundae (2018)
- Delayed (2021)
- Tournament Hill (2021)
- Bad Pin (2021)
- U Open Up a Window (2021)
- At Peace (2021)
- New Lane (2021)
- Batter (2021)
- Milton Post (2021)
- Plastic Lester (2021)
- Gui (2021)
- Little Star (2021)
- Castles (2024)
- Waterhole (2026)
- Real Time (2026)
