= Dan Flores (American football) =

American football player (born 1977)

Daniel Francisco Flores (born June 12, 1977) is a former professional football player who currently operates several businesses in New York City; a corporate wellness/fitness firm and a wine and spirits shop in Bed Stuy, Brooklyn. He currently resides in Bed Stuy, Brooklyn with his wife Natasha, and three children; Glory, Grace and Geordan. Flores is from East Flatbush, Brooklyn. Flores played at Brooklyn Tech High School. Flores played four seasons at Stony Brook University as a tight end.

== Early life ==
Flores grew up an only child while raised by his grandparents George and Sarah Paine. He does have 2 half siblings; a sister named Jahnee, and a brother Jadan.

== Career ==
In 2000, Flores was a member of the Flint Flames in the Indoor Football League. Flores later signed with the New Jersey Gladiators in 2001 in the Arena Football League. During his season with the Gladiators he played full back and linebacker. Offensively, he rushed for 51 yards on 16 carries and scored 2 touchdowns. Defensively he made five tackles and one sack.
