= Mario Choque =

Bolivian politician (born 1954)

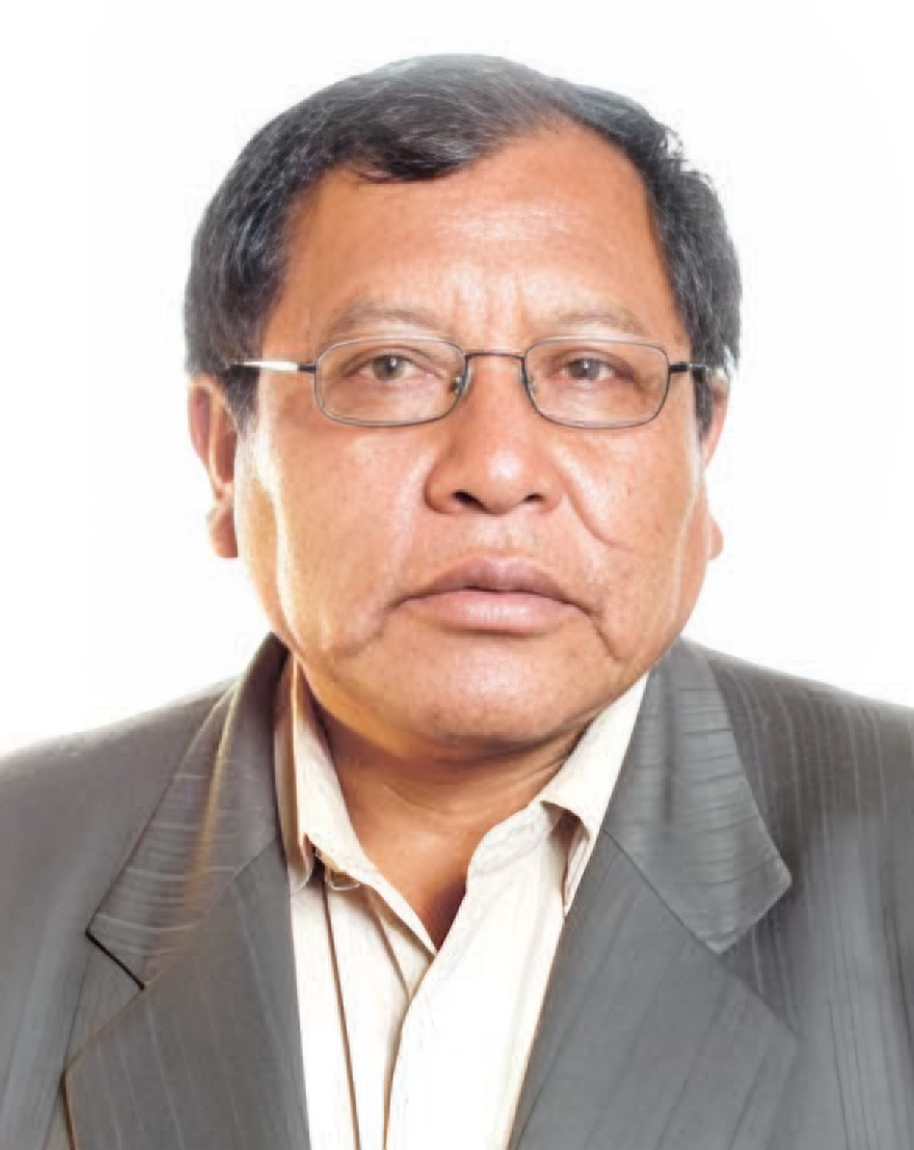
- Official portrait, 2012

Senator for Oruro
- In office 19 January 2010 – 18 January 2015
- Substitute: Nelly Ancasi (2010–2011) (Note: Died in office.)
- Preceded by: Seat established
- Succeeded by: Plácida Espinoza

Personal details
- Born: Mario Choque Gutiérrez; 18 July 1954 (age 72) Totoral, Oruro, Bolivia
- Party: Movement for Socialism
- Education: Technical University of Oruro
- Occupation: Economist; politician

Mario Choque Gutiérrez (born 18 July 1954) is a Bolivian economist and politician who served as senator for Oruro from 2010 to 2015.

Choque studied economics at the Technical University of Oruro and developed a years-long career as a minor official in the Vinto Metallurgical Enterprise. Choque worked from 1979 until the state company's privatization in 2000, remained involved in mining operations for a short time thereafter, then branched out into consulting. He lent his services to various organizations throughout the 2000s, including the Oruro Telecommunications Cooperative and the Inter-American Development Bank.

Alongside his career work, Choque was also active as a community organizer. He served as president of the Poopó Vigilance Committee from 1999 to 2003, also holding positions at the regional and national level, and chaired the Juan de la Salle Neighborhood Council in the city of Oruro from 2007 to 2010. Sympathetic toward left-wing causes, Choque joined the Movement for Socialism in 2002 and was elected senator for the party in 2009. After just one term centered on economic policy, he was not nominated for reelection.

== Early life and career ==
=== Early life and education ===
Mario Choque was born on 18 July 1954 in Totoral, a mining settlement situated in the Pazña Municipality of eastern Oruro's Poopó Province. The second in a family of siblings, his father made a living as a mineworker and later merchant, while his mother was a homemaker who operated a small store. He completed his secondary studies in the city of Oruro, at the Aniceto Arce National School, and fulfilled his term of mandatory military service in Guaqui, La Paz, as part of the 5th Lanza Cavalry Regiment.

Following his discharge, Choque returned to Oruro to pursue higher education. He attended the Technical University of Oruro, graduating with degrees in economics and statistics from the institute's Faculty of Economic, Financial, and Administrative Sciences – where he also worked as an aide. Choque was later brought on as a docent at the university's School of Business Administration, where he taught lectures on microeconomics for some time.

=== Career and community organizing ===
Concurrent with his academic activities, Choque also pursued a career in the mining sector. He held low- to mid-level positions within the Vinto Metallurgical Enterprise from 1979 on, remaining employed at the state company for over two decades until his dismissal in 2000 following the mine's privatization. During this time, Choque also did work in consulting, lending his services to the German firm Berzelius on projects to revitalize the Vinto mine's internal operations.

Following the mine's closure, Choque remained briefly involved in other mining operations: he served as an administrator at the Huanuni Mining Company and held posts within the Bolivian Mining Corporation. From there, Choque diversified his portfolio; alongside his employment at the Oruro branch of the National Agricultural Health and Food Safety Service, he continued to consult for the Oruro Telecommunications Cooperative from 1996 to 2007 and the Inter-American Development Bank from 2002 to 2006 – for the latter, he also served as the organization's regional supervisor in Oruro.

Outside career work, Choque also gained distinction as a community organizer. He became especially involved in areas of community engagement established by Bolivia's Popular Participation Law, particularly as a member of various vigilance committees – bodies composed of civil society organizations put in place to foster lines of communication with local governments and grant the populace a greater degree of social control over their municipal authorities. As head of his sector's OTB, (Note: Spanish: Organización Territorial de Base; lit. 'Grassroots Organization'. OTBs were constituted from organized groups of indigenous peoples, campesino communities, or neighborhood councils, and operated as the means for these to gain state recognition as juridicial entities. OTBs within each canton of a municipality constituted the membership of that region's vigilance committee.) Choque held membership in and served as president of the vigilance committee in Poopó Municipality from 1999 to 2003. The position allowed his ascent to the departmental association of vigilance committees, which he chaired in 2001, and later the national association, where he held a seat on the directorate from 2001 to 2003. In the ensuing years, Choque also presided over the Juan de la Salle Neighborhood Council in the city of Oruro from 2007 to 2010 and served as secretary of finance for the regional capital's fifth district.

== Chamber of Senators ==
=== Election ===
Choque's left-wing ideological sympathies date to his university days, bolstered by his subsequent opposition to the state-led process of privatization that ended his years-long mining career. He first joined the fledgling Movement for Socialism (MAS) in 2002, the only party of which he was ever a member. He remained affiliated with the MAS through its rise to government and into 2009 when he won a seat in the Senate representing the party in Oruro. As the lowest-ranked candidate on the MAS's senatorial slate, Choque's election benefitted from a change in the Bolivian electoral system, (Note: Aside from a general increase in the number of senators per department – from three to four – the system of apportioning seats was also changed from one of top-two majoritarian representation to one of proportional representation, making it possible for one party to win all four Senate seats in any given region.) coupled with his party's near-clean sweep of Oruro's parliamentary delegation that cycle.

=== Tenure ===
Choque's low-profile Senate tenure centered largely on economic policy, as a member and later chair of the upper chamber's Finance Commission.^{[§]} Topics of budget, tax policy, and the allocation of economic resources toward infrastructure and rural development projects – with a special emphasis on eradicating extreme poverty in Oruro's least-developed regions – occupied Choque's agenda during his first years in office. The second half of his term also saw him designated as a representative to the Andean Parliament, where he served as vice president for Bolivia from 2014 to 2015. At the end of his term in 2014, Choque was not listed for reelection, even as the MAS once again won nearly every seat in Oruro's delegation.

=== Commission assignments ===
- Planning, Economic Policy, and Finance Commission (President: 2011–2013)
  - Planning, Budget, Public Investment, and Comptroller's Office Committee (Secretary: 2010–2011)
- Social Policy, Education, and Health Commission
  - Housing, Employment Law, Occupational Safety, and Social Welfare Committee (Secretary: 2013–2015)

== Electoral history ==
Electoral history of Mario Choque
Year	Office	Party	Votes			Result	Ref.
Year	Office	Party	Total	%	P.	Result	Ref.
2009	Senator	Movement for Socialism	178,363	79.46%	1st	Won	(Note: Presented on an electoral list. The data shown represents the share of the vote the entire party/alliance received in that constituency.)
Source: Plurinational Electoral Organ | Electoral Atlas

Senate of Bolivia
Seat established	Senator for Oruro; 2010–2015; Served alongside: Sandra Soriano, Andrés Villca, Roxana Camargo	Succeeded by Plácida Espinoza
