= Poopó (town) =

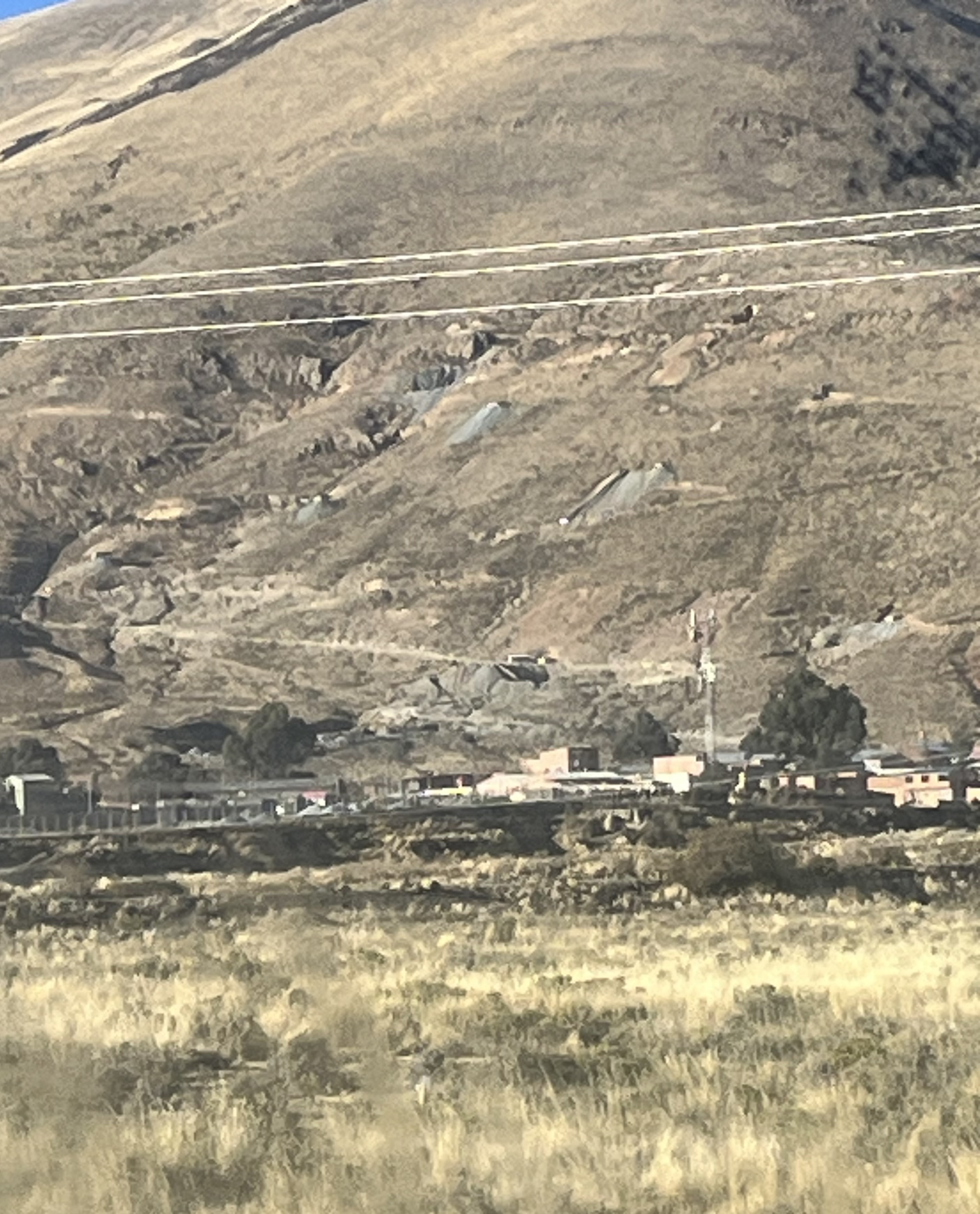

- Location in Bolivia
- Coordinates: 18°23′S 66°58′W
- Country: Bolivia
- Department: Oruro Department
- Province: Poopó Province
- Municipality: Poopó Municipality
- Canton: Poopó Canton
- Elevation: 12,329 ft (3,758 m)

Population (2012)
  - Total: 3,618
- Time zone: UTC-4 (BOT)

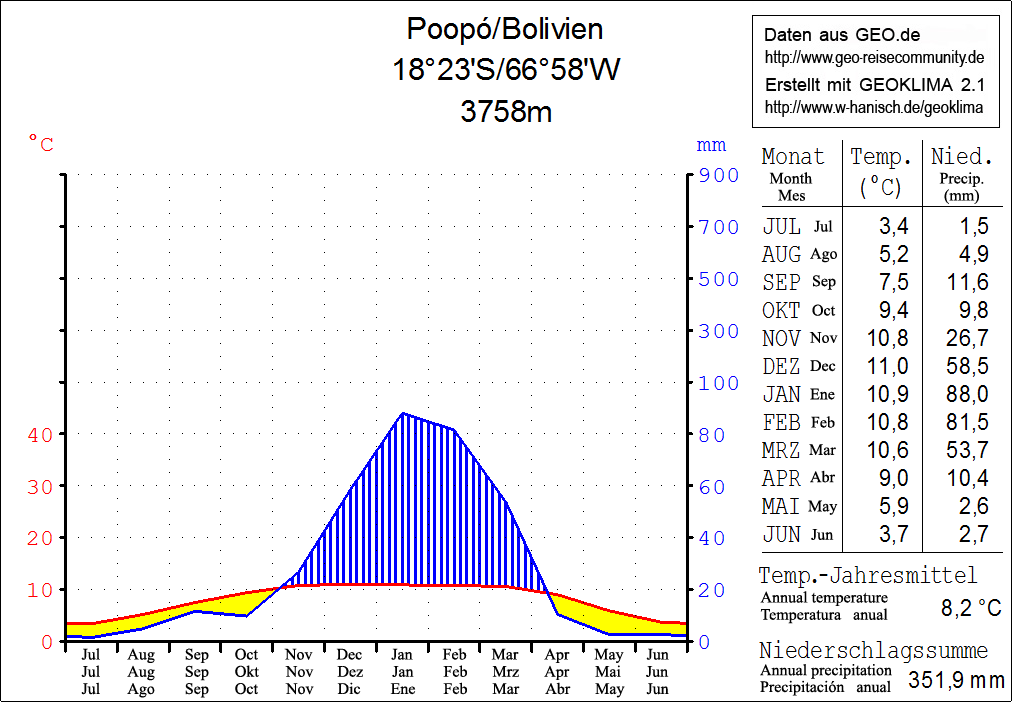
Climate chart

Poopó is a Bolivian town, capital of the province of Poopó, in the department of Oruro. Emma Heberlein is the mayor.

The economy is dominated by the mining industry. There are several underground mines few kilometers north from the town. A processing plant is located in the west.

== Climate ==
Climate data for Poopó (Pazña), elevation 3,710 m (12,170 ft)
Month	Jan	Feb	Mar	Apr	May	Jun	Jul	Aug	Sep	Oct	Nov	Dec	Year
Mean daily maximum °C (°F)	20.9 (69.6)	19.9 (67.8)	20.5 (68.9)	20.0 (68.0)	17.2 (63.0)	15.4 (59.7)	15.6 (60.1)	17.7 (63.9)	19.6 (67.3)	21.6 (70.9)	22.9 (73.2)	22.1 (71.8)	19.5 (67.0)
Daily mean °C (°F)	12.2 (54.0)	11.8 (53.2)	11.2 (52.2)	9.0 (48.2)	5.2 (41.4)	3.1 (37.6)	3.3 (37.9)	5.5 (41.9)	8.0 (46.4)	9.5 (49.1)	11.4 (52.5)	12.1 (53.8)	8.5 (47.3)
Mean daily minimum °C (°F)	3.5 (38.3)	3.7 (38.7)	2.0 (35.6)	−2.1 (28.2)	−6.8 (19.8)	−9.1 (15.6)	−9.2 (15.4)	−6.8 (19.8)	−3.6 (25.5)	−2.7 (27.1)	−0.2 (31.6)	2.1 (35.8)	−2.4 (27.6)
Average precipitation mm (inches)	121 (4.8)	126 (5.0)	94 (3.7)	17 (0.7)	3 (0.1)	1 (0.0)	2 (0.1)	12 (0.5)	24 (0.9)	21 (0.8)	30 (1.2)	85 (3.3)	536 (21.1)
Source: Plataforma digital única del Estado Peruano
