= Pantaleón Dalence Province =

Pantaleón Dalence
- Province
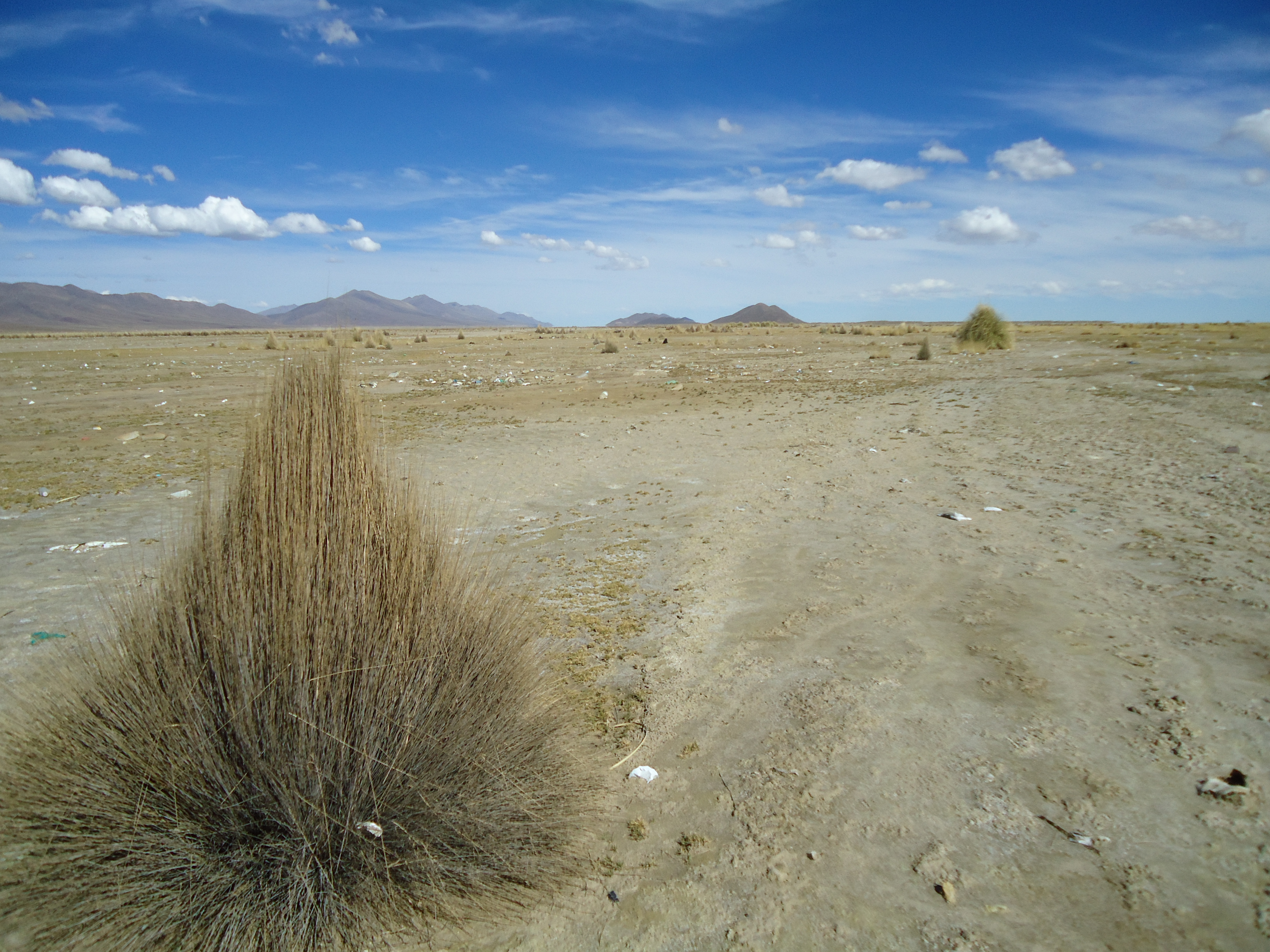
- The Asanaki mountain range as seen from Machaqa Marka with Qurimina, Pepitu (4.478 m) and Wila Ch'ankha on the left and Iswaya Island (3.879 m) (lying in the Desaguadero River) in the middle of the picture.

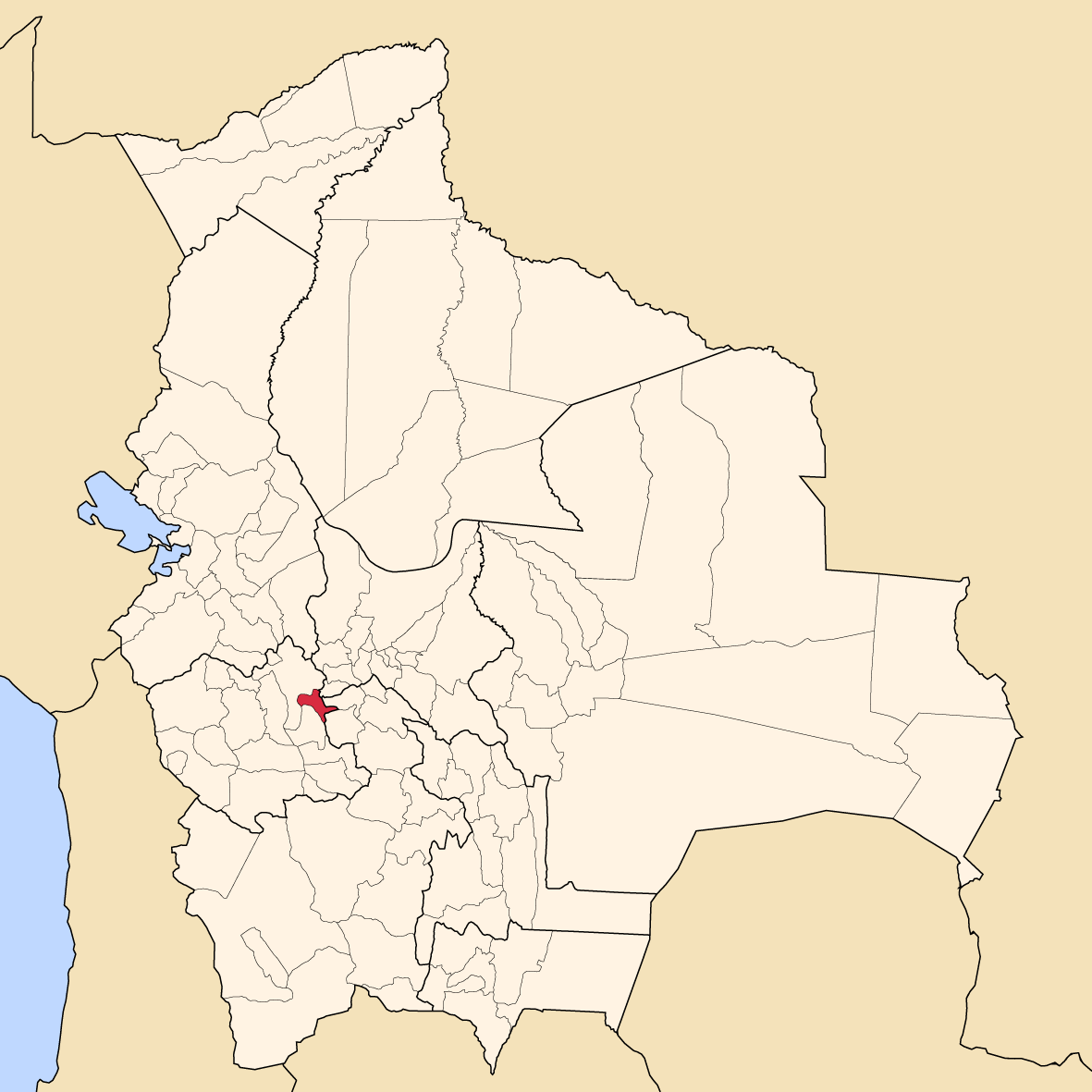
- Location of Pantaleón Dalence Province in Bolivia
- Coordinates: 18°20′S 66°28′W
- Country: Bolivia
- Department: Oruro
- Capital: Huanuni

Area
  - Total: 967 km^{2} (373 sq mi)

Population (2024 census)
  - Total: 26,124
  - Density: 27.0/km^{2} (70.0/sq mi)
  - Ethnicities: Quechua

Languages spoken (2001)
  - Spanish: 93.2%
  - Quechua: 69.8%
  - Aymara: 21.2%

Sectors
- Time zone: UTC-4 (BOT)

Pantaleón Dalence is a province in the eastern parts of the Bolivian Oruro Department. Its seat is Huanuni. The province was named after the jurist Pantaleón Dalence Jiménez.

== Location ==
Pantaleón Dalence province is one of sixteen provinces in the Oruro Department. It is located between 18° 05' and 18° 35' South and between 66° 10' and 66° 45' West.

The province borders Cercado Province in the northwest, Poopó Province in the southwest, Potosí Department in the east, and Cochabamba Department in the northeast.

The province extends over 55 km from north to south, and 65 km from east to west.

== Geography ==
The province lies at the Uru Uru Lake, one of the largest lakes of Bolivia.

The Asanaki mountain range traverses the province. Some of the highest mountains of the province are listed below:

- Ch'iyara Ch'ankha
- Inka Pukara
- Janq'u Qalani
- Muru Qullu
- Ñuñu Qullu
- Wisk'achani

== Population ==
The main language of the province is Spanish, spoken by 93.2%, while 69.8% of the population speak Quechua and 21.2% Aymara (1992).

The population decreased from 24,892 inhabitants (1992 census) to 23,608 (2001 census), a decrease of 5.2%. - 45% of the population are younger than 15 years old (1992).

27.7% of the population have no access to electricity, 87.4% have no sanitary facilities (1992).

21.7% of the population are employed in agriculture, 38.2% in mining, 5.9% in industry, 34.2% in general services (2001).

82.3% of the population are Catholics, 14.3% are Protestants (1992).

== Division ==
The province comprises two municipalities which are further subdivided into cantons.

Section	Municipality	Seat
1st	Huanuni Municipality	Huanuni
2nd	Machacamarca Municipality	Machacamarca
