= Machacamarca, Oruro =

Machacamarca Machaqa Marka
- Town
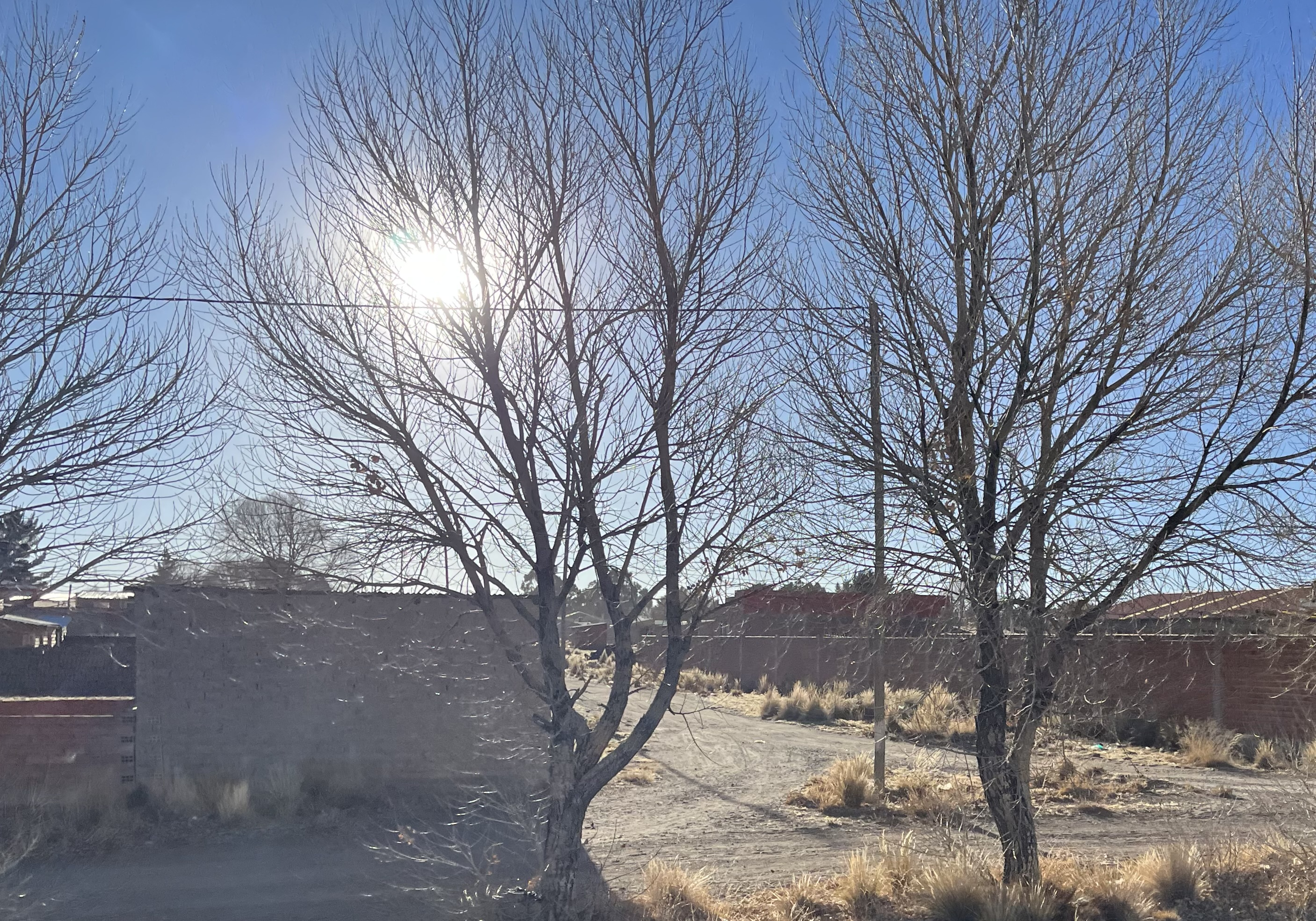

- Location within Bolivia
- Coordinates: 18°10′S 67°1′W
- Country: Bolivia
- Department: Oruro Department
- Province: Pantaléon Dalence Province
- Municipality: Machacamarca Municipality
- Canton: Machacamarca Canton
- Elevation: 12,231 ft (3,728 m)

Population (2001)
  - Total: 2,206
- Time zone: UTC-4 (BOT)

Machacamarca is a small town in the Pantaléon Dalence Province in the Oruro Department in Bolivia. It is the seat of the Machacamarca Municipality and of the Machacamarca Canton. At the time of census 2001 it had a population of 2,206. The town is situated south of Oruro near the south-eastern shore of Lake Uru Uru at the road and railway that lead to Poopó.

Machacamarca is the hispanicized spelling of Aymara: Machaqa Marka, machaqa = new, marka = village, town: So the name means "new village" or "new town".

The people in the Machacamarca Municipality are mainly Quechua (80.7%).

== Places of interest ==
Some of the tourist attractions of Machacamarca are the railway museum, the church in the colonial village of Sora Sora, hot springs, chullpas and ruins.

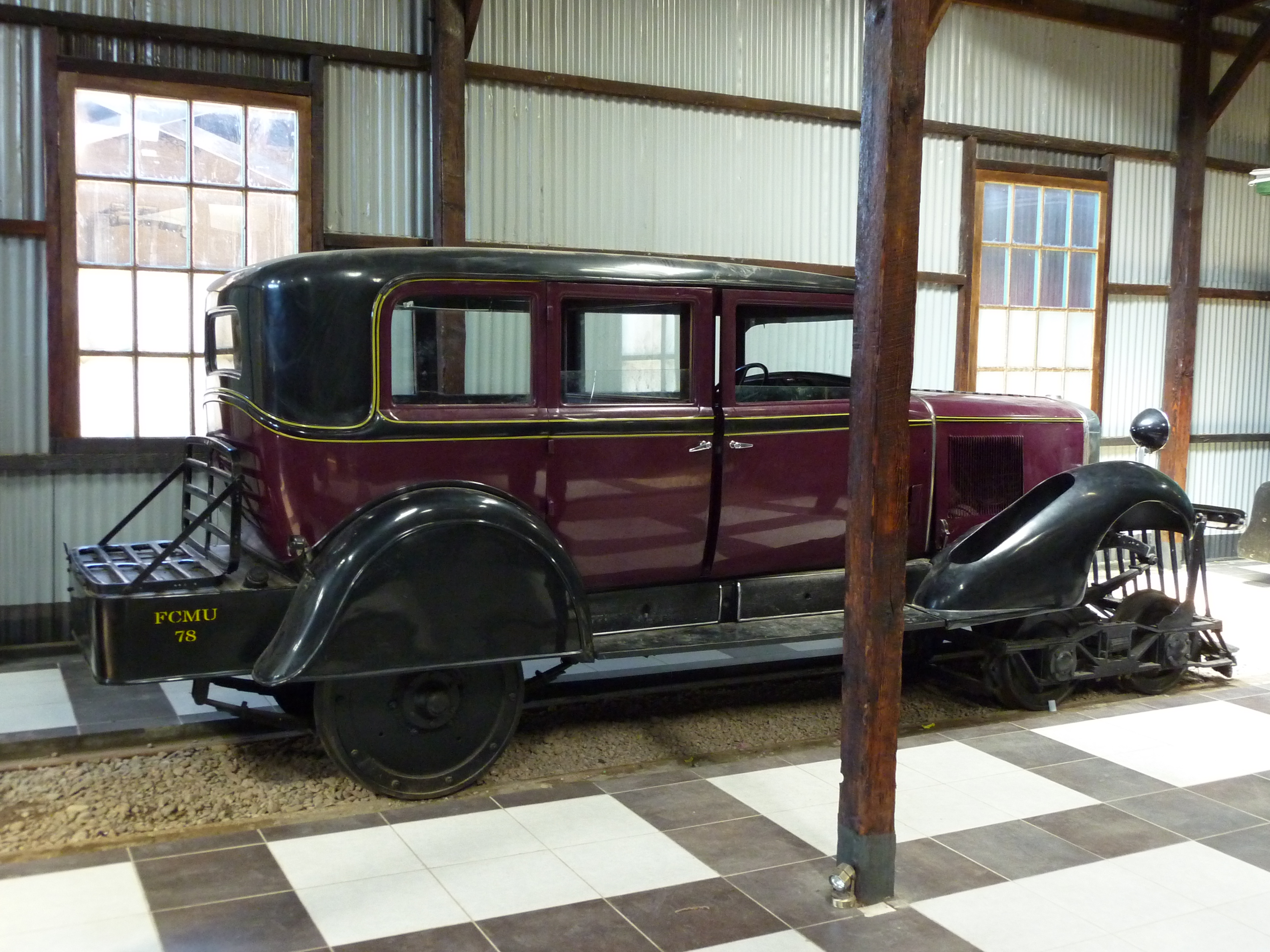
Rail-car in Machacamarca Railway Museum in Bolivia

== See also ==
- Wila Ch'ankha
