= Muru Qullu (Oruro) =

Mountain in Bolivia

- Location within Bolivia

Highest point
- Elevation: 4,504 m (14,777 ft)
- Coordinates: 18°13′22″S 66°49′35″W

Geography
- Location: Bolivia, Oruro Department, Pantaleón Dalence Province
- Parent range: Andes

Muru Qullu (Aymara muru truncated, qullu mountain, "truncated mountain", also spelled Muru Kkollu) is a 4,504-metre-high (14,777 ft) mountain in the Andes of Bolivia. It is situated in the Oruro Department, Pantaleón Dalence Province, Huanuni Municipality. Muru Qullu lies between Ch'iyara Ch'ankha in the northwest and Juch'uy Yaritani in the southeast. The river Jalantaña flows east of Muru Qullu.
