= Ch'iyara Ch'ankha =

Mountain in Bolivia

- Location within Bolivia

Highest point
- Elevation: 4,566 m (14,980 ft)
- Coordinates: 18°12′30″S 66°49′46″W

Geography
- Location: Bolivia, Oruro Department, Pantaleón Dalence Province
- Parent range: Andes

Ch'iyara Ch'ankha (Aymara ch'iyara black, ch'ankha wool cord, "black wool cord", also spelled Chiara Chanca) is a 4,566-metre-high (14,980 ft) mountain in the Andes of Bolivia. It is situated in the Oruro Department, Pantaleón Dalence Province, Huanuni Municipality. Ch'iyara Ch'ankha lies between Janq'u Qalani and Ñuñu Qullu in the northwest and Muru Qullu and Juch'uy Yaritani in the south and southeast. The Jalantaña River flows along its eastern side.
