= Chuqi Nasa =

Mountain in the Andes of Bolivia

- Location within Bolivia

Highest point
- Elevation: 4,640 m (15,220 ft)
- Coordinates: 18°19′27″S 66°53′15″W

Geography
- Location: Bolivia, Oruro Department, Poopó Province
- Parent range: Andes

Chuqi Nasa (Aymara chuqi gold, nasa nose, "gold nose", Hispanicized spellings Choque Nasa, Choquenasa) is a mountain in the Andes of Bolivia, about 4,640-metre (15,220 ft) high. It is located in the Oruro Department, Poopó Province, Poopó Municipality.
