= Ñuñu Qullu (Dalence) =

Mountain in Bolivia

- Location within Bolivia

Highest point
- Elevation: 4,508 m (14,790 ft)
- Coordinates: 18°11′46″S 66°50′53″W

Geography
- Location: Bolivia, Oruro Department, Pantaleón Dalence Province
- Parent range: Andes

Ñuñu Qullu (Aymara ñuñu breast, qullu mountain, "breast mountain", also spelled Nunu Kkollu) is a 4,508-metre-high (14,790 ft) mountain in the Andes of Bolivia. It is situated in the Oruro Department, Pantaleón Dalence Province, Huanuni Municipality. Ñuñu Qullu lies north-west of the mountain Ch'iyara Ch'ankha and near the mountain Janq'u Qalani, south-west of it.

The river Lamama Mayu (Quechua for "stepmother river") originates at the feet of the mountains Ñuñu Qullu and Janq'u Qalani. It flows to the south-west where it meets Huanuni River.
