= Janq'u Qalani (Oruro) =

Mountain in Bolivia

- Location within Bolivia

Highest point
- Elevation: 4,628 m (15,184 ft)
- Coordinates: 18°11′30″S 66°50′27″W

Geography
- Location: Bolivia, Oruro Department, Pantaleón Dalence Province
- Parent range: Andes

Janq'u Qalani (Aymara janq'u white, qala stone, -ni a suffix to indicate ownership, "the one with the white stone", also spelled Jankho Khalani) is a 4,628-metre-high (15,184 ft) mountain in the Andes of Bolivia. It is situated in the Oruro Department, Pantaleón Dalence Province, Huanuni Municipality. The peak southwest of Janq'u Qalani is named Ñuñu Qullu. Ch'iyara Ch'ankha is southeast of Janq'u Qalani.

The river Lamama Mayu (Quechua for "stepmother river") originates at the feet of the mountains Ñuñu Qullu and Janq'u Qalani. It flows to the southwest where it meets Huanuni River.
