= Wallatiri (Poopó) =

Mountain in Bolivia

- Location within Bolivia

Highest point
- Elevation: 4,100 m (13,500 ft)
- Coordinates: 18°17′15″S 66°57′31″W

Geography
- Location: Bolivia, Oruro Department, Poopó Province
- Parent range: Andes

Wallatiri (Aymara wallata snowball, snow lump; Andean goose, -(i)ri a suffix, translated as "abundance of Andean geese" or "habitat of the Andean geese", Hispanicized spelling Huallatiri) is a mountain in the Andes of Bolivia, about 4,100 m (13,500 ft) high. It is situated in the Oruro Department, Poopó Province, Poopó Municipality. Wallatiri lies south of Qala Pirqata.
