= Pukara (Poopó) =

Mountain in Bolivia

- Location within Bolivia

Highest point
- Elevation: 4,106 m (13,471 ft)
- Coordinates: 18°18′15″S 66°57′13″W

Geography
- Location: Bolivia, Oruro Department, Poopó Province
- Parent range: Andes

Pukara (Aymara and Quechua for fortress, Hispanicized spelling Pucara) is a 4,106-metre-high (13,471 ft) mountain in the Andes of Bolivia. It is situated in the Oruro Department, Poopó Province, Poopó Municipality.
