= Plácida Espinoza =

Bolivian politician (born 1948)

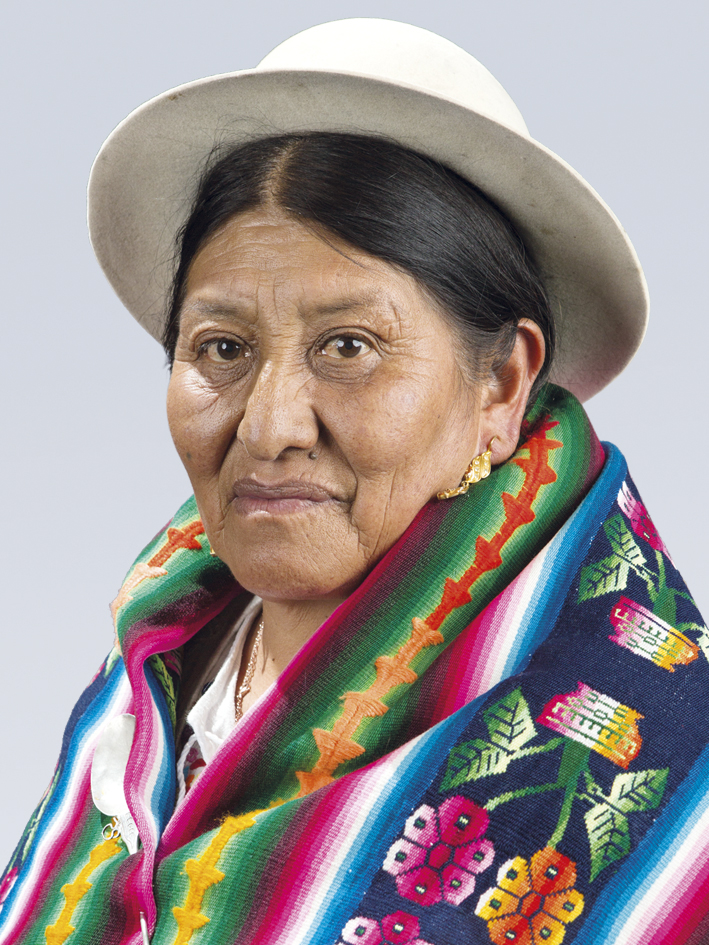
- Official portrait, 2018

Senator for Oruro
- In office 18 January 2015 – 3 November 2020
- Substitute: Marcelino Arancibia
- Preceded by: Mario Choque
- Succeeded by: Vania Rocha

Personal details
- Born: Plácida Espinoza Mamani; 5 October 1948 (age 77) Chachacomani, Oruro, Bolivia
- Party: Movement for Socialism
- Education: Marshal Sucre Normal School
- Occupation: Educator; politician; trade unionist

Plácida Espinoza Mamani (born 5 October 1948) is a Bolivian educator, politician, and trade unionist who served as senator for Oruro from 2015 to 2020.

Born into a rural indigenous community in central Oruro's Carangas Province, Espinoza began her professional career in the field of education, working as a schoolteacher and administrator and serving on her local school board. During this time, she began participating in her region's trade syndicates, holding positions within regular workers' unions before joining the women-specific Bartolina Sisa Federation.

An ethnic Aymara, Espinoza started taking up positions of traditional authority at a time when such posts began regaining their importance within native society. Through her marriage with a local indigenous leader, she assumed titles of local and regional importance, be it in the ayllu, the marka, or the suyu. This, coupled with her union roles, opened the door to politics, given the organic alliance formed between indigenous, peasant, and syndical organizations with the powerful Movement for Socialism. In 2014, Espinoza was elected as a senator for the party.

== Early life and career ==
=== Early life and education ===
Plácida Espinoza was born on 5 October 1948 in Chachacomani, a minor hamlet nestled in the northern Altiplano Plateau of central Oruro. The town, according to Aymara indigenous custom, is situated in the Mallcunaca Ayllu, a subdivision of the Corque Marka in the Jach'a Karangas Suyu—a region roughly corresponding to the borders of Oruro's Carangas Province. (Note: Per indigenous custom, the Aymara realm (Qullasuyu) is divided between suyus (provinces) made up of markas (regions), agglomerations of multiple autonomous ayllus, the collective landholdings of the Aymara.)

Although raised in rural poverty at a time of particular social exclusion for women, Espinoza nonetheless managed to attain an education and prospered academically. She completed her primary schooling and initiated secondary at the Aniceto Arce and José Trifiro schools in the town of Corque before then moving to Oruro, where she attended the Marcos Beltrán Ávila Educational Unit, finally finishing out her secondary studies at the Antofagasta Lyceum. After that, Espinoza moved to Sucre, where she graduated as a teacher from the Marshal Sucre Normal School. In addition, she holds a postgraduate degree in education from the Higher Institute of Rural Education and completed specialization courses in media coverage at the Bolivian Catholic University's rural education affiliate in Tiwanaku.

Returning to Corque, Espinoza worked as a professor at her former primary school, Aniceto Arce, an institute she later came to direct; she would also go on to teach at the Children of the Sun Educational Unit in Oruro. Espinoza's work in education opened paths for a career in civil service; she took jobs as a municipal agent and held a seat on her local school board, later serving as president of the Aymara Educational Council of La Paz in the early 2000s.

=== Unionism and indigenous leadership ===
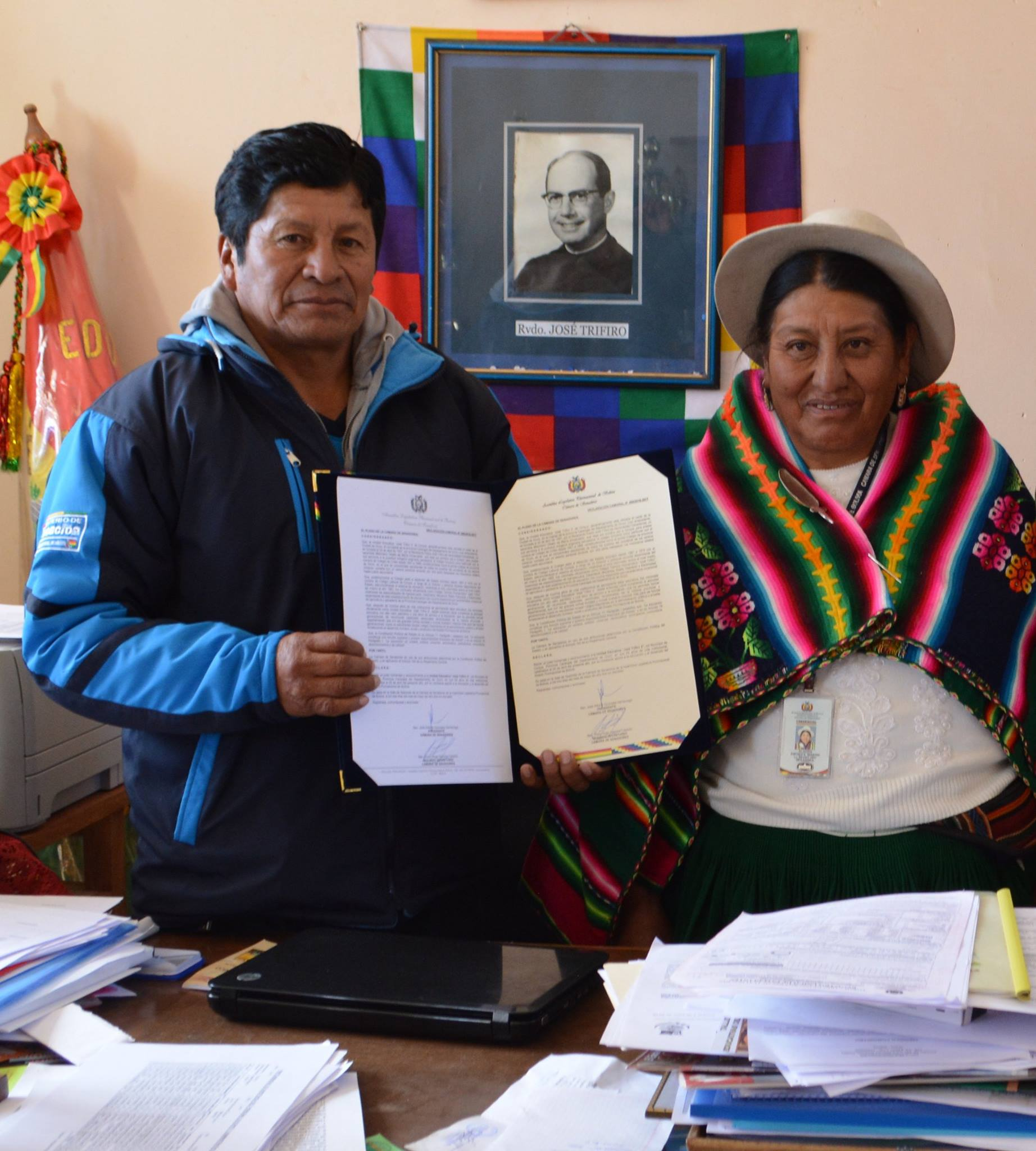
Commemorating the José Trifiro Educational Unit in Corque

Nearing the turn of the century, Espinoza began playing an active role in her region's trade syndicates, which had increasingly begun promoting the entry of women and the peasantry into their ranks. She served as secretary of indigenous peoples within the Unified Syndical Federation of Rural Workers of Oruro from 1992 to 1994, simultaneously holding a seat on the directorate of the Carangas Provincial Workers' Center between 1993 and 1994. Later, she joined the Bartolina Sisa Peasant Women's Federation, where she served as secretary of international relations. In 2010, Espinoza founded her own branch of the organization in the Ravelo Municipality of Chayanta, during which time she held a seat and the vice presidency of the Constituent Assembly charged with drafting the locality's organic charter.

During this time, Espinoza also assumed positions of traditional authority within her Aymara community, reflecting the revaluation of indigenous customs that had begun taking place around this period. By 1984, she had reached the position of assistant corregidor, serving as an aid to the most important political leader within the ayllus. Her highest positions, however, were inherited through her marriage with Luciano Álvarez Galvan, a local traditional leader. Espinoza followed Álvarez's rise through the ranks of Aymara leadership, starting out with the title of mama awatiri of the Mallcunaca Ayllu before much later becoming mama t'alla of the Corque Marka between 2012 and 2013 and, finally, apu mama t'alla of the Jach'a Karangas Suyu from 2013 to 2015—titles denoting the maximum female indigenous authority within each respective polity. (Note: Aymara tradition adheres to the concept of chacha-warmi—joint male-female leadership through marital union. In other words, the authority of the tata mallku is complemented by that of the mama t'alla.)

== Chamber of Senators ==
=== Election ===
By 2014, Espinoza had been active in promoting self-government for Corque through its conversion from a municipality into an indigenous autonomy. The established alliance between indigenous and peasant advocacy groups with the ruling Movement for Socialism (MAS-IPSP) provided an opening for her to contest public office in that year's general election. She was nominated for a seat in the Chamber of Senators, a position she won despite her less advantageous placement at the bottom of the party's electoral list, a product of the MAS's sweep over nearly the entirety of Oruro's parliamentary delegation that cycle.

=== Tenure ===
Sworn in at the beginning of 2015, Espinoza joined other newly inaugurated female legislators in composing the largest caucus of peasant and indigenous women ever elected in Bolivian history. In a legislature noted for its historic number of young people, Espinoza stood out as one of the body's seniormost members, one of just a handful born before the National Revolution of 1952. Her tenure focused mainly on the rights of indigenous peoples, be it through the procurement of their political autonomy, preservation of their cultural artifacts, or promotion of historical traditions and folklore. At the end of her term, Espinoza was not nominated for reelection, reflecting the MAS's general disinterest in developing long political careers for the party's elected legislators in favor of promoting the incorporation of new faces in parliament.

=== Commission assignments ===
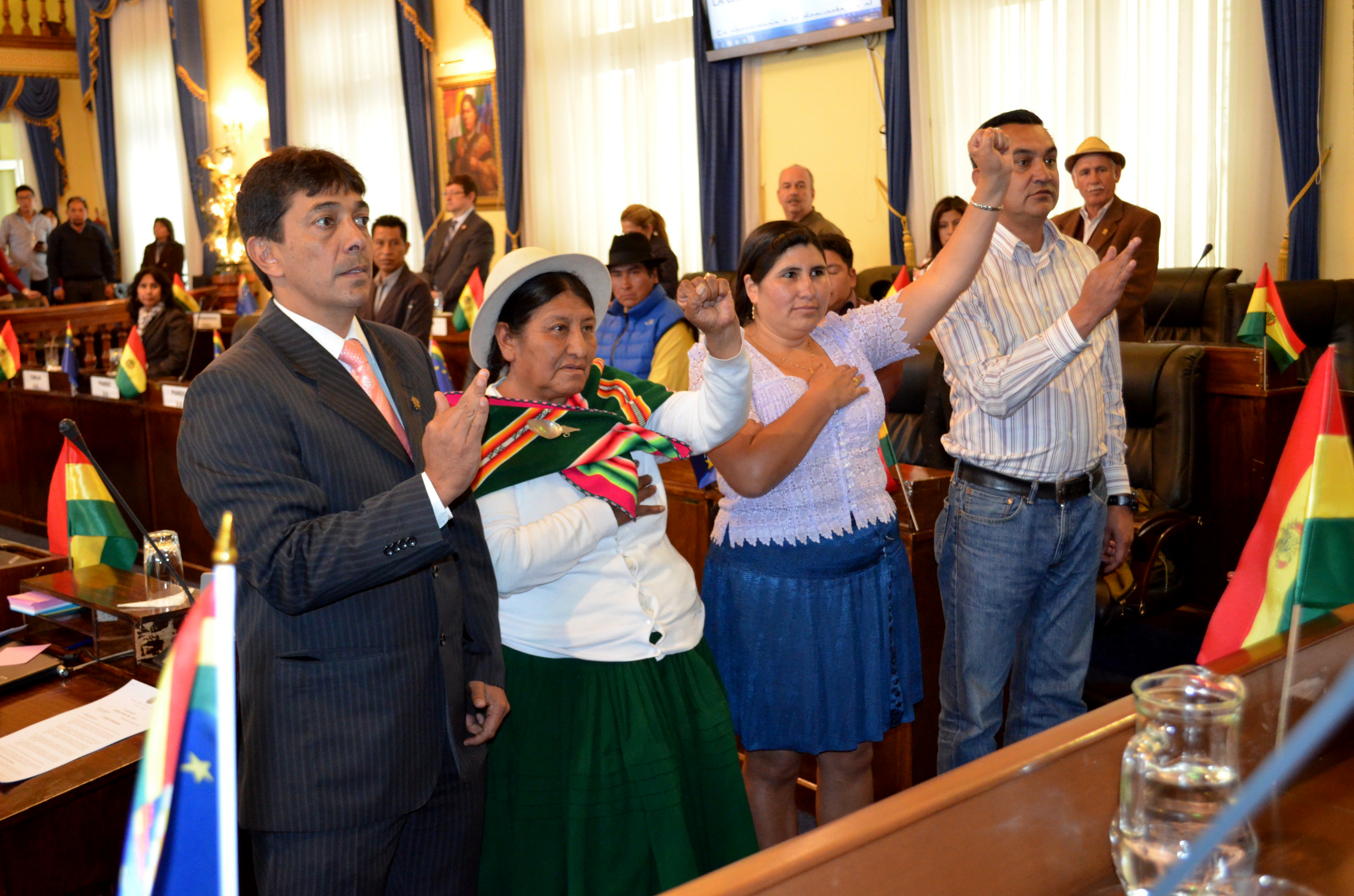
Swearing into the Senate Ethics Commission

- State Security, Armed Forces, and Bolivian Police Commission (President: 2019–2020)
  - State Security and Fight Against Drug Trafficking Committee (Secretary: 2019)
- Territorial Organization of the State and Autonomies Commission
  - Departmental Autonomies Committee (Secretary: 2017–2018)
- Plural Economy, Production, Industry, and Industrialization Commission (President: 2020)
- Rural Native Indigenous Peoples and Nations and Interculturality Commission
  - Rural Native Indigenous Peoples and Nations Committee (Secretary: 2015–2016)
- International Policy Commission
  - International Economic Relations Committee (Secretary: 2018–2019)
- Land and Territory, Natural Resources, and Environment Commission (President: 2016–2017)
- Ethics and Transparency Commission (2016–2017)

== Electoral history ==
Electoral history of Plácida Espinoza
| Year | Office | Party | Votes | | | Result | Ref. |
| Year | Office | Party | Total | % | P. | Result | Ref. |
|---|---|---|---|---|---|---|---|
| 2014 | Senator | Movement for Socialism | 166,360 | 66.42% | 1st | Won | (Note: Presented on an electoral list. The data shown represents the share of the vote the entire party/alliance received in that constituency.) |
Source: Plurinational Electoral Organ | Electoral Atlas

== Publications ==
- Espinoza Mamani, Plácida (2003). Proceso Hstórico de la Educación Boliviana: Interculturalidad, Identidad, Cultura (in Spanish). La Paz: CEA.

Senate of Bolivia
| Preceded by Mario Choque | Senator for Oruro; 2015–2020; Served alongside: Rubén Medinaceli, Lineth Guzmán, Pedro Montes | Succeeded by Vania Rocha |
