= Wisk'achani (Oruro) =

Mountain in Bolivia

- Location within Bolivia

Highest point
- Elevation: 4,602 m (15,098 ft)
- Coordinates: 18°15′47″S 66°49′31″W

Geography
- Location: Bolivia, Oruro Department, Pantaleón Dalence Province
- Parent range: Andes

Wisk'achani (Aymara wisk'acha a rodent, -ni a suffix to indicate ownership, "the one with the viscacha", Hispanicized spelling Viscachani) is a 4,602-metre-high (15,098 ft) mountain in the Andes of Bolivia. It is located in the Oruro Department, Pantaleón Dalence Province, Huanuni Municipality. The mountain lies north-east of Huanuni and south-west of the mountain Juch'uy Yaritani.

== See also ==
- Inka Pukara
