= Wila Ch'ankha =

Mountain in Bolivia

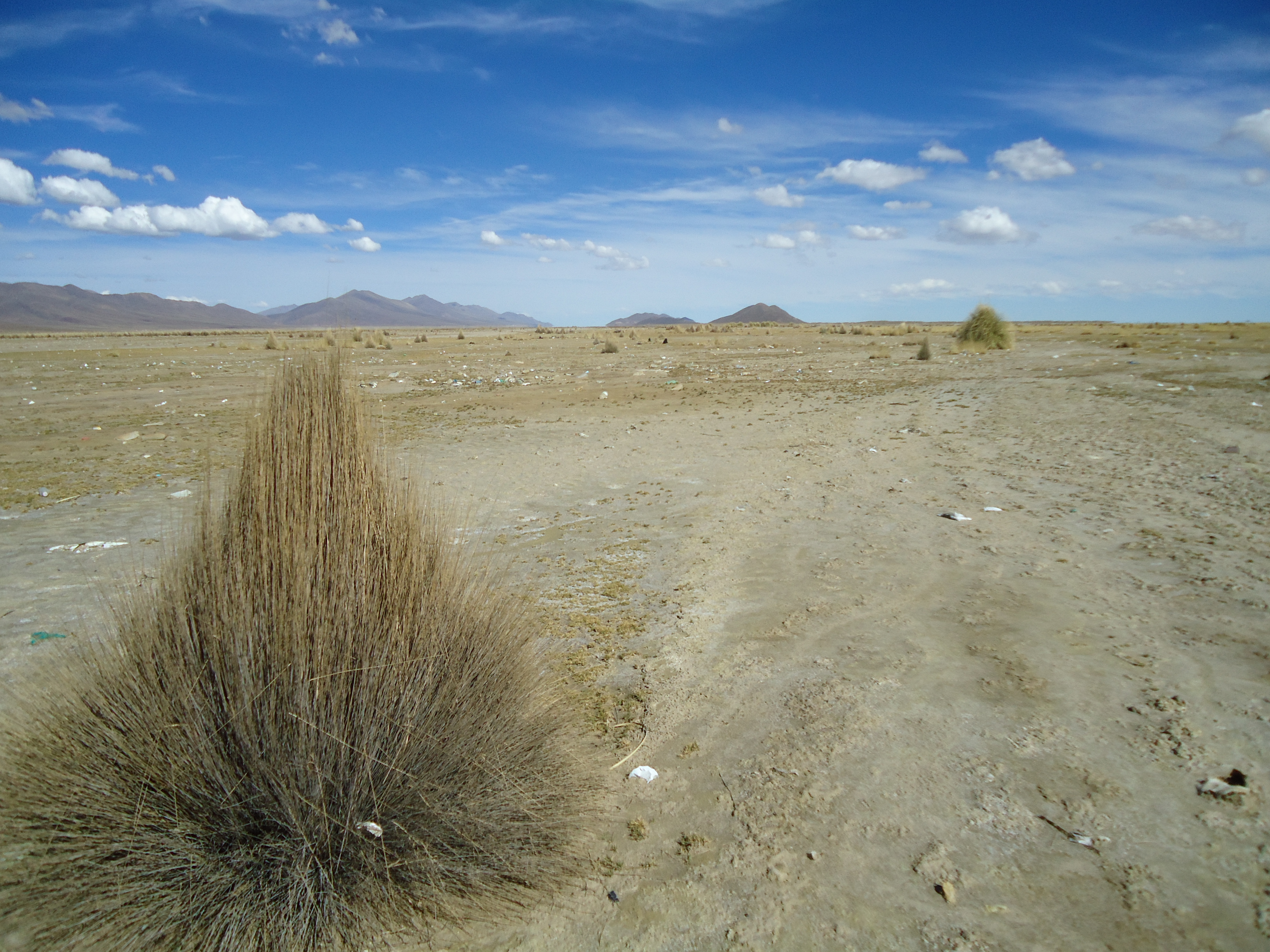
- Asanaki mountain range as seen from Machaqa Marka with Qurimina, Pepitu (4.478 m) and Wila Ch'ankha on the left and Iswaya Island (3.879 m) (lying in the Desaguadero River) in the middle of the picture.

Highest point
- Elevation: 4,701 m (15,423 ft)
- Coordinates: 18°24′S 66°56′W

Geography
- Location within Bolivia
- Location: Bolivia, Oruro Department
- Parent range: Andes

Wila Ch'ankha (Aymara wila red, ch'ankha wool cord, "red cord", Hispanicized spelling Wila Chanca) is a 4,701-metre-high (15,423 ft) mountain located in the Andes in Bolivia. It is situated in the Oruro Department, Poopó Province, Poopó Municipality, Poopó Canton, near the Desaguadero River and northeast of Poopó Lake. The town of Poopó lies at the foot of the mountain, north of it.
