= Inka Pukara (Oruro) =

Mountain in Bolivia

- Location within Bolivia

Highest point
- Elevation: 4,444 m (14,580 ft)
- Coordinates: 18°19′18″S 66°47′18″W

Geography
- Location: Bolivia, Oruro Department, Pantaleón Dalence Province
- Parent range: Andes

Inka Pukara (Aymara Inka Inca, pukara fortress, "Inka fortress", Hispanicized spelling Inca Pucara) is a 4,444-metre-high (14,580 ft) mountain in the Andes of Bolivia. It is located in the Oruro Department, Pantaleón Dalence Province, Huanuni Municipality. Inka Pukara lies southeast of Huanuni. The village of Pukara (Pucara) lies at its feet.
