= Huanuni =

Huanuni Wanuni
- Town
- Location in Bolivia
- Coordinates: 18°17′24″S 66°50′18″W
- Country: Bolivia

Population (2012)
  - Total: 20,336
- Time zone: UTC-4 (BOT)

Huanuni is a town in the department of Oruro, Bolivia.

== Population ==
The population of the town of Huanuni has increased following a decline in the 1970s and 1980s. Population has increased in the last two decades by about 25 percent:

- 1976: 17 292 inhabitants (census)
- 1992: 14 083 inhabitants (Census)
- 2001: 15 106 inhabitants (Census)
- 2010: 17 378 inhabitants
