= Poopó Municipality =

Poopó Municipality, Bolivia
- Municipality
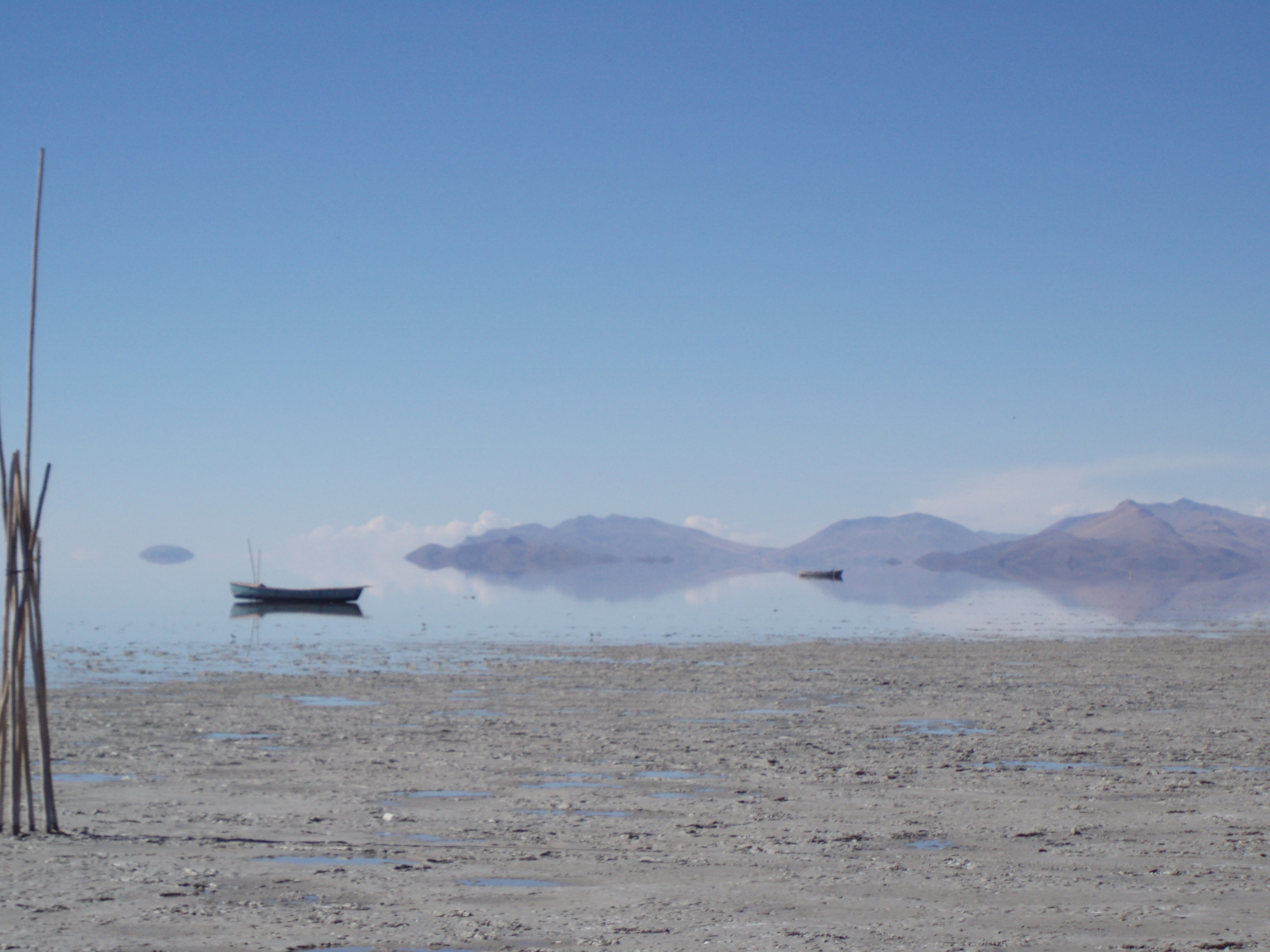
- View of Lake Poopó taken from the south eastern shore near the village of Llapallapani

- Location of the Poopó Municipality within Bolivia
- Coordinates: 18°20′0″S 66°35′0″W
- Country: Bolivia
- Department: Oruro Department
- Province: Poopó Province
- Cantons: 3
- Seat: Poopó

Government
  - Mayor: Nicanor Lopez Choque (2008)
  - President: Jorge Choque Bautista (2008)

Area
  - Total: 269 sq mi (697 km^{2})
- Elevation: 12,100 ft (3,700 m)

Population (2001)
  - Total: 6,163
- Time zone: UTC-4 (BOT)

Poopó Municipality is the first municipal section of the Poopó Province in the Oruro Department, Bolivia. Its capital is Poopó.

== Geography ==
The municipality lies east of the Desaguadero River where it connects Uru Uru Lake and Poopó Lake.

Some of the highest mountains of the municipality are listed below:

- Chuqi Nasa
- Chuwallani
- Ch'alla Wintu
- Ch'ankha
- Ch'api Ch'api
- Kisuri
- Kuntur Ikiña
- Llallawani
- Pä Qullu
- Puka Kancha
- Pukara
- Qachi Qachi
- Qala Pirqata
- Quri Mina
- Tani Tani
- Tanka Qullu
- Taypi Qullu
- Urqu Jipiña
- Wallatiri
- Wanqa Nasa
- Wila Ch'ankha
- Wila Ñiq'i
- Wisk'achani
- Yana Pukara
- Yana Phusa

== Subdivision ==
The municipality is divided into three cantons.

- Coripata Canton
- Poopó Canton
- Venta y Media Canton

== Languages ==
The languages spoken in the Poopó Municipality are mainly Spanish, Quechua and Aymara .

Language	Inhabitants
Quechua	4,439
Aymara	1,105
Guaraní	13
Another native	6
Spanish	5,189
Foreign	27
Only native	733
Native and Spanish	3,769
Only Spanish	1,420
