= Pazña Municipality =

Pazña Municipality Pasña
- Municipality
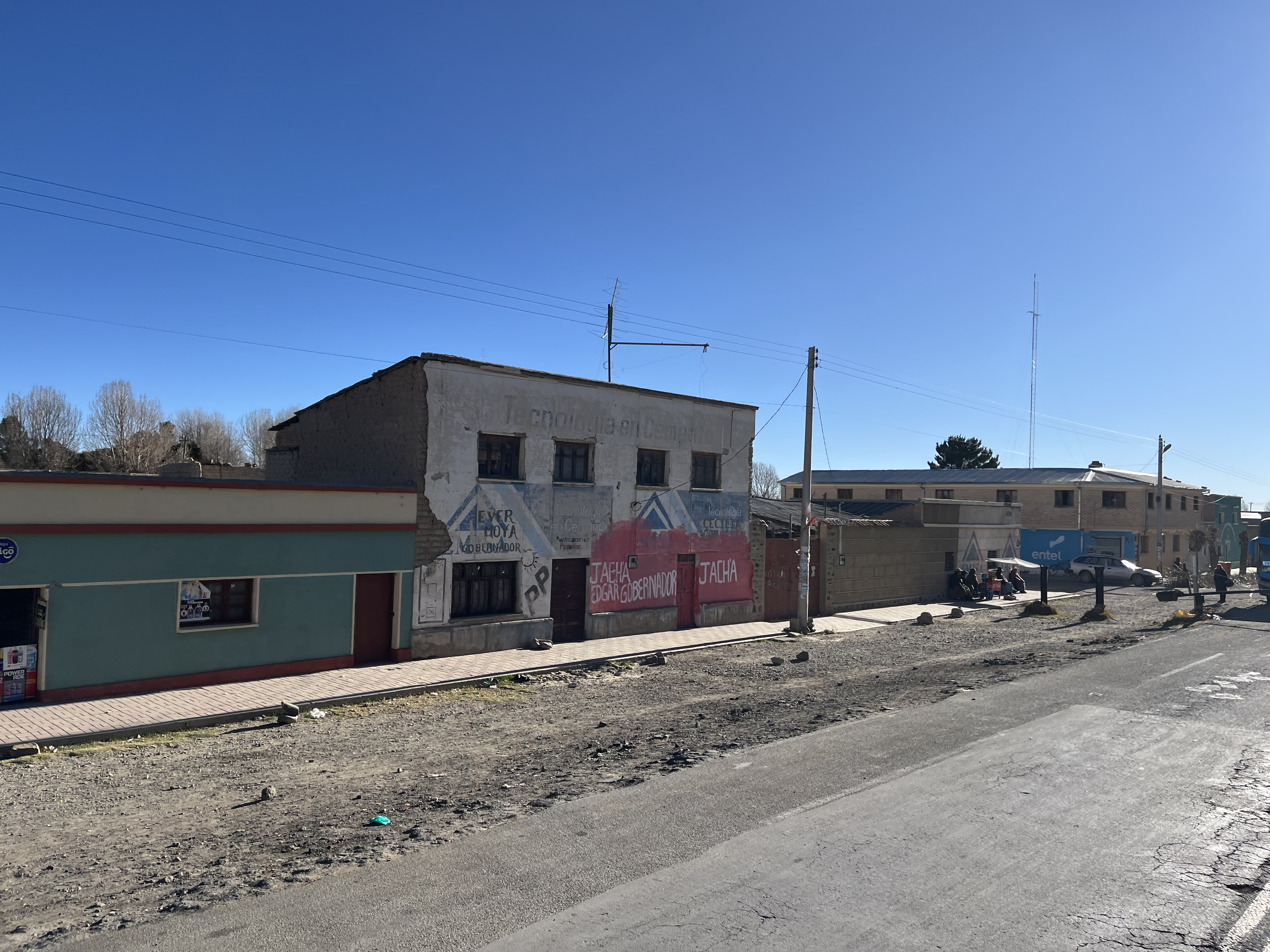

- Location of the Pazña Municipality within Bolivia
- Coordinates: 18°30′S 66°53′W
- Country: Bolivia
- Department: Oruro Department
- Province: Poopó Province
- Cantons: 5: Pazña, Totoral, Peñas, Avicaya, and Urmiri
- Incorporated (vice-canton): 1904
- Incorporated (municipality) -->: 6 January 1961
- Seat: Pazña

Government
  - Mayor (interim): Gualberto Abad Olmos Leaños (2010)
  - Council President: Martin Sabino Quispe Alarcón (2010)

Population (2011)
  - Total: ~7,000
  - Ethnicities: Quechua (Tapacarí and Cóndor Apacheta ayllus) Urus
- Time zone: UTC-4 (BOT)

Pazña Municipality is a municipality of the Poopó Province in the Oruro Department, Bolivia. Its capital is Pazña.

== Government ==
Municipal governments in Bolivia are divided into executive and legislative branches. The Mayor of Pazña is the head of the city government, elected by general election for a term of five years. The Municipal Council is the legislative branch.

The current mayor of Pazña is Gualberto Abad Olmos Leaños of the National Unity Front, who took office in June 2010 following the resignation of Víctor Centeno (of the Movement for Socialism). A new mayor will be selected in a special election expected to be held in 2011.

== Subdivision ==
The municipality used to be divided into five cantons.

- Pazña Canton
- Totoral Canton
- Peñas Canton
- Avicaya Canton
- Urmiri Canton

== Languages ==
The languages spoken in the Pazña Municipality are mainly Quechua, Spanish and Urus.

== Climate ==
Climate data for Pazña, elevation 3,710 m (12,170 ft)
Month	Jan	Feb	Mar	Apr	May	Jun	Jul	Aug	Sep	Oct	Nov	Dec	Year
Mean daily maximum °C (°F)	20.9 (69.6)	19.9 (67.8)	20.5 (68.9)	20.0 (68.0)	17.2 (63.0)	15.4 (59.7)	15.6 (60.1)	17.7 (63.9)	19.6 (67.3)	21.6 (70.9)	22.9 (73.2)	22.1 (71.8)	19.5 (67.0)
Daily mean °C (°F)	12.2 (54.0)	11.8 (53.2)	11.2 (52.2)	9.0 (48.2)	5.2 (41.4)	3.1 (37.6)	3.3 (37.9)	5.5 (41.9)	8.0 (46.4)	9.5 (49.1)	11.4 (52.5)	12.1 (53.8)	8.5 (47.3)
Mean daily minimum °C (°F)	3.5 (38.3)	3.7 (38.7)	2.0 (35.6)	−2.1 (28.2)	−6.8 (19.8)	−9.1 (15.6)	−9.2 (15.4)	−6.8 (19.8)	−3.6 (25.5)	−2.7 (27.1)	−0.2 (31.6)	2.1 (35.8)	−2.4 (27.6)
Average precipitation mm (inches)	121 (4.8)	126 (5.0)	94 (3.7)	17 (0.7)	3 (0.1)	1 (0.0)	2 (0.1)	12 (0.5)	24 (0.9)	21 (0.8)	30 (1.2)	85 (3.3)	536 (21.1)
Source: Plataforma digital única del Estado Peruano
