= Poopó Province =

Poopó
- Province
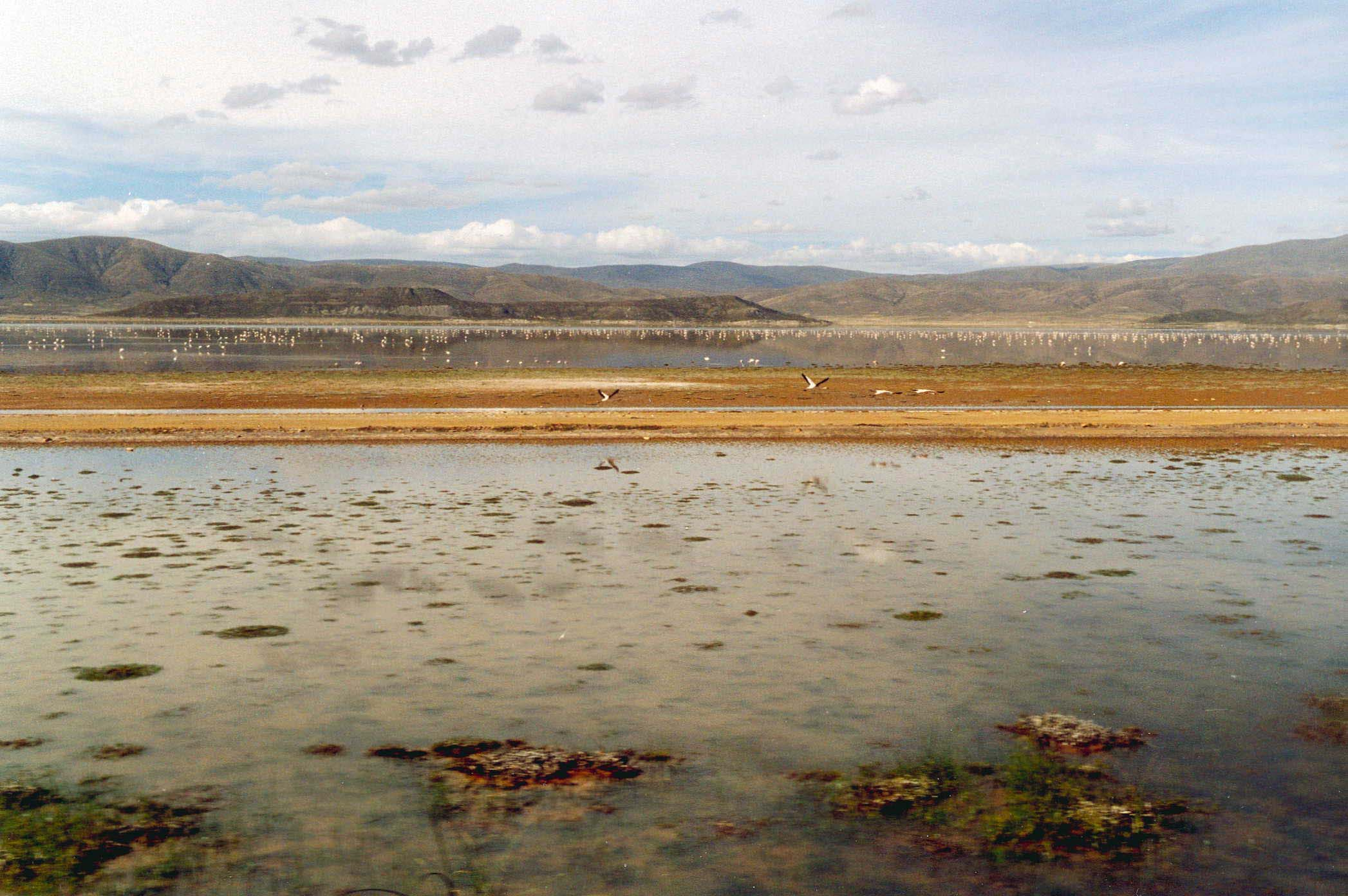
- Poopó Lake with flamingos

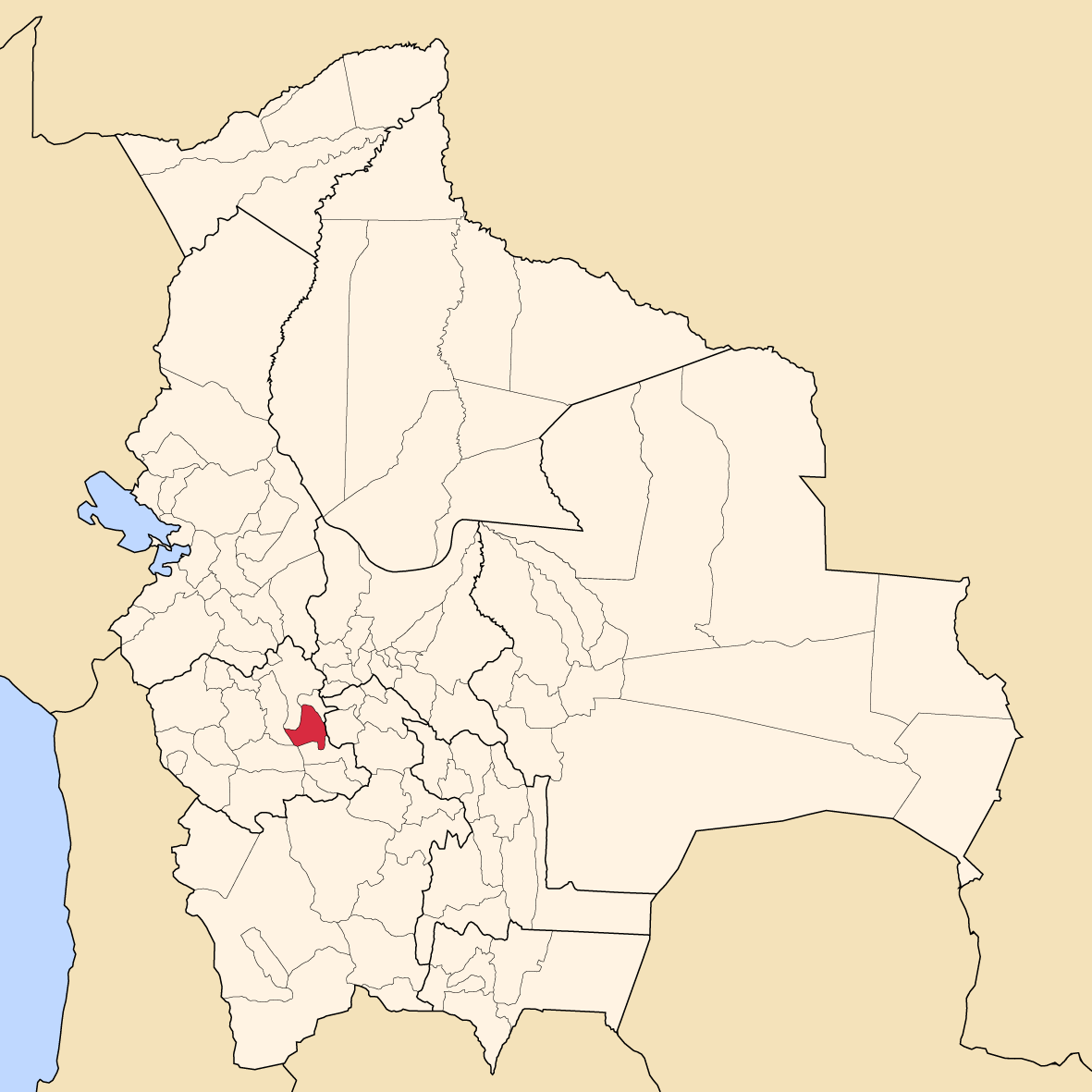
- Location of Poopó Province in Bolivia
- Coordinates: 18°43′S 66°37′W
- Country: Bolivia
- Department: Oruro
- Capital: Poopó

Area
  - Total: 2,034 km^{2} (785 sq mi)

Population (2024 census)
  - Total: 16,986
  - Density: 8.351/km^{2} (21.63/sq mi)
  - Ethnicities: Quechua

Languages spoken
  - Spanish: 86%
  - Quechua: 78%
  - Aymara: 22%

Sectors
- Time zone: UTC-4 (BOT)

Poopó is a province in the eastern parts of the Bolivian department of Oruro. Its seat is Poopó.

== Location ==
Poopó province is one of the sixteen provinces in the Oruro Department. It is located between 18° 15' and 18° 50' South and between 66° 19' and 66° 54' West.

The province borders Pantaléon Dalence Province in the northeast, Cercado Province in the northwest, Saucarí Province in the west, Sud Carangas Province in the southwest, Eduardo Avaroa Province in the south, and Potosí Department in the east.

The province extends over 70 km (43.5 mi) from north to south, and 70 km (43.5 mi) from east to west.

== Geography ==
The province lies east of the Desaguadero River and Poopó Lake.

Some of the highest mountains of the province are listed below:

- Chachakumani
- Chuqi Nasa
- Chuwallani
- Ch'alla Wintu
- Ch'ankha
- Ch'api Ch'api
- Kisuri
- Kuntur Ikiña
- Llallawani
- Pä Qullu
- Puka Kancha
- Pukara
- Qachi Qachi
- Qala Pirqata
- Quri Mina
- Tani Tani
- Tanka Qullu
- Taypi Qullu
- Urqu Jipiña
- Wallatiri
- Wanqa Nasa
- Wila Ch'ankha
- Wila Ñiq'i
- Wisk'achani
- Yana Pukara
- Yana Phusa

== Population ==
The main language of the province is Spanish, spoken by 86%. In addition to Spanish, 78% of the population speak Quechua and 22% Aymara (1992).

The population decreased from 17,437 inhabitants (1992 census) to 14,984 (2001 census), a decrease of 5.2%. - 45.2% of the population are younger than 15 years old (1992).

44% of the population have no access to electricity, 89% have no sanitary facilities (1992).

61% of the population are employed in agriculture, 12% in mining, 5% in industry, 22% in general services (2001).

86% of the population are Catholics, 12% are Protestants (1992).

== Division ==
The province comprises three municipalities which are further subdivided into cantons.

Section	Municipality	Seat
1st	Poopó Municipality	Poopó
2nd	Pazña Municipality	Pazña
3rd	Antequera Municipality	Antequera
