= Wila Qullu =

Wila Qullu (Aymara wila red, blood red, qullu mountain, "red mountain", other spellings Huila Kkollu, Huilacollo, Vila Kkollu, Vilacollo, Wila Collu, Wila Khollu, Wila Kkollu, Wila Kollu, Wila Qollu, Willa Kkollu, Wilacollo, Wilacolo, Wilakhollu, Wilakkollu) may refer to:

== Mountain ==
- Wila Qullu (Bolivia-Chile), in the Llica Municipality, Daniel Campos Province, Potosí Department, Bolivia; Tarapacá Region, Chile
- Wila Qullu (Challapata), southeast of Chunkara Lake in the Challapata Canton, Challapata Municipality, Challapata Province Province, Oruro Department, Bolivia
- Wila Qullu (Chunkara), at Chunkara Lake in the Challapata Canton, Challapata Municipality, Challapata Province Province, Oruro Department, Bolivia
- Wila Qullu (Cochabamba), in the Cochabamba Department, Bolivia
- Wila Qullu (Curahuara de Carangas), in the Curahuara de Carangas Municipality, Sajama Province, Oruro Department, Bolivia
- Wila Qullu (Ingavi), in the Ingavi Province, La Paz Department, Bolivia
- Wila Qullu (Inquisivi), in the Inquisivi Province, La Paz Department, Bolivia
- Wila Qullu (K'ulta), near K'ulta in the Challapata Municipality, Challapata Province Province, Oruro Department, Bolivia
- Wila Qullu (La Paz), in the Murillo Province, La Paz Department, Bolivia
- Wila Qullu (Moquegua-Puno), on the border of the Moquegua Region and the Puno Region, Peru
- Wila Qullu (Pacajes), in the Pacajes Province, La Paz Department, Bolivia
- Wila Qullu (Palca), in the Palca District, Tacna Province, Tacna Region, Peru
- Wila Qullu (Potosí), in the Potosí Department, Bolivia
- Wila Qullu (Tacna), in the Candarave Province, Tacna Region, Peru
- Wila Qullu (Tarata), in the Tarata Province, Tacna Region, Peru
- Wila Qullu (Qutallani), near Qutallani in the Turco Municipality, Sajama Province, Oruro Department, Bolivia
- Wila Qullu (Sabaya), in the Sabaya Municipality, Sabaya Province, Oruro Department, Bolivia
- Wila Qullu (Turco), in the west of the Turco Municipality, Sajama Province, Oruro Department, Bolivia

== Places ==
- Wila Qullu, San José de Kala, in the San José de Kala Canton, Corque Municipality, Carangas Province Province, Oruro Department, Bolivia
- Wila Qullu, Villa Esperanza, in the Villa Esperanza Canton, Corque Municipality, Carangas Province Province, Oruro Department, Bolivia
- Wila Qullu, Challapata, in the Challapata Municipality, Challapata Province Province, Oruro Department, Bolivia
