= Qullpa Jawira (Sebastián Pagador) =

- Etymology: Aymara

Location
- Country: Bolivia
- Region: Oruro Department

Physical characteristics
- Source: Andes
- Mouth: T'ula Pallqa River
  - location: border Challapata Municipality-Santiago de Huari Municipality, Oruro Department

Basin features
- Tributaries
  - right: Ch'iqapa River

Qullpa Jawira (Aymara qullpa saltpeter, jawira river, "saltpeter river", hispanicized spelling Kollpa Jahuira) is a Bolivian river east of Poopó Lake in the Oruro Department, Challapata Province, Challapata Municipality, and in the Santiago de Huari Municipality (which is identical to the Sebastián Pagador Province). It originates near Ch'iyar Jaqhi northeast of Jatun Wila Qullu and flows in a north-eastern direction. South of Wila Qullu it meets the T'ula Pallqa River whose source, the Jach'a Juqhu River, is considered the origin of the Pillku Mayu.

== See also ==
- List of rivers of Bolivia
