= Kachi Mayu =

Kachi Mayu may refer to:

- Kachi Mayu (Chuquisaca)
- Kachi Mayu (Oruro)
