= Jaqhi Qala =

Mountain in Bolivia

- Location within Bolivia

Highest point
- Elevation: 5,000 m (16,000 ft)
- Coordinates: 18°56′42″S 66°40′06″W

Geography
- Location: Bolivia, Oruro Department, Challapata Province
- Parent range: Andes

Jaqhi Qala (Aymara jaqhi precipice, cliff, qala stone, "cliff stone", also spelled Jakke Jala) is a mountain in the Andes of Bolivia which reaches a height of approximately 5,000 m (16,000 ft). It is located in the Oruro Department, at the border of the Challapata Province, Challapata Municipality, and the Sebastián Pagador Province which is identical to the Santiago de Huari Municipality. Jaqhi Qala lies southwest of Phullu Qiri, northwest of Sirk'i and south of Chumpiri (5,048 m (16,562 ft)). The Jach'a Qala River originates at the mountain. It flows to the south.
