= Sebastián Pagador Province =

Sebastián Pagador
- Province
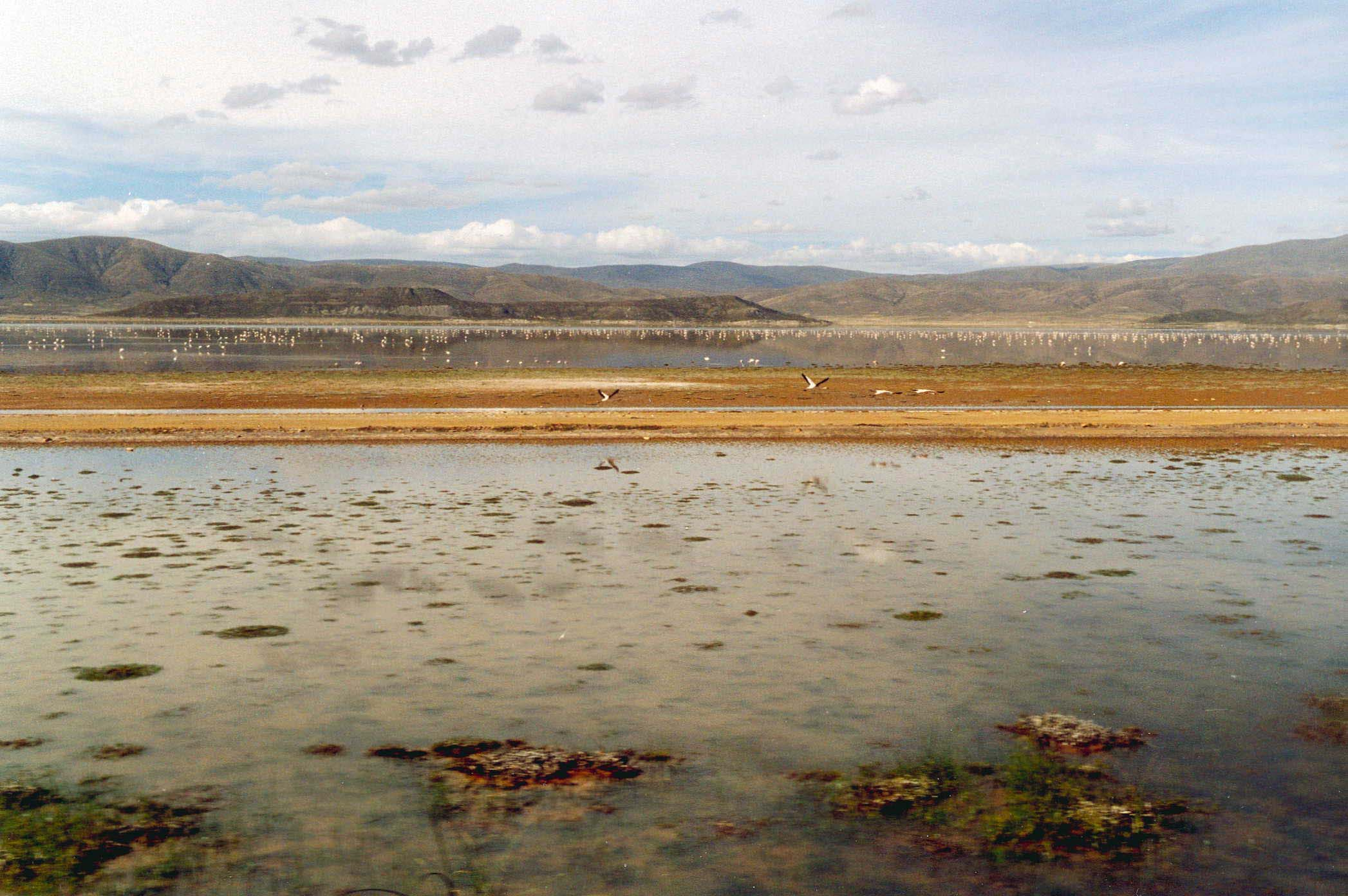
- Poopó Lake, Sebastián Pagador Province

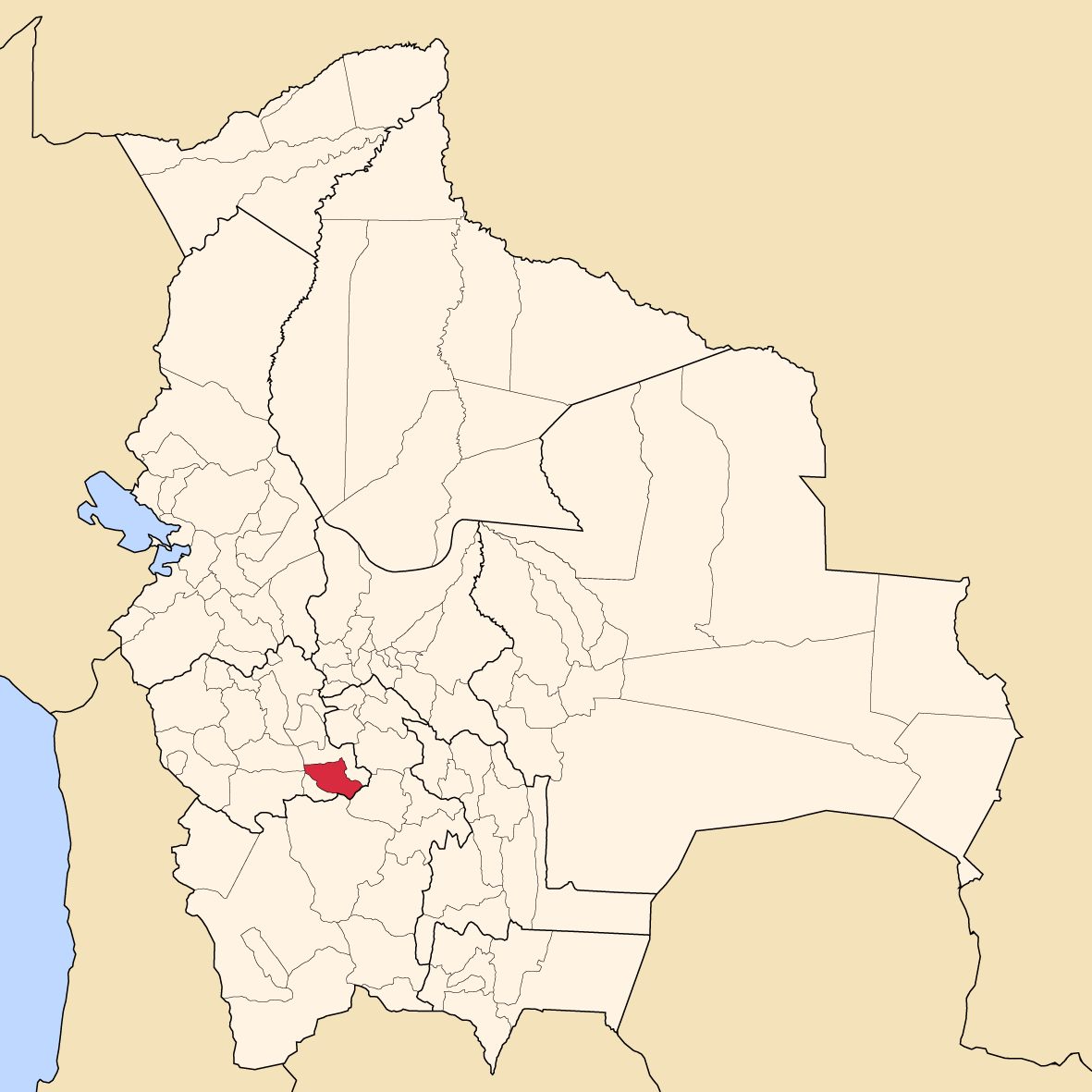
- Location of Sebastián Pagador Province in Bolivia
- Coordinates: 19°13′S 66°13′W
- Country: Bolivia
- Department: Oruro
- Capital: Santiago de Huari

Area
  - Total: 973 km^{2} (376 sq mi)

Population (2024 census)
  - Total: 13,439
  - Density: 13.8/km^{2} (35.8/sq mi)
  - Ethnicities: Aymara Quechua

Languages spoken (2001)
  - Spanish: 84%
  - Aymara: 83%
  - Quechua: 37%

Sectors
- Time zone: UTC-4 (BOT)
- Area code: 591 2
- Catholic: 83%
- Protestant: 14%

Sebastián Pagador is a province in the southeastern parts of the Bolivian department of Oruro. Its seat is Santiago de Huari.

== Location ==
Sebastián Pagador province is one of sixteen provinces in the Oruro Department. It is located between 18° 55' and 19° 30' South and between 65° 49' and 66° 37' West.

It borders the northern part of Eduardo Avaroa Province in the north east and north, Sud Carangas Province and Ladislao Cabrera Province in the north west, the southern part of Eduardo Avaroa Province in the south west, and Potosí Department in the south east.

The province extends over 50 km from North to South, and 100 km from east to west.

== Geography ==
The Asanaki mountain range traverses the province. Some of the highest mountains of the province are Ch'alla Phujru, Ch'iyar Jaqhi, Sirk'i and Wila Sirka at more than 4,900-metre (16,076 ft) above sea level. Other mountains are listed below:

- Chullpa
- Chullpiri
- Jaqhi Qala
- Kuntur Chukuña

== Population ==
The main language of the province is Spanish, spoken by 74%, while 73% of the population speak Aymara and 63% Quechua.

The population increased from 7,712 inhabitants (1992 census) to 10,221 (2001 census), an increase of 32.5%. - 43.6% of the population are younger than 15 years old.

75% of the population have no access to electricity, 95% have no sanitary facilities.

74.1% of the population are employed in agriculture, 0.2% in mining, 7.9% in industry, 17.8% in general services (2001).

84% of the population are Catholics, 14% are Protestants (1992).

== Division ==
The province comprises only one municipality, Santiago de Huari Municipality. It is identical to the province. The province is further subdivided into 11 cantons.

== See also ==
- Kachi Mayu
- Qullpa Jawira
- Warawara Lake
