= Kachi Mayu (Oruro) =

- Etymology: Quechua

Location
- Country: Bolivia
- Region: Oruro Department

Physical characteristics
- Source: Andes
  - location: Condo "C" Canton, Oruro Department
  - coordinates: 19°20′S 66°20′W
  - elevation: 4,600 m (15,100 ft)
- Mouth: Pillku Mayu
  - location: Potosí Department, Urmiri Municipality

Basin features
- Tributaries
  - left: Pupusa Pallqa, Waylla Wint'u, Phaq'u Q'awa
  - right: Castilla Chita, Qullpa Jawira

Kachi Mayu (Quechua kachi salt, mayu river, "salt river", hispanicized spelling Cachi Mayu) is a Bolivian river east of Poopó Lake in the Oruro Department, Challapata Province, Challapata Municipality. Its source, the Jach'a Juqhu River, is considered the origin of the Pillku Mayu.

The Jach'a Juqhu River (Aymara jach'a big, great, juqhu muddy place, "great muddy place", hispanicized Jachcha Jokho) originates in the Sebastián Pagador Province (which is identical to the Santiago de Huari Municipality), Condo "C" Canton at a height of 4,600 m south west of the mountain Wila Qullu. It flows in a northeastern direction. Southwest of the village of T'ula Pallqa the Jach'a Juqhu River meets Pupusa Pallqa River. Now the river successively receives the names T'ula Pallqa, Aguas Calientes and Kachi Mayu. From the point of the confluence with the Ch'illawa River, already in the Potosí Department, Urmiri Municipality, the river gets the name Pillku Mayu.

There is another river of the same name, Kachi Mayu in the Oropeza Province of the Chuquisaca Department, which is a left tributary of the Pillku Mayu.

== See also ==
- Ch'iyar Jaqhi
- List of rivers of Bolivia
