= Wallatiri (disambiguation) =

Guallatiri is a volcano in northern Chile.

Wallatiri (hispanicized spellings Guallatire, Guallatiri, Huallatire, Huallatiri) may also refer to:

- Wallatiri (Challapata), a mountain in the Challapata Province, Oruro Department, Bolivia
- Wallatiri (La Paz), a mountain in the La Paz Department, Bolivia
- Wallatiri (Peru), a mountain in the Tacna Region, Peru
- Wallatiri (Poopó), a mountain in the Poopó Province, Oruro Department, Bolivia
- Guallatire, a locality in Putre, Chile
