= Warawara Lake =

Warawara Lake may refer to:

- Warawara Lake (Cochabamba), Bolivia
- Warawara Lake (Oruro), Bolivia
- Warawara Lake (Potosí), Bolivia
