= Kiwuri =

Kiwuri (Aymara kiwu canine tooth or tusk, -ri a suffix, also spelled Kiburi, Quibure, Quiburi) may refer to:

- Kiwuri (Abaroa), a mountain in the Abaroa Province, Oruro Department, Bolivia
- Kiwuri (Potosí), a mountain in the Potosí Department, Bolivia
- Kiwuri (Totora), a mountain in the Totora Province, Oruro Department, Bolivia
