= Pichaqani (disambiguation) =

Pichaqani (Aymara for "the one with a big needle", also spelled Pichacane, Pichacani) may refer to:

== Bolivia ==
- Pichaqani (Bolivia), a mountain in the Inquisivi Province, La Paz Department, Bolivia
- Pichaqani (Loayza), a mountain in the Loayza Province, La Paz Department, Bolivia
- Pichaqani (Oruro), a mountain in the Challapata Province, Oruro Department, Bolivia
- Pichaqani (Quillacollo-Tapacarí), a mountain on the border of the Quillacollo Province and the Tapacarí Province, Cochabamba Department, Bolivia
- Pichaqani (Sajama), a mountain in the Sajama Province, Oruro Department, Bolivia
- Pichaqani (Vinto), a mountain in the Vinto Municipality, Quillacollo Province, Cochabamba Department, Bolivia

== Peru ==
- Pichaqani (Arequipa), a mountain in the Arequipa Region, Peru
- Pichaqani (Cusco), a mountain in the Cusco Region, Peru
- Pichaqani (Puno), a mountain in the Puno Region, Peru
- Pichacani District, a district in Peru and its seat
