= Waylla Ch'utu =

Mountain in Bolivia

- Location within Bolivia

Highest point
- Elevation: 4,446 m (14,587 ft)
- Coordinates: 18°53′45″S 66°34′16″W

Geography
- Location: Bolivia, Oruro Department, Challapata Province
- Parent range: Andes

Waylla Ch'utu (Aymara waylla Stipa obtusa, a kind of feather grass, ch'utu peak of a mountain, "Stipa obtusa peak", also spelled Huaylla Chutu) is a 4,446-metre-high (14,587 ft) mountain in the Andes of Bolivia. It is located in the Oruro Department, Challapata Province, Challapata Municipality. Waylla Ch'utu lies at the Crucero River, southwest of Llallawa.
