= Santuario de Quillacas =

Coordinates: 19.2331°S 66.9417°W

- Town
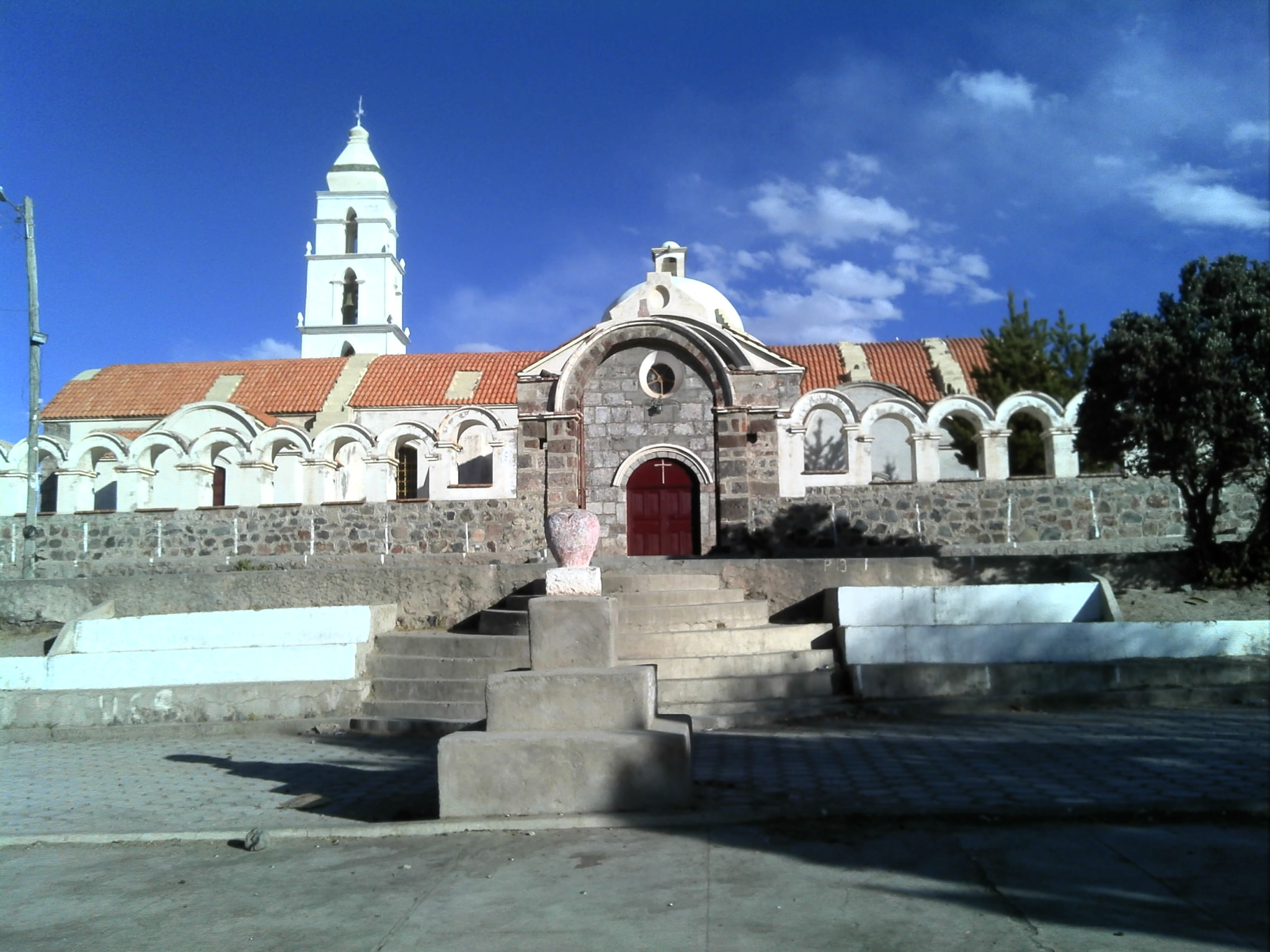
- Interactive map of Santuario de Quillacas
- Country: Bolivia
- Department: Oruro Department
- Province: Eduardo Avaroa Province
- Municipality: Santuario de Quillacas Municipality

Population (2001)
  - Total: 841
- Time zone: UTC-4 (BOT)

Santuario de Quillacas is a small town in the Oruro Department in Bolivia. It is situated south east of Poopó Lake.

== Climate ==
Climate data for Santuario de Quillacas, elevation 3,730 m (12,240 ft), (1995–2012)
Month	Jan	Feb	Mar	Apr	May	Jun	Jul	Aug	Sep	Oct	Nov	Dec	Year
Record high °C (°F)	25.0 (77.0)	25.2 (77.4)	23.8 (74.8)	23.8 (74.8)	22.0 (71.6)	20.1 (68.2)	19.6 (67.3)	20.4 (68.7)	23.6 (74.5)	25.0 (77.0)	25.4 (77.7)	27.2 (81.0)	27.2 (81.0)
Mean daily maximum °C (°F)	21.0 (69.8)	20.4 (68.7)	20.0 (68.0)	19.0 (66.2)	17.1 (62.8)	15.9 (60.6)	16.2 (61.2)	17.4 (63.3)	18.7 (65.7)	20.8 (69.4)	22.2 (72.0)	22.3 (72.1)	19.3 (66.7)
Daily mean °C (°F)	13.1 (55.6)	12.5 (54.5)	11.9 (53.4)	9.8 (49.6)	6.6 (43.9)	4.0 (39.2)	3.9 (39.0)	6.1 (43.0)	7.9 (46.2)	10.5 (50.9)	12.2 (54.0)	13.2 (55.8)	9.3 (48.8)
Mean daily minimum °C (°F)	5.2 (41.4)	4.7 (40.5)	4.0 (39.2)	0.8 (33.4)	−3.9 (25.0)	−7.9 (17.8)	−8.4 (16.9)	−5.1 (22.8)	−2.8 (27.0)	0.1 (32.2)	2.1 (35.8)	4.2 (39.6)	−0.6 (31.0)
Record low °C (°F)	−4.2 (24.4)	−2.4 (27.7)	−5.2 (22.6)	−12.4 (9.7)	−16.4 (2.5)	−19.0 (−2.2)	−18.0 (−0.4)	−18.2 (−0.8)	−19.0 (−2.2)	−14.0 (6.8)	−11.2 (11.8)	−6.4 (20.5)	−19.0 (−2.2)
Average precipitation mm (inches)	85.5 (3.37)	85.5 (3.37)	43.6 (1.72)	14.8 (0.58)	2.3 (0.09)	0.2 (0.01)	0.9 (0.04)	5.0 (0.20)	7.0 (0.28)	5.2 (0.20)	18.3 (0.72)	45.6 (1.80)	313.9 (12.38)
Average precipitation days	12.7	10.2	7.9	2.8	0.3	0.1	0.4	0.9	1.0	1.1	2.9	6.3	46.6
Average relative humidity (%)	68.8	70.0	69.9	70.2	67.0	67.4	63.2	67.4	66.9	69.4	69.5	71.7	68.5
Source: Servicio Nacional de Meteorología e Hidrología de Bolivia

== See also ==
- Kuntur Chukuña
