= Pichaqani (Oruro) =

Mountain in Bolivia

- Location within Bolivia

Highest point
- Elevation: 4,120 m (13,520 ft)
- Coordinates: 18°52′37″S 66°42′48″W

Geography
- Location: Bolivia, Oruro Department, Challapata Province
- Parent range: Andes

Pichaqani (Aymara pichaqa, phichaqa, piqacha a big needle, -ni a suffix, "the one with a big needle", also spelled Pichacani) is a mountain in the Andes of Bolivia which reaches a height of approximately 4,120 m (13,520 ft). It is located in the Oruro Department, Challapata Province, Challapata Municipality. Pichaqani lies at the Berenguela River, southwest of Kuntur Uta.
