= Phullu Qiri =

Mountain in Bolivia

- Location within Bolivia

Highest point
- Elevation: 5,058 m (16,594 ft)
- Coordinates: 18°56′10″S 66°38′05″W

Geography
- Location: Bolivia, Oruro Department, Challapata Province
- Parent range: Andes

Phullu Qiri (Aymara for phullu mantilla, meaning qiri scale, also spelled Follo Kheri) is a 5,058-metre-high (16,594 ft) mountain in the Andes of Bolivia. It is located in the Oruro Department, Challapata Province, Challapata Municipality. Phullu Qiri lies southeast of Chullpa Chullpani. The Qala Jawira ("stone river") originates southwest of the mountain and flows to the Crucero River.
