= Wila Quta (Oruro) =

Mountain in Bolivia

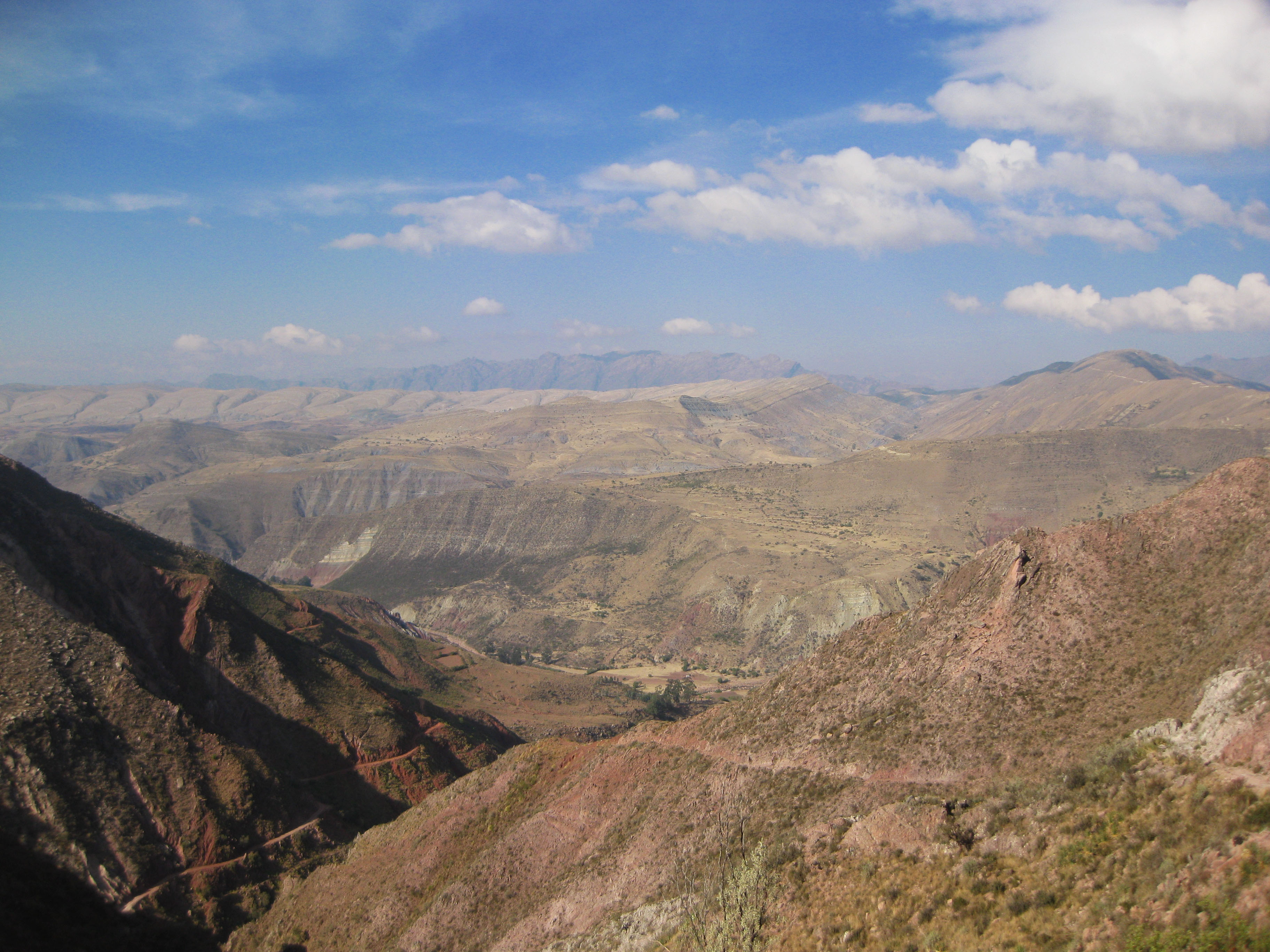
- Cordillera de los Frailes, looking west. Pari Chata is on the right in the background at the Pillku Mayu valley. Wila Quta lies in the distance (to the right, beside Parichata).

Highest point
- Elevation: 5,144 m (16,877 ft)
- Coordinates: 19°04′14″S 66°18′18″W

Geography
- Location within Bolivia
- Location: Bolivia, Oruro Department, Challapata Province
- Parent range: Andes

Wila Quta (Aymara wila blood, blood-red, quta lake, "red lake", Hispanicized spelling Wila Kkota) is a mountain in the Andes in Bolivia reaching up to 5,144 metres (16,877 ft) above sea level. It is located in the Oruro Department, Challapata Province, in the south-east of the Challapata Municipality. Wila Quta is situated south of the Jach'a River and north of Nacional Route 1. It lies next to the mountain Wila Qullu, northwest of it, which reaches the same height.
