= Wallatiri (Challapata) =

Mountain in Bolivia

- Location within Bolivia

Highest point
- Elevation: 4,700 m (15,400 ft)
- Coordinates: 19°24′58″S 66°36′02″W

Geography
- Location: Bolivia, Oruro Department, Challapata Province
- Parent range: Andes

Wallatiri (Aymara wallata snow ball, snow lump; Andean goose, -(i)ri a suffix, translated as "abundance of Andean geese" or "habitat of the Andean geese", hispanicized spelling Huallatiri) is a mountain in the Andes in Bolivia, about 4,700 m (15,400 ft) high. It is located southeast of Poopó Lake in the Oruro Department, Challapata Province, Quillacas Municipality. It lies southwest of Jatun Wila Qullu.
