= Wila Sirka (Oruro) =

Mountain in Bolivia

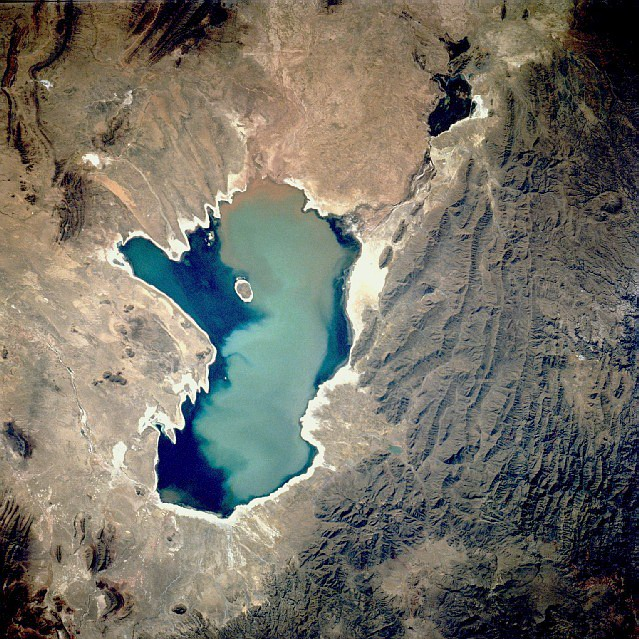
- Poopó Lake from above. Wila Sirka lies in the roundish mountainous complex at its south-eastern end.

Highest point
- Elevation: 4,906 m (16,096 ft)
- Coordinates: 18°57′53″S 66°40′57″W

Geography
- Location within Bolivia
- Location: Bolivia, Oruro Department, Sebastián Pagador Province
- Parent range: Andes

Wila Sirka (Aymara wila blood, red, sirka vein of the body or a mine, "red vein", also spelled Wila Sirca) is a 4,906-metre-high (16,096 ft) mountain in the Andes of Bolivia. It is located in the Oruro Department, Sebastián Pagador Province, which is identical to the Santiago de Huari Municipality. Wila Sirka lies between the mountains Azanaques in the west and Sirk'i in the east.

The river Jach'a Qala ("big stone", also spelled Jachcha Khala) originates north of the mountain. It flows to the south.

== See also ==
- Chullpiri
