= Waylla Q'awa (Oruro) =

Mountain in Bolivia

- Location within Bolivia

Highest point
- Elevation: 4,759 m (15,614 ft)
- Coordinates: 18°51′00″S 66°35′16″W

Geography
- Location: Bolivia, Oruro Department, Challapata Province
- Parent range: Andes

Waylla Q'awa Aymara waylla Stipa obtusa, a kind of feather grass, q'awa little river, ditch, crevice, fissure, gap in the earth, "stipa brook" or "stipa ravine", also spelled Huaylla Khaua) is a 4,759-metre-high (15,614 ft) mountain in the Andes of Bolivia. It is located in the Oruro Department, Challapata Province, Challapata Municipality. The Waylla Q'awa which originates east of the mountain flows along its eastern slope.
