= Wawachani =

Mountain in Bolivia

- Location within Bolivia

Highest point
- Elevation: 5,136 m (16,850 ft)
- Coordinates: 18°57′26″S 66°23′47″W

Geography
- Location: Bolivia, Oruro Department, Challapata Province
- Parent range: Andes

Wawachani (Aymara wawachaña to give birth (animals, women) - ni a suffix, Hispanicized spelling Huahuachani) is a 5,136-metre-high (16,850 ft) mountain in the Andes in Bolivia. It is situated in the Oruro Department, Challapata Province, Challapata Municipality. It lies north-west of the mountains Wichhu Qullu and Wila Qullu and east of Thuru.

The river Jach'a Jawira (Aymara for "big river", Jachcha Jahuira) which later is called Kuntur Nasa ("condor nose", Condor Nasa) after it reaches the mountain of the same name originates near Wawachani. It flows to the south-west.
