= Thuru =

Mountain in Bolivia

Toro
- Location within Bolivia

Highest point
- Elevation: 5,179 m (16,991 ft)
- Coordinates: 18°57′46″S 66°26′11″W

Geography
- Location: Bolivia, Oruro Department, Challapata Province
- Parent range: Andes

Thuru (Aymara for rough, also spelled Toro) is a 5,179-metre-high (16,991 ft) mountain in the Andes in Bolivia. It is located in the Oruro Department, Challapata Province, Challapata Municipality. It lies south-west of the mountain Wawachani and north-west of the mountains Wichhu Qullu and Wila Qullu.

The river Jach'a Jawira (Aymara for "big river", Jachcha Jahuira) which later is called Kuntur Nasa ("condor nose", Condor Nasa) after it reaches the mountain of the same name originates south-east Thuru. It flows to the south-west.
