= Llallawani =

Mountain in Bolivia

- Location within Bolivia

Highest point
- Elevation: 4,822 m (15,820 ft)
- Coordinates: 18°56′06″S 66°42′44″W

Geography
- Location: Bolivia, Oruro Department
- Parent range: Andes

Llallawani (Aymara llallawa a monstrous potato (like two potatoes) or animal, -ni a suffix, "the one with the monstrous pototo", also spelled Llallguani) is a 4,822-metre-high (15,820 ft) mountain in the Andes of Bolivia. It is located in the Oruro Department, Challapata Province, Challapata Municipality.
