= Ch'alla Phujru =

Mountain in Bolivia

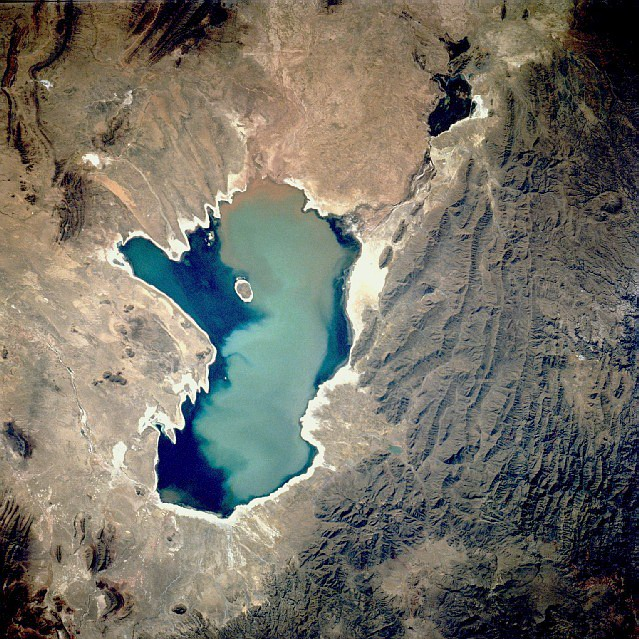
- Poopó Lake from above. Ch'alla Phujru lies in the roundish mountainous complex at its south-eastern end.

Highest point
- Elevation: 4,904 m (16,089 ft)
- Coordinates: 18°59′47″S 66°38′36″W

Geography
- Location within Bolivia
- Location: Bolivia, Oruro Department, Sebastián Pagador Province
- Parent range: Andes

Ch'alla Phujru (Aymara ch'alla sand, phujru a hole or pit in the earth without water, not very deep, "sand hole", also spelled Challa Phujru) is a 4,904-metre-high (16,089 ft) mountain in the Andes of Bolivia east of Poopó Lake. It is located in the Oruro Department, Sebastián Pagador Province, which is identical to the Santiago de Huari Municipality. Ch'alla Phujru lies south-west of the mountain Chullpiri, south of the Anta Qullu valley.
