= Ch'iyar Jaqhi (Pagador) =

Mountain in Bolivia

- Location within Bolivia

Highest point
- Elevation: 4,937 m (16,198 ft)
- Coordinates: 19°17′34″S 66°27′00″W

Geography
- Location: Bolivia, Oruro Department
- Parent range: Andes

Ch'iyar Jaqhi (Aymara ch'iyara black, jaqhi precipice, cliff, "black cliff", Hispanicized spelling Chiar Jakke) is a 4,937-metre-high (16,198 ft) mountain located in the Andes in Bolivia. It is situated in the Oruro Department, Sebastián Pagador Province (Santiago de Huari Municipality), in the south of the Condo "C" Canton. It lies between the mountains Jatun Wila Qullu in the south-west and Wila Qullu in the north-east. One of the nearest mountains is Jach'a Jaqhi (Jachcha Jakke) north-east of it. The river Qullpa Jawira originates near Ch'iyar Jaqhi.
