= Chullpa (Bolivia) =

Mountain in Bolivia

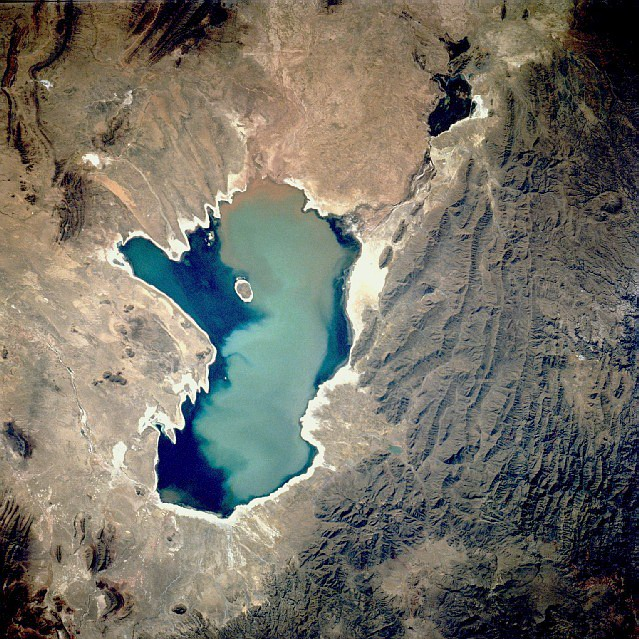
- Poopó Lake from above. Chullpa lies in the mountainous complex at its south-eastern end (lower center).

Highest point
- Elevation: 4,307 m (14,131 ft)
- Coordinates: 19°09′20″S 66°38′14″W

Geography
- Location within Bolivia
- Location: Bolivia, Oruro Department, Sebastián Pagador Province
- Parent range: Andes

Chullpa (Aymara for an ancient funerary building (chullpa)) is a 4,307-metre-high (14,131 ft) mountain in the Andes of Bolivia east of Poopó Lake. It is located in the Oruro Department, Sebastián Pagador Province, which is identical to the Santiago de Huari Municipality. Chullpa lies north-west of the mountain Chullpani and south-east of the mountains Wari Pukyu (Huari Pukio, Huari Pujyo), and Chullpa Qullu (Chullpa Kkollu). It is situated near the Parya River.
