= Wila Willk'i (Oruro) =

Mountain in Bolivia

- Location within Bolivia

Highest point
- Elevation: 4,818 m (15,807 ft)
- Coordinates: 18°53′48″S 66°37′18″W

Geography
- Location: Bolivia, Oruro Department, Challapata Province
- Parent range: Andes

Wila Willk'i (Aymara wila blood, red, willk'i gap, "red gap", also spelled Wila Villque) is a 4,818-metre-high (15,807 ft) mountain in the Andes of Bolivia. It is located in the Oruro Department, Challapata Province, Challapata Municipality. Wila Willk'i lies northeast of Chullpa Chullpani. It is north of the Qala Jawira ("stone river", Hispanicized spelling Khala Jahuira), an affluent of the Crucero River.
