= Millu Jaqhi (Oruro) =

Mountain in Bolivia

- Location within Bolivia

Highest point
- Elevation: 4,076 m (13,373 ft)
- Coordinates: 18°50′18″S 66°40′33″W

Geography
- Location: Bolivia, Oruro Department, Challapata Province
- Parent range: Andes

Millu Jaqhi (Aymara millu a kind of salpeter, jaqhi precipice, cliff, "salpeter cliff", also spelled Millu Jakke) is a 4,076-metre-high (13,373 ft) mountain in the Andes of Bolivia. It is located in the Oruro Department, Challapata Province, Challapata Municipality. Millu Jaqhi lies at the left bank of the Crucero River, west of the village of Ancacato.
