= Kuntur Chukuña (Oruro) =

Mountain in Bolivia

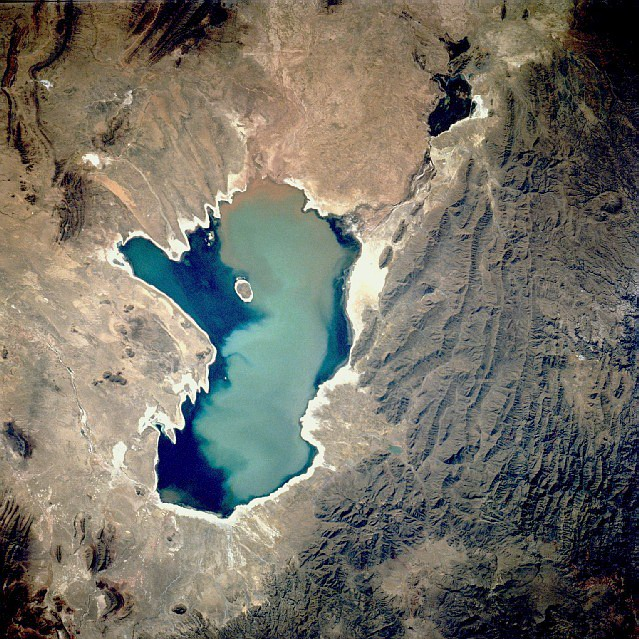
- Poopó Lake from above. Kuntur Chukuña lies in the mountainous complex south-east of it (lower center, left).

Highest point
- Elevation: 4,035 m (13,238 ft)
- Coordinates: 19°15′S 66°43′W

Geography
- Location within Bolivia
- Location: Bolivia; Oruro Department, Sebastián Pagador Province
- Parent range: Andes

Kuntur Chukuña (Aymara kunturi condor, Aymara chukuña to squat, to cower, 'where the condor squats', also spelled Condor Chucuna, Condor Chucuña) is a mountain in the Andes of Bolivia, about 4,035 m (13,238 ft) high. It is situated in the Oruro Department, Sebastián Pagador Province (which is identical to the Santiago de Huari Municipality), Lukumpaya Canton. It lies southeast of Poopó Lake, south of the village of Urmiri and northwest of Jatun Wila Qullu.

== See also ==
- List of mountains in the Andes
