= Chullpiri =

Mountain in Bolivia

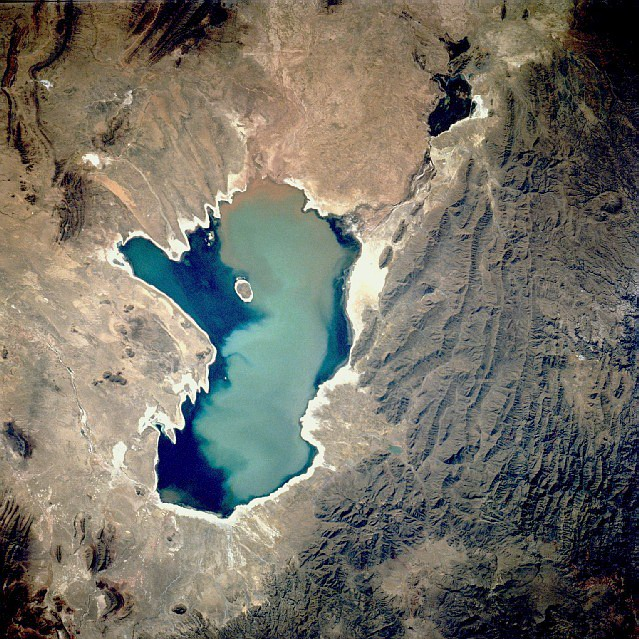
- Poopó Lake from above. Chullpiri lies in the roundish mountainous complex at its south-eastern end.

Highest point
- Elevation: 5,018 m (16,463 ft)
- Coordinates: 18°58′39″S 66°38′24″W

Geography
- Location within Bolivia
- Location: Bolivia, Oruro Department, Sebastián Pagador Province
- Parent range: Andes

Chullpiri (Aymara chullpa an ancient funerary building, -(i)ri a suffix) is a 5,018-metre-high (16,463 ft) mountain in the Andes of Bolivia east of Poopó Lake. It is located in the Oruro Department, Sebastián Pagador Province, which is identical to the Santiago de Huari Municipality. Chullpiri lies southeast of Wila Sirka and Sirk'i and northeast of Ch'alla Phujru. It is situated south of the Anta Qullu valley.
