= Wila Qullu (Chunkara) =

Mountain in Bolivia

- Location within Bolivia

Highest point
- Elevation: 5,060 m (16,600 ft)
- Coordinates: 18°58′19″S 66°22′13″W

Geography
- Location: Bolivia, Oruro Department, Challapata Province
- Parent range: Andes

Wila Qullu (Aymara wila blood, blood-red, qullu mountain, "red mountain", Hispanicized spelling Wila Kollu) is a mountain in the Andes in Bolivia, about 5,060 metres (16,601 ft) high. It is situated in the Oruro Department, Challapata Province, Challapata Municipality, Challapata Canton. Wila Qullu lies south-east of the mountains Thuru and Wawachani and north-west of Wichhu Qullu. It is situated north of Chunkara Lake.

The river Jach'a Jawira (Aymara for "big river", Jachcha Jahuira) which later is called Kuntur Nasa ("condor nose", Condor Nasa) after it reaches the mountain of the same name originates near Wila Qullu. It flows to the south-west.
