= Wila Qullu (Curahuara de Carangas) =

Mountain in Bolivia

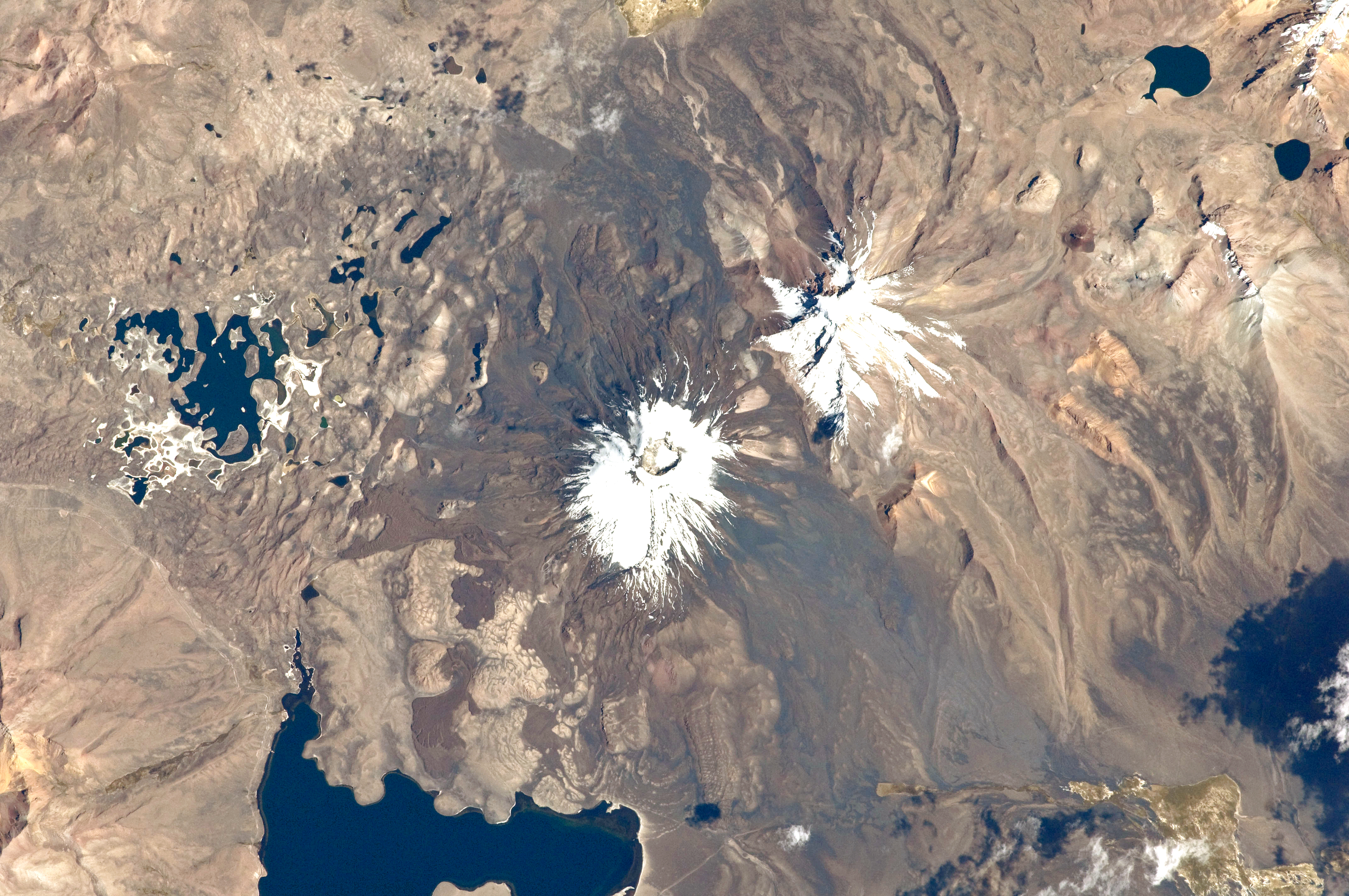
- Satellite image showing the Paya Chata mountains and Wila Qullu north-east of them (with north to the top right corner)

Highest point
- Elevation: 5,140 m (16,860 ft)
- Coordinates: 18°06′46″S 69°05′17″W

Geography
- Location: Bolivia
- Parent range: Andes

Wila Qullu (Aymara wila red, blood, qullu mountain, "red mountain", Hispanicized spelling Wila Kkollu) is a mountain in the Oruro Department in the Andes of Bolivia, about 5,140 metres (16,864 ft) high. Wila Qullu is situated in the Sajama Province, in the west of the Curahuara de Carangas Municipality, west of the extinct Sajama volcano and north-east of the Paya Chata mountains. It lies south-west of the mountain Phaq'u Q'awa.
