= Warawara Lake (Oruro) =

Warawara
- Location within Bolivia Location within South America
- Interactive map of Warawara
- Location: Bolivia; Oruro Department
- Coordinates: 19°24′35″S 66°22′06″W

Warawara (Aymara warawara star, also spelled Wara Wara) is a lake in Bolivia. It is situated in the Oruro Department, Sebastián Pagador Province, which is identical to the Santiago de Huari Municipality. The river Jach'uyu (Aymara for "big corral", Jachuyo) originates at the lake. It flows to the north-east.
