= Jach'a Jaqhi =

Mountain in Bolivia

- Location within Bolivia

Highest point
- Elevation: 4,248 m (13,937 ft)
- Coordinates: 17°59′25″S 68°09′34″W

Geography
- Location: Bolivia, Oruro Department
- Parent range: Andes

Jach'a Jaqhi (Aymara jach'a big, jaqhi precipice, cliff, "big cliff", also spelled Jacha Jakhe, Jachcha Jakke) is a 4,248-metre-high (13,937 ft) mountain in the Andes of Bolivia. It is located in the Oruro Department, San Pedro de Totora Province.
