= Chullpa Chullpani =

Mountain in Bolivia

- Location within Bolivia

Highest point
- Elevation: 4,878 m (16,004 ft)
- Coordinates: 18°55′13″S 66°38′56″W

Geography
- Location: Bolivia, Oruro Department, Challapata Province
- Parent range: Andes

Chullpa Chullpani (Aymara chullpa an ancient funerary building, the reduplication indicates that there is a group or complex of something, -ni a suffix to indicate ownership, "the one with a group of chullpa") is a 4,878-metre-high (16,004 ft) mountain in the Andes of Bolivia. It is located in the Oruro Department, Challapata Province, Challapata Municipality, east of Challapata. Chullpa Chullpani lies southwest of Wila Willk'i. It is situated at the Qala Jawira ("stone river", Hispanicized spelling Khala Jahuira), an affluent of the Crucero River.
