= Llallawa (Oruro) =

Mountain in Bolivia

- Location within Bolivia

Highest point
- Elevation: 4,546 m (14,915 ft)
- Coordinates: 18°53′00″S 66°33′53″W

Geography
- Location: Bolivia, Oruro Department, Challapata Province
- Parent range: Andes

Llallawa (Aymara for a monstrous potato (like two potatoes) or animal, also spelled Llallagua) is a 4,546-metre-high (14,915 ft) mountain in the Andes of Bolivia. It is located in the Oruro Department, Challapata Province, Challapata Municipality.
