= Kachi Mayu (Chuquisaca) =

- Etymology: Quechua

Location
- Country: Bolivia
- Region: Chuquisaca Department

Physical characteristics
- Mouth
  - location: Chuquisaca Department (Yotalla Municipality) / Potosí Department
  - coordinates: 19°18′48″S 65°15′59″W

Kachi Mayu (Quechua kachi salt, mayu river, "salt river", also spelled Cachi) is a Bolivian river in the Chuquisaca Department, Oropeza Province, in the Sucre and Yotalla Municipalities. It is a left tributary of the Pillku Mayu, not to be confused with the Kachi Mayu in the Oruro Department which is the headwater of the Pillku Mayu. The confluence is on the border of the Yotalla Municipality and the Potosí Department, west of the village of Tasapampa.

== See also ==
- List of rivers of Bolivia
