= Wila Qullu (Challapata) =

Mountain in Bolivia

- Location within Bolivia

Highest point
- Elevation: 5,125 m (16,814 ft)
- Coordinates: 19°00′31″S 66°21′38″W

Geography
- Location: Bolivia, Oruro Department, Challapata Province
- Parent range: Andes

Wila Qullu (Aymara wila blood, blood-red, qullu mountain, "red mountain", Hispanicized spelling Wila Kkollu) is a 5,125-metre-high (16,814 ft) mountain in the Andes in Bolivia. It is located in the Oruro Department, Challapata Province, Challapata Municipality, Challapata Canton. Wila Qullu is situated south-east of Chunkara Lake.
