= Sirk'i (Oruro) =

Mountain in Bolivia

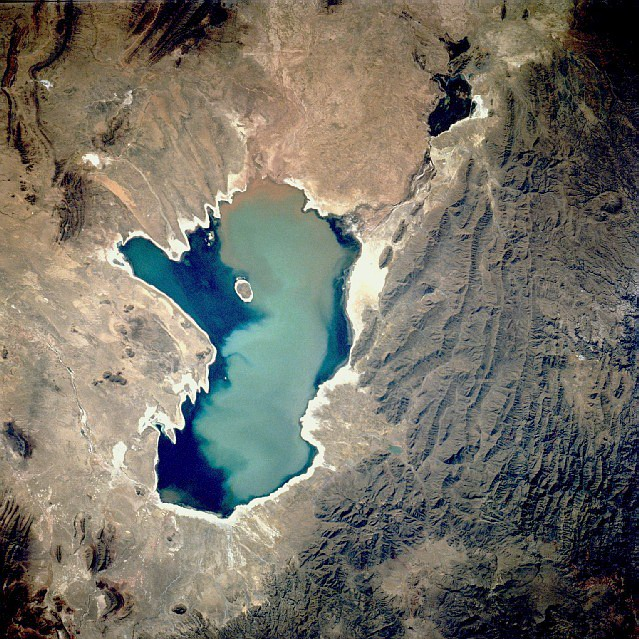
- Poopó Lake from above. Sirk'i lies in the roundish mountainous complex at its south-eastern end.

Highest point
- Elevation: 4,962 m (16,280 ft)
- Coordinates: 18°57′57″S 66°39′38″W

Geography
- Location within Bolivia
- Location: Bolivia, Oruro Department, Sebastián Pagador Province
- Parent range: Andes

Sirk'i (Aymara for wart, also spelled Serkhe) is a 4,962-metre-high (16,280 ft) mountain in the Andes of Bolivia east of Poopó Lake. It is located in the Oruro Department, Sebastián Pagador Province, which is identical to the Santiago de Huari Municipality. Sirk'i lies northwest of Chullpiri and east of Wila Sirka.

The Jach'a Qala River ("big stone", also spelled Jachcha Khala) originates northwest of the mountain. It flows to the south.

== See also ==
- Chullpiri
