= Kiwuri (Abaroa) =

Mountain in the Andes of Bolivia

- Location within Bolivia

Highest point
- Elevation: 4,540 m (14,900 ft)
- Coordinates: 18°51′39″S 66°32′43″W

Geography
- Location: Bolivia, Oruro Department, Eduardo Abaroa Province
- Parent range: Andes

Kiwuri (Aymara kiwu canine tooth or tusk, -ri a suffix, also spelled Quiburi) is a mountain in the Andes of Bolivia which reaches a height of approximately 4,540 m (14,900 ft). It is located in the Oruro Department, Eduardo Abaroa Province, Challapata Municipality. The Waylla Q'awa which originates northeast of the mountain flows along its northern slope.
