= Santiago de Huari =

Coordinates: 19.0133°S 66.7769°W

- Town
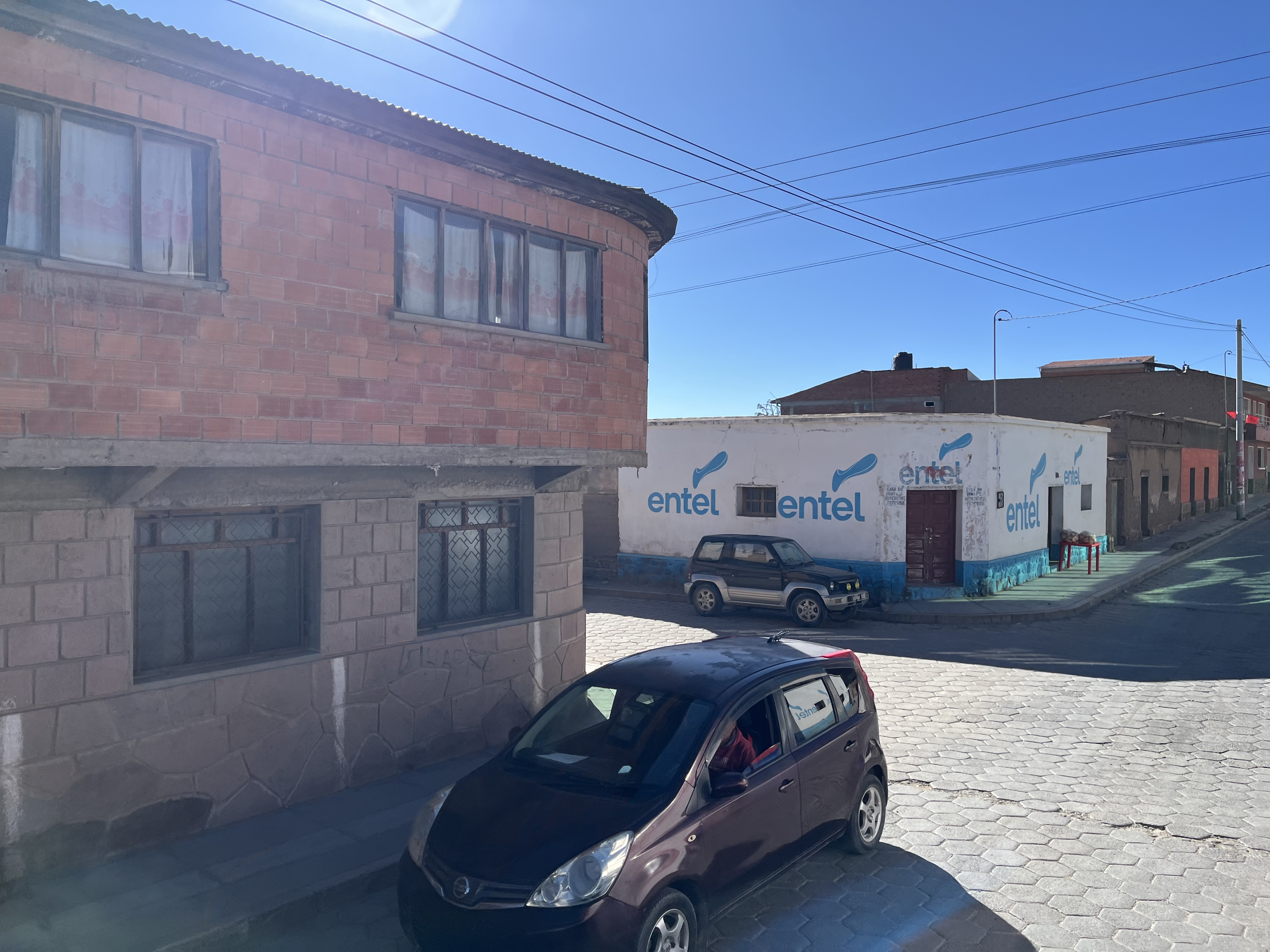
- Interactive map of Santiago de Huari
- Country: Bolivia
- Time zone: UTC-4 (BOT)

Santiago de Huari is a small town in Bolivia.
