= Kuntur Uta =

Mountain in Bolivia

- Location within Bolivia

Highest point
- Elevation: 4,328 m (14,199 ft)
- Coordinates: 18°50′53″S 66°41′48″W

Geography
- Location: Bolivia, Oruro Department, Challapata Province
- Parent range: Andes

Kuntur Uta (Aymara kunturi condor, uta house, "condor house", also spelled Condor Uta) is a 4,328-metre-high (14,199 ft) mountain in the Andes of Bolivia. It is located in the Oruro Department, Challapata Province, Challapata Municipality. Kuntur Uta lies at the Berenguela River, west of the village of Ancacato.
