= Eduardo Abaroa Province =

Eduardo Abaroa / Challapata
- Province
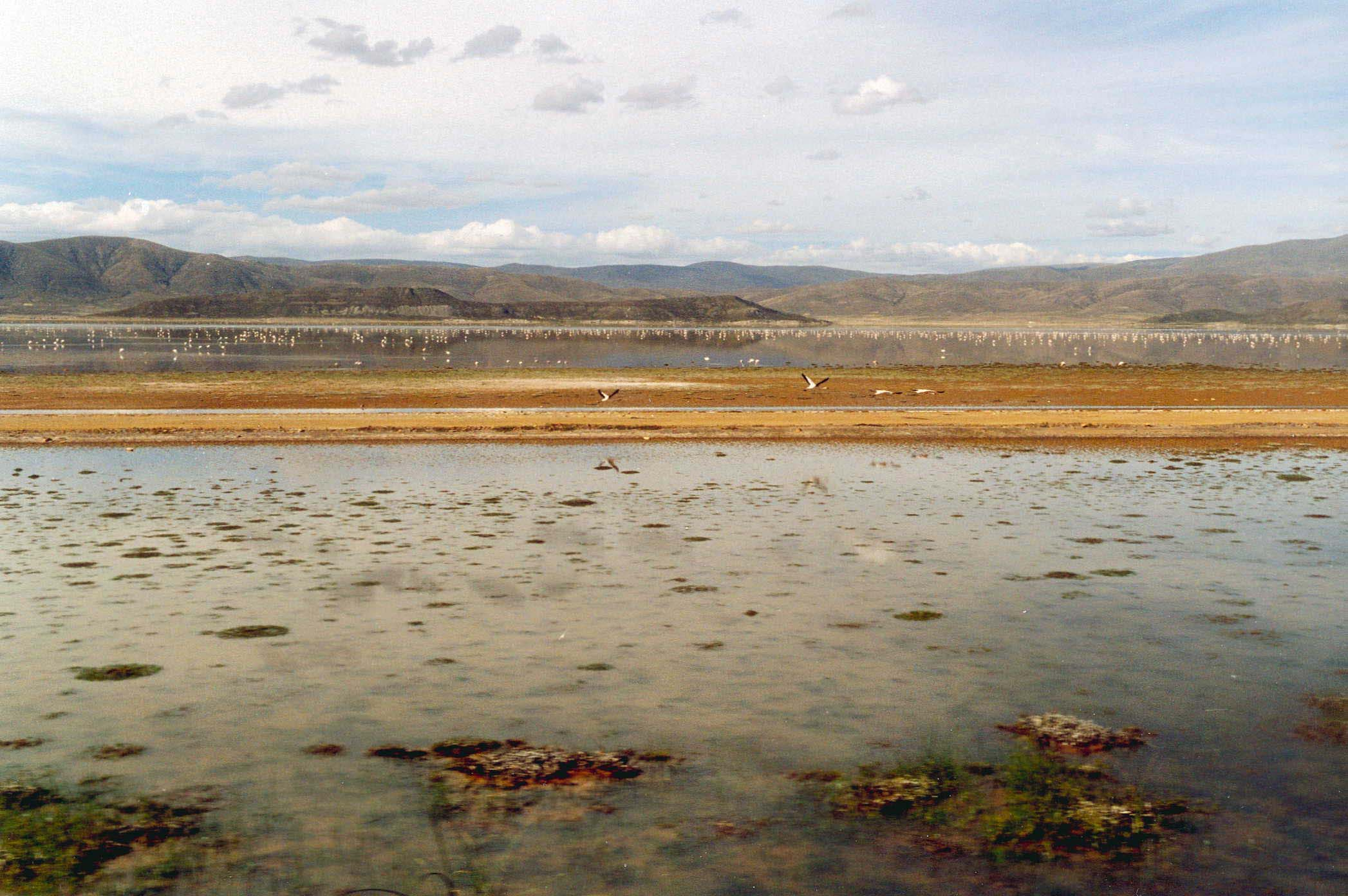
- Poopó Lake, Eduardo Abaroa Province

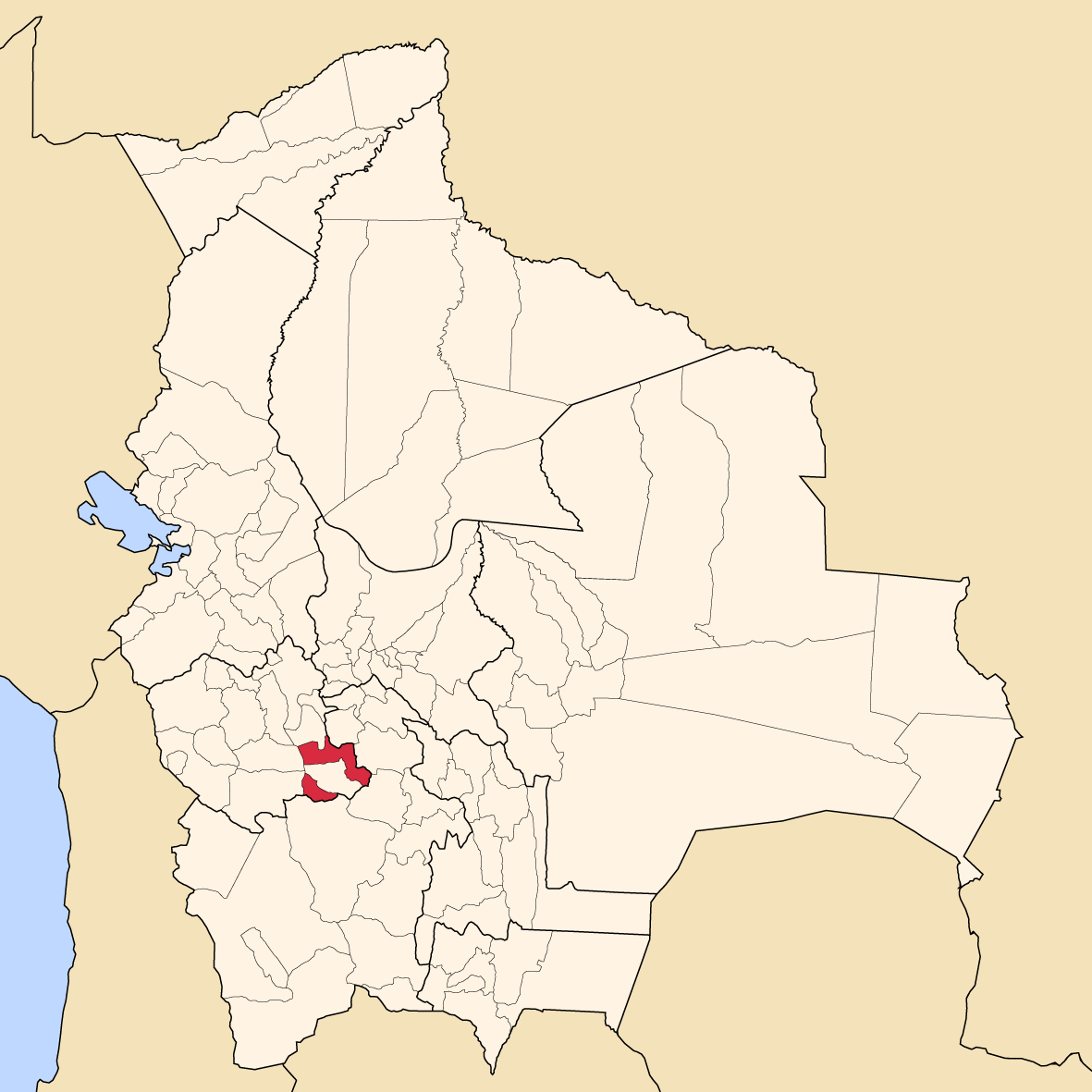
- Location of Eduardo Abaroa Province in Bolivia
- Coordinates: 19°04′S 66°12′W
- Country: Bolivia
- Department: Oruro
- Capital: Challapata

Area
  - Total: 3,738 km^{2} (1,443 sq mi)

Population (2024 census)
  - Total: 40,444
  - Density: 10.82/km^{2} (28.02/sq mi)
  - Ethnicities: Quechua

Languages spoken (2001)
  - Spanish: 78.3%
  - Quechua: 71.9%
  - Aymara: 23.0%

Sectors
- Time zone: UTC-4 (BOT)

Eduardo Abaroa, also Eduardo Avaroa, or Challapata is a province in the southeastern parts of the Bolivian department of Oruro. Its seat is Challapata. The province was named after Colonel Eduardo Abaroa, Bolivia's hero of the War of the Pacific.

== Location ==
Eduardo Abaroa province is one of sixteen provinces in the Oruro Department. It is located between 18° 39' and 19° 30' South and between 65° 42' and 66° 42' West.

The province borders Poopó Province in the northwest, Sud Carangas Province and Ladislao Cabrera Province in the west, and Potosí Department in the south and east. Furthermore, Sebastián Pagador Province is embedded between the two municipios of Eduardo Abaroa province.

The province extends over 90 km from north to south, and 100 km from east to west.

== Geography ==
The province lies at Poopó Lake, one of the largest lakes of Bolivia.

One of the highest peaks of the province is Jatun Wila Qullu at 5,214 m (17,106 ft). Other mountains are listed below:

- Apachita
- Chullpa Chullpani
- Churi Churi
- Janq'u Apachita
- Jaqhi Qala
- Kiwuri
- Kuntur Nasa
- Kuntur Uta
- Kunturiri
- Llallawa
- Llallawani
- Millu Jaqhi
- Pata Pata
- Pichaqani
- Phullu Qiri
- Sirpu
- Thuru
- Wallatiri
- Wawachani
- Waylla Ch'utu
- Waylla Q'awa
- Wila Qullu (Challapata)
- Wila Qullu (Chunkara)
- Wila Qullu (K'ulta)
- Wila Quta
- Wila Salla
- Wila Wilani
- Wila Willk'i
- Wiluyu

== Population ==
The main language spoken in the province is Spanish, spoken by 78.3%, while 71.9% of the population speak Quechua and 23.0% Aymara.

The population increased from 23,147 inhabitants (1992 census) to 27,675 (2001 census), an increase of 19.6%. - 44.1% of the population are younger than 15 years old.

82% of the population have no access to electricity, 94% have no sanitary facilities.

68.9% of the population are employed in agriculture, 0.5% in mining, 6.9% in industry, 23.7% in general services (2001).

86.6% of the population are Catholics, 11.9% are Protestants (1992).

== Division ==
The province comprises two municipalities which are further subdivided into cantons.

Section	Municipality	Seat
1st	Challapata Municipality	Challapata
2nd	Santuario de Quillacas Municipality	Santuario de Quillacas
