= Jatun Wila Qullu =

Mountain in Bolivia

- Location within Bolivia

Highest point
- Elevation: 5,214 m (17,106 ft)
- Coordinates: 19°24′7″S 66°34′35″W

Geography
- Location: Bolivia, Oruro Department, Challapata Province
- Parent range: Andes

Jatun Wila Qullu (Quechua jatun, hatun big, great, Aymara wila red or blood, qullu mountain, "great red mountain", hispanicized spelling Jatun Wila Kkollu, Jatun Willa Kollu) is a mountain in the Andes in Bolivia, about 5,214 m (17,106 ft) high. It is located south east of Poopó Lake in the Oruro Department, Challapata Province, Quillacas Municipality, Soraga Canton, east of Sevaruyo and near the border to the Potosí Department.

== See also ==
- Ch'iyar Jaqhi
- Kuntur Nasa
- Wila Qullu
- List of mountains in the Andes
