= Wila Qullu (K'ulta) =

Mountain in Bolivia

- Location within Bolivia

Highest point
- Elevation: 5,144 m (16,877 ft)
- Coordinates: 19°03′54″S 66°19′20″W

Geography
- Location: Bolivia, Oruro Department, Challapata Province
- Parent range: Andes

Wila Qullu (Aymara wila blood, blood-red, qullu mountain, "red mountain", hispanicized spelling Wila Kkollu, Wila Kollu) is a mountain in the Andes in Bolivia, about 5,144 metres (16,877 ft) high. It is located in the Oruro Department, Challapata Province, Challapata Municipality. Wila Qullu is situated south of Jach'a River and north of Nacional Route 1. It lies north-west of the mountain Wila Quta which reaches the same height.

The Jach'a Juqhu River which is considered to be the origin of the Pillku Mayu flows along the southern slopes of the mountain.

== See also ==
- Ch'iyar Jaqhi
- Kachi Mayu
- Kuntur Nasa
- Qullpa Jawira
- List of mountains in the Andes
