= Caquena Canton =

Caquena
- Canton
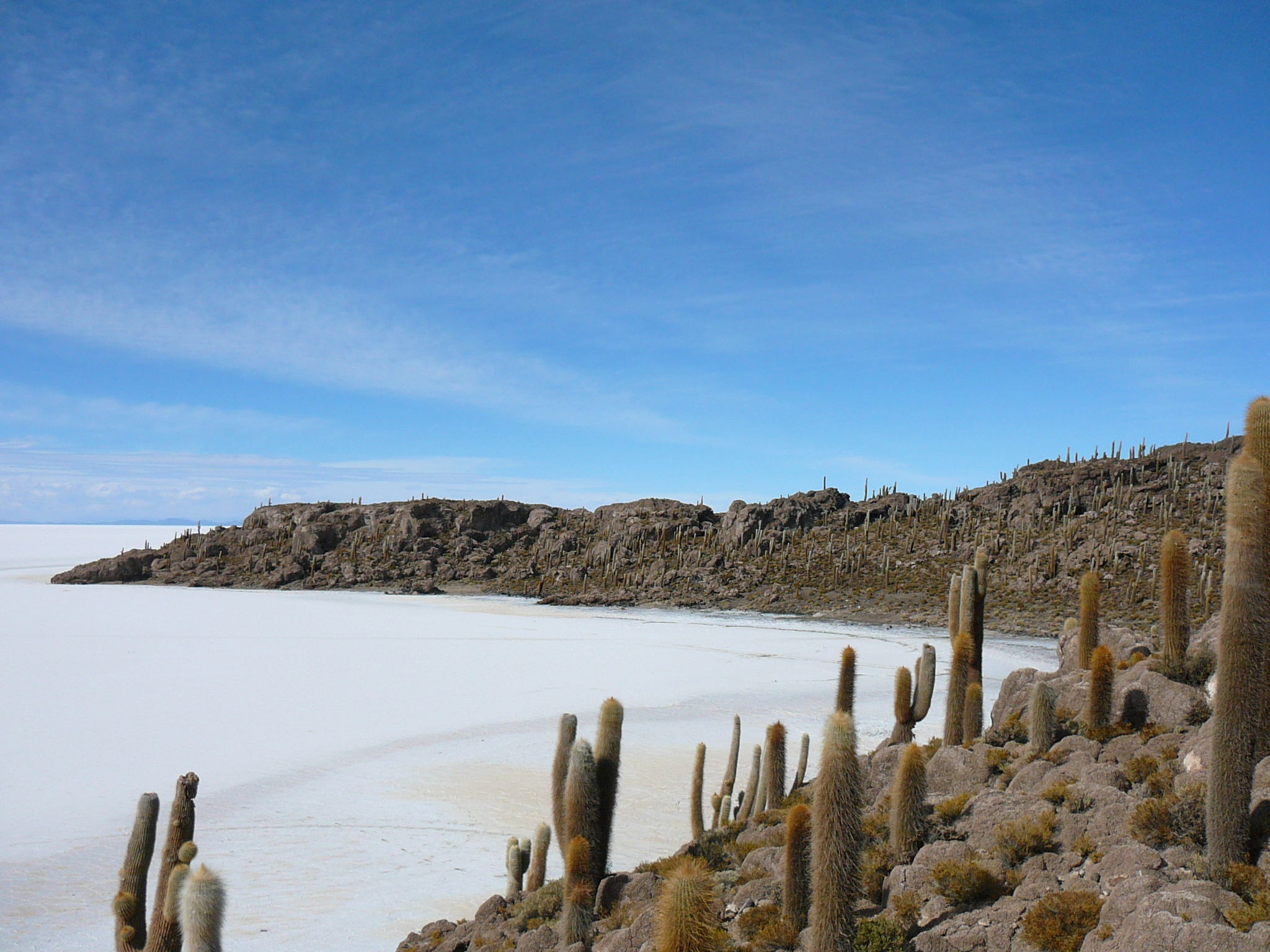
- Isla del Pescado, situated in the Caquena Canton

- Location of Coqueza within Bolivia
- Coordinates: 19°50′S 67°46′W
- Country: Bolivia
- Department: Potosí Department
- Province: Daniel Campos Province
- Municipality: Tahua Municipality
- Seat: Caquena

Population (2001)
  - Total: 325
- Time zone: UTC-4 (BST)

Caquena is one of the cantons of the Tahua Municipality, the second municipal section of the Daniel Campos Province in the Potosí Department of Bolivia. During the census of 2001 it had 325 inhabitants. Its seat is Caquena, situated at the Salar de Uyuni and west of Tunupa volcano.

== See also ==
- Isla del Pescado
- Inkawasi Island
