= Coqueza Canton =

Coqueza
- Canton
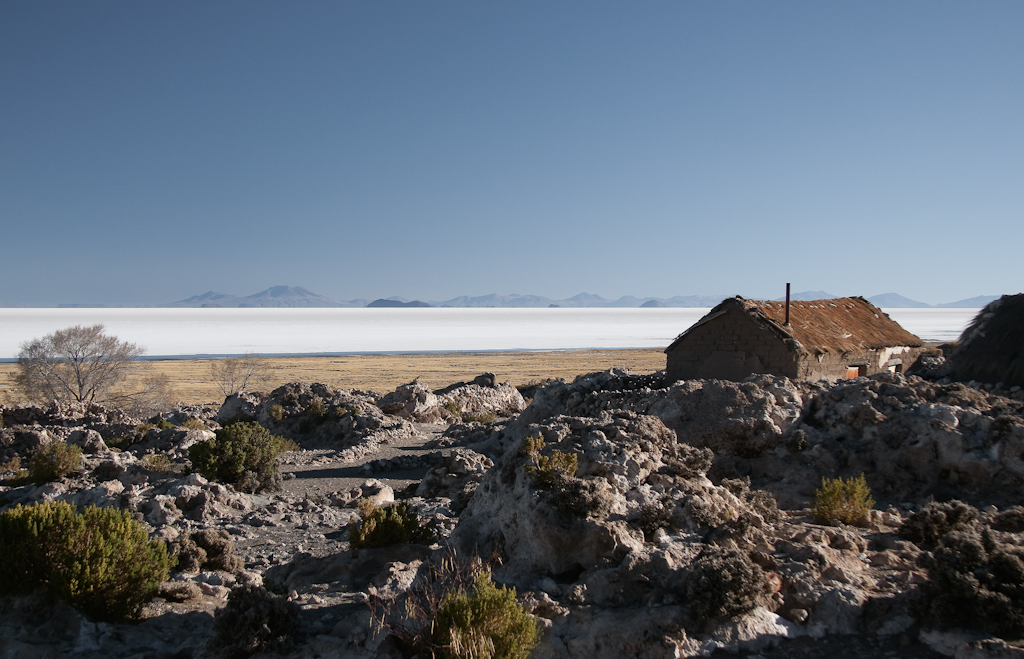
- The village of Coqueza with the Salar de Uyuni in the background

- Location of Coqueza within Bolivia
- Coordinates: 19°54′5″S 67°37′32″W
- Country: Bolivia
- Department: Potosí Department
- Province: Daniel Campos Province
- Municipality: Tahua Municipality
- Seat: Coqueza

Population (2001)
  - Total: 102
- Time zone: UTC-4 (BST)

Coqueza (also spelled Coquesa) is one of the cantons of the Tahua Municipality, the second municipal section of the Daniel Campos Province in the Potosí Department of Bolivia. During the census of 2001 it had 102 inhabitants. Its seat is Coqueza. The village is situated at the Salar de Uyuni and south of the Tunupa volcano.

== See also ==
- Inkawasi Island
- Isla del Pescado
