= Tahua Canton =

Tahua
- Canton
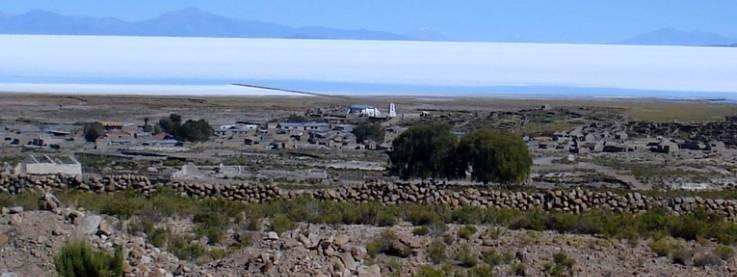
- The village of Tahua with the Salar de Uyuni in the background

- Location of Tahua within Bolivia
- Coordinates: 19°53′S 67°42′W
- Country: Bolivia
- Department: Potosí Department
- Province: Daniel Campos Province
- Municipality: Tahua Municipality
- Seat: Tahua

Population (2001)
  - Total: 673
- Time zone: UTC-4 (BST)

Tahua is one of the cantons of the Tahua Municipality, the second municipal section of the Daniel Campos Province in the Potosí Department of Bolivia. During the census of 2001 it had 673 inhabitants. Its seat is Tahua with a population of 271 in 2001.

== See also ==
- Inkawasi Island
- Isla del Pescado
- Salar de Uyuni
