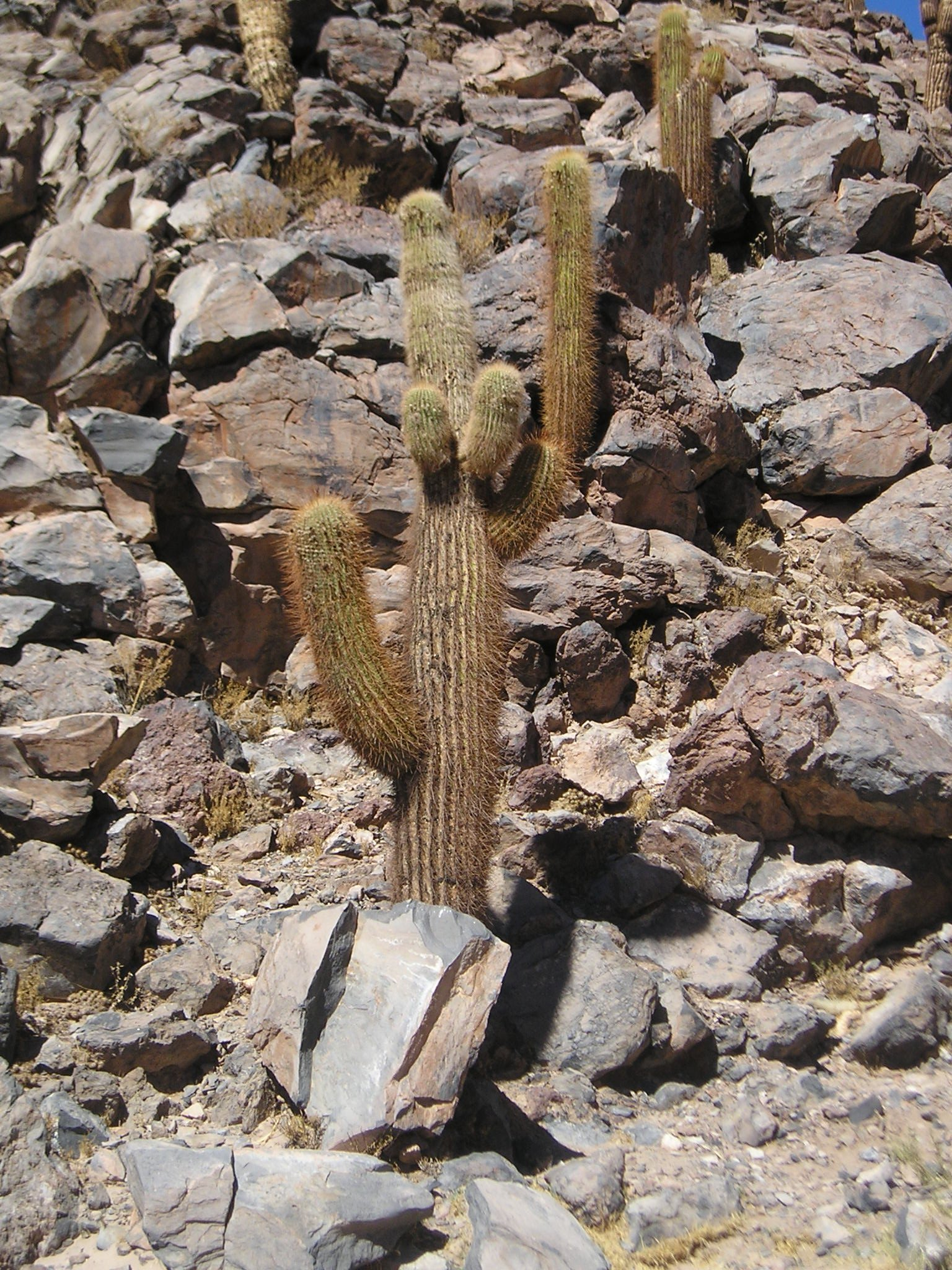

Conservation status
- Near Threatened (IUCN 3.1)

Scientific classification
- Kingdom: Plantae
- Clade: Tracheophytes
- Clade: Angiosperms
- Clade: Eudicots
- Order: Caryophyllales
- Family: Cactaceae
- Subfamily: Cactoideae
- Genus: Leucostele
- Species: L. atacamensis

Binomial name
- Leucostele atacamensis (Phil.) Schlumpb.

Synonyms
- Cereus atacamensis Phil. 1860; Echinopsis atacamensis (Phil.) H.Friedrich & G.D.Rowley 1974; Helianthocereus atacamensis (Phil.) Backeb. 1959; Trichocereus atacamensis (Phil.) W.T.Marshall & T.M.Bock 1941

= Leucostele atacamensis =

Species of cactus

Leucostele atacamensis (cardón) is a species of cactus from Chile, Argentina and Bolivia. The wood of this species can be used in building and in making furniture.

== Description ==
Leucostele atacamensis has a tall columnar habit, sometimes forming branches in a candelabra shape and becoming treelike. It grows to about 1.5–10 m (4.9–32.8 ft) high, with stems to 25–70 cm (9.8–27.6 in) across. The stems have 20-30 ribs and areoles have a diameter of up to 2 centimeters and become larger with age with 50-100 maroon coloured spines, the longest up to 30 cm (12 in) long. In younger plants, the yellowish to honey-colored thorns are strongly needle-like and up to 10 centimeters (rarely up to 15 centimeters) long. The two to four (rarely up to eight) central spines cannot always be clearly distinguished from the peripheral spines. The rose-white flowers are 10–14 cm (3.9–5.5 in) long, open day and night, borne on the sides of the stems. The dark green fruits are densely covered with hairs, up to 5 cm (2.0 in) long; they are edible.

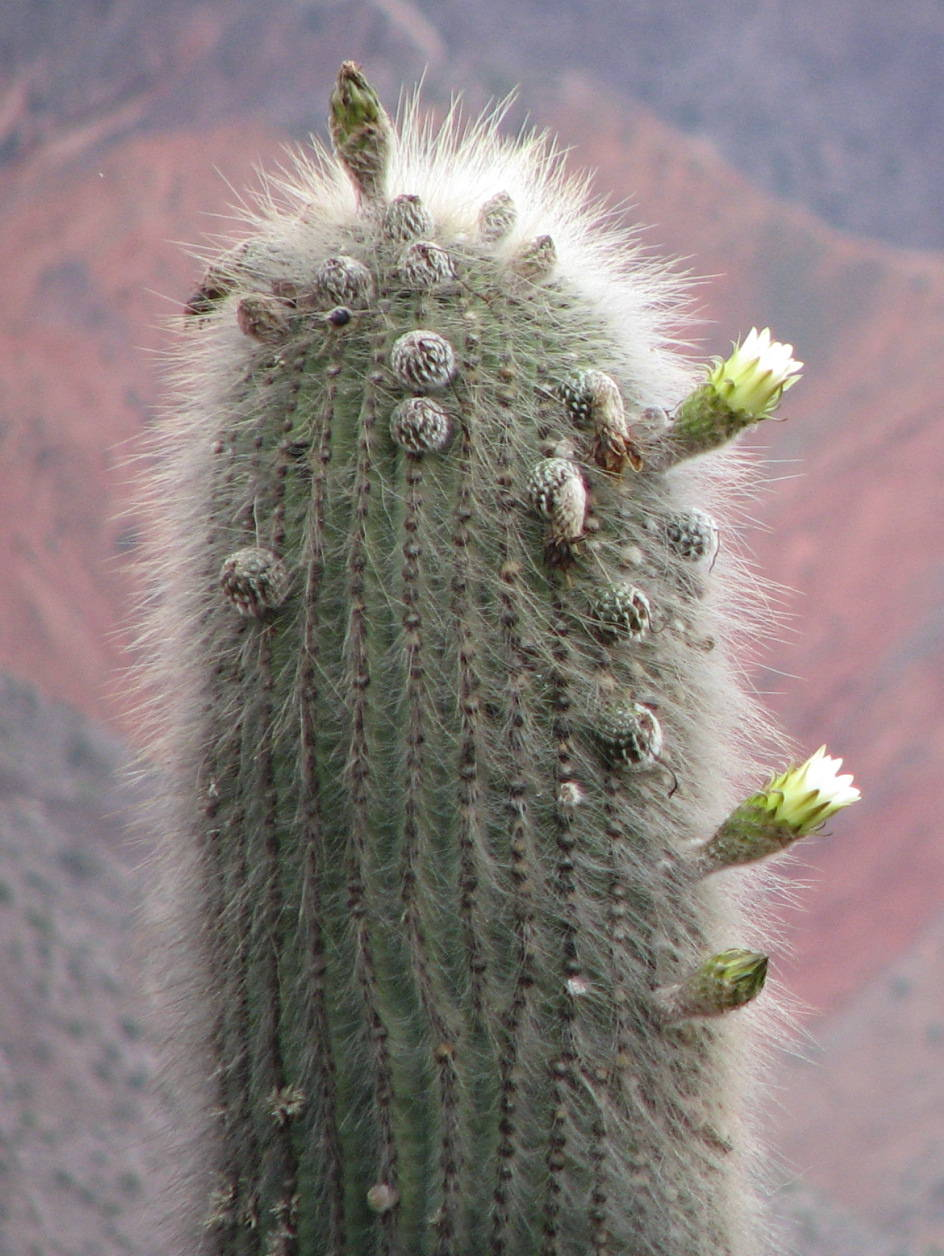
Flowering stem

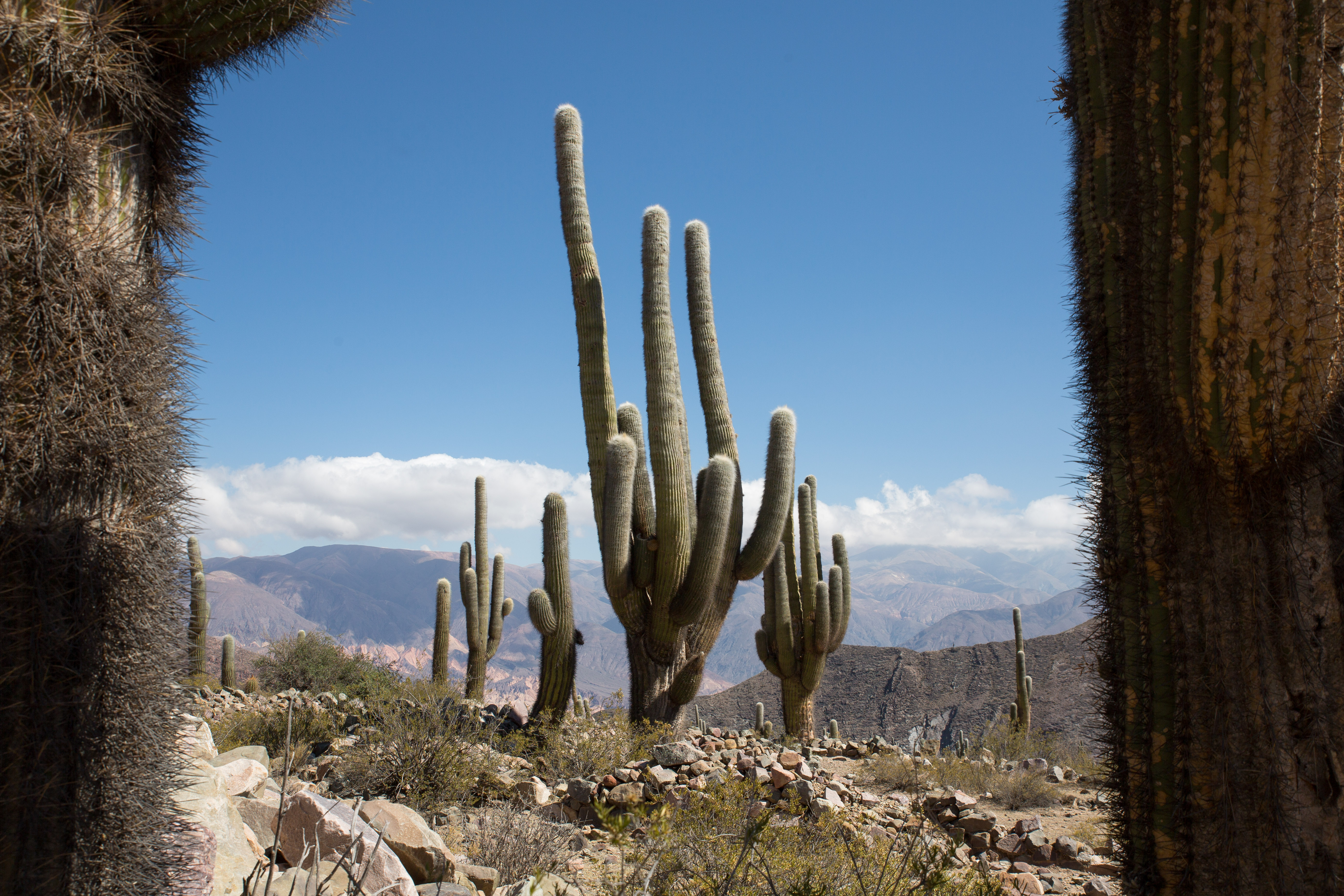
Very large specimen near Tilcara, Argentina

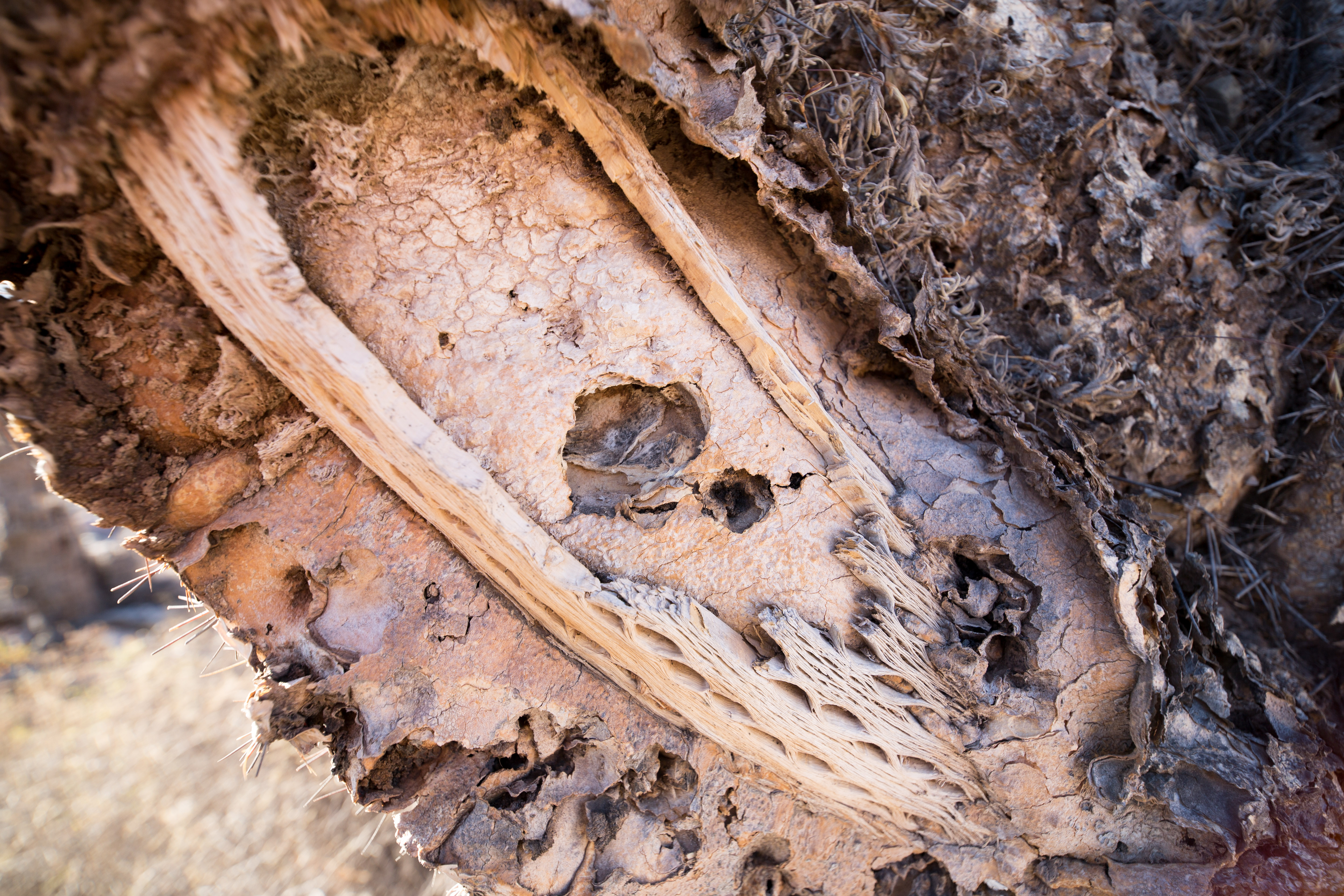
The inside structure: the internal bambus wood can easily be seen.

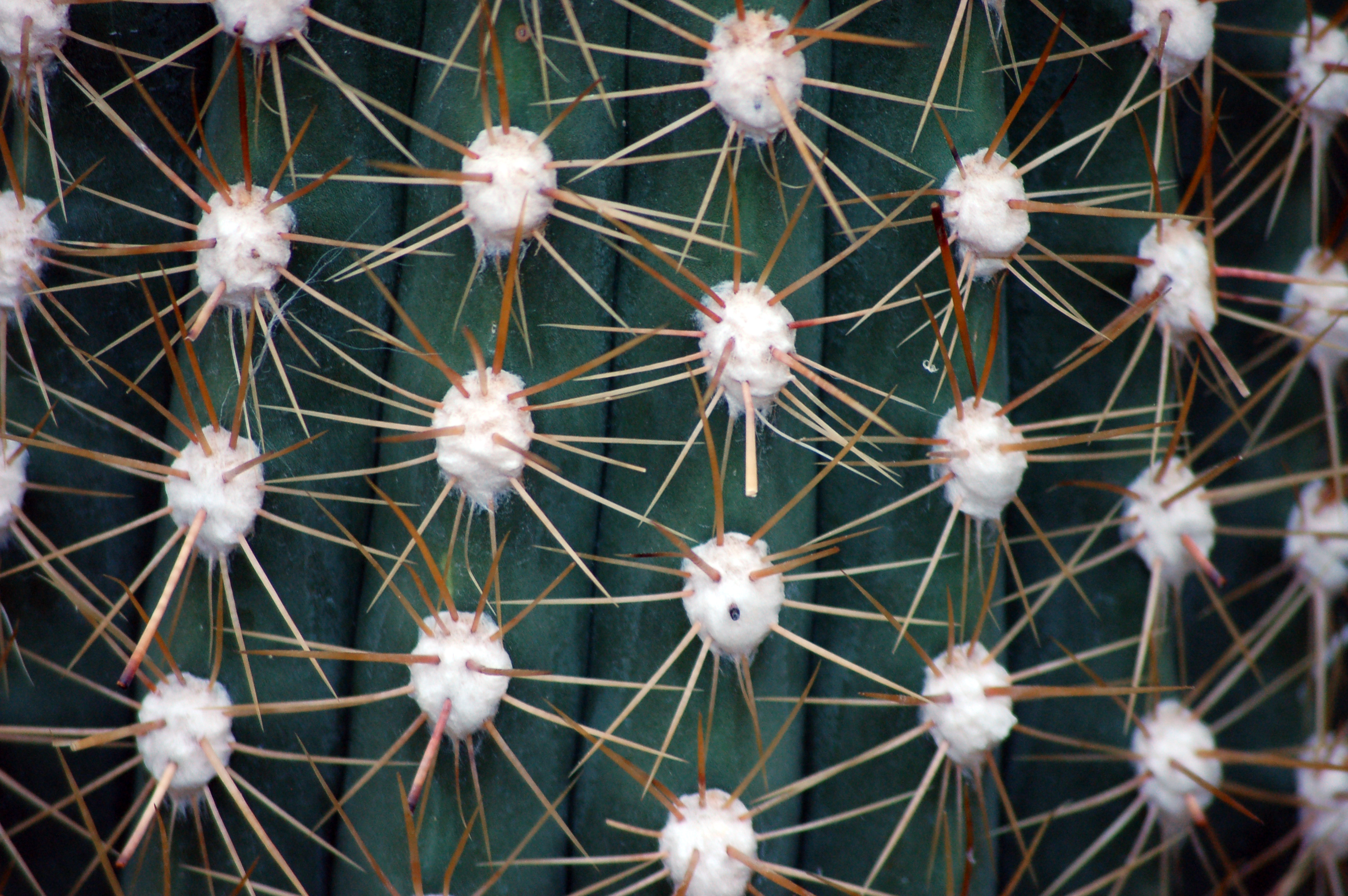
Spines

=== Subspecies ===
There are two recognized subspecies.

Image	Name	Description	Distribution
	Leucostele atacamensis subsp. pasacana (F.A.C.Weber ex Rümpler) Schlumpb.	often branched, 10 m (33 ft) tall	Argentina and Bolivia
	Leucostele atacamensis subsp. atacamensis	usually unbranched, less tall (up to 6 m (20 ft)	Chile.

== Distribution ==
Leucostele atacamensis is widespread in the northeast of Chile the regions of Antofagasta, Tarapacá, Arica and Parinacota; the southwest of Bolivia in departments of Oruro, Potosí, and Tarija; and the north of Argentina in the provinces of Jujuy, Salta, Tucumán, Catamarca, La Rioja, and San Juan at altitudes of 1700 to 3900 meters.

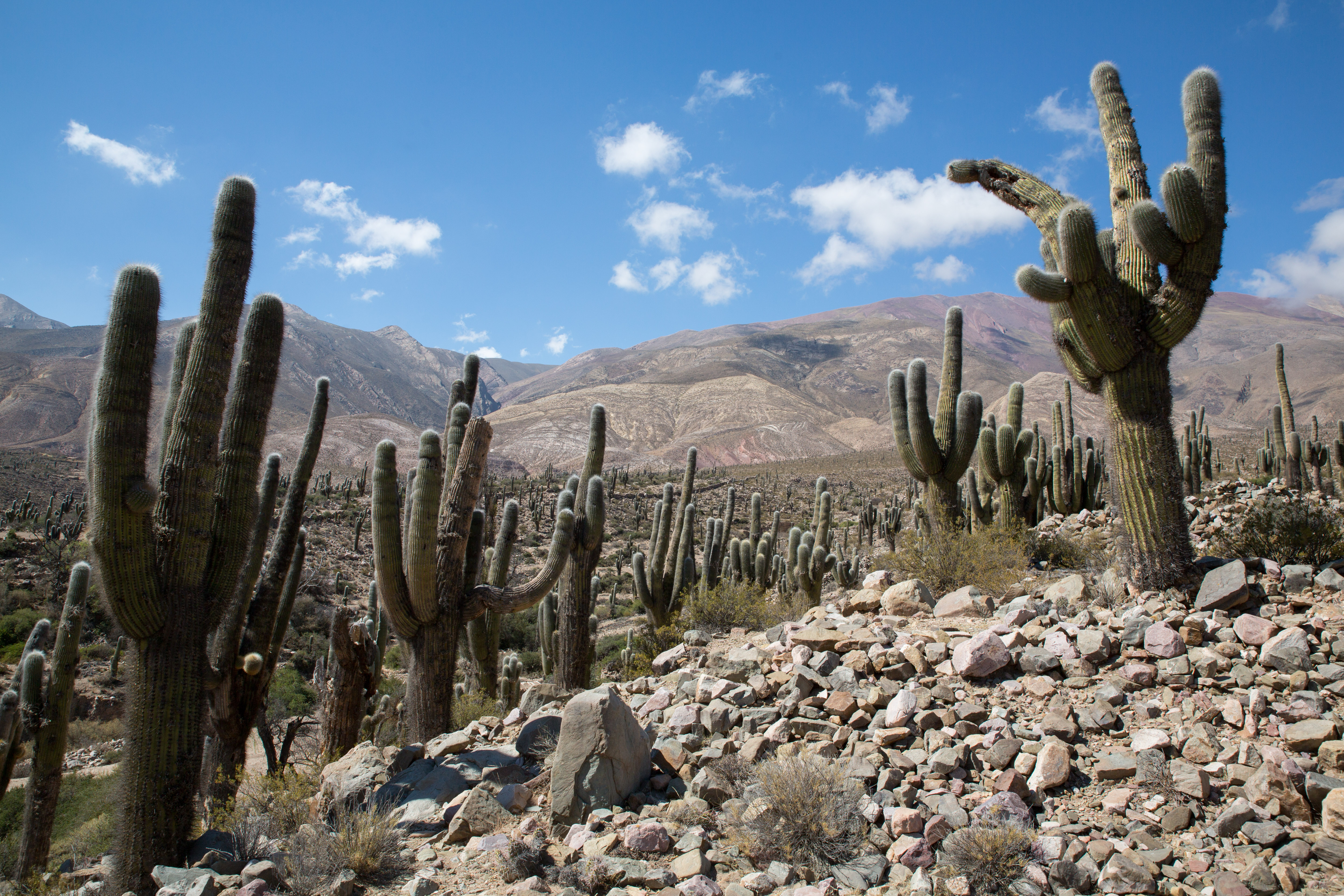
Leucostele atacamensis ssp. pasacana growing in habitat near Tilcara, Argentina

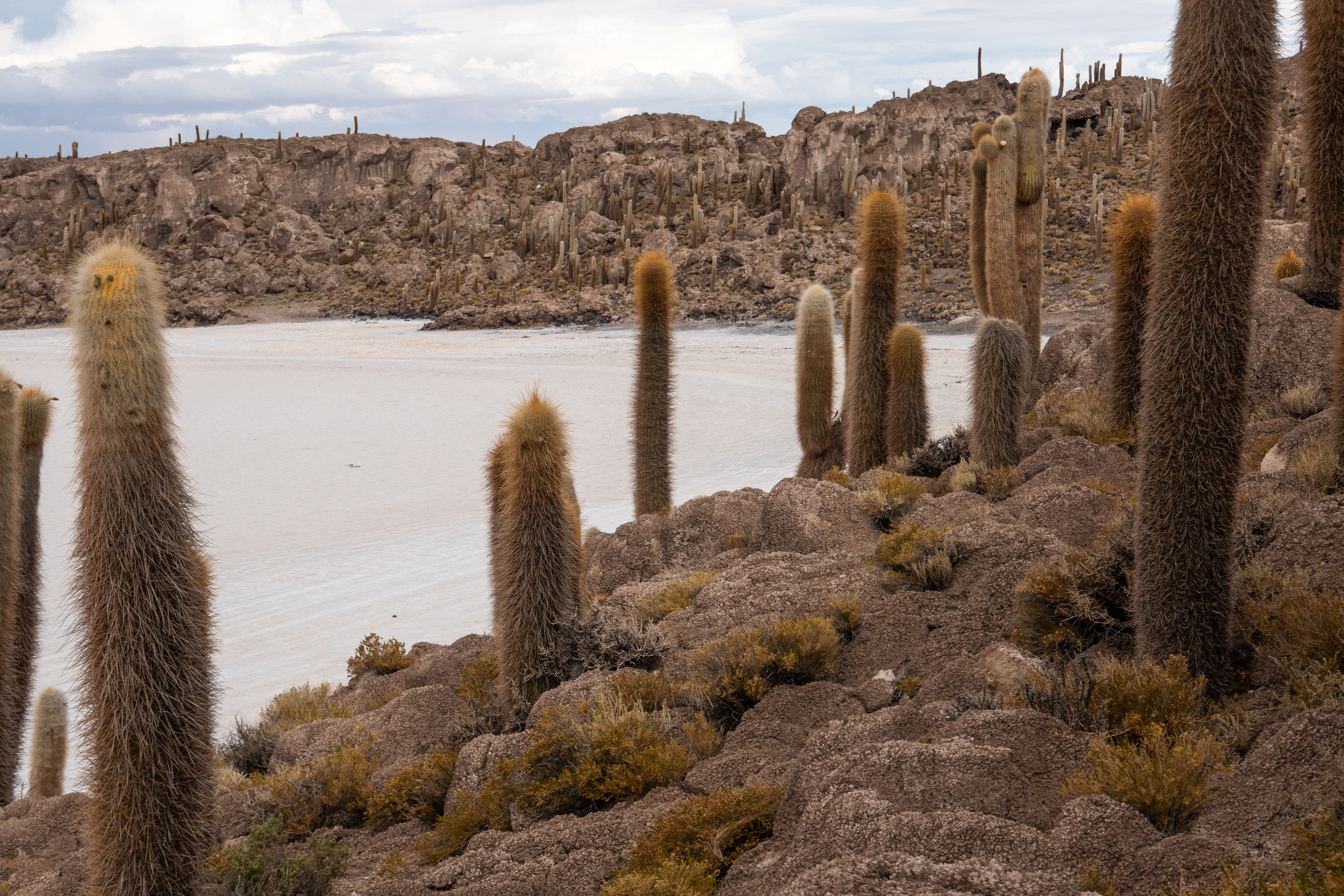
Leucostele atacamensis growing in habitat in Isla Incahuasi, Salar de Uyuni, Bolivia

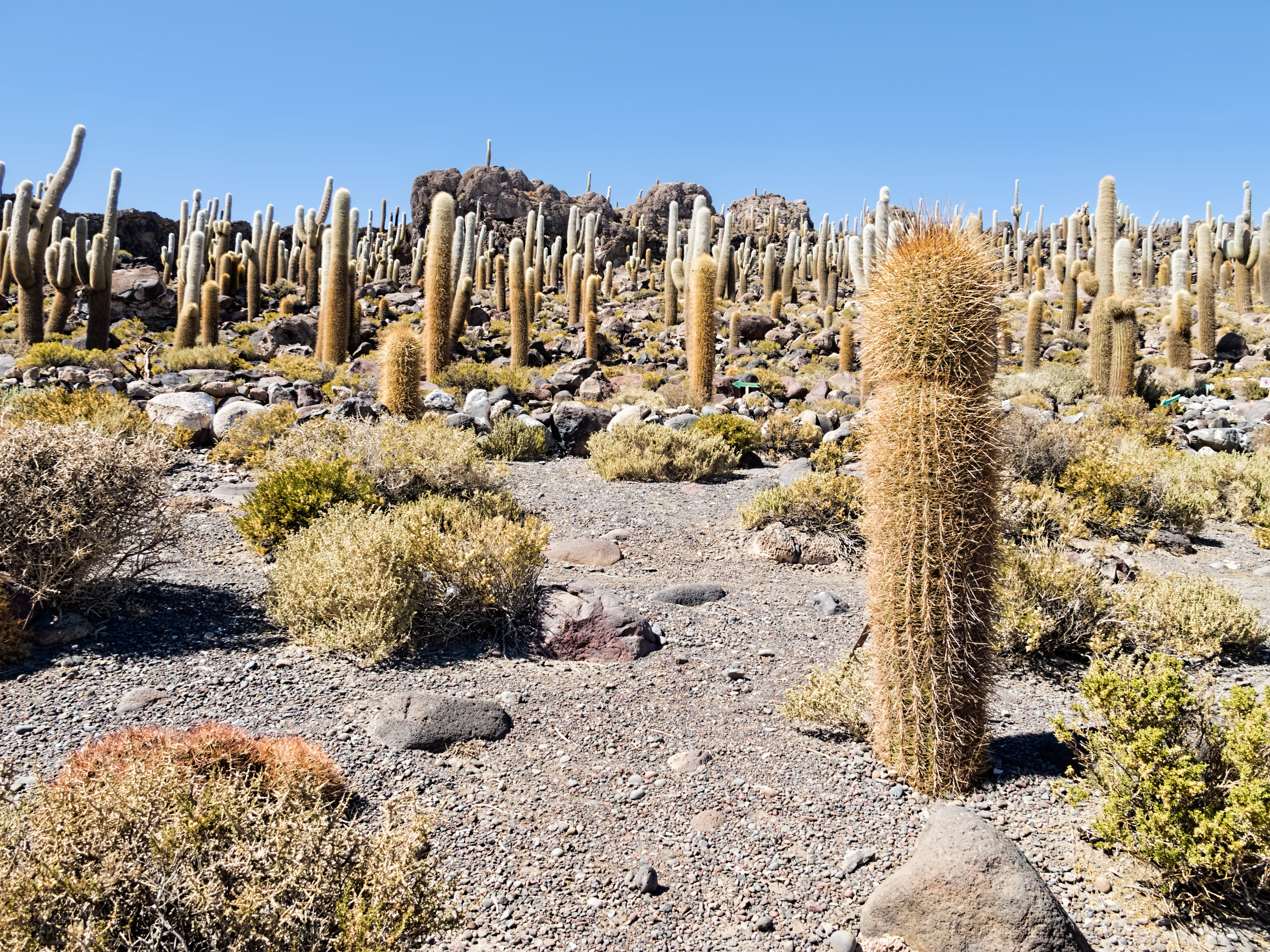
Leucostele atacamensis growing at Uyuni Salt Flat

== Systematics ==
Leucostele atacamensis was first described by Rodolfo Philippi as Cereus atacamensis in 1860. The specific epithet atacamensis refers to the higher mountain areas in the Atacama region of Chile, where the species is found. It was placed in a number of genera, including Trichocereus and Helianthocereus, before being moved to Echinopsis by Helmo Friedrich and Gordon Rowley in 1974. In 2012, Boris O. Schlumpberger reclassified the species into the genus Leucostele.
