= Yonza Canton =

Yonza
- Canton
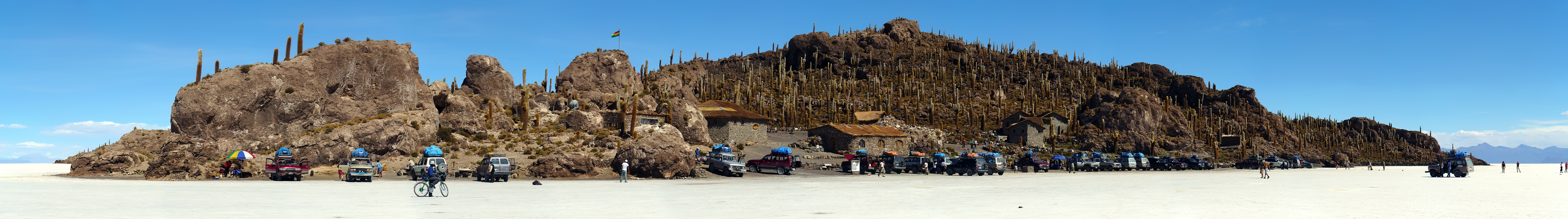
- Inkawasi Island, situated in the Yonza Canton

- Location of Coqueza within Bolivia
- Coordinates: 20°38′S 68°2′W
- Country: Bolivia
- Department: Potosí Department
- Province: Daniel Campos Province
- Municipality: Tahua Municipality
- Seat: Yonza

Population (2001)
  - Total: 363
- Time zone: UTC-4 (BST)

Yonza is one of the cantons of the Tahua Municipality, the second municipal section of the Daniel Campos Province in the Potosí Department of Bolivia. During the census of 2001 it had 363 inhabitants. Its seat is Yonza. The canton is situated on a peninsula that juts into Salar de Uyuni on its southern end.

== See also ==
- Inkawasi Island
- Isla del Pescado
