= Tahua Municipality =

Tahua Municipality Tawa
- Municipality
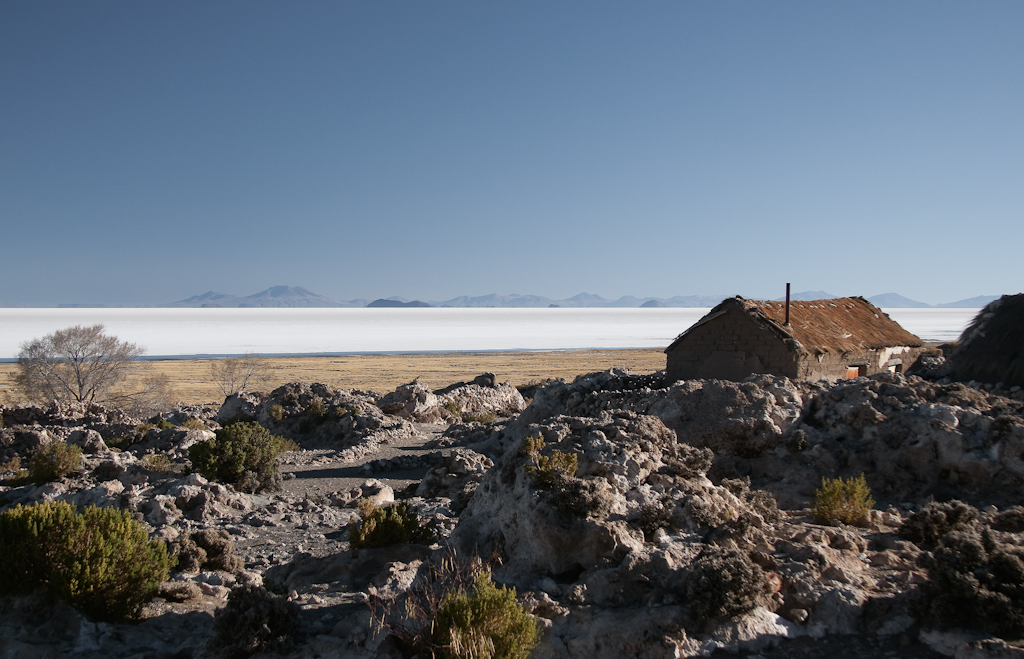
- The village of Coquesa and Salar de Uyuni in Tahua Municipality

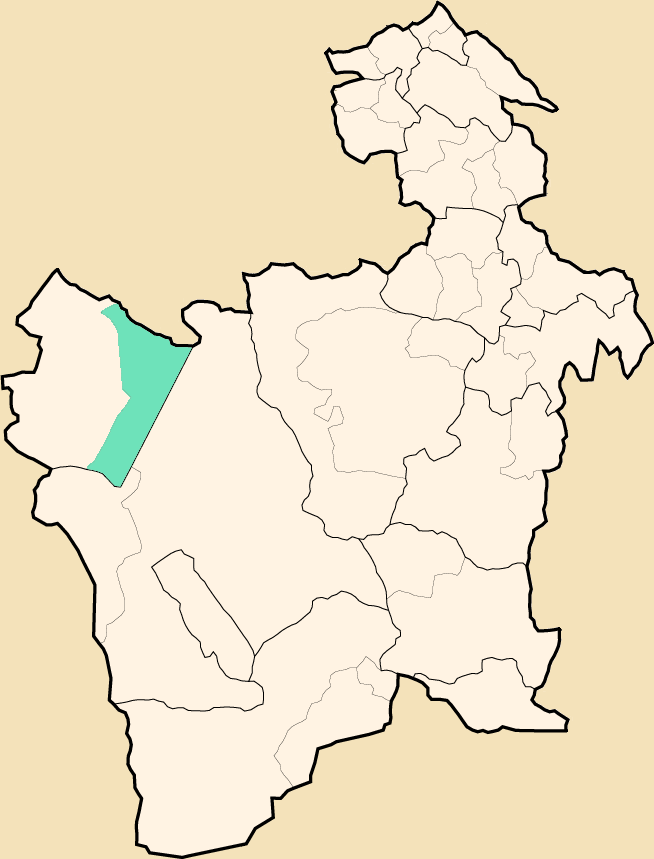
- Location within Potosí Department

- Location within Bolivia
- Coordinates: 20°18′S 67°24′W
- Country: Bolivia
- Department: Potosí Department
- Province: Daniel Campos Province
- Seat: Tahua

Area
  - Total: 1,263 sq mi (3,272 km^{2})
- Elevation: 12,100 ft (3,700 m)

Population (2001)
  - Total: 2,166
  - Ethnicities: Aymara
- Time zone: UTC-4 (BOT)

Tahua Municipality is the second municipal section of the Daniel Campos Province in the Potosí Department in Bolivia. Its seat is Tahua.

== Geography ==
Tahua Municipality lies in the Altiplano at the Uyuni salt flat.

Some of the highest mountains of the municipality are listed below:

- Ch'iyar Qullu
- Jisk'a Wat'a
- Lluqu Lluqu
- Muruq'u Qullu
- Wila Qullu
- Wila Wilani
- Jorth Carolina

== Subdivision ==
The municipality consists of the following cantons:

- Ayque
- Cacoma
- Caquena
- Coqueza
- Tahua
- Yonza

== The people ==
The people are predominantly indigenous citizens of Aymara descent.

Ethnic group	%
Quechua	6.0
Aymara	90.5
Guaraní, Chiquitos, Moxos	0.1
Not indigenous	3.3
Other indigenous groups	0.0

== See also ==
- Inkawasi Island
- Isla del Pescado
