= Tittivilla =

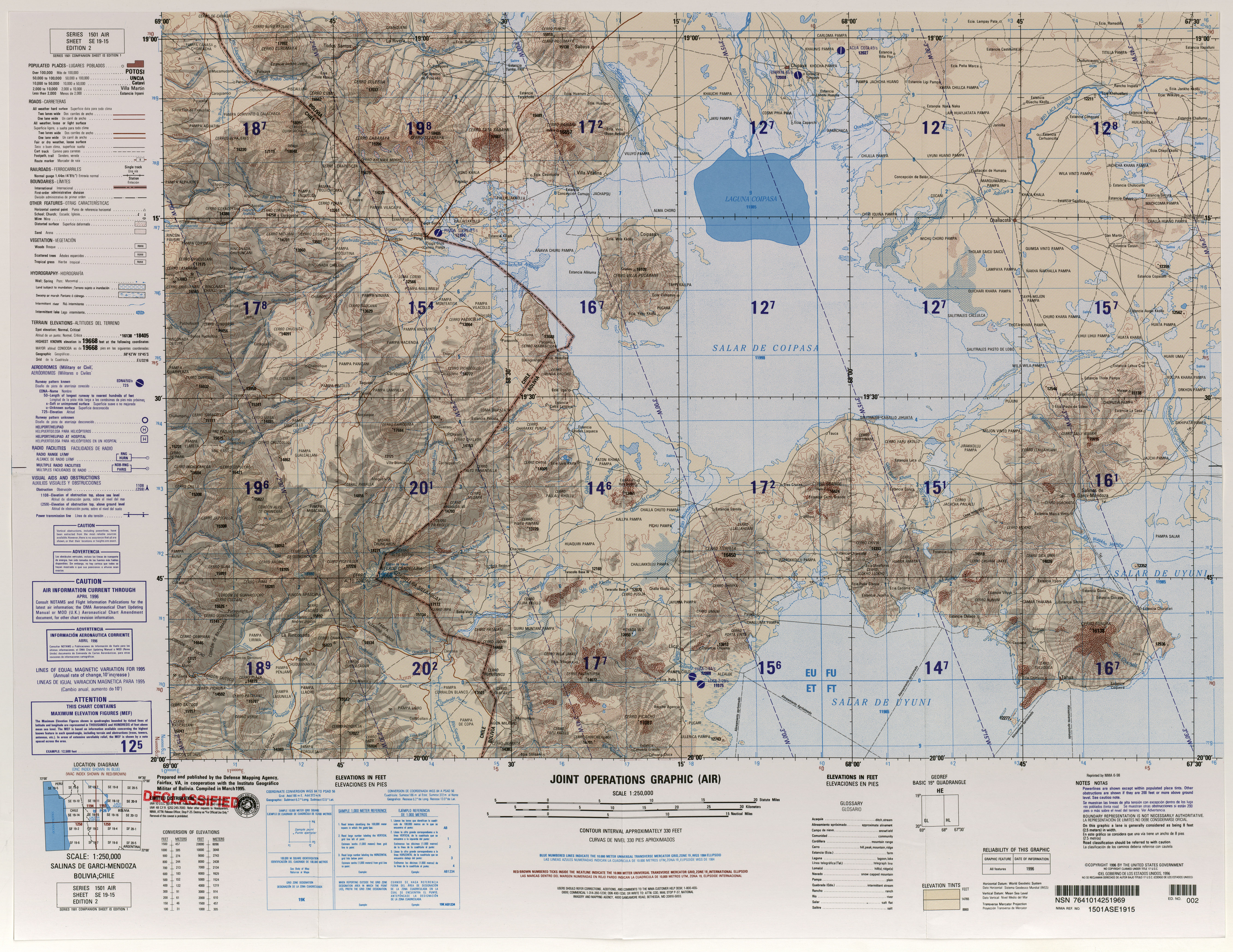
- Tittivilla is the first mountain below the image centre, slightly to the right.

Highest point
- Elevation: 5,050 m (16,570 ft)
- Coordinates: 19°43′S 68°11′W

Geography

Tittivilla (also known as Titivilla or Tetivila) is an eroded volcano in the Andes of Bolivia, on the isthmus separating the Salar de Coipasa in the north from the Salar de Uyuni. The maximum slope in its summit area is 30°. The stratovolcano and neighbouring Tunupa formed 3.5-2.5 mya on NE-SW and NNE-SSW structures, it belongs to the Tungapujo-Guachacoyo volcanic chain. The volcanoes are formed from andesite and dacite belonging to potassium-rich calc-alkaline series.

Tittivilla underwent an edifice collapse that triggered a 20 kilometres (12 mi) long debris avalanche. The avalanche descended an altitude of 1,350 metres (4,430 ft) with an azimuth 68° and covered a surface area of 189 square kilometres (73 sq mi). The slide left a 6 kilometres (3.7 mi) wide amphitheatre on the east-northeast side of the volcano that cut through older lava flows, the amphitheatre was originally interpreted to be an explosion crater.

The northern side of the avalanche has large blocks up to several kilometres of length that are hard to distinguish from eroded lavas from the neighbouring Cerro Grande. The eastern sector contains megablocks and hummocks. The southern part of the slide has a much smaller scale hummocky topography. The topography of the slide was buried by the highstands of the Altiplano lakes and contains lacustrine deposits. The 28000BP Lake Minchin and 50000BP Lake Escara paleolakes certainly submerged the slide deposits.

The volcano was active in the Pliocene-Pleistocene. A lava flow within the slide scar is the only clear post-collapse volcanic activity. It originates in the northern part of the slide mouth and continues for 7 kilometres (4.3 mi) to the shores of the Salar de Coipasa.
