= Tunupa =

Volcano in Bolivia

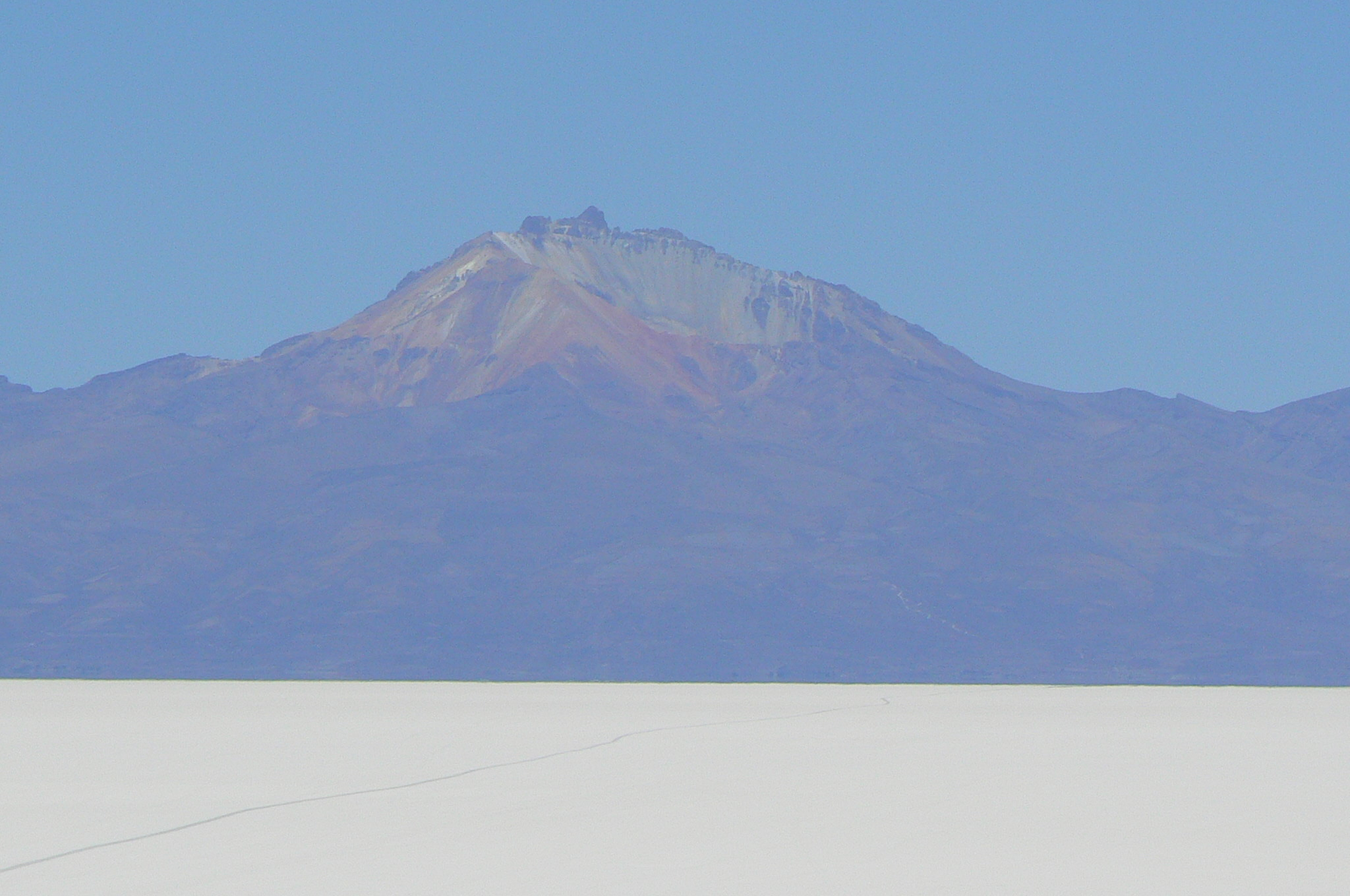
- Tunupa and Salar de Uyuni.

Highest point
- Elevation: 5,321 m (17,457 ft)
- Prominence: 1,601 m (5,253 ft)
- Listing: Ultra
- Coordinates: 19°49′57″S 67°38′45″W

Geography
- Location within Bolivia
- Location: Potosí Department, Bolivia

Tunupa is a dormant volcano in the Potosí Department of southwestern Bolivia.

It stands on the northern side of the Salar de Uyuni at an elevation of 5,321 m (17,457 ft) on the Bolivian Altiplano. Tunupa was active in the Pleistocene, with most of the volcano constructed by lava flows that erupted between 1.36 and 1.56 million years ago. Later glaciers developed on the mountain.

There is a cave with several mummies about halfway up and an ancient village at the foot with a modest "salt hotel".

== Geography and geomorphology ==
Tunupa is located in Bolivia, at the centre of the Altiplano about 115 kilometres (71 mi) east of the main volcanic arc. It forms a peninsula in the Salar de Uyuni, which surrounds the volcano on its southern side. The volcano is located within the Salinas de Garci-Mendoza municipality, and the towns of Ayque, Coquesa and Jirira lie on its southern slopes.

Volcanism in the backarc of the Central Andes is represented by several types of volcanoes, including several monogenetic volcanoes, stratovolcanoes such as Cerro Tuzgle, Tunupa and Uturunku and large ignimbrites like Altiplano-Puna volcanic complex, Galán, Los Frailes volcanic field and Morococala.

The volcano rises about 1.8 kilometres (1.1 mi) above the surrounding terrain, the summit of the volcano is heavily hydrothermally altered and its summit crater degraded by erosion, with crags representing remnants of the old lava conduit. Several lava domes were emplaced on top of lava flows from Tunupa on its eastern flank. Pyroclastic flows are found on the northern flank. Erosion and glaciation have generated a deposit of eroded material that surrounds much of the volcano.

There is no present-day permanent ice on Tunupa as the region is too dry but the mountain was glaciated in the past, and large valley glaciers descended to elevations of 3,650–3,700 metres (11,980–12,140 ft) when they reached their largest extent. Later shorter glaciers reoccupied the same valleys; outwash gravel deposits are found downstream below the moraines, such as below the Chalchala and Pocolli valleys on the southern flank of the volcano where most glacial landforms are found. Glacial landforms include glacial striae and ice drift deposits are found on the volcano, as are several extensive moraine systems. Three separate stages of glaciation have been inferred at Tunupa, one dating proposal dates the first advance to about 160,000 before present, the second lasts until about 15,000 years/may coincide with the existence of Lake Tauca before present and the last one occurred during the Younger Dryas.

The southern slopes of Tunupa are incised by the shorelines of former lakes that occupied the Altiplano, such as Lake Minchin and Lake Tauca. Crusts of algae, stromatolites and river deltas are also found at these former shorelines. Over seven separate shoreline stages have been identified at Tunupa, which was part of an island in Lake Tauca. It is likely that evaporation from the lake increased precipitation at Tunupa and thus allowed glaciers to grow to larger sizes than they would have without such evaporation.

== Geology ==
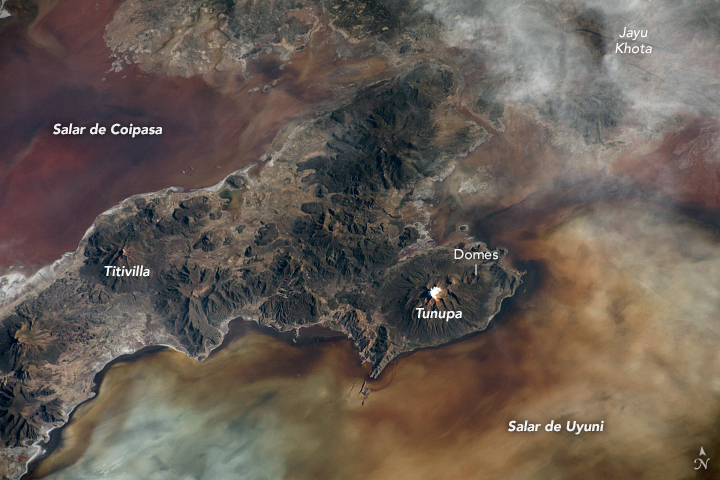
Tunupa Volcano, Bolivia from ISS

Subduction has been occurring off the western margin of South America for the past 200 million years. Presently, the Nazca Plate is subducting eastward below South America. The subduction is responsible for the formation of the Altiplano high plateau; the Tibetan Plateau is the only other place in the world where oceanic subduction has generated a high plateau.

Volcanism in the Andes occurs in a frontal volcanic arc, but also in the back-arc region. This back-arc volcanism that Tunupa is part of has an uncertain origin; one proposed process is delamination, whereby the lowermost mafic section of the crust and lithosphere underneath separates itself from the above lying layers. This separation process then triggers volcanic activity through either decompression melting, dehydration melting, increases in temperature, or some combination of these processes. Back-arc volcanism in the region started about 25-30 million years ago.

East of Tunupa lie the Huayrana lavas, which are much older (Potassium-argon dating has yielded an age of 11.1 ± 0.4 million years ago). Tunupa and Sillajhuay farther west form a chain of volcanoes known as the Serranía Intersalar, which lies within the so-called Pica gap where recent volcanism is rare. This chain of volcanoes was active starting from the Oligocene to the Quaternary.

=== Composition ===
Tunupa is formed principally by andesite, trachyandesite and trachydacite, forming a potassium-rich calc-alkaline suite. The rocks contain phenocrysts of amphibole, biotite, clinopyroxene, uncommon olivine, uncommon orthopyroxene, oxides and plagioclase. The lava domes are more silicic than the main volcanic edifice.

An average magma output of 0.00043–0.00093 cubic kilometres per year (0.00010–0.00022 mi^{3}/a) has been estimated, which is comparable to Lascar and Parinacota. Delamination of the crust, hydration-induced melting and magma mixing processes have been used to explain the magma chemistry at Tunupa. It has been proposed that as the lower crust undergoes delamination, certain water-containing minerals such as amphibole and phlogopite become unstable and enrich magma with niobium, tantal and titanium.

== Climate ==
Average temperatures at Oruro are 9.5 °C (49.1 °F). While they decrease to 0 °C (32 °F) at an elevation of about 4,800 metres (15,700 ft), the dry climate of the region limits the development of glaciers; average precipitation is less than 200 millimetres per year (7.9 in/year) in the southwestern Altiplano.

== Eruption history ==
Initial Potassium-argon dating has yielded ages of 2.5 ± 0.5 and 1.8 ± 0.2 million years ago on samples from Tunupa. Later performed argon-argon dating produced ages between 1.55 ± 0.01 and 1.40 ± 0.04 million years ago, with even younger dates of 440,000 ± 40,000 years before present. The main edifice developed first, the lava domes were emplaced later. The volcano is considered to be extinct.

== Mythology ==
In Aymara legends, Tunupa is personified as a deity with varying attributes and often linked to legends about the origin of the Salar de Uyuni.

== See also ==
- List of volcanoes in Bolivia
- List of Ultras of South America
- Altiplano Region
- Tittivilla
