= Isla Incahuasi =

Former island in Bolivian salt flat

Coordinates: 20°14′34″S 67°37′31″W

Isla Incahuasi, Inkawasi or Inka Wasi (Spanish Isla island, Quechua Inka, Inca wasi house, "Inca house"), also known as Isla del Pescado ("island of the fish"), is a hilly and rocky outcrop of land and former island in Bolivia situated in the middle of Salar de Uyuni, the world's largest salt flat, at an elevation of 3,656 meters (11,995 feet). It is located in the Potosí Department, Daniel Campos Province, Tahua Municipality, Yonza Canton.

Incahuasi has a total area of 24.62 hectares (61 acres) and hosts gigantic cacti (Trichocereus pasacana) and a tourist center. There are unusual and fragile coral-like structures and deposits that often consist of fossils and algae. The place is the top of the remains of an ancient volcano, which was submerged when the area was part of a giant prehistoric lake, roughly 40,000 years ago.

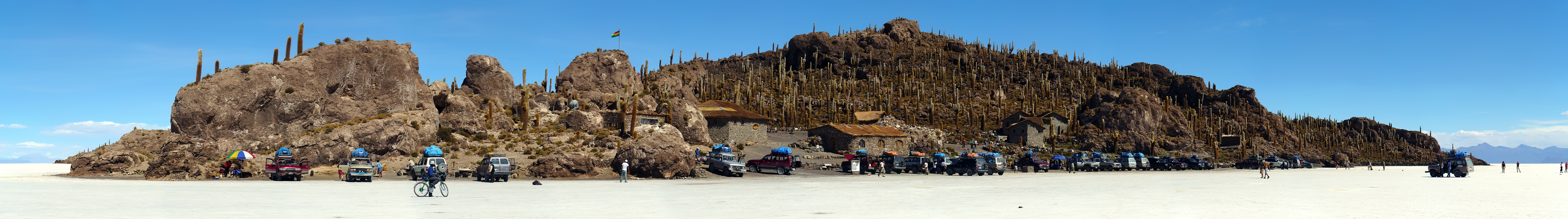
Incahuasi in the center of the Salar

== See also ==
- Uyuni
