= Salar de Uyuni =

Salt flat in Bolivia

Salar de Uyuni Salar de Tunupa (Spanish)
- Dry lake
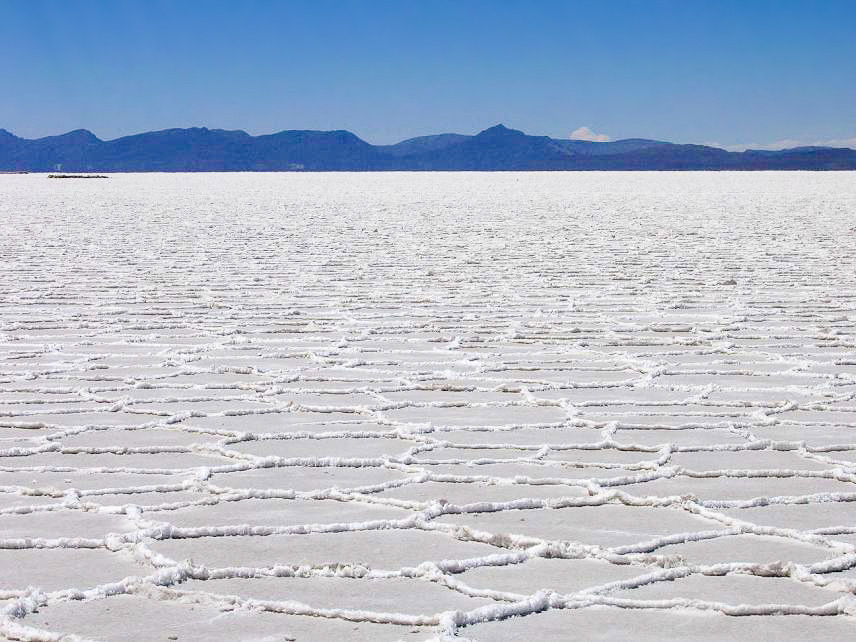
- Hexagonal formations in the Salar de Uyuni during the dry season.

- Location within Bolivia
- Coordinates: 20°08′01.59″S 67°29′20.88″W
- Location: Daniel Campos Province, Potosí, Bolivia
- Formed by: Evaporation
- Geology: Salt pan

Area
  - Total: 10,582 square kilometres (4,086 sq mi)

Dimensions
  - Length: average of 126 km (78 mi)
  - Width: average of 84 km (52 mi)
  - Depth: 130 metres (430 ft)
- Elevation: 3,663 m (12,018 ft)

Salar de Uyuni is the largest salt flat in the world, with an area of approximately 10,582 square kilometres (4,086 mi^{2}). It is situated in southwestern Bolivia, within the Daniel Campos Province of the Potosí Department, near the crest of the Andes Mountains, at an elevation of 3,656 m (11,995 ft) above sea level.

The Salar was formed as a result of transformations of seven Late Pleistocene lakes whose progressive desiccation led to the accumulation of extensive evaporitic salt deposits. It is now covered by an 8-meter-thick layer of salt, which is extremely flat. The average elevation varies by less than one meter over the entire area of the Salar. The crust serves as a source of salt and covers a pool of brine, which is exceptionally rich in lithium. The large area, clear skies, and exceptional flatness of the surface make the Salar ideal for calibrating the altimeters of Earth observation satellites. Following rain, a thin layer of dead calm water transforms the flat into the world's largest mirror, 129 km (80 miles) across.

The Salar serves as the major transport route across the Bolivian Altiplano and is a prime breeding ground for several species of flamingos. Salar de Uyuni is also a climatological transitional zone since the towering tropical cumulus congestus and cumulonimbus incus clouds that form in the eastern part of the salt flat during the summer cannot permeate beyond its drier western edges, near the Chilean border and the Atacama Desert.

The Salar has been used as a filming location for movies such as The Fall (2006), Salt and Fire (2016), The Unseen (2017), Star Wars: The Last Jedi (2017), and several others.

== Name ==
Salar means salt flat in Spanish. Uyuni originates from the Aymara language and means a pen (enclosure); Uyuni is also the name of a town that serves as a gateway for tourists visiting the Salar.

Aymara legend tells that the mountains Tunupa, Kusku, and Kusina, which surround the Salar, were giants. Tunupa married Kusku, but Kusku ran away from her with Kusina. Grieving Tunupa started to cry while breastfeeding her son. Her tears mixed with milk and formed the Salar. Many locals consider the Tunupa an important deity and say that the place should be called Salar de Tunupa rather than Salar de Uyuni.

== Formation, geology, and climate ==
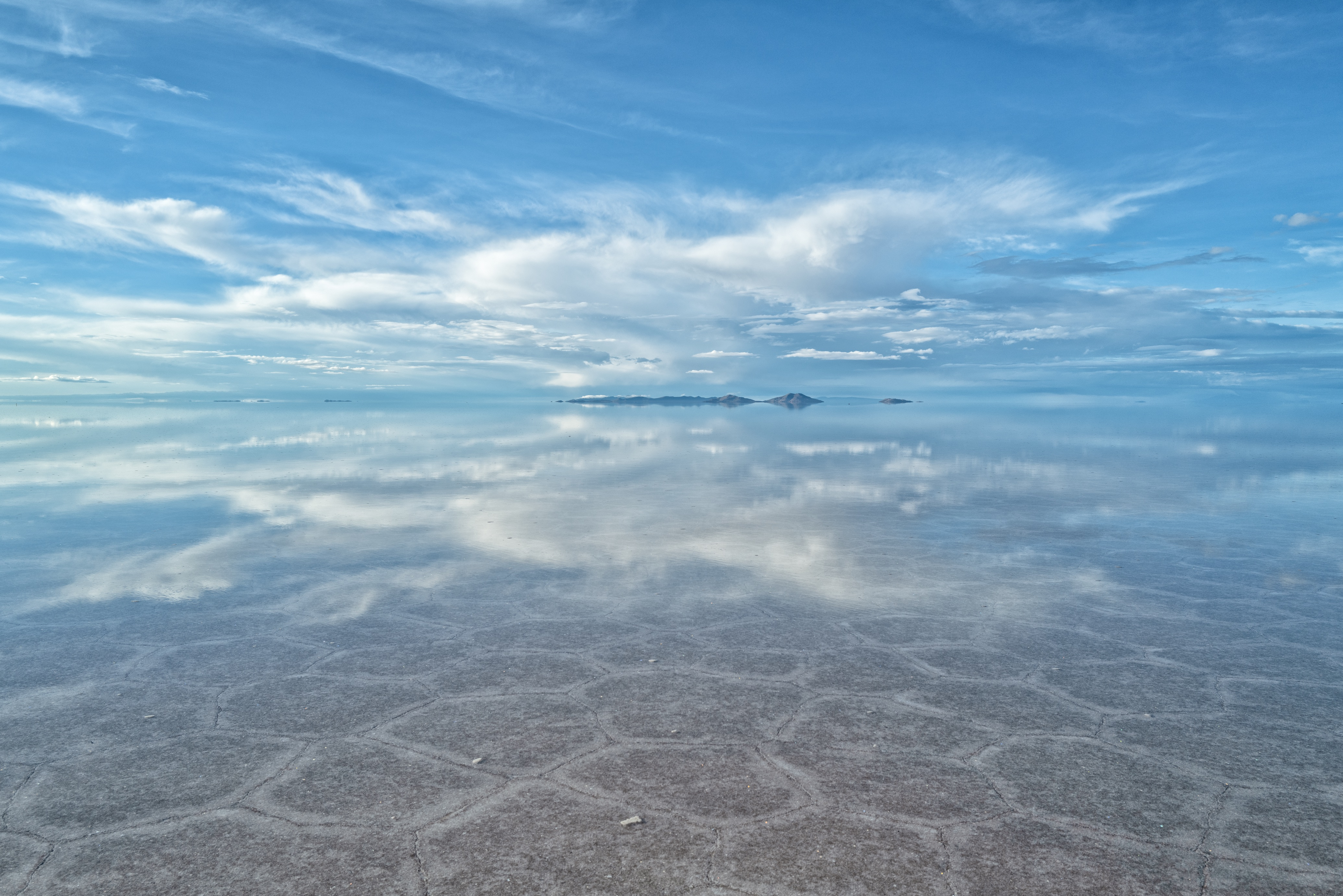
Natural reflections in the Salar de Uyuni during the rainy season

The Salar de Uyuni is part of the Altiplano of Bolivia in South America. The Altiplano is a high plateau, which was formed during the uplift of the Andes mountains. The plateau includes fresh and saltwater lakes as well as salt flats and is endorheic.

The geological history of the Salar is associated with a sequential transformation between several vast lakes. Some 30,000 to 42,000 years ago, the area was part of a giant prehistoric lake, Lake Minchin. Its age was estimated by radiocarbon dating shells from outcropping sediments and carbonate reefs and varies between reported studies. Lake Minchin (named after Juan B. Minchin of Oruro) later transformed into Paleo Lake Tauca having a maximal depth of 140 meters (460 ft), and an estimated age of 13,000 to 18,000 or 14,900 to 26,100 years, depending on the source. The youngest prehistoric lake was Coipasa, which was radiocarbon dated to 11,500 to 13,400 years ago. When it dried, it left behind two modern lakes, Poopó and Uru Uru, and two major salt deserts, Salar de Coipasa and the larger Salar de Uyuni. Salar de Uyuni spreads over 10,582 km^{2}, which is roughly 100 times the size of the Bonneville Salt Flats in the United States. Lake Poopó is a neighbor of the much larger Lake Titicaca. During the wet season, Titicaca overflows and discharges into Poopó, which in turn, floods Salar De Coipasa and Salar de Uyuni.

Lacustrine mud that is interbedded with salt and saturated with brine underlies the surface of Salar de Uyuni. The brine is a saturated solution of sodium chloride, lithium chloride, and magnesium chloride in water. It is covered with a solid salt crust varying in thickness between tens of centimeters and a few meters. The center of the Salar contains a few islands, which are the remains of the tops of ancient volcanoes submerged during the era of Lake Minchin. They include unusual and fragile coral-like structures and deposits that often consist of fossils and algae.

=== Climate ===
The area has a relatively stable average temperature with a peak at 21 °C (70 °F) in November to January, and a low of 13 °C (55 °F) in June. The nights are cold all through the year, with temperatures between −9 and 5 °C (16 and 41 °F). The relative humidity is rather low and constant throughout the year at 30% to 45%. The rainfall is also low at 1 to 3 mm (0.039 to 0.118 in) per month between April and November, but it may increase up to 80 mm (3.1 in) in January. However, except for January, even in the rainy season, the number of rainy days is fewer than 5 per month.

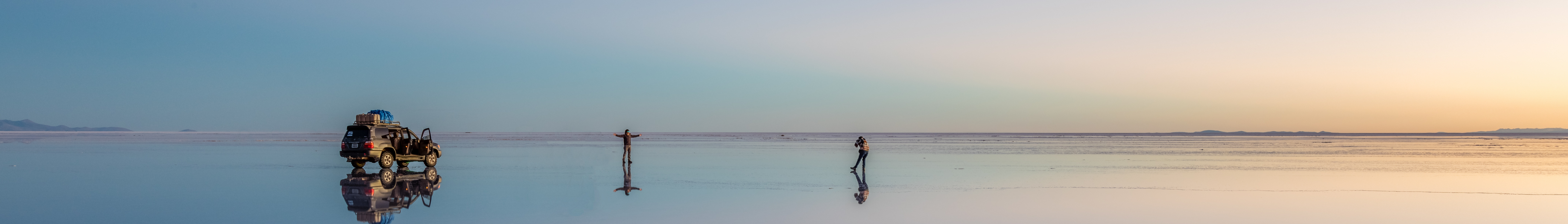
During the rainy season (December to April), the flat turns into a shallow lake and becomes the world's largest natural mirror, featuring a reflection of the sky.

== Economic influence ==
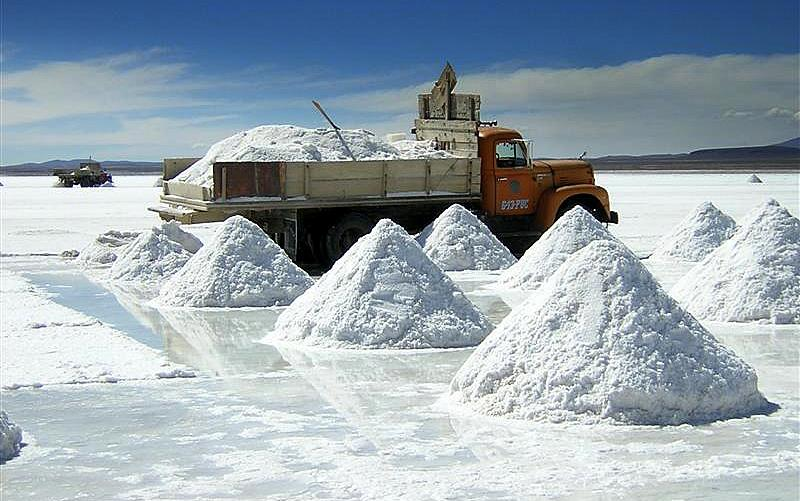
Salt production at the salar

Located in the Lithium Triangle, the Salar contains a large amount of sodium, potassium, lithium and magnesium (all in the chloride forms of NaCl, KCl, LiCl and MgCl_{2}, respectively), as well as borax. As of 2024, with an estimated 23 mln. t, Bolivia holds about 22% of the world's known lithium resources (105 mln. tons); most of those are in the Salar de Uyuni.

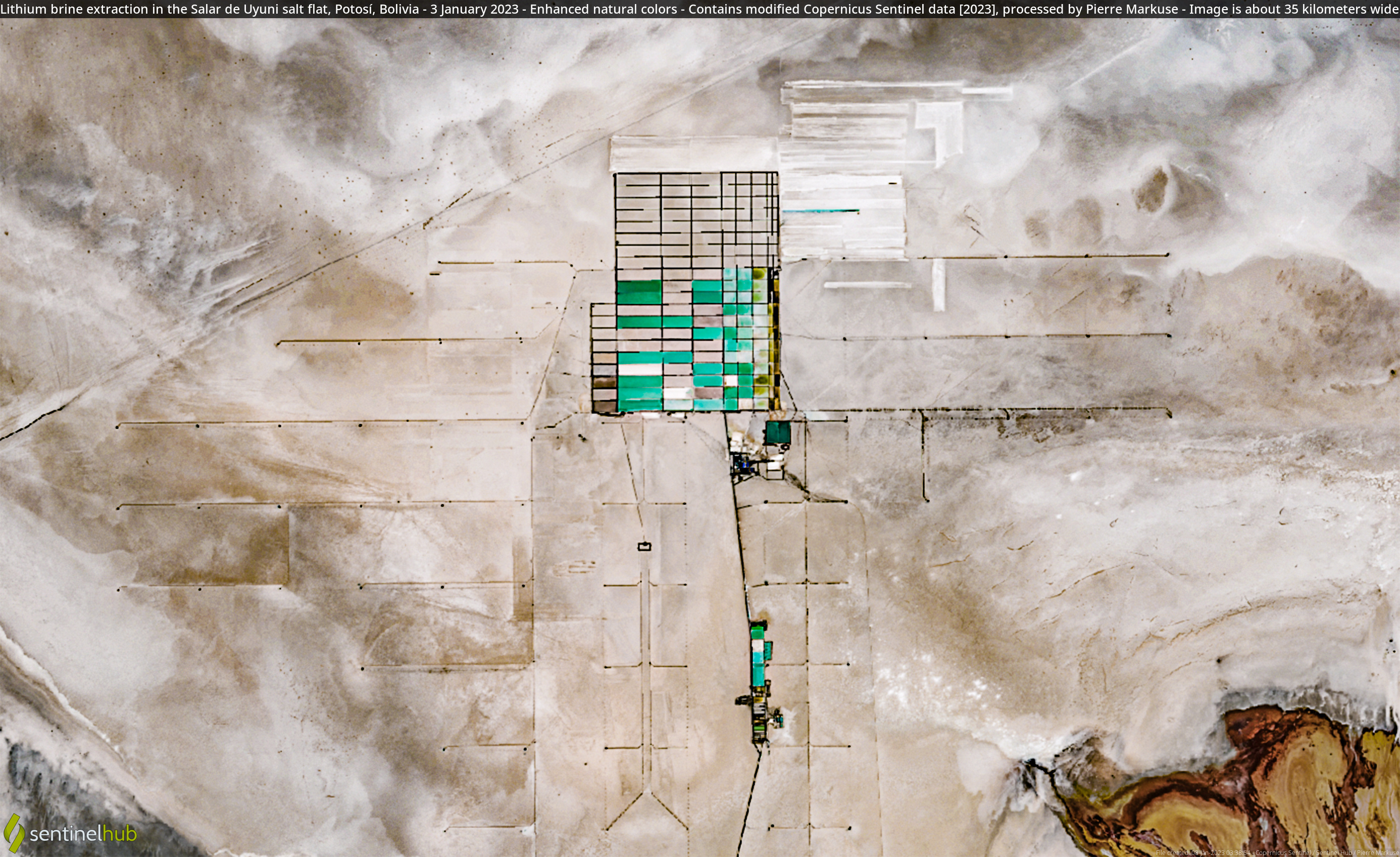
Lithium brine extraction in the Salar de Uyuni

Lithium is concentrated in the brine under the salt crust at a relatively high concentration of about 0.3%. It is also present in the top layers of the porous halite body lying under the brine; however, the liquid brine is easier to extract by boring into the crust and pumping out the brine. The brine distribution has been monitored by the Landsat satellite and confirmed in ground drilling tests. Following those findings, an American-based international corporation has invested $137 million in developing lithium extraction. However, lithium extraction in the 1980s and 1990s by foreign companies met strong opposition from the local community. Locals believed that the money infused by mining would not reach them. The lithium in the salt flats contains more impurities, and the wet climate and high altitude make it harder to process.

No mining plant is currently at the site, and the Bolivian government does not want to allow exploitation by foreign corporations. Instead, it intends to reach an annual production of 35,000 t by 2023 in a joint venture with ACI Systems Alemania GmbH.

Salar de Uyuni is estimated to contain 10 billion tonnes (9.8 billion long tons; 11 billion short tons) of salt, of which less than 25,000 t is extracted annually. All miners working in the Salar belong to Colchani's cooperative. Because of its location, large area, and flatness, the Salar is a major car transport route across the Bolivian Altiplano, except when seasonally covered with water.

== Tourism ==
=== Hotels ===
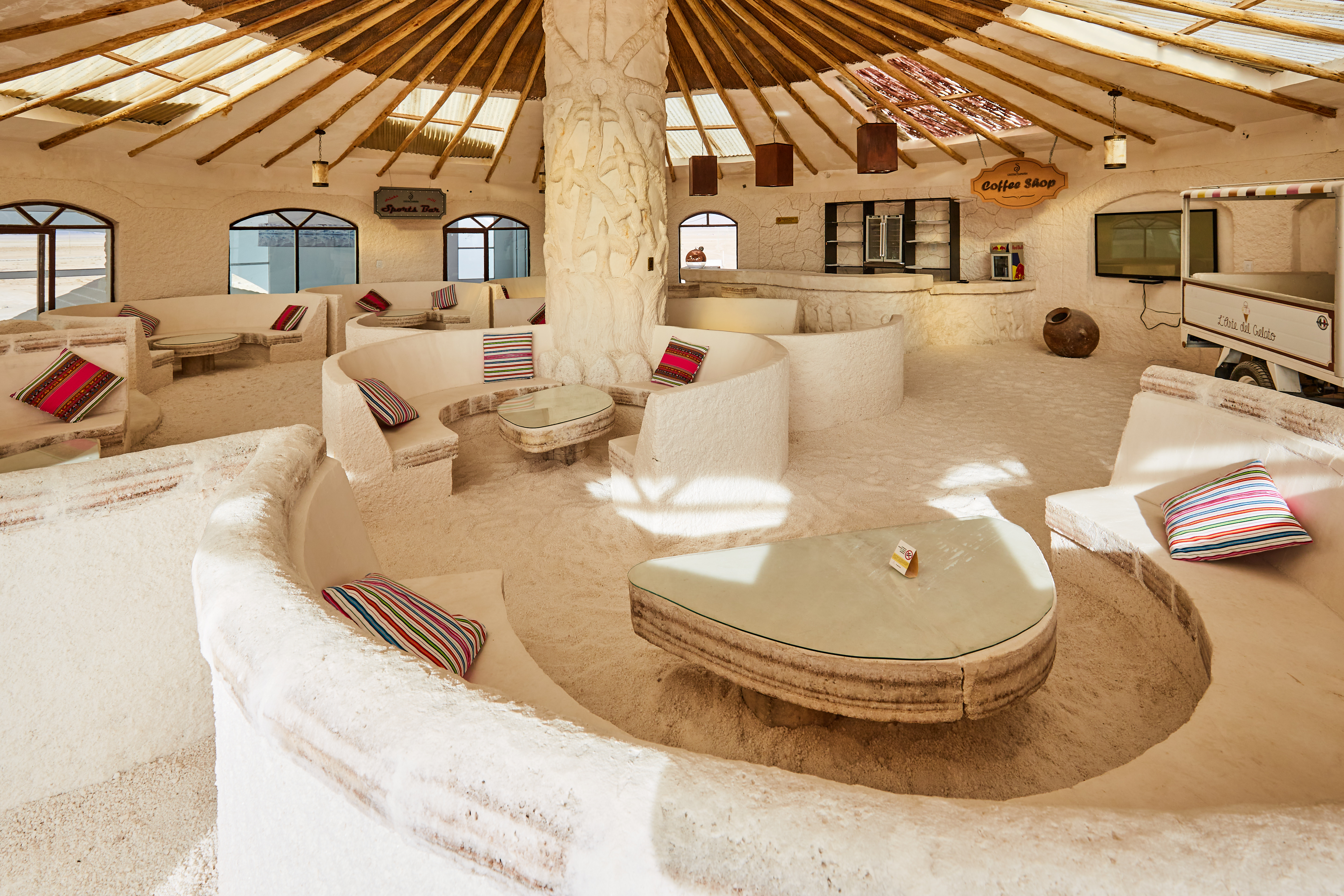
A hotel in the Salar de Uyuni, built from salt blocks

Salar de Uyuni is a popular tourist destination, and consequently, a number of hotels have been built in the area. Due to a lack of conventional construction materials, many of them are almost entirely (walls, roof, furniture) built with salt blocks cut from the Salar. The first such hotel, named Palacio de Sal, was erected in 1993–1995 in the middle of the salt flat, and soon became a popular tourist destination. However, its location in the center of a desert caused sanitation problems, as most waste had to be collected manually. Mismanagement caused serious environmental pollution, and the hotel had to be dismantled in 2002.

Around 2007, a new hotel was built, under the name Palacio de Sal, in a new location at the eastern edge of Salar de Uyuni, 25 km away from the town of Uyuni. The sanitary system has been restructured to comply with the government regulations. The hotel has a dry sauna and a steam room, a saltwater pool, and whirlpool baths.

=== Train cemetery ===
One major tourist attraction is an antique train cemetery. It is 3 km (1.9 miles) outside Uyuni and is connected to it by the old train tracks. The town served in the past as a distribution hub for the trains carrying minerals en route to Pacific Ocean ports. The rail lines were built by British engineers arriving near the end of the 19th century and formed a sizeable community in Uyuni. The engineers were invited by the British-sponsored Antofagasta and Bolivia Railway Companies, now Ferrocarril de Antofagasta a Bolivia. The rail construction started in 1888 and ended in 1892. It was encouraged by Bolivian President Aniceto Arce, who believed Bolivia would flourish with a good transport system. Still, it was constantly interrupted by the local Aymara indigenous Indians, who saw it as an intrusion into their lives. The mining companies mostly used the trains. In the 1940s, the mining industry collapsed, partly because of mineral depletion. Many trains were abandoned, producing the train cemetery. There are proposals to build a museum in the cemetery.

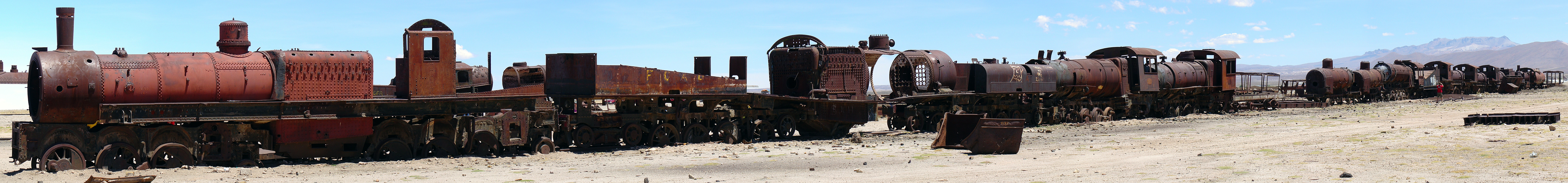
Cemetery of trains near the town of Uyuni

=== Incidents ===
Multiple fatal incidents have occurred at the salt flat as a result of poorly maintained vehicles, untrained drivers, speeding, disregard for the inhospitable conditions, and a lack of regulation for tour companies. A total of 16 reported accidents have happened, with 30+ deaths in total.

== Satellite calibration ==
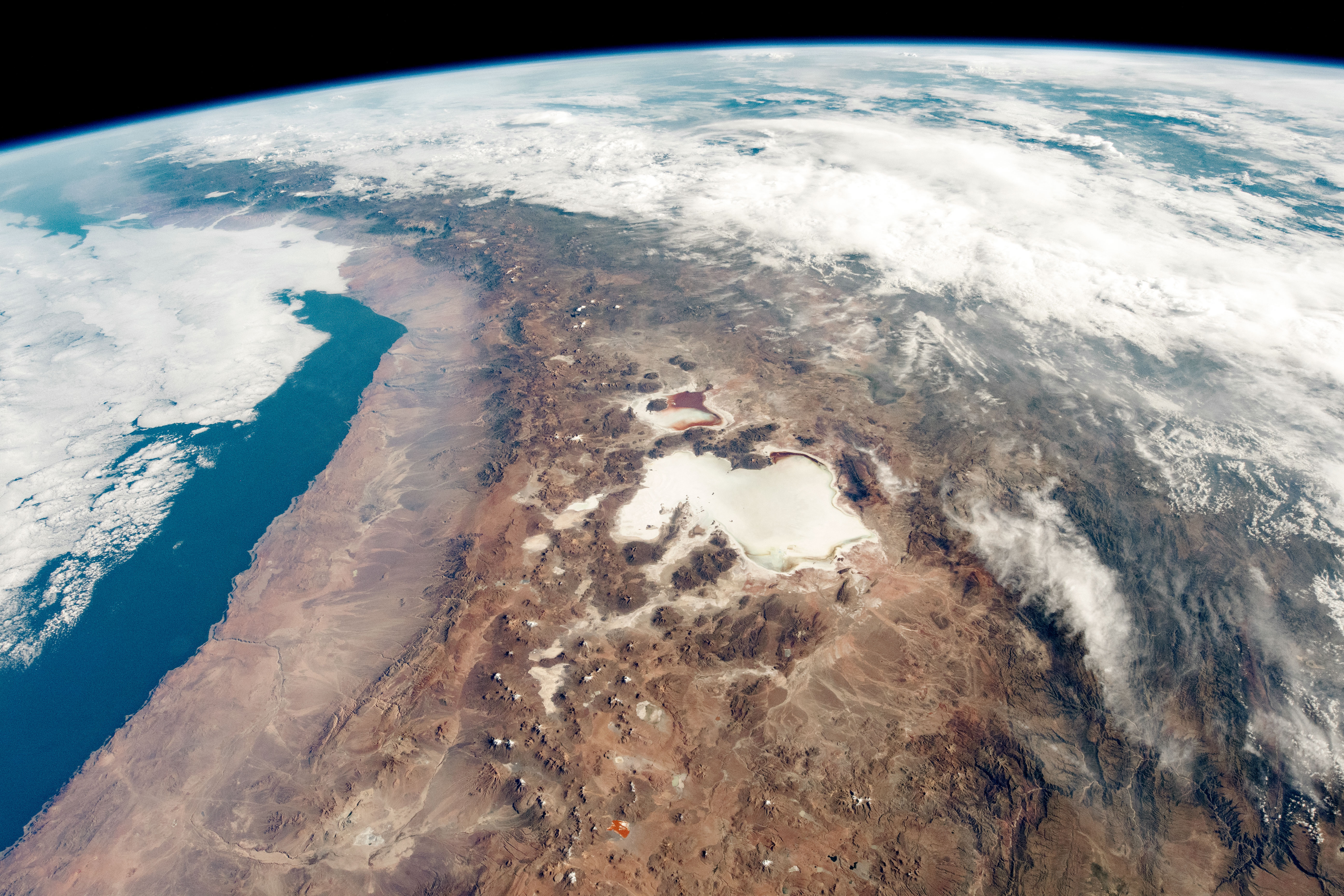
Satellite view of the Salar de Uyuni, located at the center of the image, captured from the International Space Station.

As the largest salt flat on Earth, the Salar de Uyuni is widely regarded as one of the most effective natural calibration sites for Earth-observing satellites.

Its exceptionally high albedo, which reflects the majority of incoming sunlight, together with its vast, uniform terrain, makes it uniquely well-suited for remote sensing applications. Located at an altitude of 3,650 metres (11,975 ft) above sea level, the salar offers stable emissivity and minimal radio frequency interference, providing space‐agencies and remote sensing scientists with ideal conditions for calibrating both radar and optical sensors. Across its 10,582-square-kilometer (4,086 sq mi) surface, the elevation variation is less than 1 meter (3 ft 3 in) relative to the Earth's circumference. Collectively, these features make the Salar de Uyuni approximately five times more effective for satellite calibration than the surface of the open ocean.

In September 2002, NASA's ICESat-2 mission conducted extensive GPS surveys over the salar to support the calibration of its laser altimeters and improve their capability to produce ground‐truth digital elevation models with centimeter‐level (3/8 inch) accuracy. Similar missions have been conducted over the Salar de Uyuni for radiometric calibration, where the Landsat-5 satellite's Thematic Mapper (TM) was calibrated “in-flight” by using the salar as a radiometrically stable target, particularly in the visible and near-infrared bands.

In April 2014, the European Space Agency’s (ESA) Sentinel‑1A satellite surveyed the salar a few weeks after its launch as part of the Copernicus programme. The mission focused on calibrating radar-based measurements of surface topography. In 2010, ESA launched the CryoSat-2 mission to monitor variations in polar ice thickness and global sea levels. As part of its validation strategy, CryoSat-2 has relied on the salar, where its Interferometric synthetic-aperture radars (InSAR) capabilities were reinstated to enhance the precision of altimetric observations. In February 2024, the Copernicus Sentinel-3B mission conducted calibration activities over the salar for its Synthetic Aperture Radar Altimeter (SRAL).

== Flora and fauna ==
The Salar is virtually devoid of any wildlife or vegetation. The latter is dominated by giant cacti (Echinopsis atacamensis pasacana, Echinopsis tarijensis, etc.). They grow at a rate of about 1 cm/a to a height of about 12 m (39 ft). Other shrubs include Pilaya, which locals use to cure catarrh, and Thola (Baccharis dracunculifolia), which is burned as a fuel. Also present are quinoa plants and queñua bushes.

Every November, Salar de Uyuni is the breeding ground for three South American species of flamingo feeding on local brine shrimps: the Chilean, Andean, and rare James's flamingos. About 80 other bird species are present, including the horned coot, Andean goose, and Andean hillstar. The Andean fox, or culpeo, is also present, and islands in the Salar (in particular Incahuasi Island) host colonies of rabbit-like viscachas.

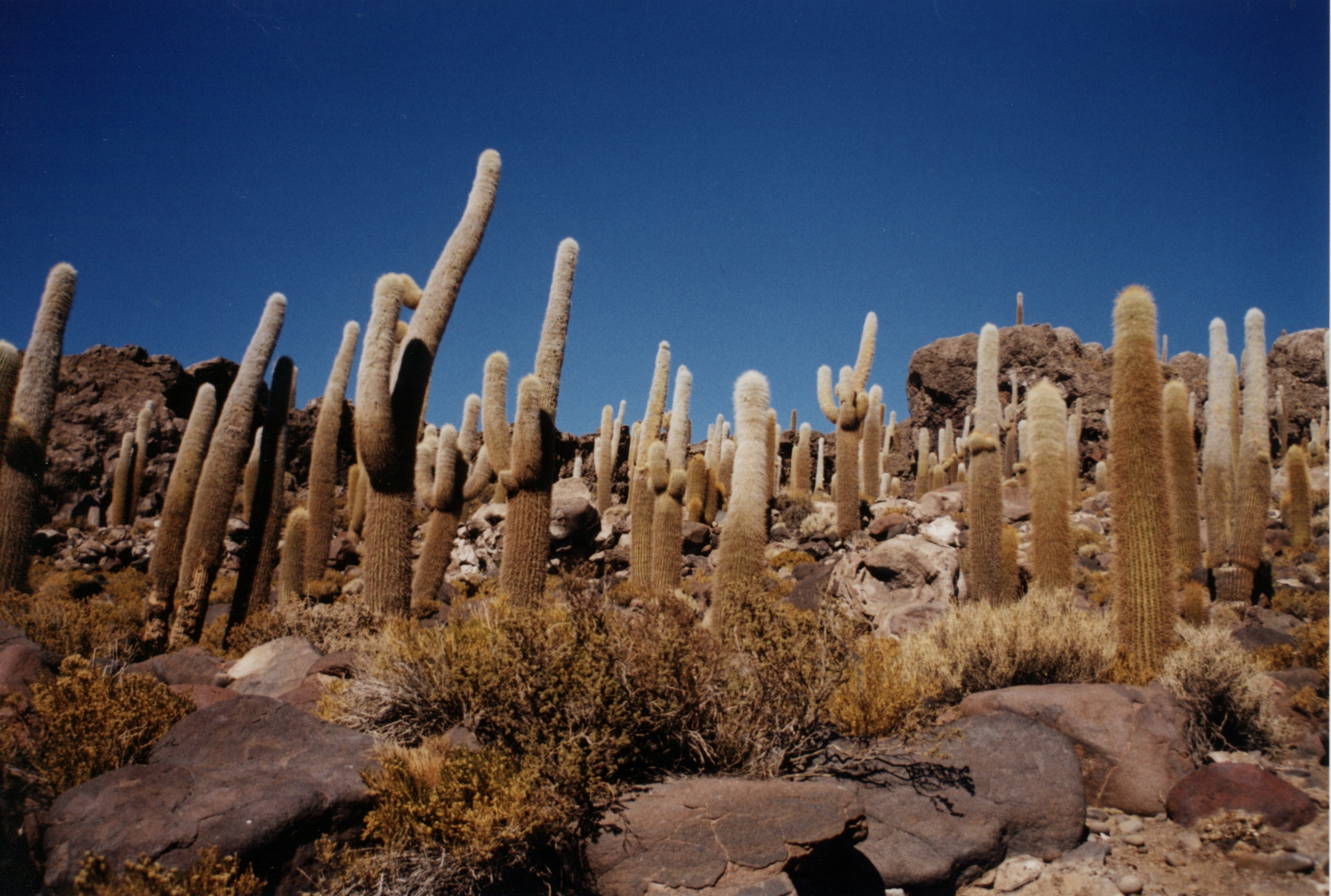
A part of Incahuasi Island inside the Salar, featuring giant cacti

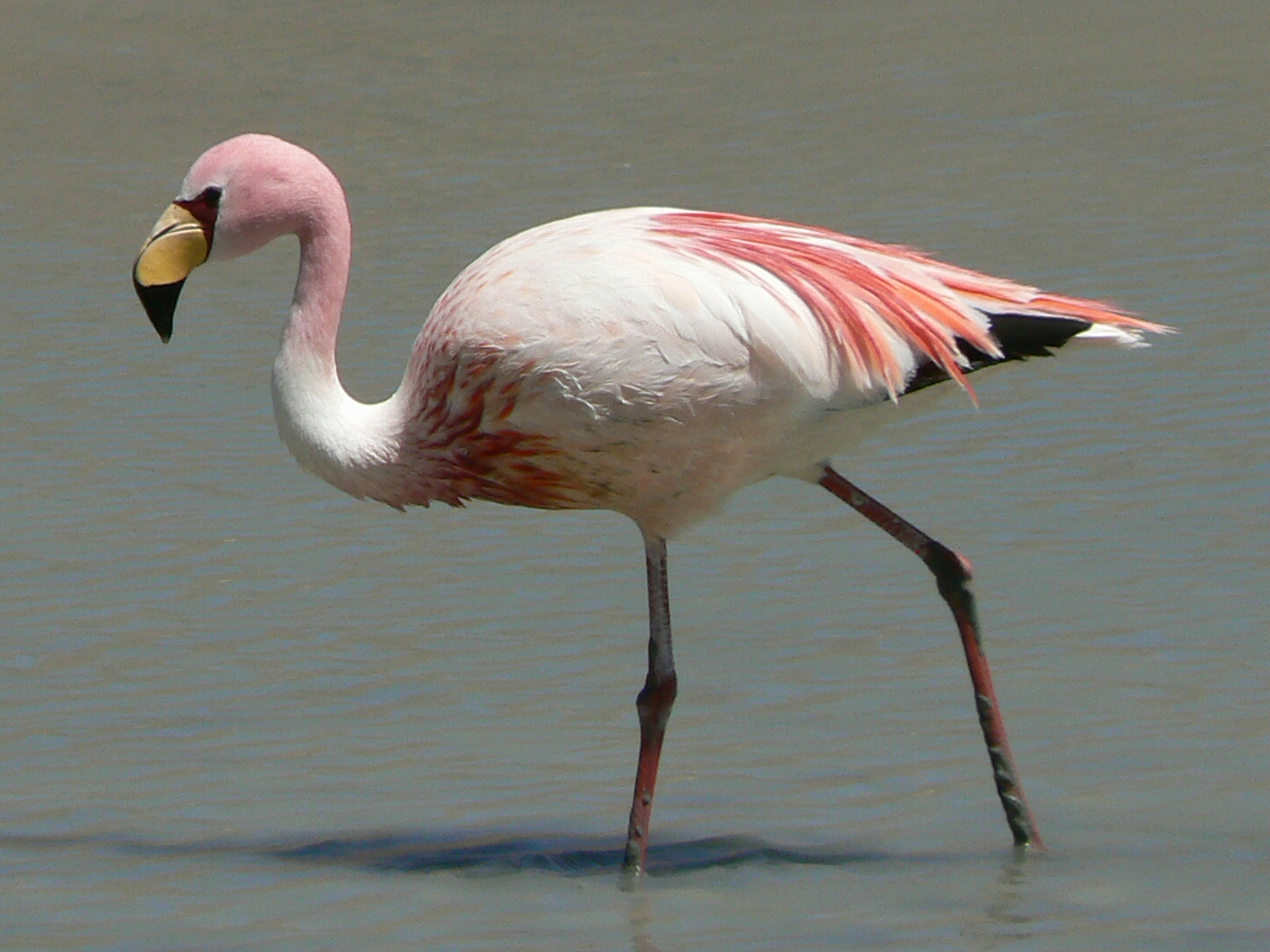
James's flamingo

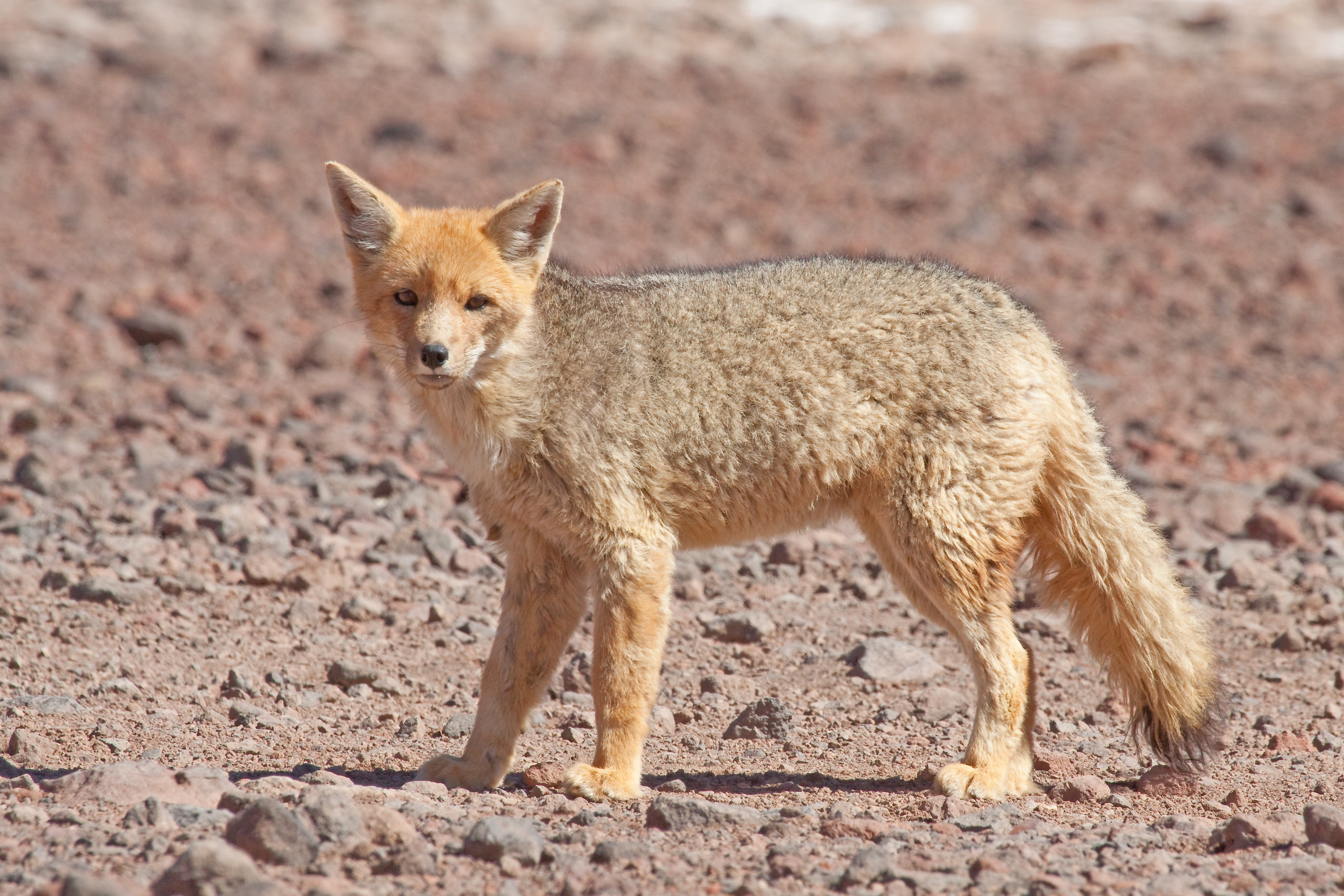
Culpeo

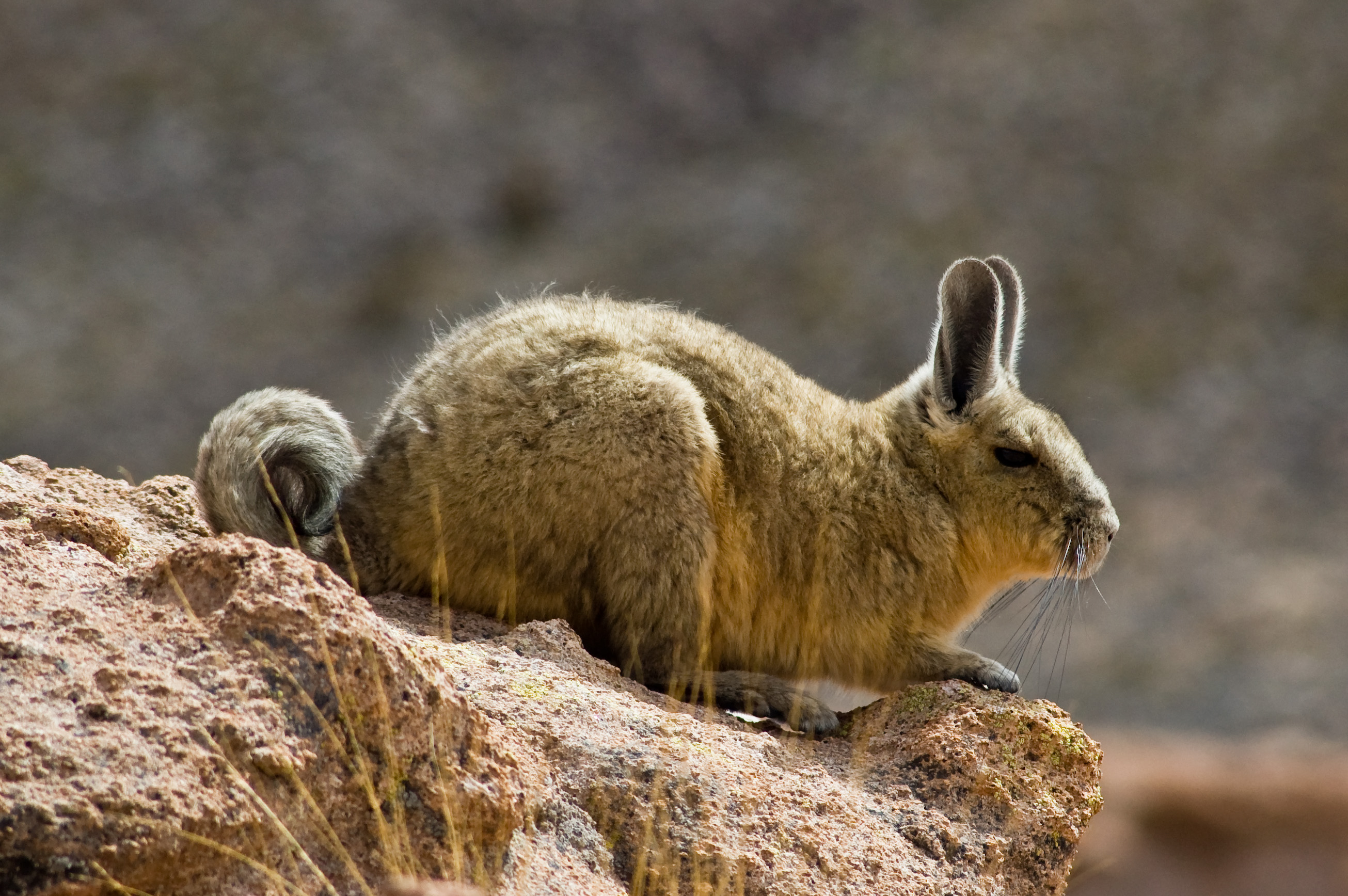
Bolivian vizcacha

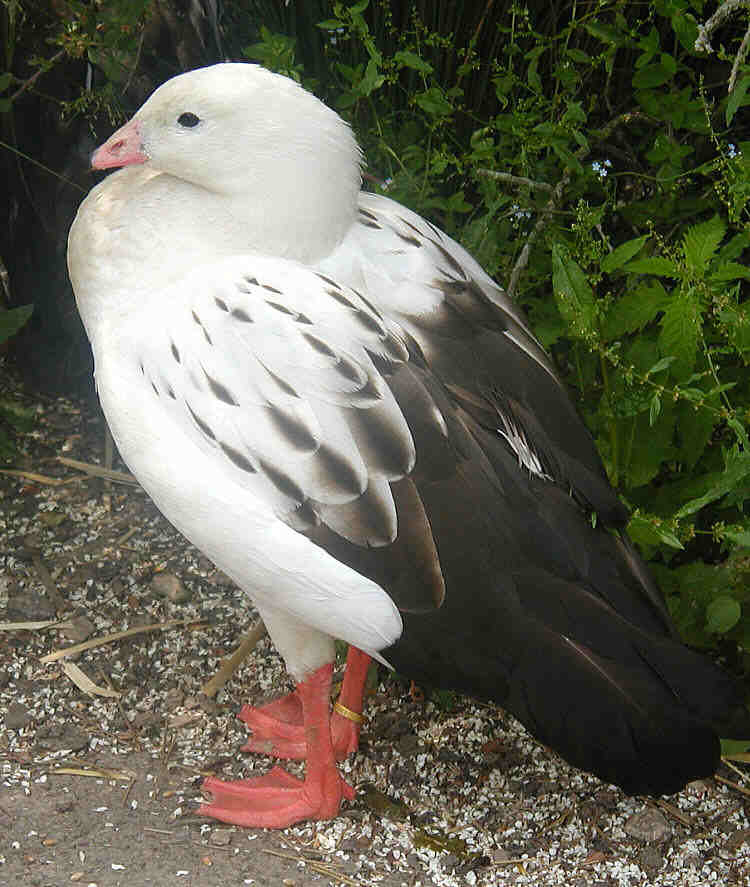
Andean goose

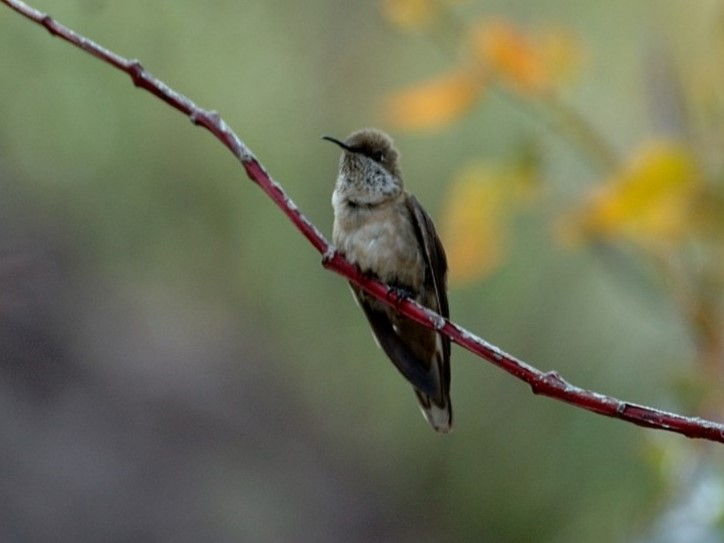
Andean hillstar

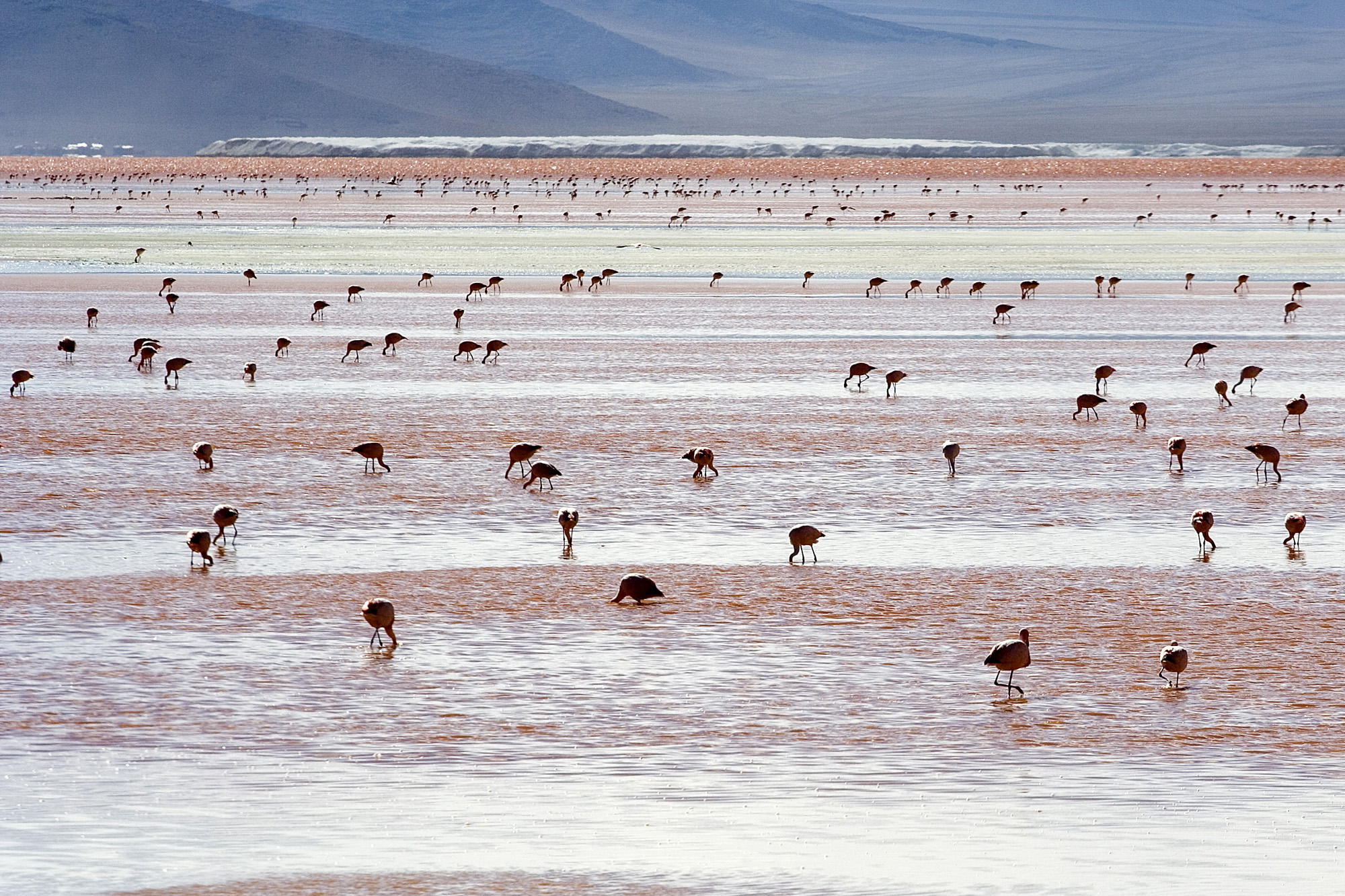
Andean flamingos in the Laguna Colorada, south of the Salar

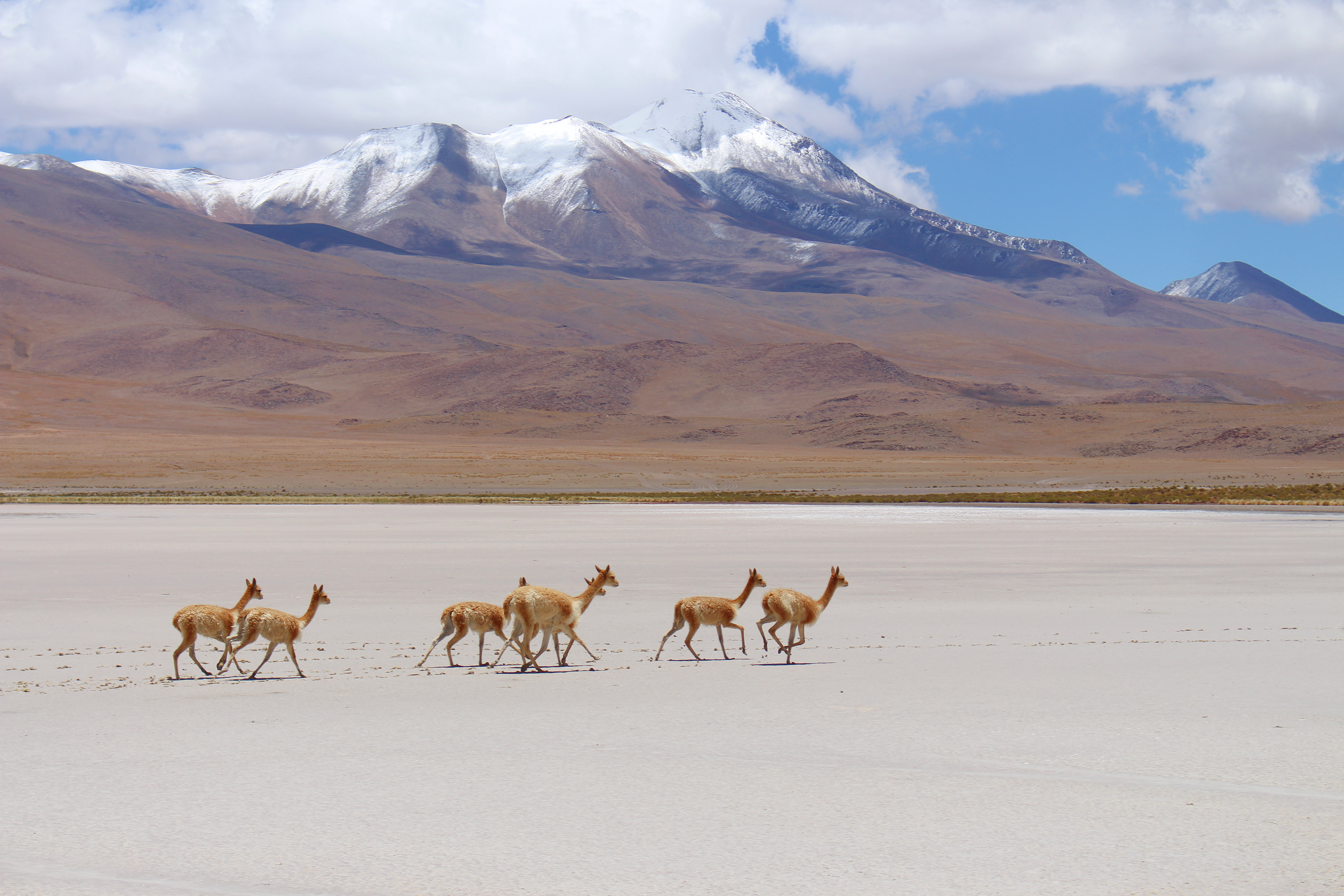
Vicuñas near the Salar De Uyuni 2017

== Gallery ==
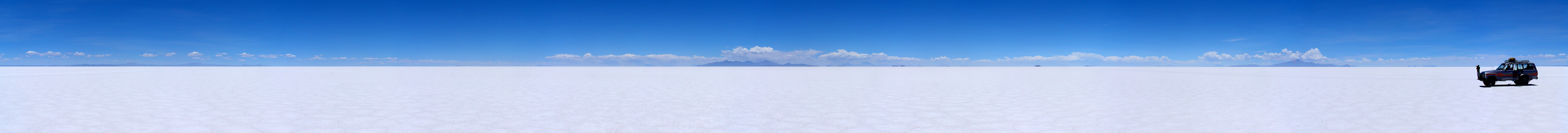
Panoramic view of the Salar.
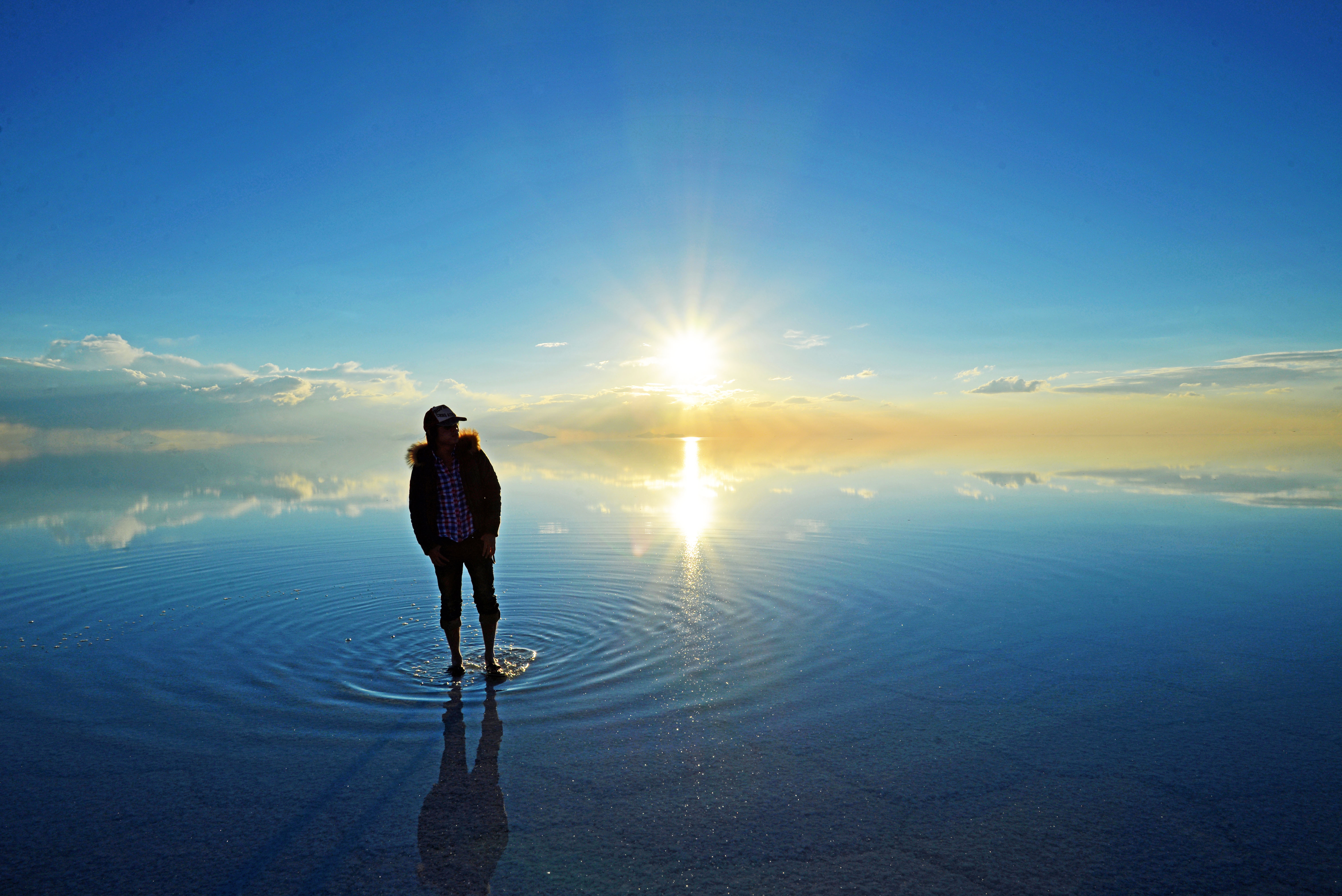
Salar de Uyuni 2013

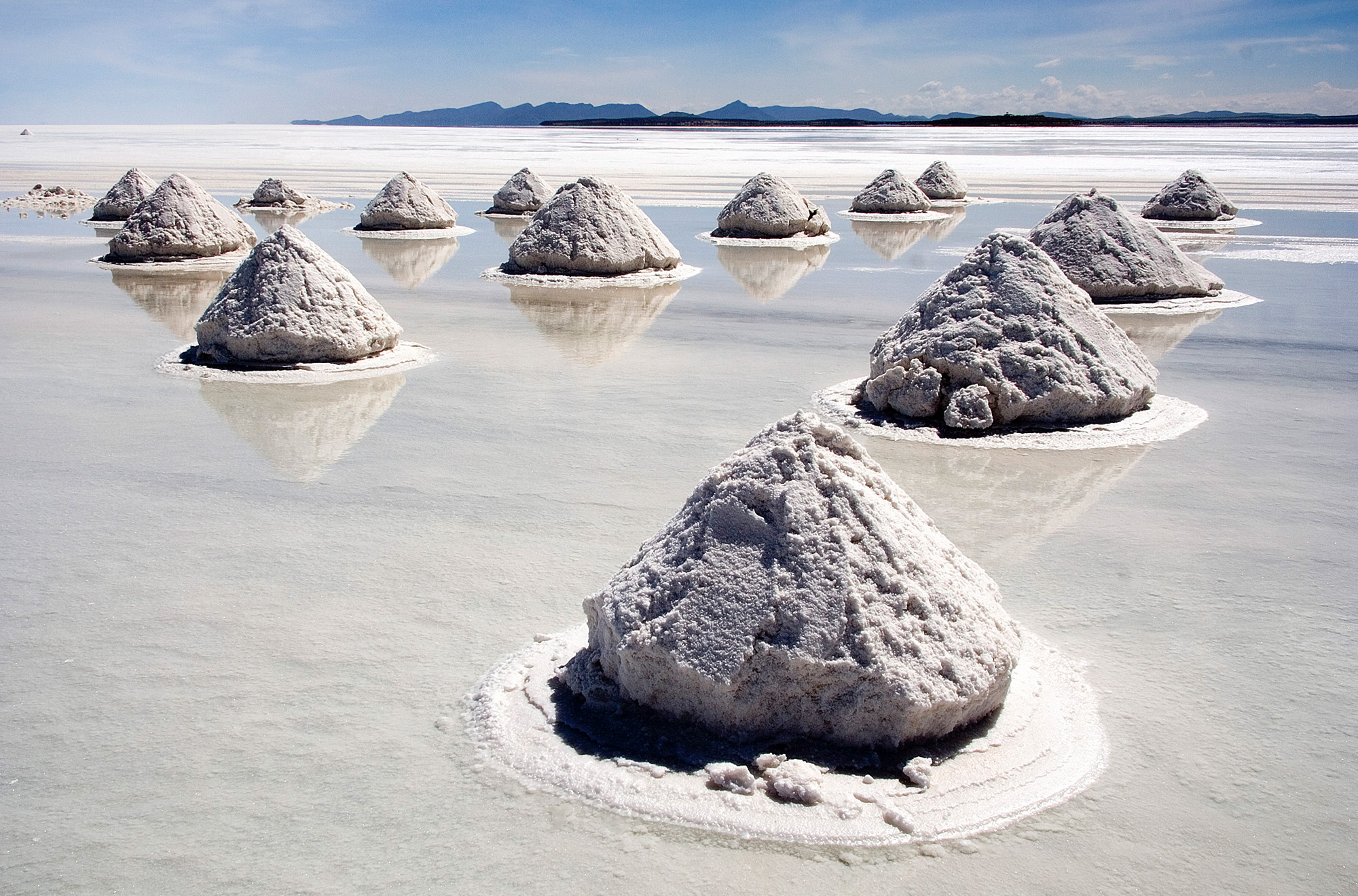
Piles of salt at the Salar

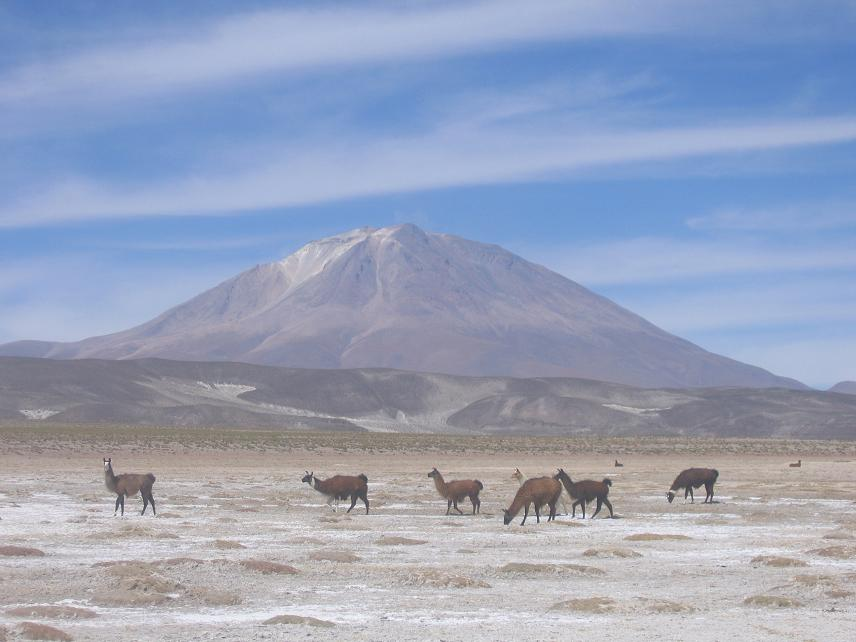
Llamas in the Salar

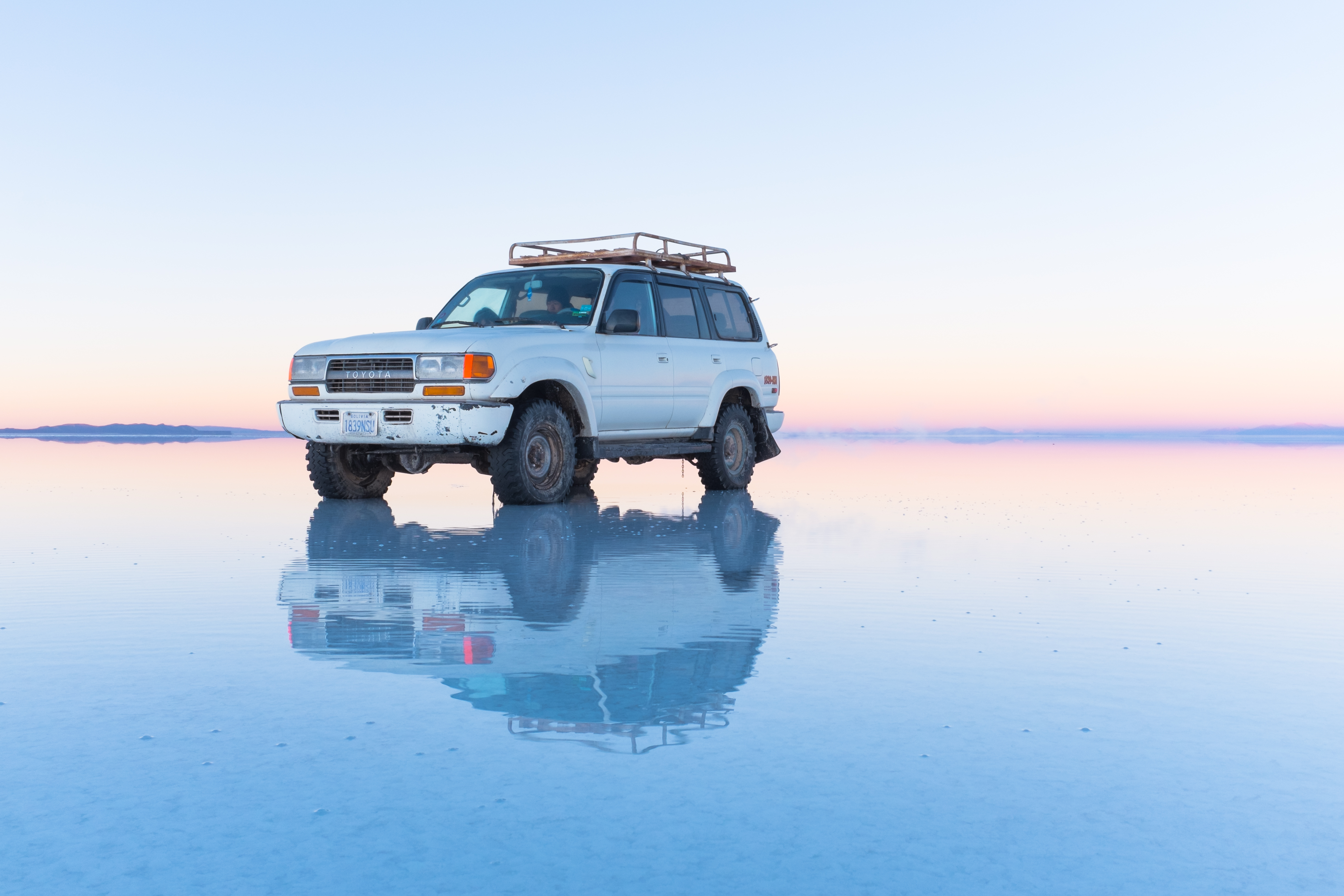
Reflection on the Salar de Uyuni

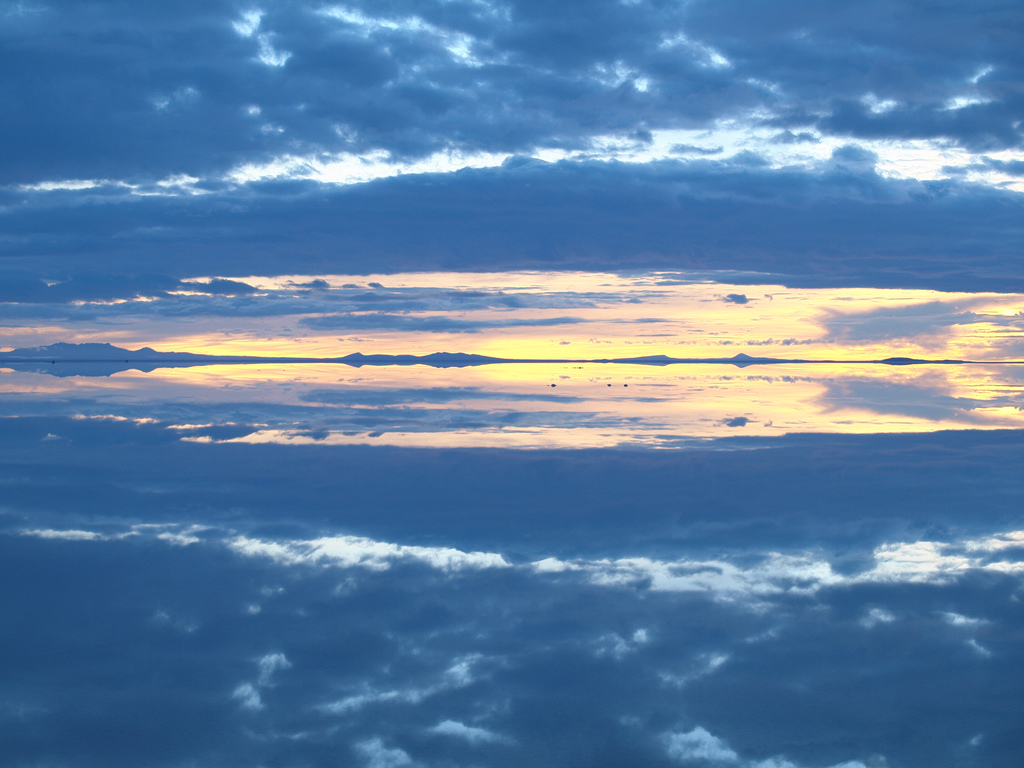
Sky reflections at sunset

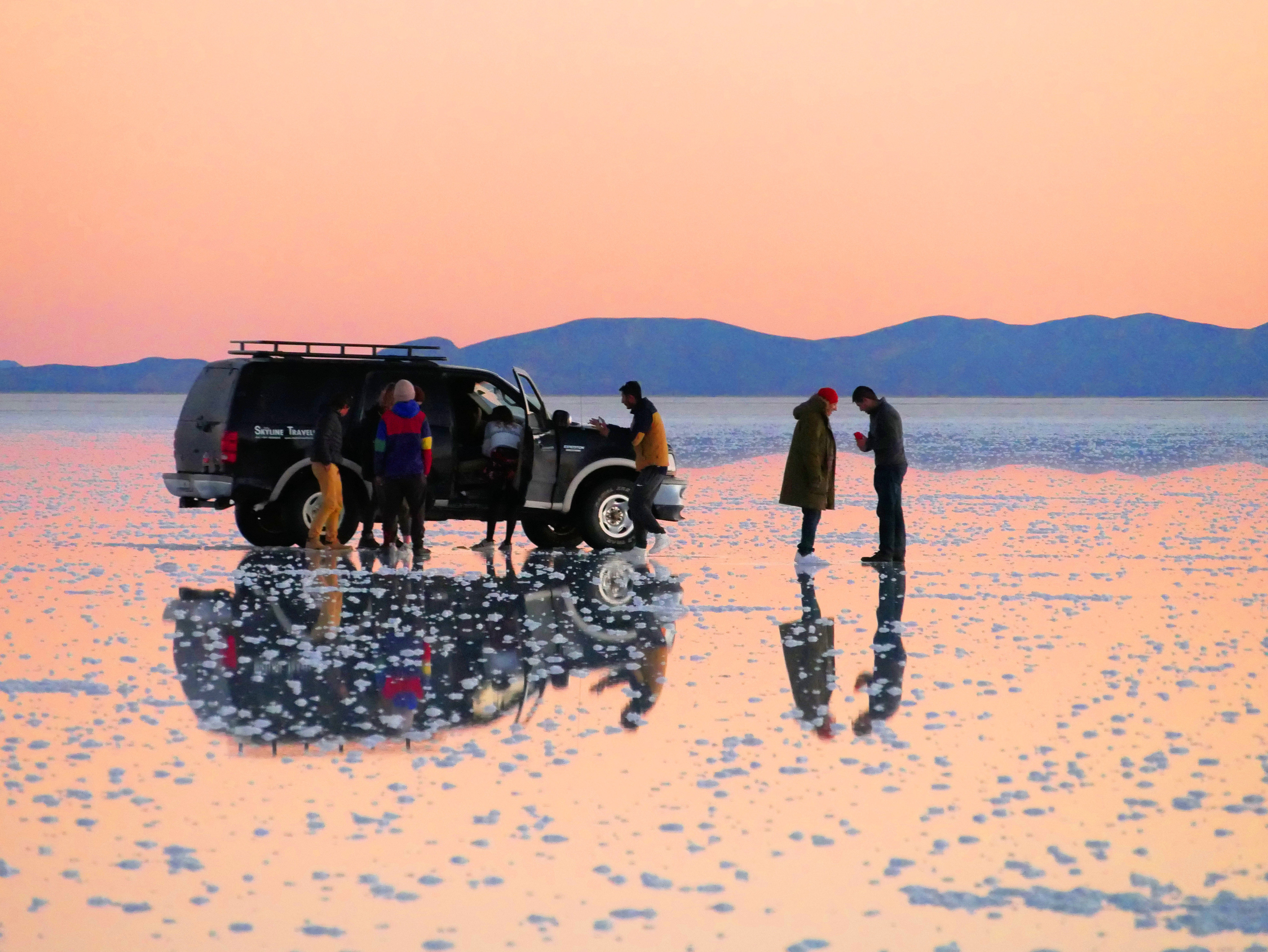
In the Salar de Uyuni

== See also ==
- Ouki
- Puka Mayu
- Great Salt Lake
- Rann of Kutch
