= Train graveyard =

Railway scrapyard

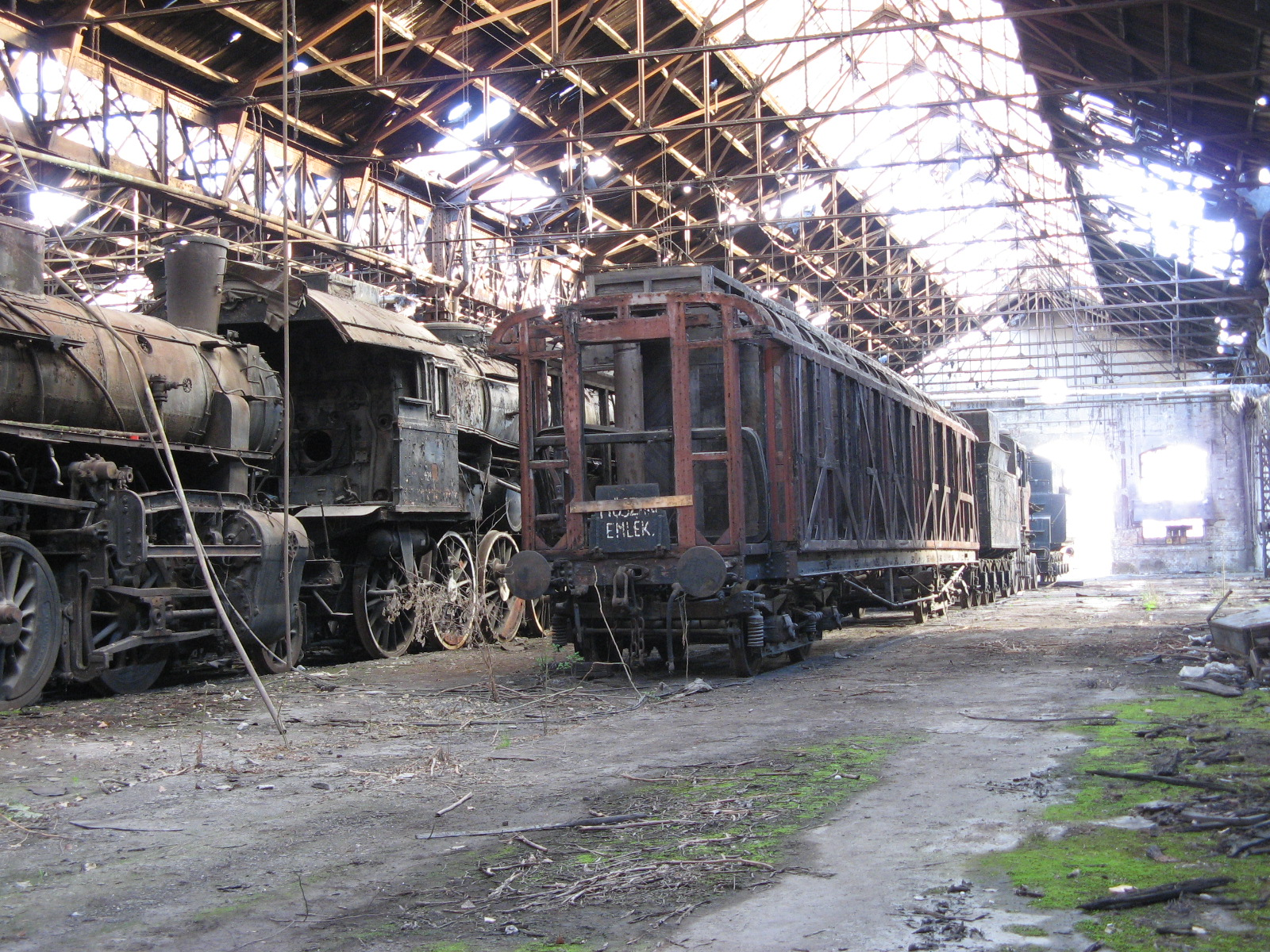
Abandoned trains in Hungary

A train graveyard (or cemetery) is where trains and rolling stock are discarded while awaiting collection, recycling, or destruction. They might be abandoned and left to decay. The term can also be used to include trams. Such vehicle graveyards are distinguished from an abandoned railway, which is a railway line that is no longer used for that purpose, and abandoned railway stations which are similarly disused. Some train graveyards attract visitors and can be a source of tourism, while others have had a role in preserving the history of the railways.

== Locations ==
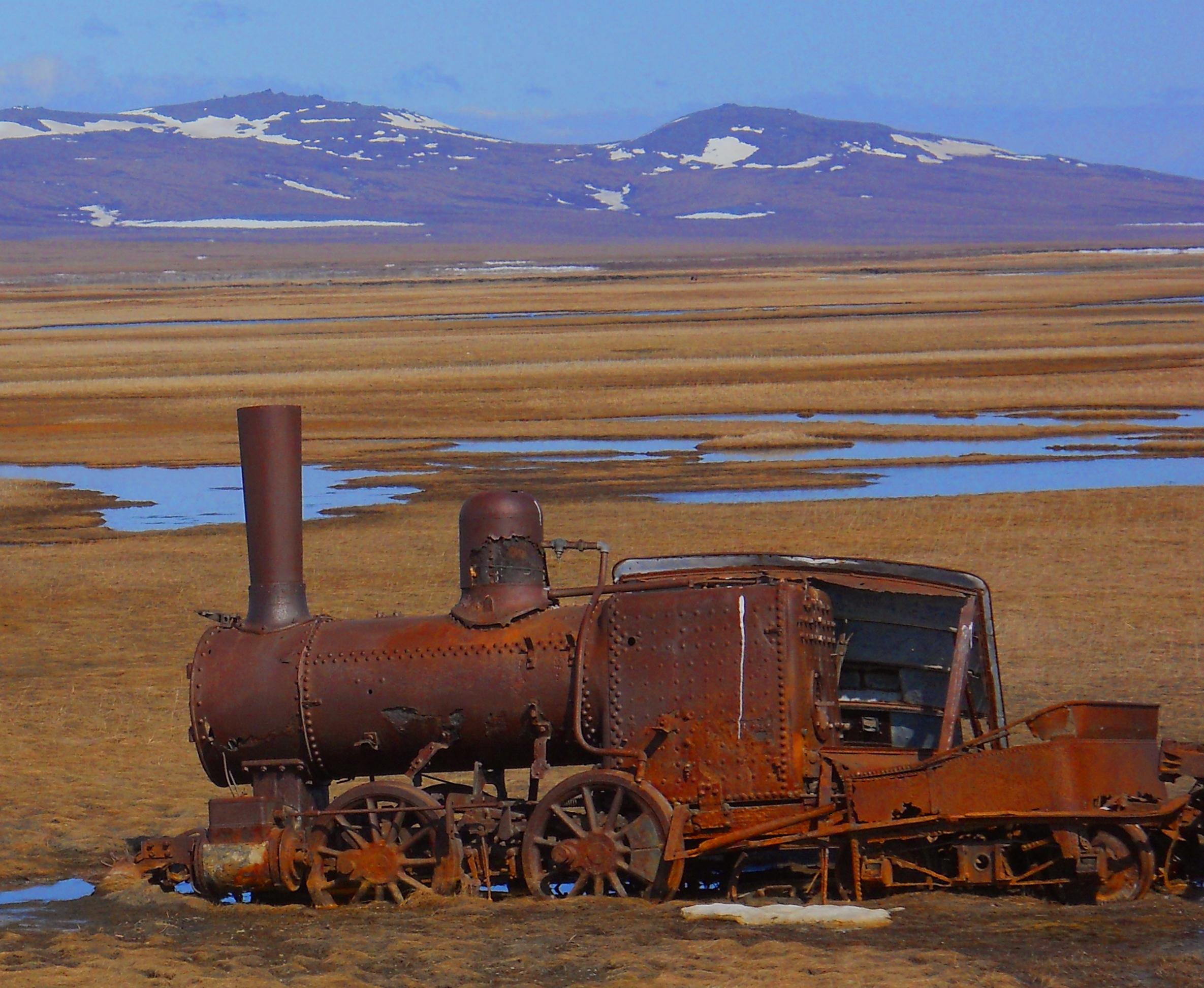
Former New York City transit locomotive, abandoned in Alaska

Some sites contain numerous trains that have been abandoned. In the United States, just outside Watervliet, New York, there is the main line for the Delaware and Hudson Railway. Alongside this railway line is a disused stretch of track which is home to rusted locomotives, passenger cars, and freight cars. Istvántelki Főműhely, formerly one of the most important railway repair workshops in Hungary, now lays disused with old rolling stock on site. Many of them were taken there to be repaired before being exhibited in the Hungarian Railway History Park in Budapest but never made it. One particularly sizable site is the Woodham Brothers scrapyard in Barry, Wales, from which 213 of 297 locomotives were rescued by the nascent railway preservation movement. In Russia, there is one in Shumkovo. In Tangshan in north China there are rusting locomotives on the sidings of now shut-down coal mines. A few have also been moved and exhibited in a Coal Mining Park and Railway museum.

Trains can be abandoned in a location because it is deemed too difficult to move them. Two large steam locomotives of the Eagle Lake and West Branch Railroad, for example, were left in a woodland area in the U.S. state of Maine after the end of a local logging operation because it was not practical to move them from such a remote location.

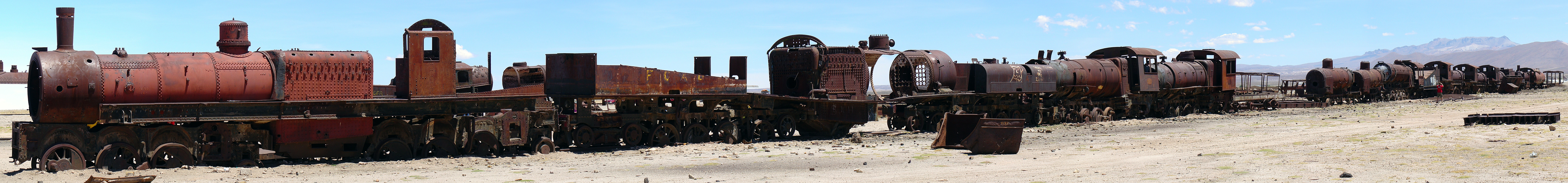
"Cementerio de Trenes" (train cemetery) in Bolivia

Train graveyards can be of interest to railfans, urban explorers, and other tourists. The "Cementerio de Trenes" ("train cemetery") near Uyuni, Bolivia, serves as a tourist attraction with trains dating back to the 19th century left to rust in the extensive salt flats of the Salar de Uyuni. The site contains a train alleged to have been robbed by Butch Cassidy and the Sundance Kid and has been called "one of the most striking and haunting sights in the deserts of southwest Bolivia".

== See also ==
- Category:Railway scrapyards in the United Kingdom
- Reserve fleet
- Aircraft boneyard
