= Yo Ho =

Yo Ho may refer to:

- Yo Ho (A Pirate's Life for Me), the theme song of the Pirates of the Caribbean attractions at Disney theme parks
- USS Yo Ho (SP-463), a patrol vessel that served in the United States Navy from 1917 to 1919.

== See also ==
- Yoho (disambiguation)
