= UYU =

UYU may refer to:

- Uruguayan peso, the currency of Uruguay (ISO 4217 code)
- Uyuni Airport, southwestern Bolivia (IATA code: UYU)
- Uyu River, northern Myanmar
