= Shumkovo =

Shumkovo (Russian: Шумково) is the name of several rural localities in Russia:

- Shumkovo, Alexandrovsky District, Perm Krai, a village in Alexandrovsky District, Perm Krai
- Shumkovo, Beryozovsky District, Perm Krai, a village in Beryozovsky District, Perm Krai
