= USS Patrol No. 7 =

Patrol vessel of the United States Navy

History

United States
- Name: USS Patrol No. 7
- Builder: Frederick S. Nock, East Greenwich, Rhode Island
- Completed: 1916
- Acquired: 1 May 1917
- Commissioned: 19 May 1917
- Fate: Sank 14 June 1919; Refloated 21 July 1919; Sold 11 October 1919

General characteristics
- Type: Patrol vessel
- Length: 39 ft 10 in (12.14 m)
- Beam: 8 ft 4 in (2.54 m)
- Draft: 3 ft 0 in (0.91 m)
- Speed: 28 knots
- Complement: 6
- Armament: 1 × machine gun

USS Patrol No. 7 (SP-31), often rendered as USS Patrol #7, was an armed motorboat that served in the United States Navy as a patrol vessel from 1917 to 1919.

Patrol No. 7 was built as a private motorboat in 1916 by Frederick S. Nock at East Greenwich, Rhode Island. The U.S. Navy purchased her from J. Phillip Hart of Marion, Massachusetts on 1 May 1917 and commissioned her for service in World War I as USS Patrol No. 7 (SP-31) on 19 May 1917.

Patrol No. 7 operated in the 2nd Naval District, headquartered at Newport, Rhode Island, on patrol throughout the United States' participation in World War I.

On 14 June 1919, Patrol No. 7 was under tow by submarine chaser USS SC-241 and tied to patrol vessel USS Yo Ho (SP-463) when she sank between Scituate, Massachusetts, and Minot's Ledge, about 15 nautical miles (28 kilometers) southeast of the Boston Light Vessel. She was refloated on 21 July 1919, surveyed, and sold on 11 October 1919.
