= Yoho =

Yoho or Yo Ho may refer to:

- Yoho Ahoy, British children's television series
- Yoho National Park in British Columbia, Canada
- Yoho Lake in New Brunswick, Canada
- Yoho Mall in Yuen Long, Hong Kong
- Yoho Town in Yuen Long, Hong Kong
- Yo Ho (A Pirate's Life for Me), the theme song for the Pirates of the Caribbean attractions at Disney theme parks
- USS Yo Ho (SP-463), a patrol vessel that served in the United States Navy from 1917 to 1919

== People with the surname ==
- Craig Yoho (born 1999), American baseball player
- Mack Yoho, American football player
- Max Yoho (1934–2017), American novelist
- Monte Yoho, American southern rock and country musician
- Ted Yoho, American politician
