= Wrecking yard =

Place for storage and dismantling of used automobiles

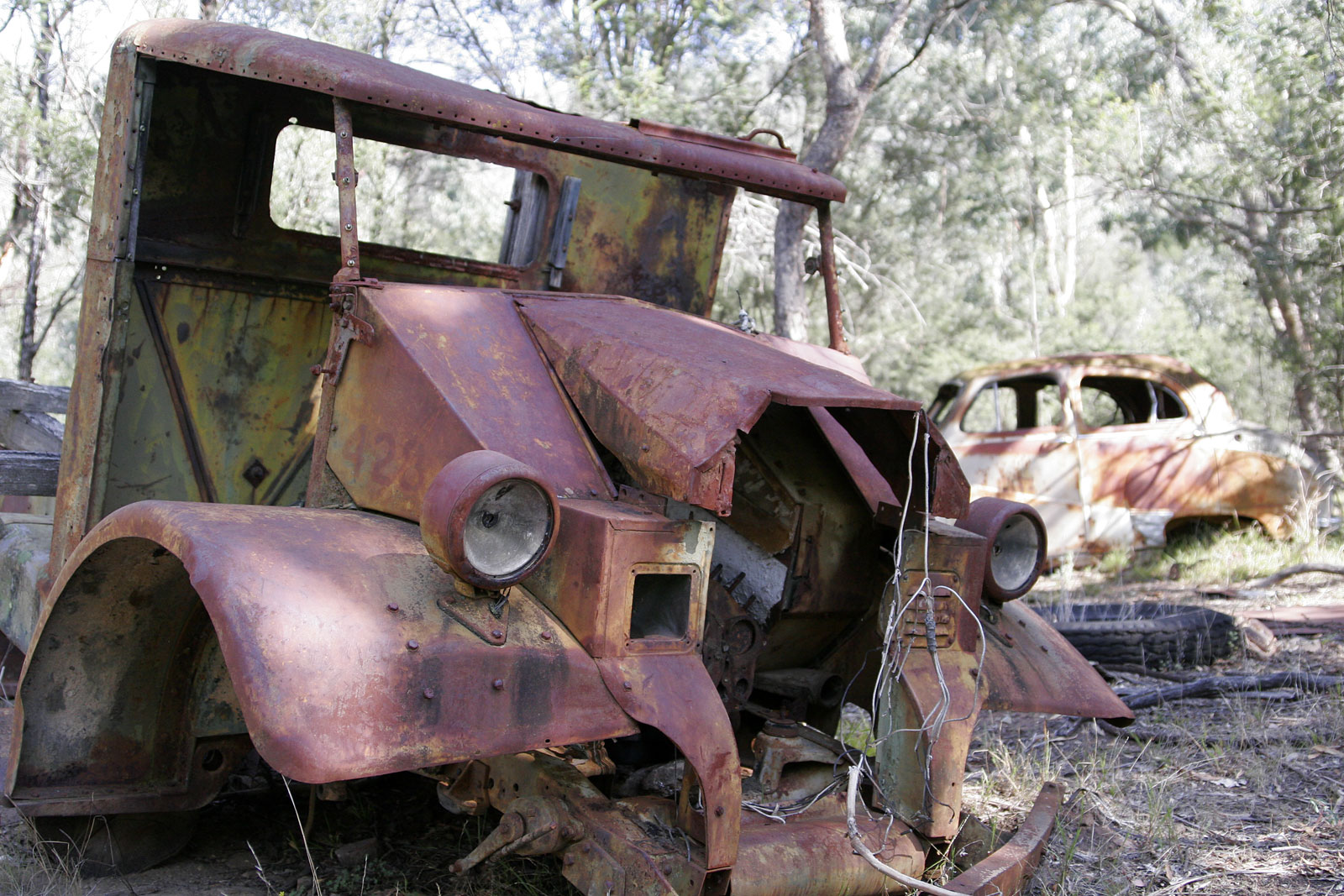
Old vehicles rusting and torn down in a forest

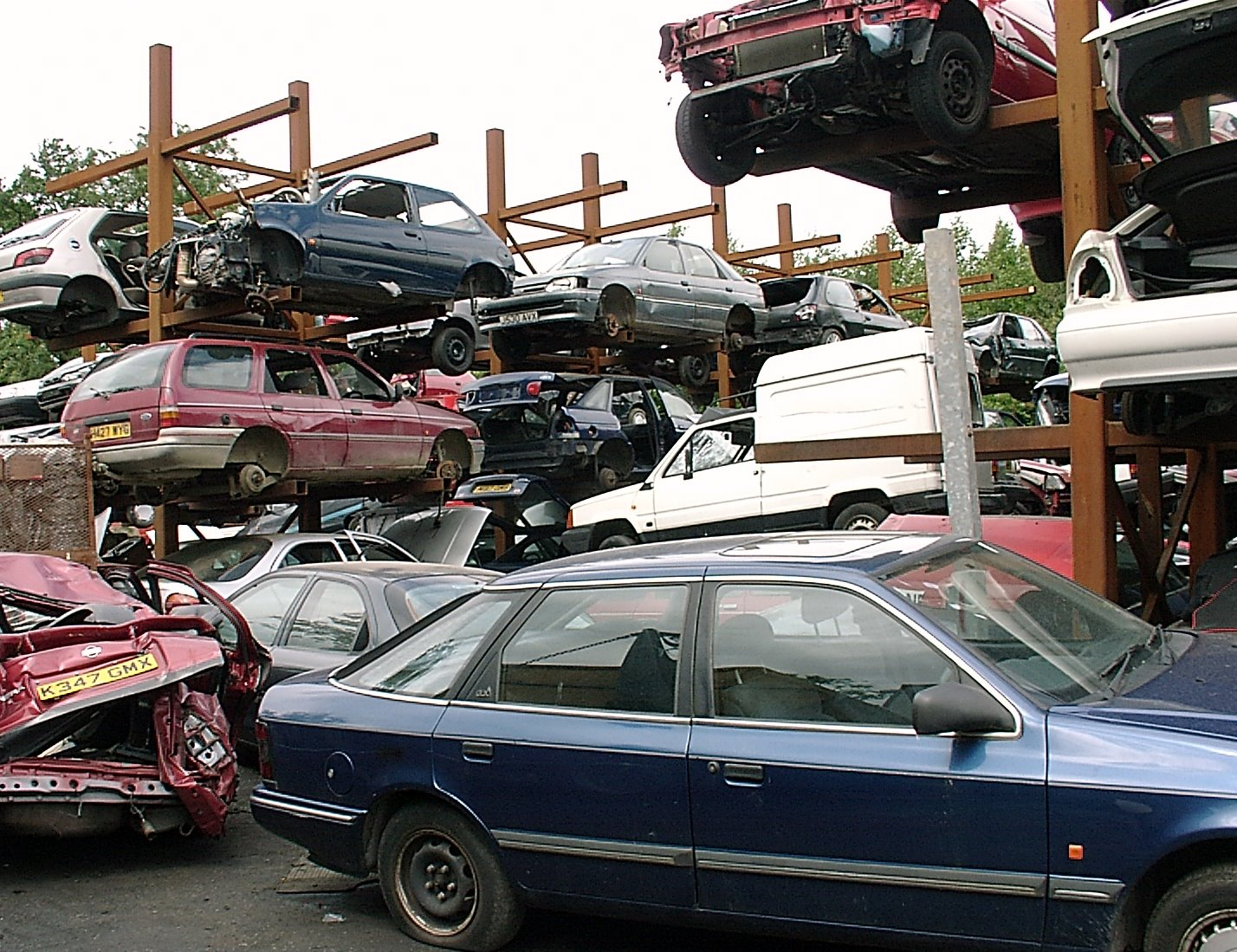
UK breakers yard showing cars stacked on metal racks to make it easier to find and remove reusable parts

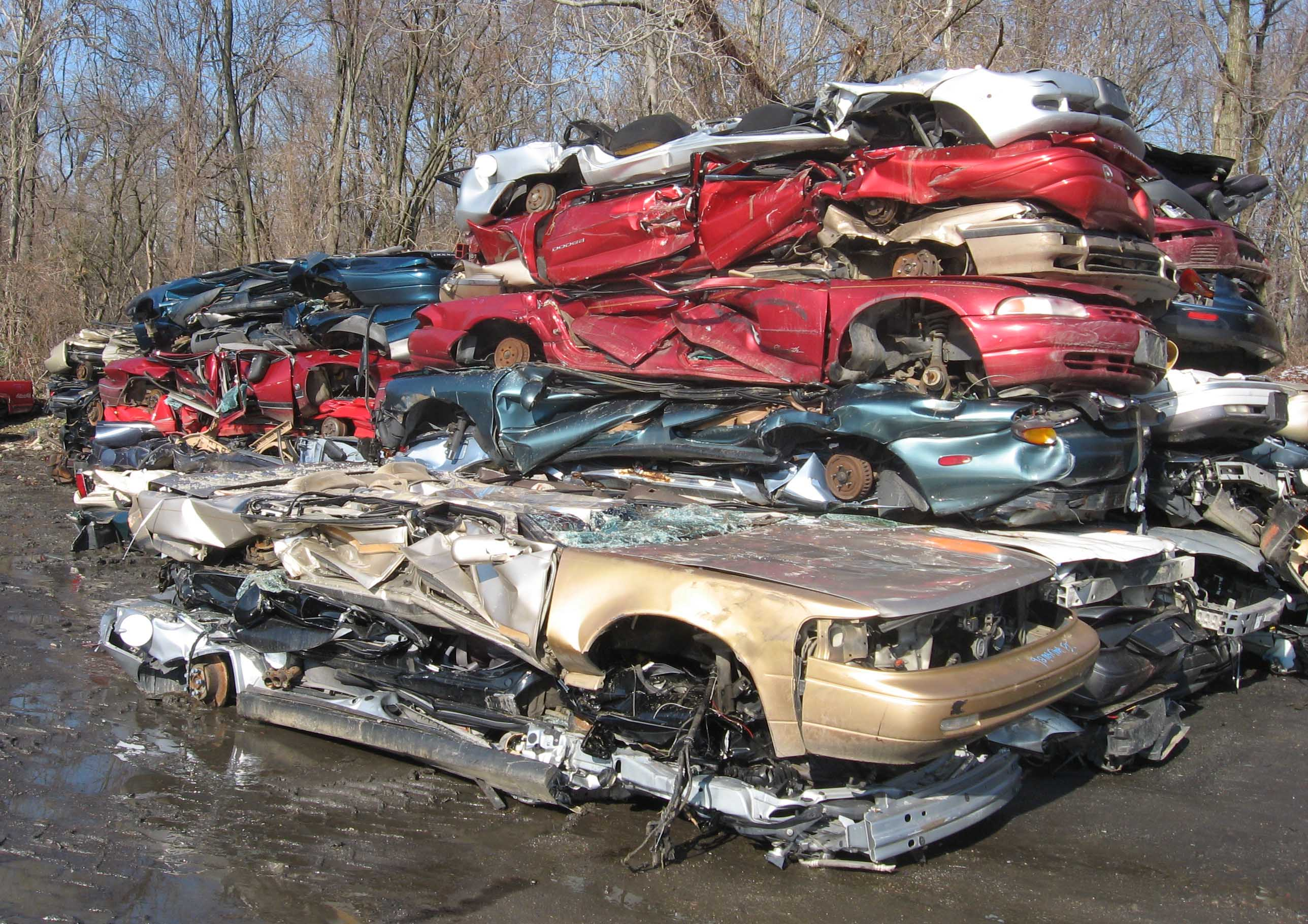
Crushed cars at a scrapyard

A wrecking yard (Australian, New Zealand, and Canadian English) known as a scrapyard (Irish, British, and South African English) or junkyard (American English), is a business that dismantles wrecked or decommissioned vehicles. Its usable parts are sold for vehicle repairs, while unusable metal parts are sold to recycling companies. Other terms include wreck yard, wrecker's yard, salvage yard, breaker's yard, dismantler, and scrapheap. In the UK, Ireland and South Africa, car salvage yards are called car breakers, and motorcycle salvage yards are called bike breakers. In Australia, New Zealand, and Canada, they are often referred to as wreckers.

== Types of wreck yards ==
Automobile wreck yards are the most common type, but junkyards for motorcycles, bicycles, trucks, buses, small airplanes, boats, and trains also exist.

== Scrapyard ==
A scrapyard is a recycling center that buys and sells various types of scrap metal, including iron, steel, stainless steel, brass, copper, aluminum, zinc, nickel, and lead. They may also purchase electronics, appliances, and metal vehicles. Scrapyards sell their metal accumulations to refineries or larger scrap brokers. Metal theft is a common issue, as thieves may steal valuable metals like copper to sell to scrapyards.

== Operation ==
When a vehicle is severely damaged, malfunctioning beyond repair, or not worth fixing, the owner may sell it to a junkyard. In some cases, if a disabled car cannot be left in certain areas, the owner may pay a wrecker to remove it. Salvage yards purchase wrecked, derelict, and abandoned vehicles from auctions, police impound lots, and insurance tow yards.

A salvage yard provides car removal services for disposing of old, non-functional vehicles. Vehicles can be towed or driven to the yard, where they are arranged in rows and stacked. Some yards maintain inventories of usable parts and locations of cars. Many yards use computerized inventory systems. Approximately 75% of a vehicle can be recycled for other purposes.

Satellite part finder services are now commonly used to contact multiple salvage yards from a single source. In the past, call centres charged premium rates for calls and sent faxes to salvage yards to inquire about parts availability. Today, these services are web-based, with parts requests instantly emailed to salvage yards.

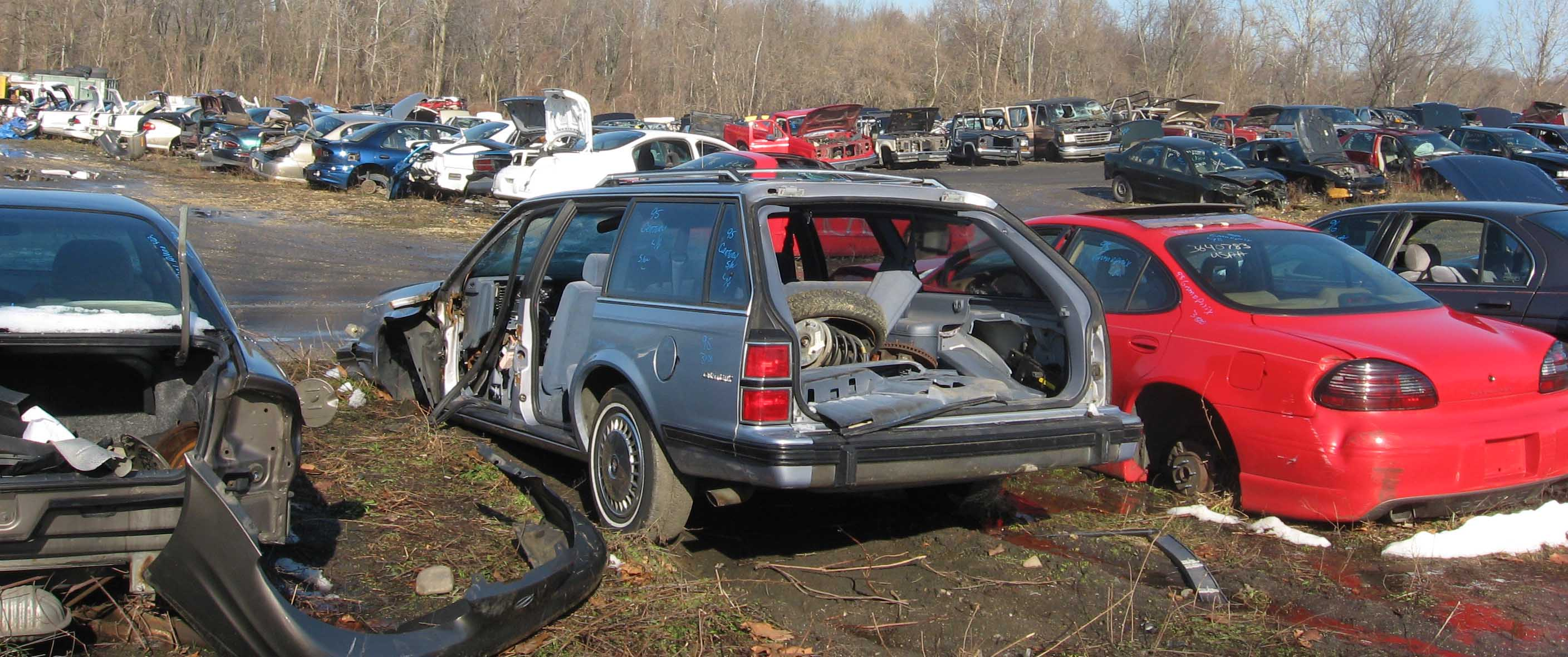
A "you pull it" junkyard in the United States

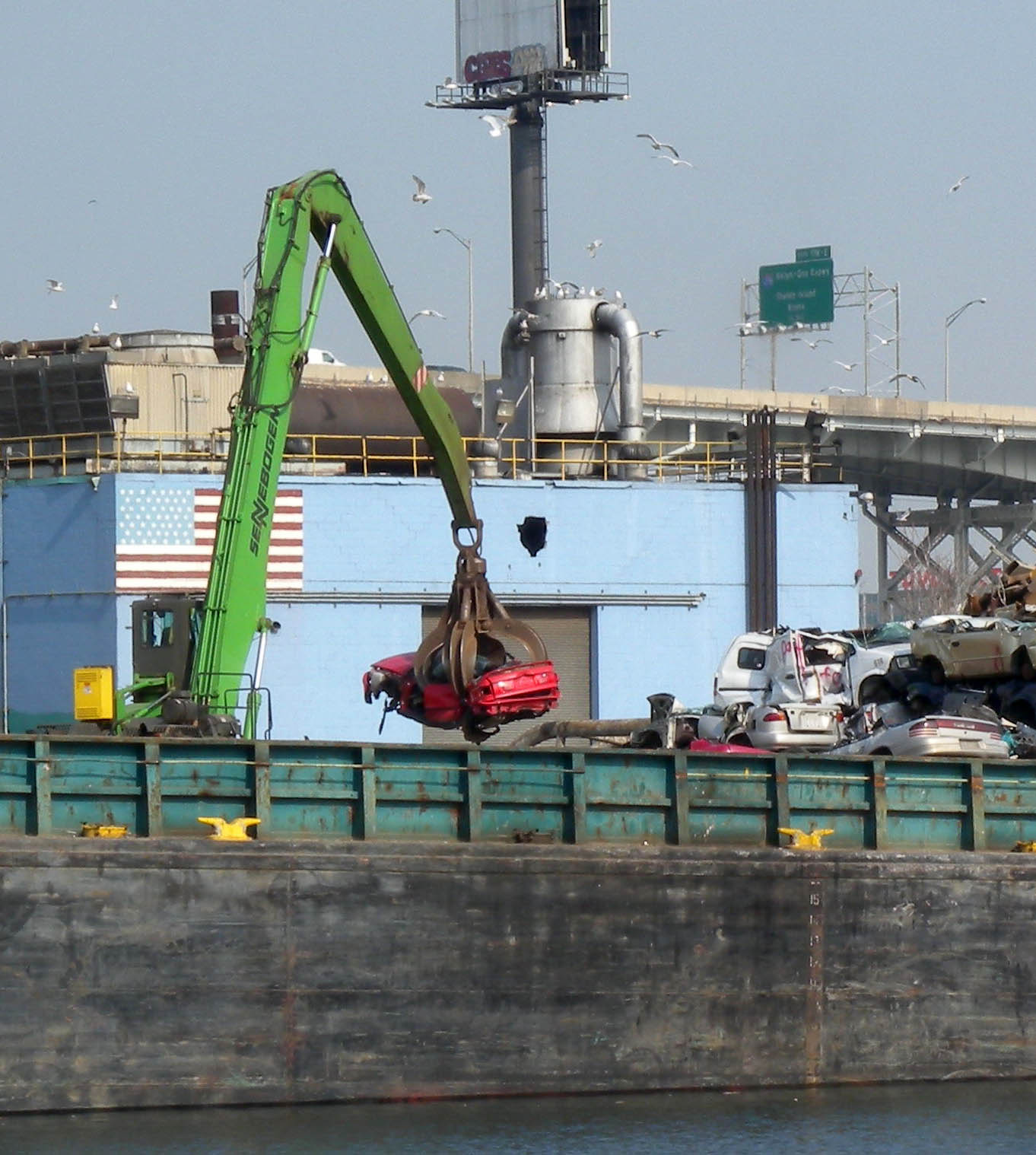
Loading a barge in New York

In high-demand salvage yards, popular car parts are pre-removed and stored in the warehouse for immediate customer access. Some yards offer self-service options where customers can remove parts themselves at a reduced cost. This model is commonly known as a "You Pull It" yard.

Customers typically call salvage yards to inquire about the availability of specific items. If the requested item is in stock, customers are asked to leave a deposit and pick up the part later. Customers or their mechanics usually install the part, but some salvage yards offer installation services.

Salvage yards typically dismantle vehicles to resell parts such as light assemblies, seats, exhaust components, mirrors, and hubcaps. Late-model vehicles may have body sections removed and stored as inventory. Engines and transmissions are often sold to auto-parts companies for rebuilding and resale. Windshields and windows in good condition can be resold. Some salvage yards sell damaged but repairable vehicles to hobbyists or collectors who restore them for personal use or resale. These individuals are known as "rebuilders".

Once vehicles in a wrecking yard are stripped of usable parts, the remaining hulks are typically sold to a scrap-metal processor. The processor crushes the bodies on-site using a mobile baling press, shredder, or flattener. Final disposal involves a hammer mill that smashes the vehicle remains into fist-sized chunks. These chunks are sold by the ton for further processing and recycling.

== Gallery ==
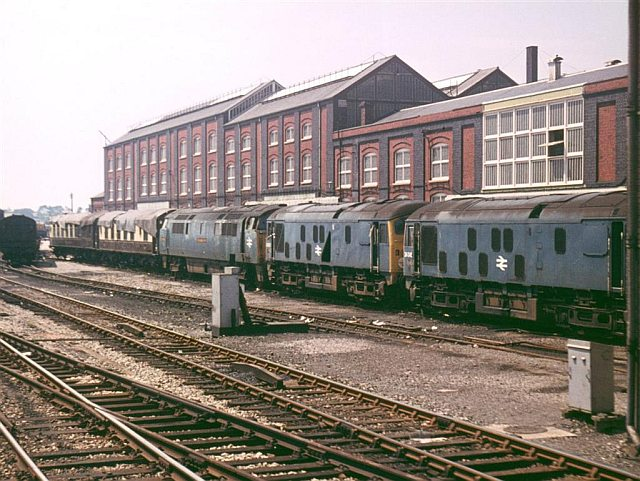
Former British Rail locomotives awaiting disposal at the now-closed Swindon Works, England, 1985

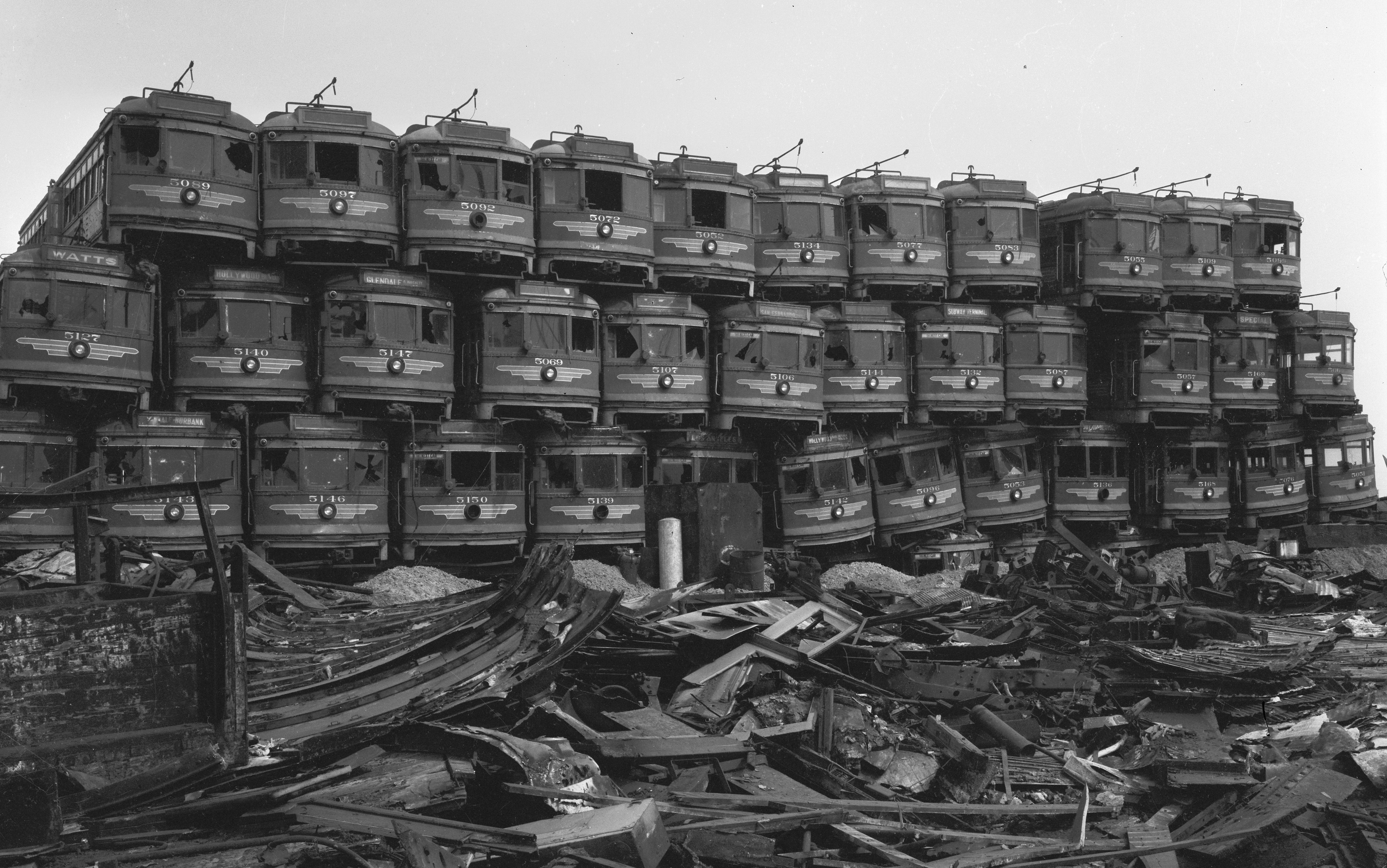
Former Pacific Electric Railway streetcars stacked at a junkyard awaiting destruction in the US, March 1956

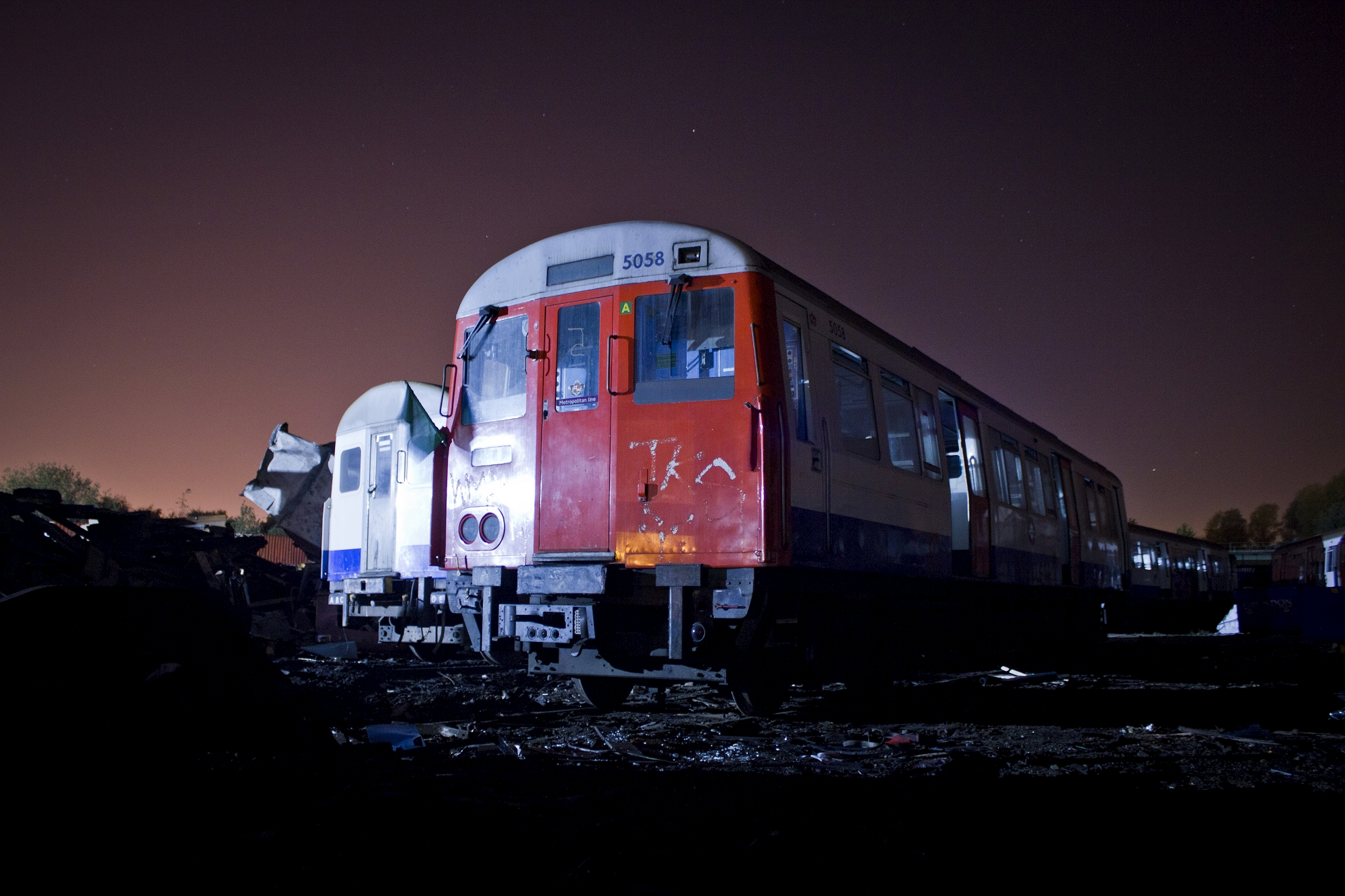
London Underground A Stock subway cars wait to be scrapped at CF Booth, Rotherham, England

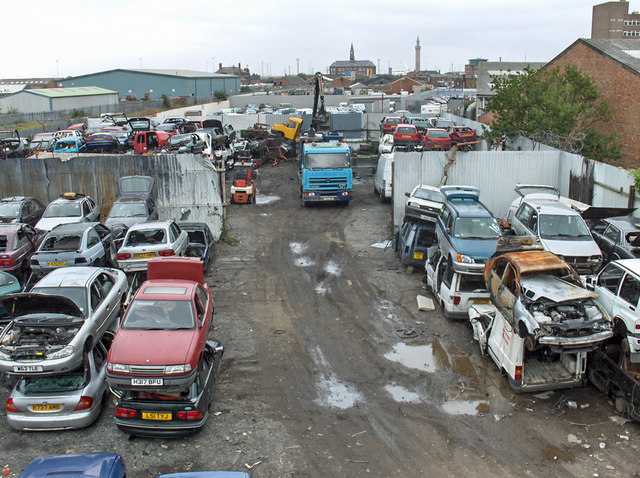
A car dismantling yard in Grimsby, England

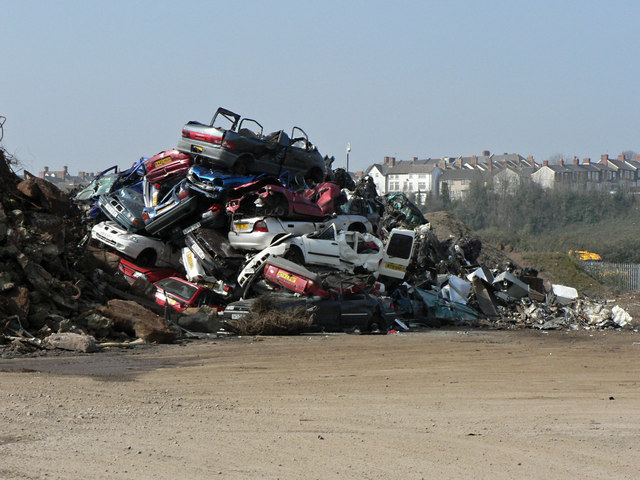
A pile of scrap vehicles

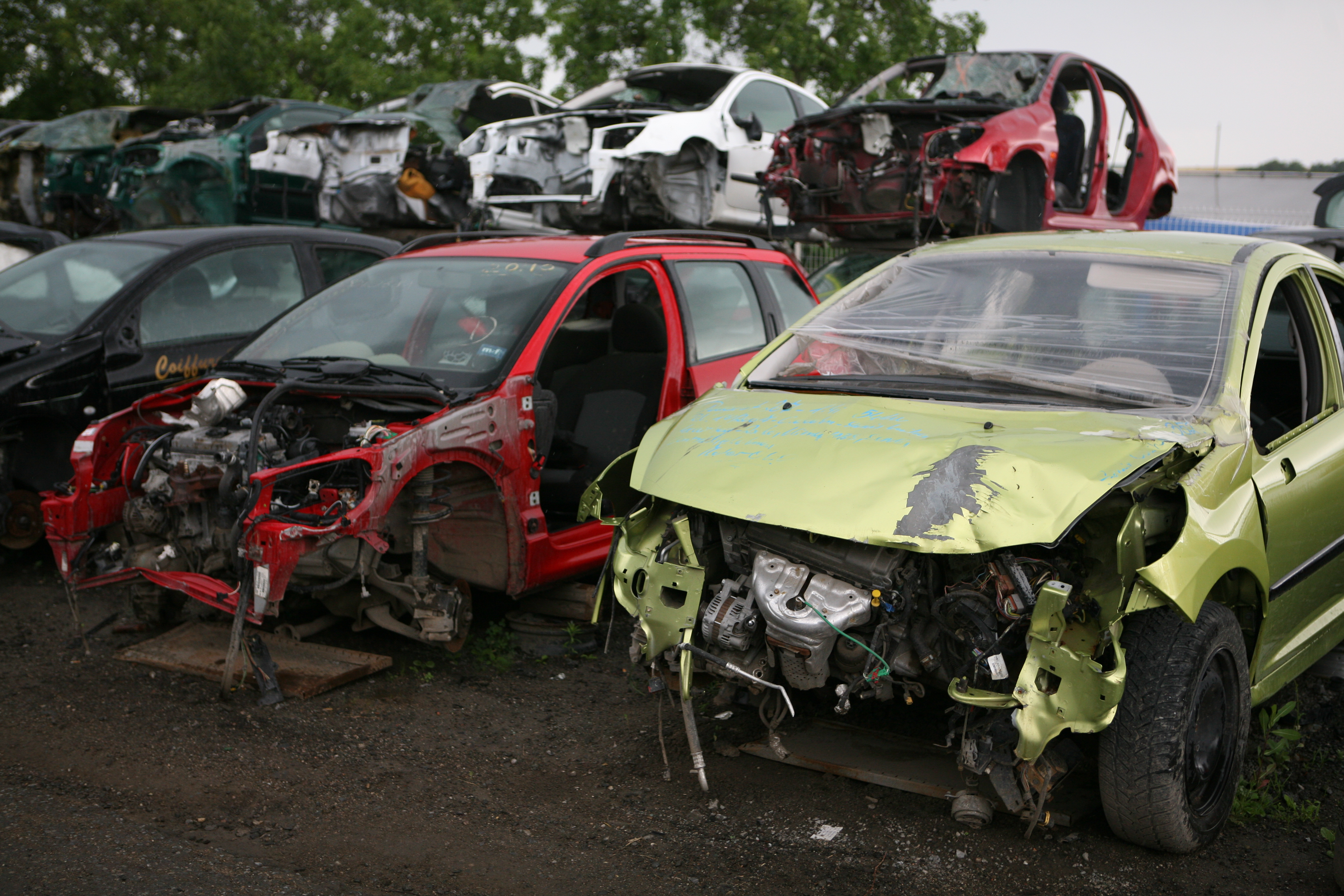
Rows of scrap cars

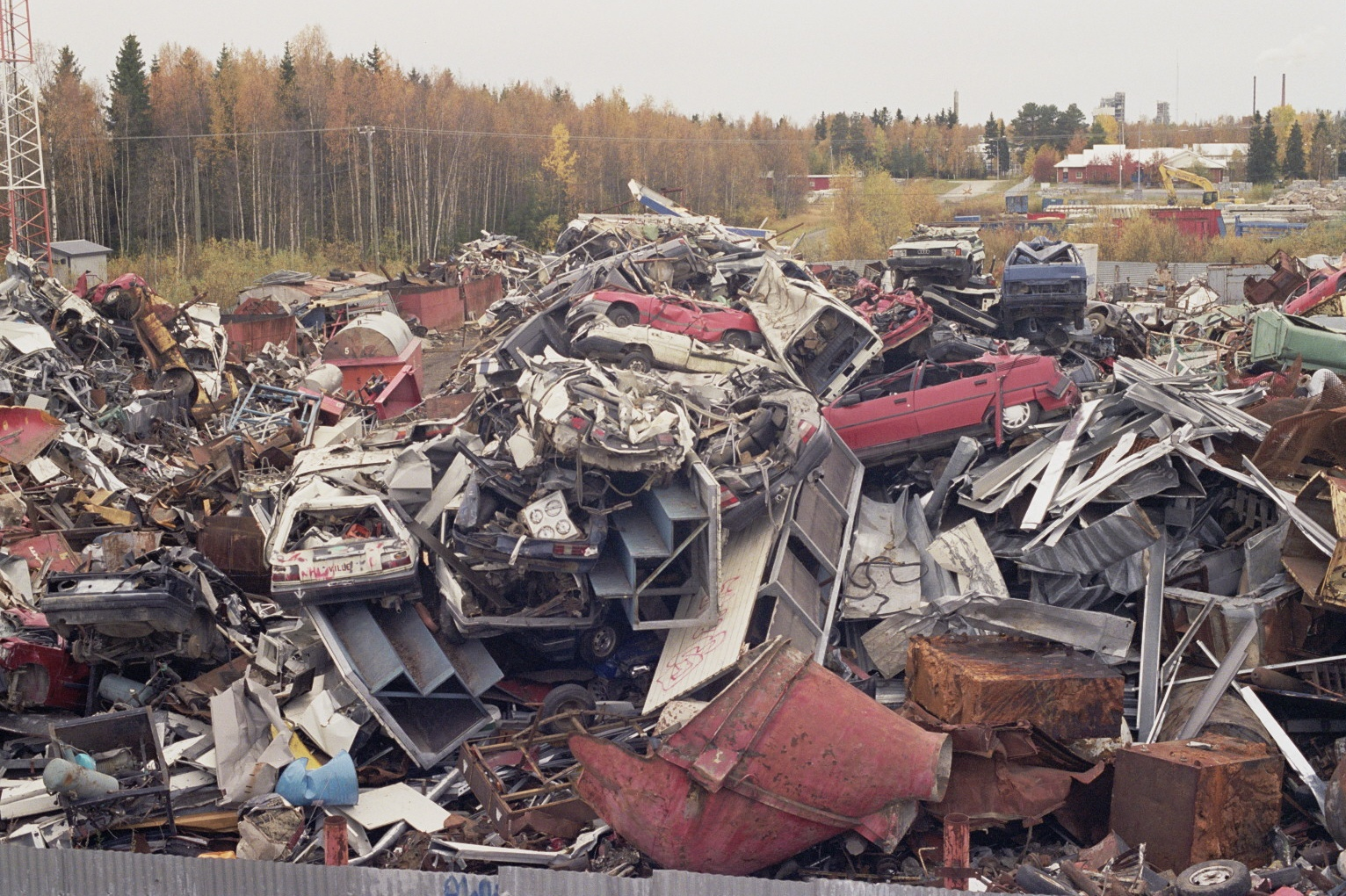
Scrapped cars and other metal scrap in Oulu, Finland

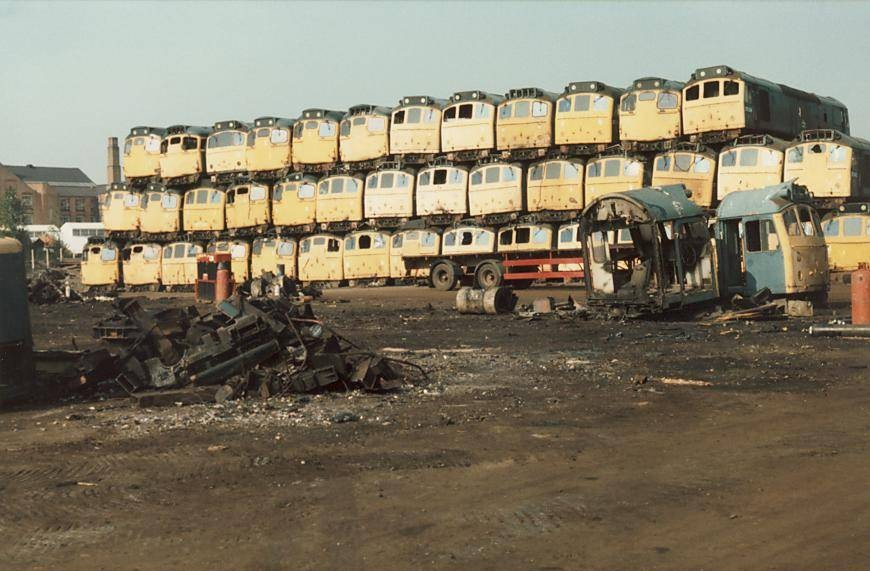
Former British Rail diesel locomotives stacked at Vic Berry, Leicester in October 1987

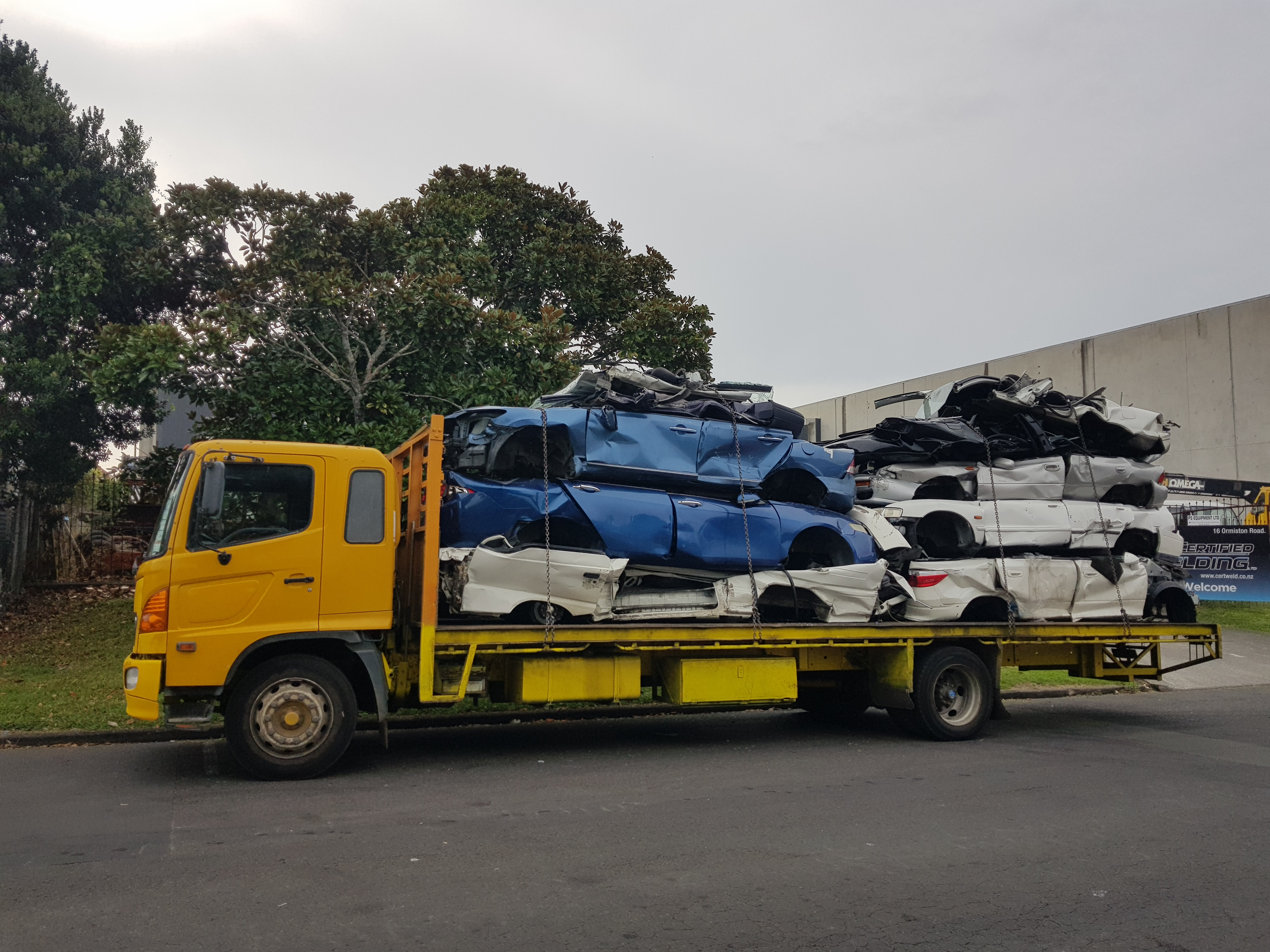
Truck loaded with scrap car bodies

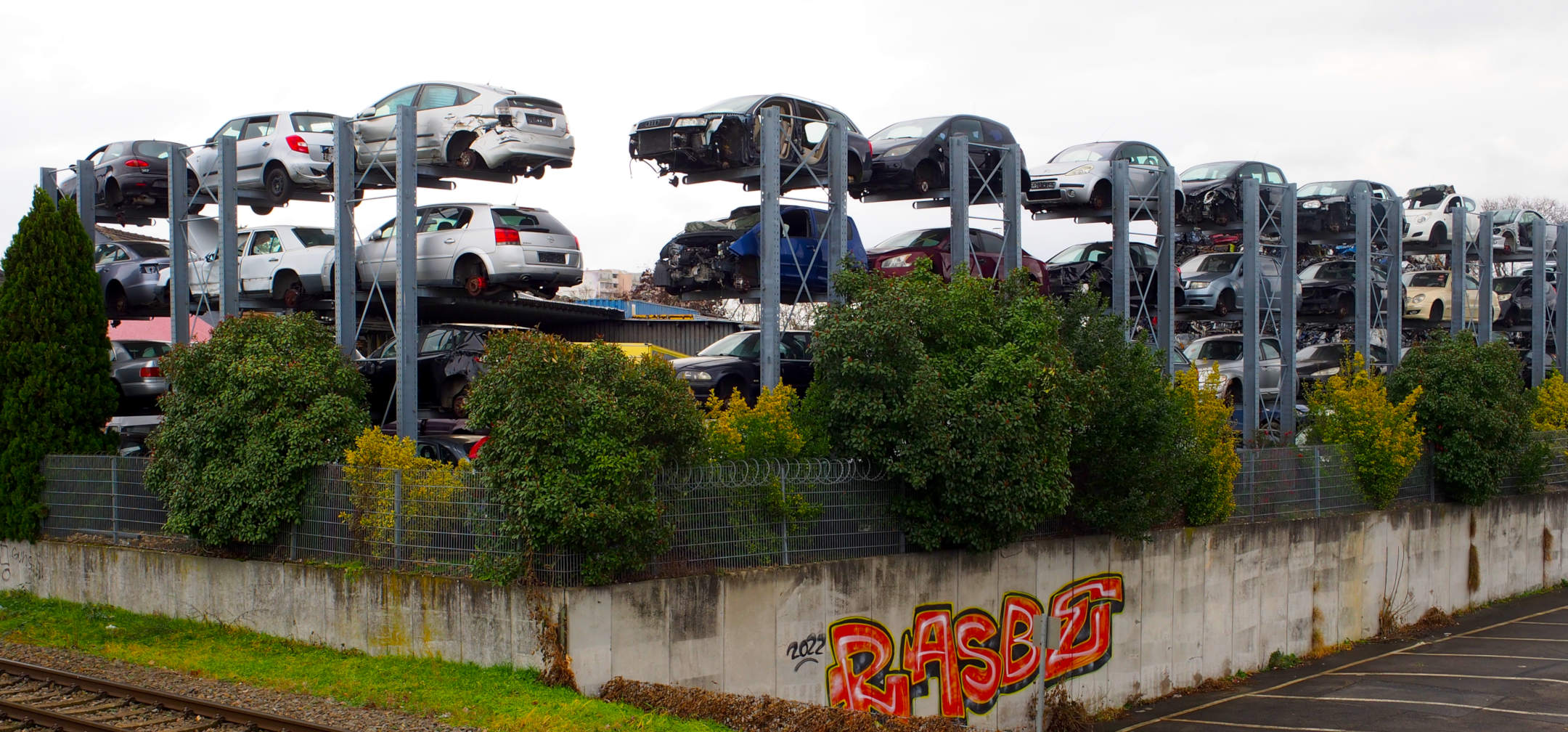
Stored wrecked cars

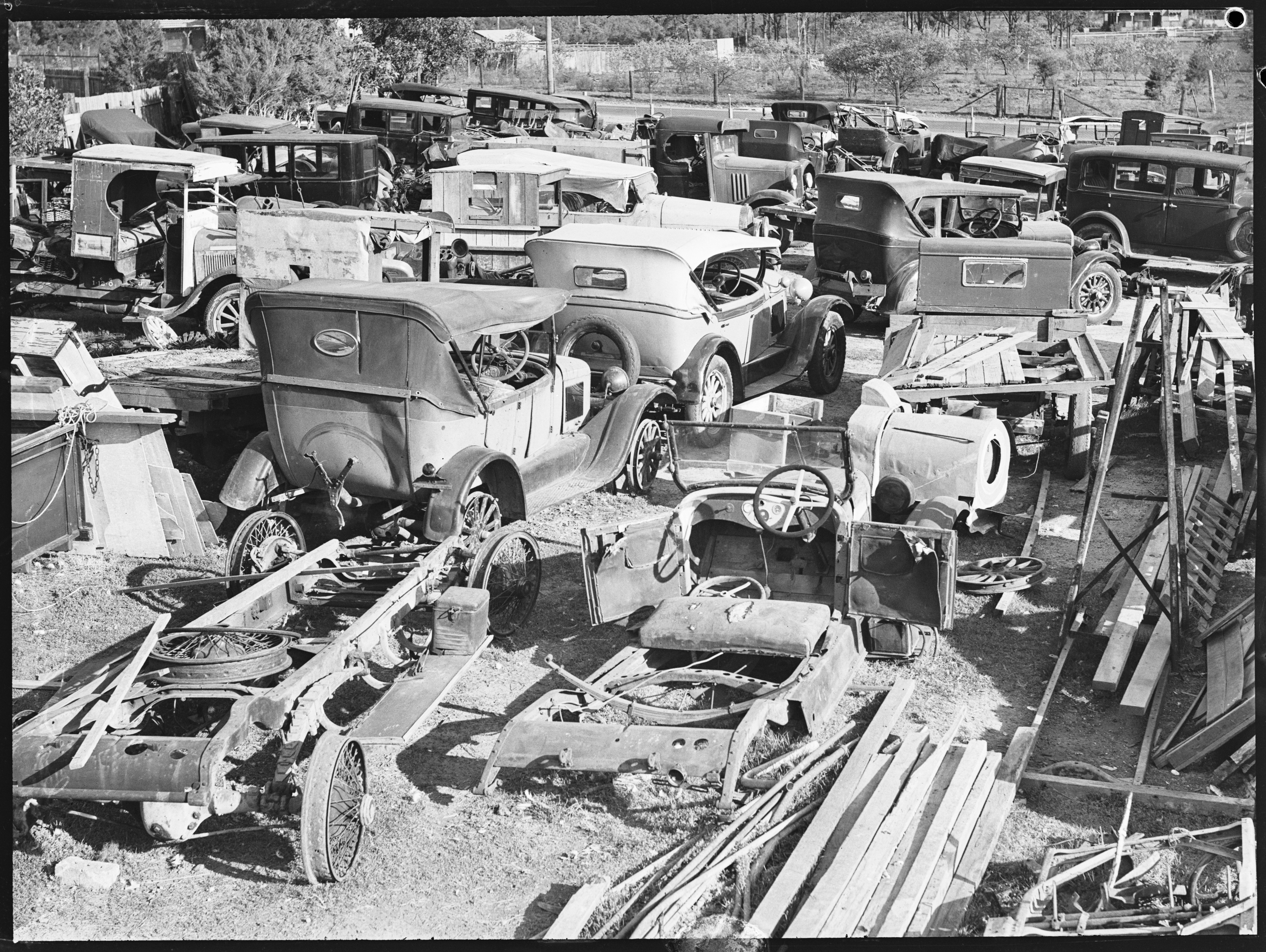
Car wreckers yard, Sydney, 1940

== See also ==
- Historischer Autofriedhof Gürbetal, Swiss wrecking yard which resembles a museum
- Vehicle graveyard
- Vehicle recycling
- Victory Auto Wreckers

== Bibliography ==
- Junkyards, Gearheads and Rust, salvaging the automotive past, David N. Lucsko, Johns Hopkins University Press, 2016 ISBN 978-1421419428
