= Uyuni =

- City
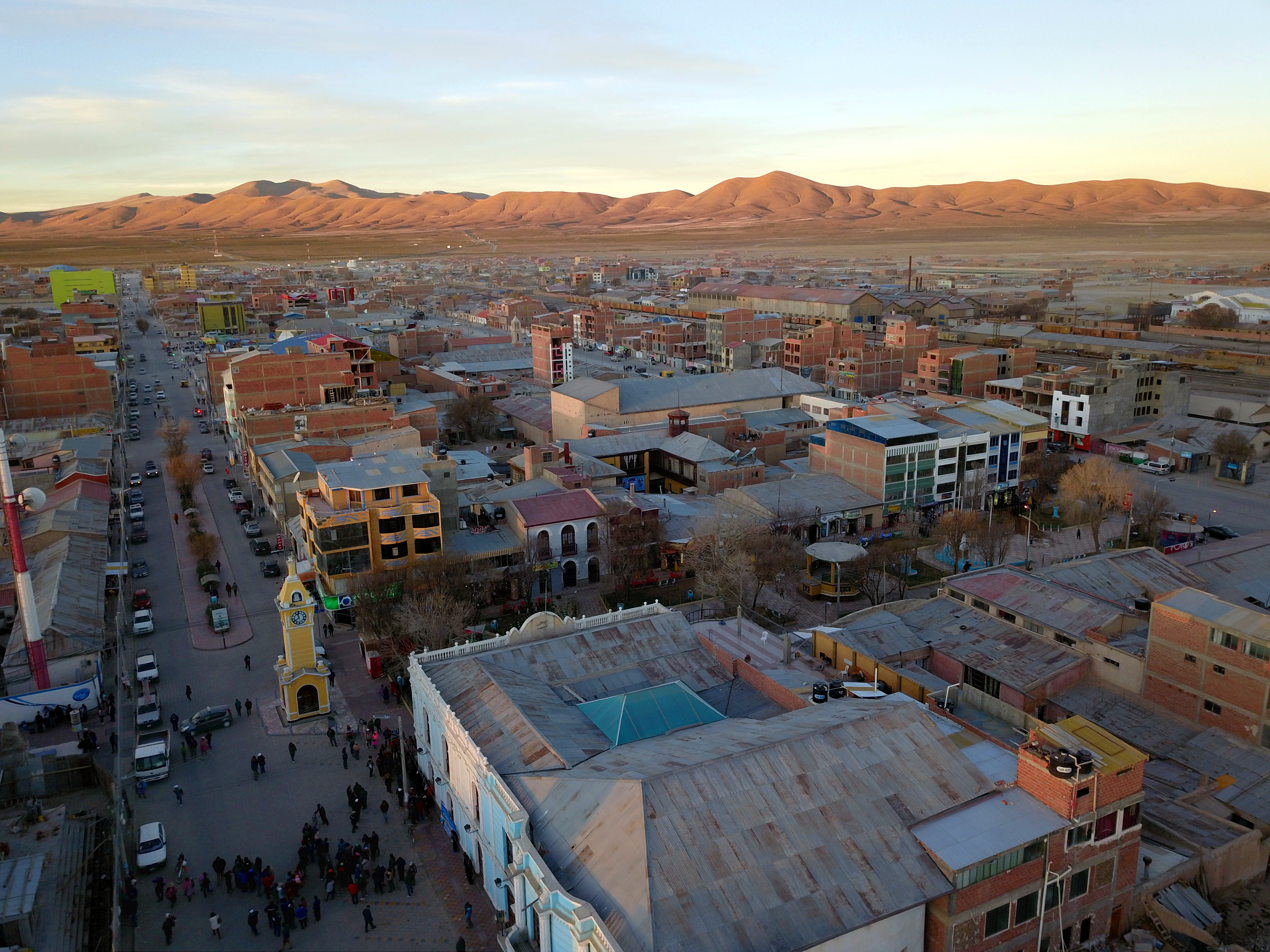
- Plaza Arce adjoins Potosí Avenue to mark the center of town.

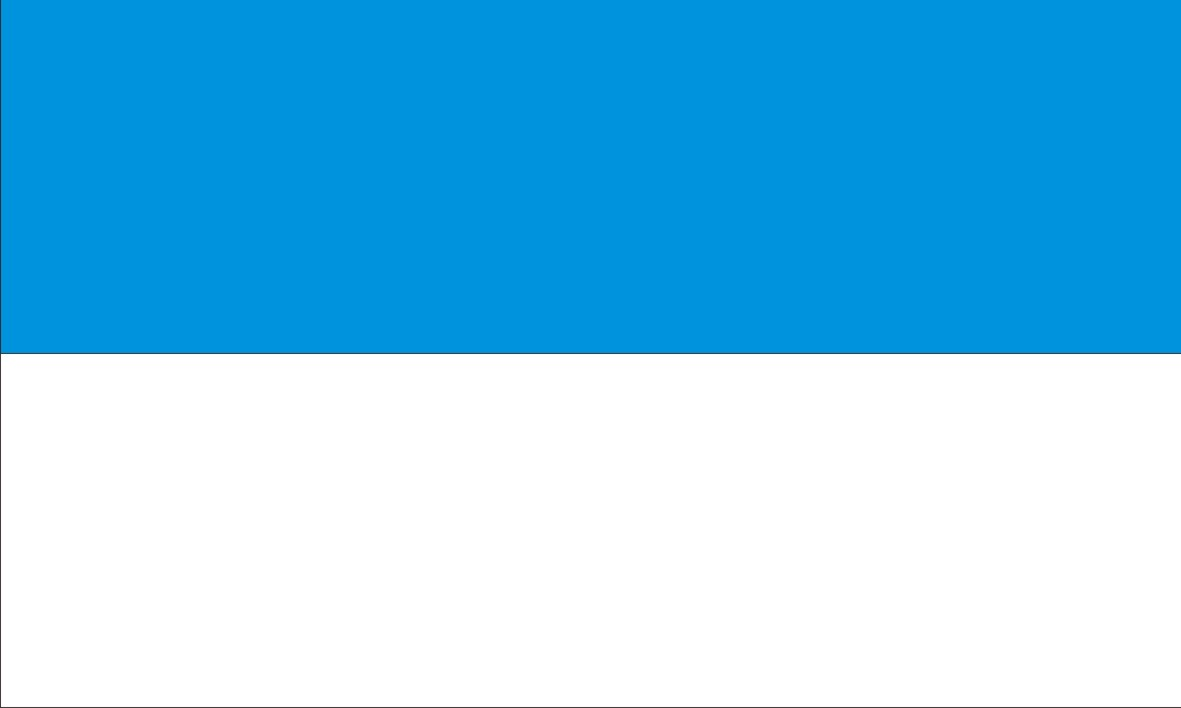
- Flag

- Location in Bolivia
- Coordinates: 20°27′46″S 66°49′26″W
- Country: Bolivia
- Department: Potosí Department
- Province: Antonio Quijarro Province
- Municipality: Uyuni Municipality
- Canton: Uyuni Canton

Population (2012)
  - Total: 29,672
  - Ethnicities: Quechua Aymara
- Time zone: UTC-4 (BOT)

Uyuni (Aymara, uyu pen, yard, cemetery, -ni a suffix to indicate ownership, "the one that has got a pen", "the one with a pen") is a city in the southwest of Bolivia.

Uyuni primarily serves as a gateway for tourists visiting the world's largest salt flats, the nearby Salar de Uyuni. Each year the city receives approximately 60,000 visitors from around the globe. The city also acts as a gateway for commerce and traffic crossing into and out of Bolivia from and to Chile, and there is a customs and immigration post downtown. Agriculture in the area is generally limited to quinoa, llamas, and sheep.

Founded in 1890 as a trading post, the city has a population of 29,672 (2012 official census). The town has an extensive street-market. It lies at the edge of an extensive plain at an elevation of 3,700 m (12,139 ft) above sea level, with more mountainous country to the east.

== Transport ==
It is an important transport hub, being the location of a major railway junction. Four lines join here, respectively from La Paz (via Oruro), Calama (in Chile), Potosí, and Villazón (on the Argentine border, where the line now ends).

Uyuni is connected by road to Oruro - La Paz, Sucre, Villazón (border with Argentina) and Ollagüe, Chile.

The city is also served by the Joya Andina Airport. Currently, two local airlines are flying regularly to the city from La Paz, Sucre and Rurrenabaque: Amazonas and Transporte Aéreo Militar.

== Tourist attractions ==
=== Train cemetery ===
One of the major tourist attractions of the area is an antique train cemetery. It is located 3 km outside Uyuni and is connected to it by the old train tracks. The town served in the past as a distribution hub for the trains carrying minerals on their way to the Pacific Ocean ports. The train lines were built by British engineers who arrived near the end of the 19th century and formed a sizable community in Uyuni. The engineers were invited by British-sponsored Antofagasta and Bolivia Railway Companies, which is now Ferrocarril de Antofagasta a Bolivia. The rail construction started in 1888 and ended in 1892. It was encouraged by the then Bolivian President Aniceto Arce, who believed Bolivia would flourish with a good transport system, but it was also constantly sabotaged by the local indigenous people who saw it as an intrusion into their lives. The trains were mostly used by the mining companies. In the 1940s, the mining industry collapsed, partly due to the mineral depletion. Many trains were abandoned thereby producing the train cemetery. There are talks to build a museum out of the cemetery.

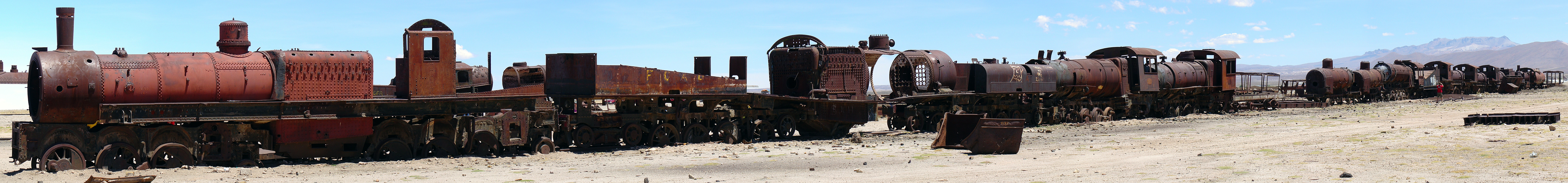
Train cemetery

== Images ==
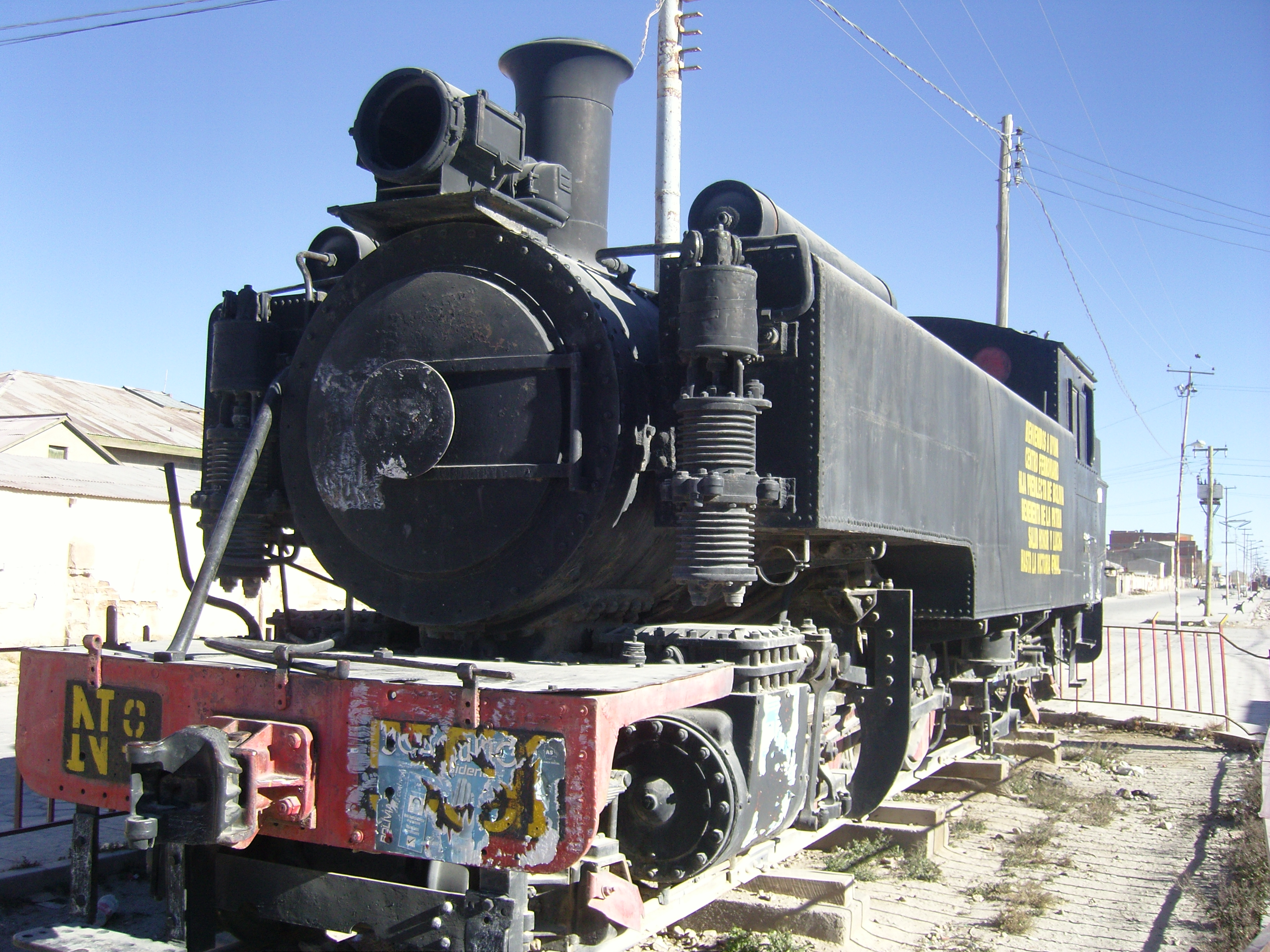
Av. Ferroviaria, Uyuni.

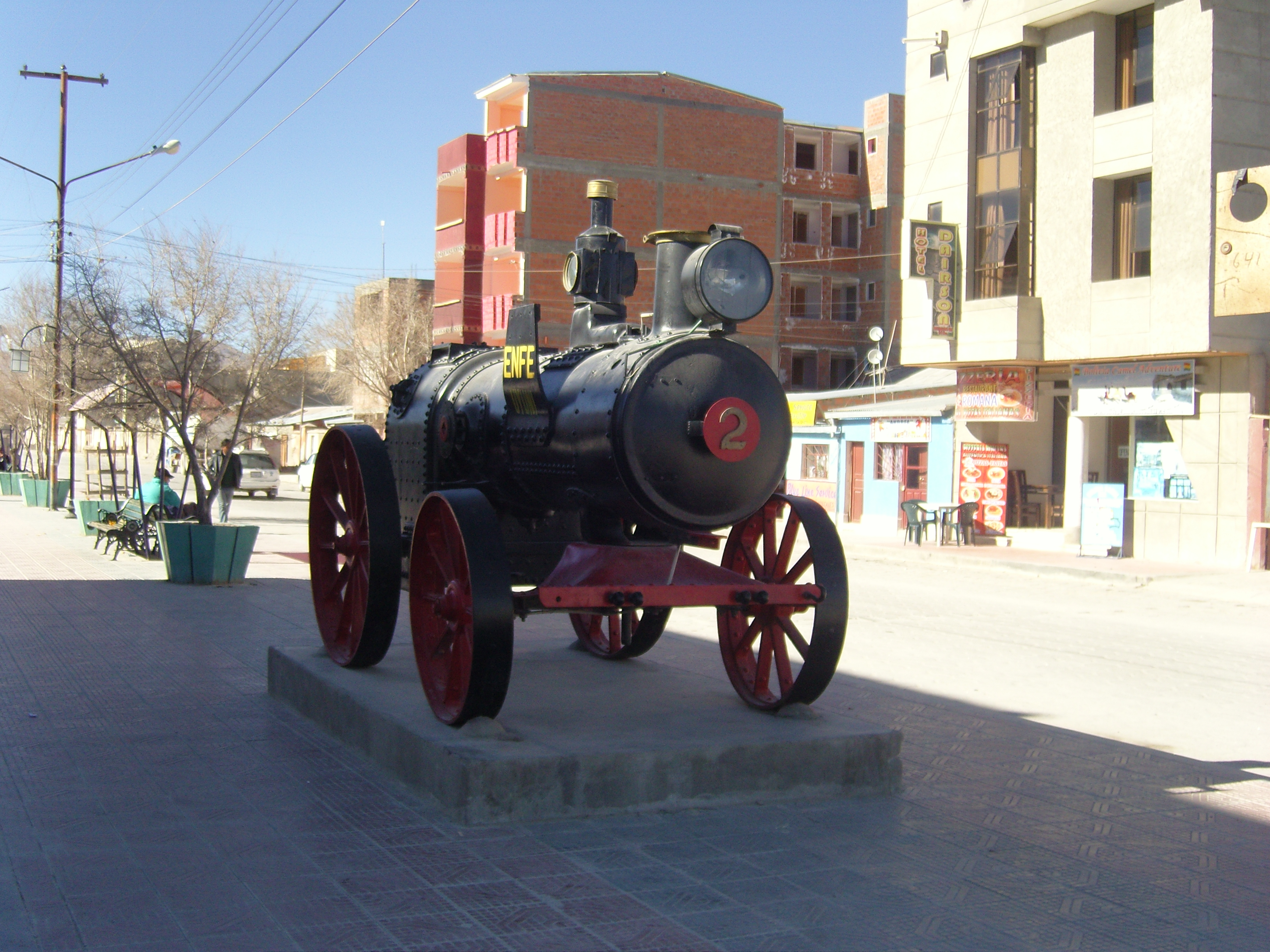
Av. Ferroviaria, Uyuni.

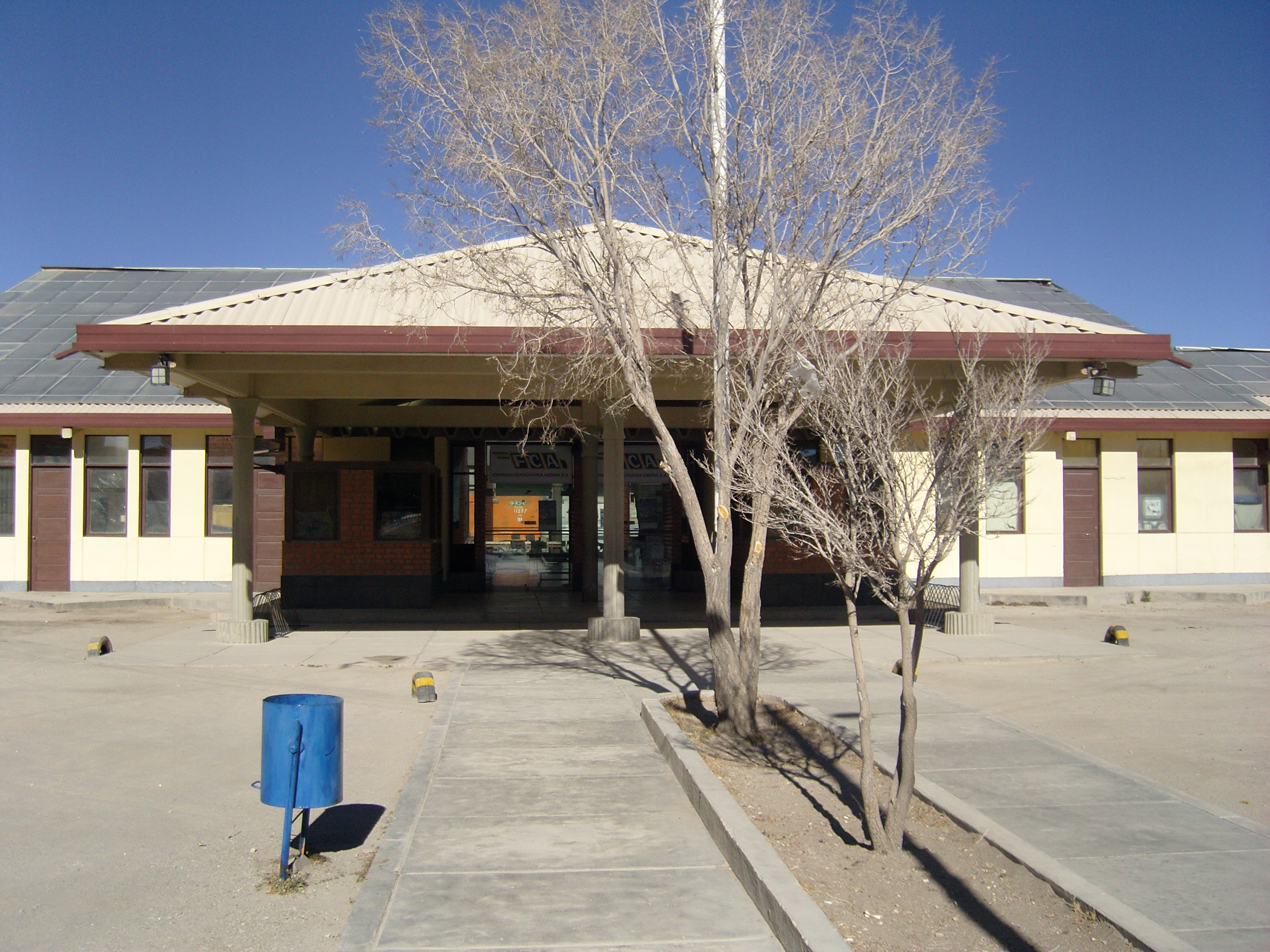
Estación de ferrocarriles, Uyuni.

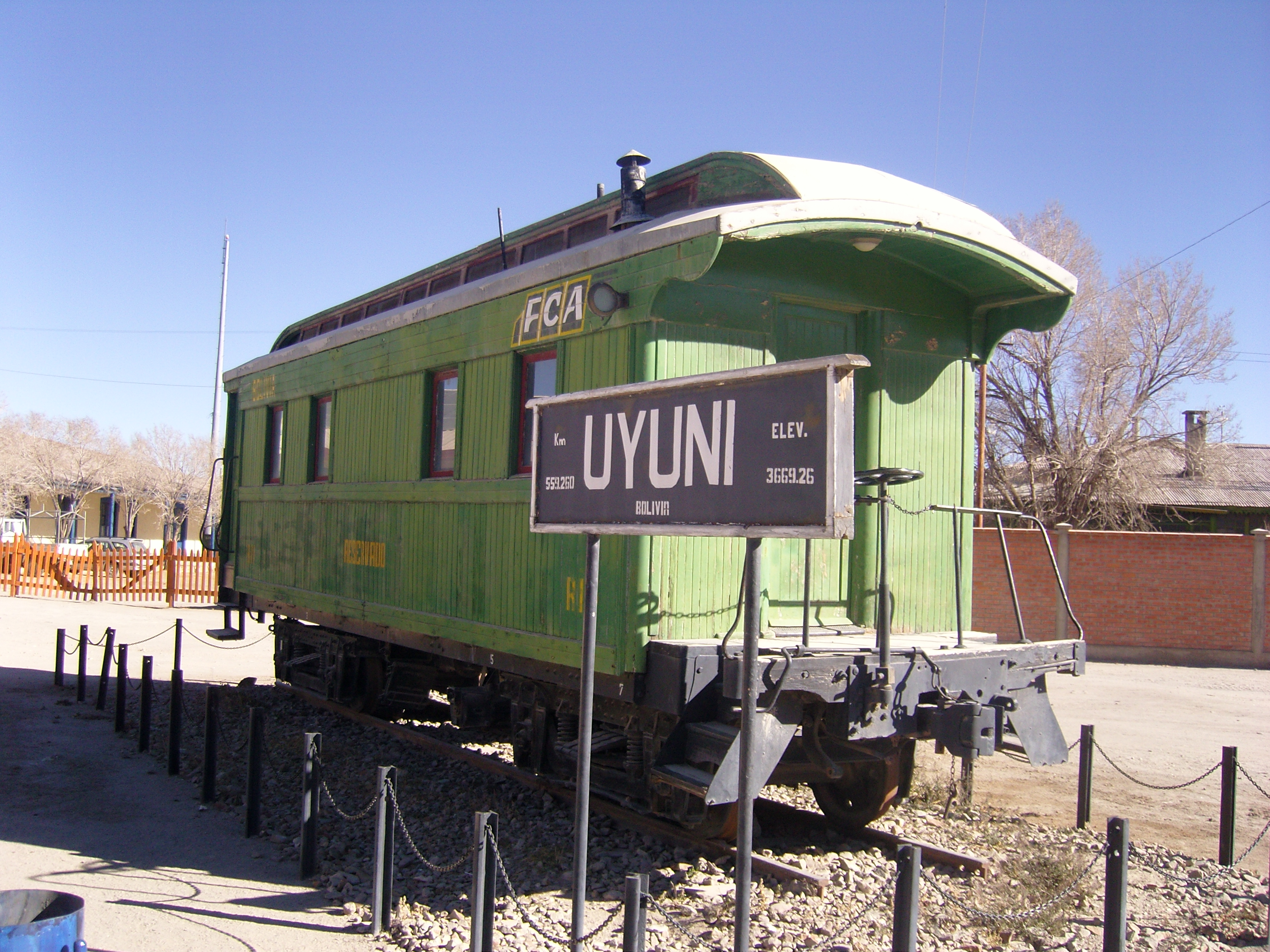
Estación de ferrocarriles, Uyuni.

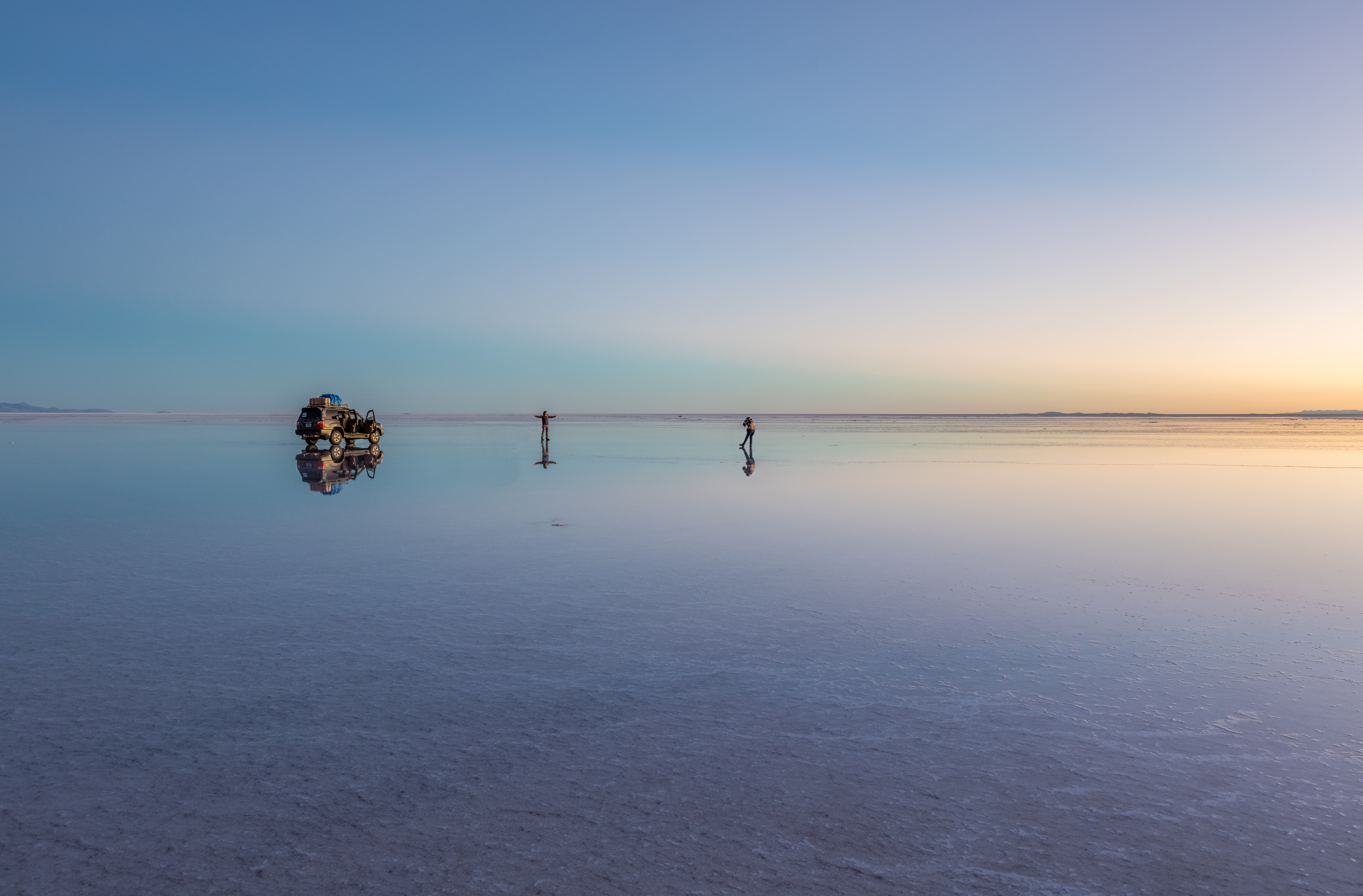
Uyuni salt flat.

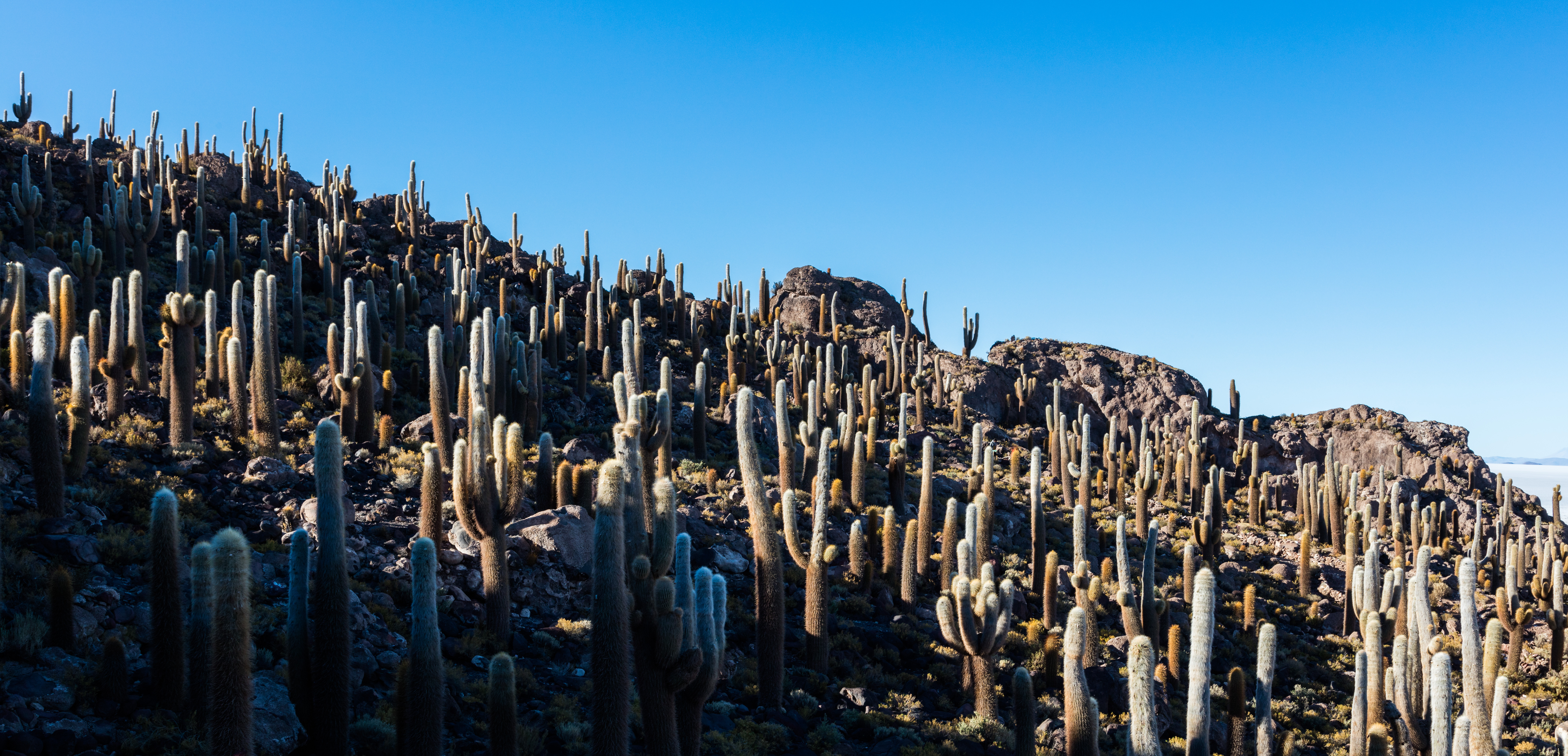
Isla del Pescado.

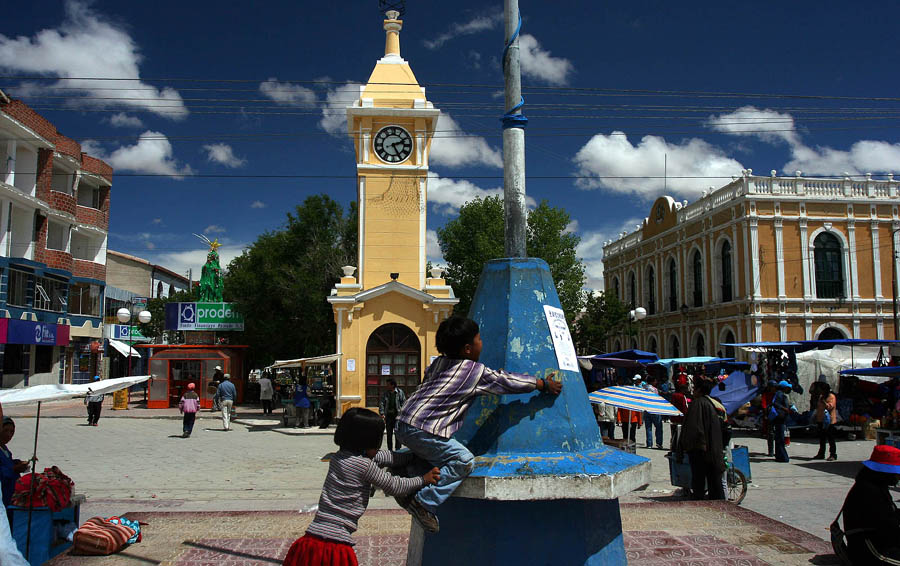
The clock tower.

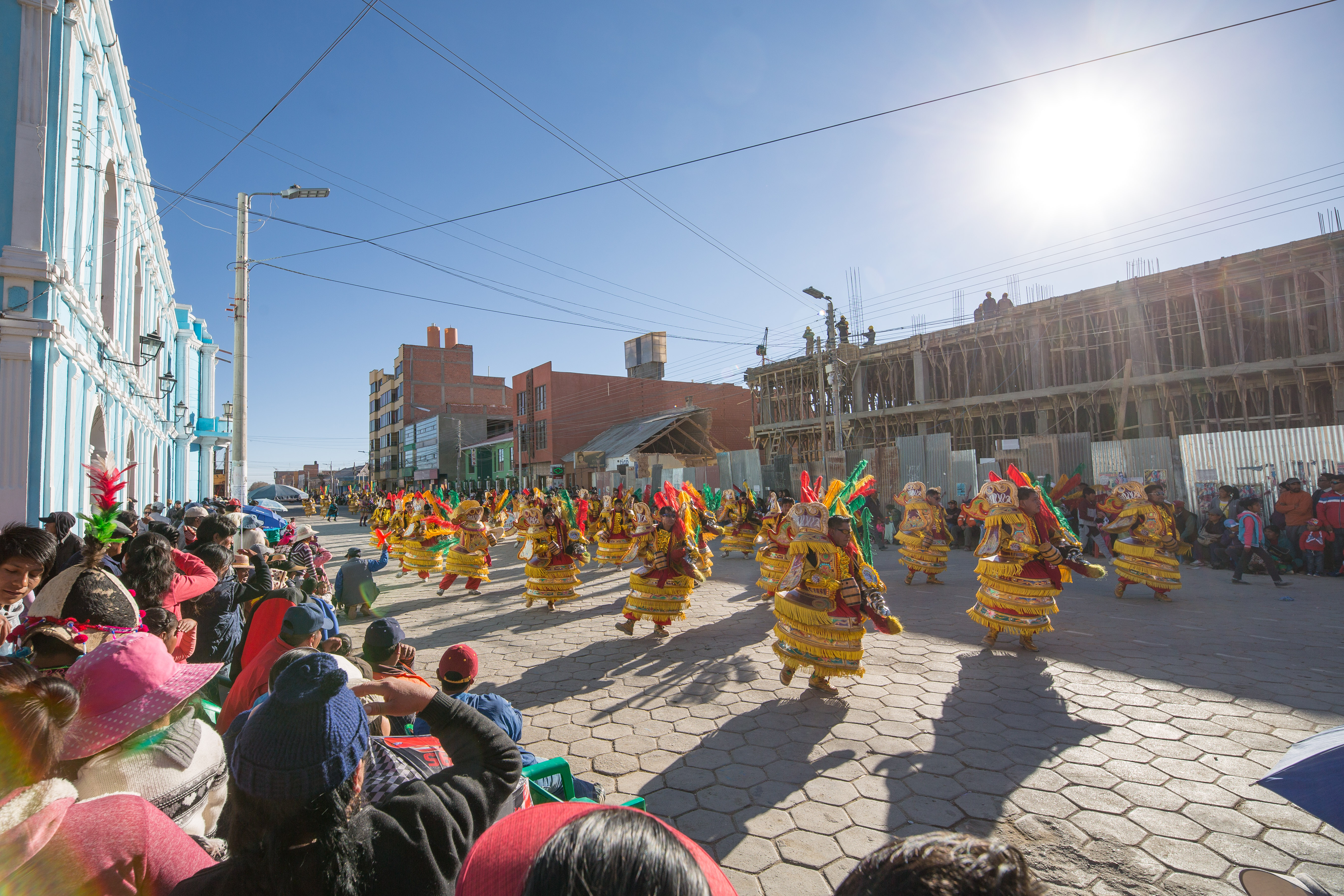
Dance parade in the streets of Uyuni.

== Climate ==
According to the Köppen climate classification, Uyuni has an alpine cold desert climate (Köppen climate classification BWk) with mild summers and cold winters. Night time temperatures stay chilly year round.

Climate data for Uyuni, elevation: 3,680 metres (12,070 ft), 1981–2010 normals, extremes 1945–present
Month	Jan	Feb	Mar	Apr	May	Jun	Jul	Aug	Sep	Oct	Nov	Dec	Year
Record high °C (°F)	30.0 (86.0)	30.0 (86.0)	31.5 (88.7)	26.4 (79.5)	24.0 (75.2)	19.5 (67.1)	20.5 (68.9)	29.0 (84.2)	26.1 (79.0)	26.8 (80.2)	28.2 (82.8)	29.1 (84.4)	31.5 (88.7)
Mean daily maximum °C (°F)	20.6 (69.1)	20.3 (68.5)	20.2 (68.4)	18.6 (65.5)	15.2 (59.4)	12.8 (55.0)	13.1 (55.6)	14.9 (58.8)	16.5 (61.7)	19.0 (66.2)	20.6 (69.1)	20.6 (69.1)	17.6 (63.7)
Daily mean °C (°F)	13.0 (55.4)	12.4 (54.3)	11.7 (53.1)	8.7 (47.7)	4.4 (39.9)	1.6 (34.9)	1.7 (35.1)	3.6 (38.5)	5.6 (42.1)	8.2 (46.8)	10.3 (50.5)	11.6 (52.9)	7.7 (45.9)
Mean daily minimum °C (°F)	5.5 (41.9)	4.6 (40.3)	3.3 (37.9)	−1.3 (29.7)	−6.3 (20.7)	−9.6 (14.7)	−9.7 (14.5)	−7.6 (18.3)	−5.4 (22.3)	−2.6 (27.3)	0.1 (32.2)	2.7 (36.9)	−2.1 (28.2)
Record low °C (°F)	−7.4 (18.7)	−6.0 (21.2)	−10.0 (14.0)	−14.0 (6.8)	−22.0 (−7.6)	−22.0 (−7.6)	−24.0 (−11.2)	−25.7 (−14.3)	−21.5 (−6.7)	−19.2 (−2.6)	−15.2 (4.6)	−8.8 (16.2)	−25.7 (−14.3)
Average precipitation mm (inches)	79.3 (3.12)	37.7 (1.48)	28.5 (1.12)	2.3 (0.09)	0.8 (0.03)	1.8 (0.07)	0.0 (0.0)	1.7 (0.07)	1.8 (0.07)	2.8 (0.11)	3.8 (0.15)	26.4 (1.04)	190.9 (7.52)
Average precipitation days	11.1	7.3	5.8	1.0	0.3	0.9	0.0	0.3	0.4	0.3	0.9	3.8	32.8
Average snowy days	0.0	0.24	0.0	0.0	0.04	0.03	0.0	0.10	0.0	0.0	0.0	0.0	0.48
Source: Servicio Nacional de Meteorología e Hidrología de Bolivia
