= Shumkovo, Beryozovsky District, Perm Krai =

Shumkovo Шумково
- Village
- Location within Perm Krai Location within Russia
- Coordinates: 57°35′N 57°16′E
- Country: Russia
- Region: Perm Krai
- District: Beryozovsky District
- Time zone: UTC+5:00

Shumkovo (Russian: Шумково) is a rural locality (a village) in Zaboryinskoye Rural Settlement, Beryozovsky District, Perm Krai, Russia. The population was 12 as of 2010.

== Geography ==
Shumkovo is located on the Shakva River, 4 km southwest of Beryozovka, the district's administrative centre, by road. Klychi and Pirozhkovo are the nearest rural localities.
