= USS Yo Ho =

Patrol vessel of the United States Navy

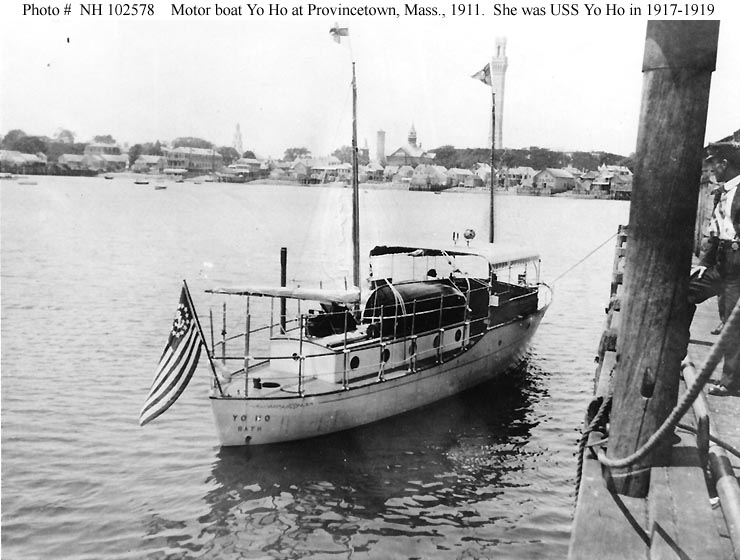
- Yo Ho as a private vessel at Provincetown, Massachusetts, in 1911, on her way to the New York City-to-Bermuda race

History

United States
- Name: USS Yo Ho
- Namesake: Previous name retained
- Builder: Bath Marine Construction Company, Bath, Maine
- Completed: 1910
- Acquired: 1917
- Commissioned: 12 May 1917
- Fate: Sold for scrapping 2 June 1919
- Notes: Operated as private motorboat Yo Ho 1910-1917

General characteristics
- Type: Patrol vessel
- Length: 46 ft 4 in (14.12 m)
- Beam: 10 ft 0 in (3.05 m)
- Draft: 2 ft 8.5 in (0.826 m) mean
- Speed: 9 knots
- Complement: 4
- Armament: 2 × machine guns

USS Yo Ho (SP-463) was an armed motorboat that served in the United States Navy as a patrol vessel from 1917 to 1919.

Yo Ho was built in 1910 at Bath, Maine, by the Bath Marine Construction Company. The U.S. Navy acquired her for World War I service from H. D. Bacon, of Bath, designated her SP-463, armed her, and commissioned her on 12 May 1917 as USS Yo Ho.

Operating in an unattached status from the 2nd Naval District, Yo Ho served through the armistice which ended the war on 11 November 1918.

Yo Ho was sold for scrap on 2 June 1919 to G. F. Blackburn of New York, New York. Her voyage to the scrapyard was eventful. On 14 June 1919, she was tied to the patrol boat USS Patrol No. 7 (SP-31) and along with Patrol No. 7 under tow by the submarine chaser USS SC-241 when Patrol No. 7 sank between Scituate, Massachusetts, and Minot's Ledge, about 15 nautical miles (28 kilometers) southeast of the Boston Light Vessel. Yo Ho apparently remained afloat despite this mishap and continued her voyage to the scrapyard.
