= Vehicle graveyard =

Location where cars are abandoned

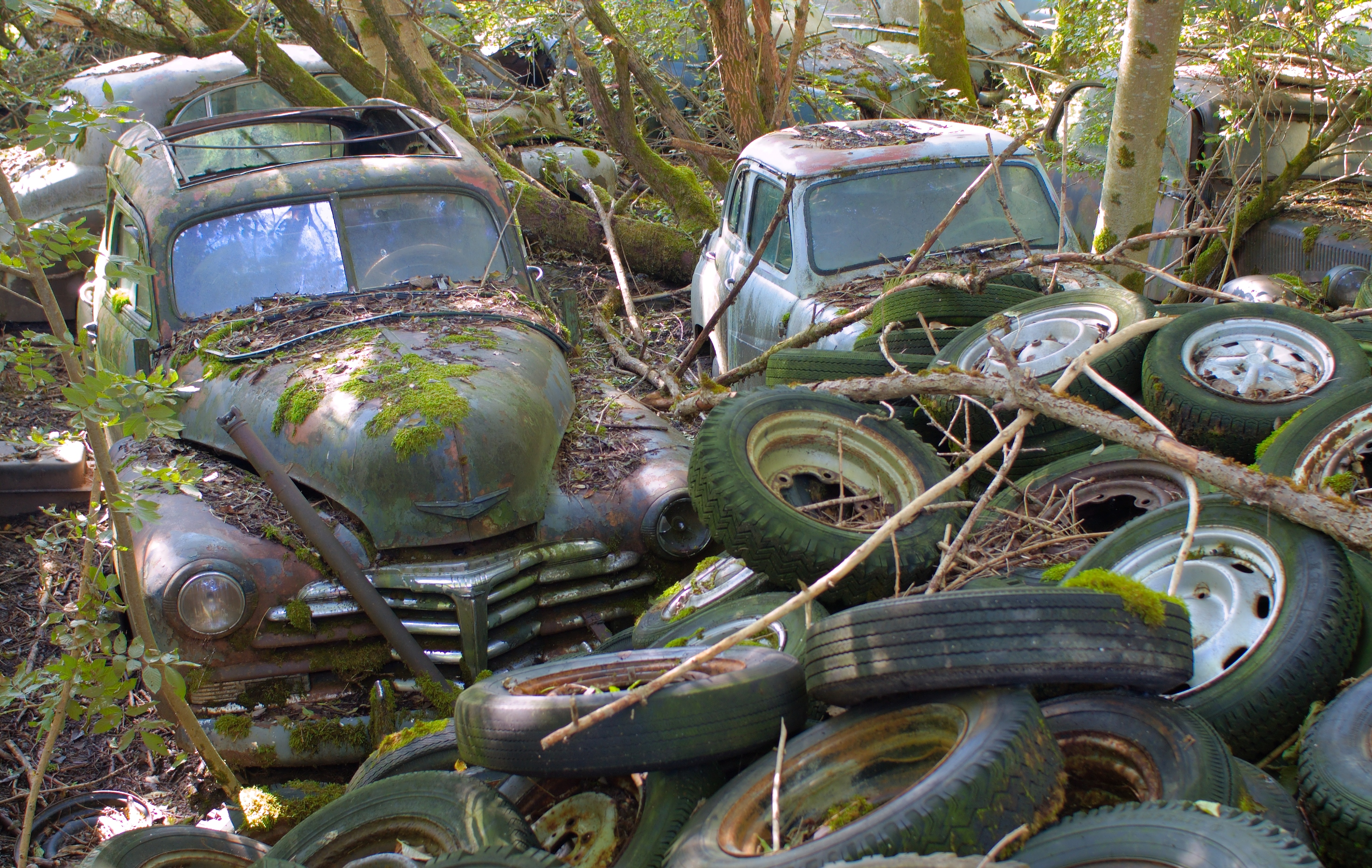
A car graveyard in Kaufdorf, September 2008

A vehicle graveyard, cemetery, or boneyard is a location in which several vehicles, often of the same type, have been abandoned. The vehicles might be awaiting dismantling or recycling, or may just be left to decay. Most sites are intentionally created and many have security to protect them while others are forgotten and lay undiscovered for some time. These sites can be popular destinations for urban explorers.

== Specific types of vehicle ==
=== Aircraft ===
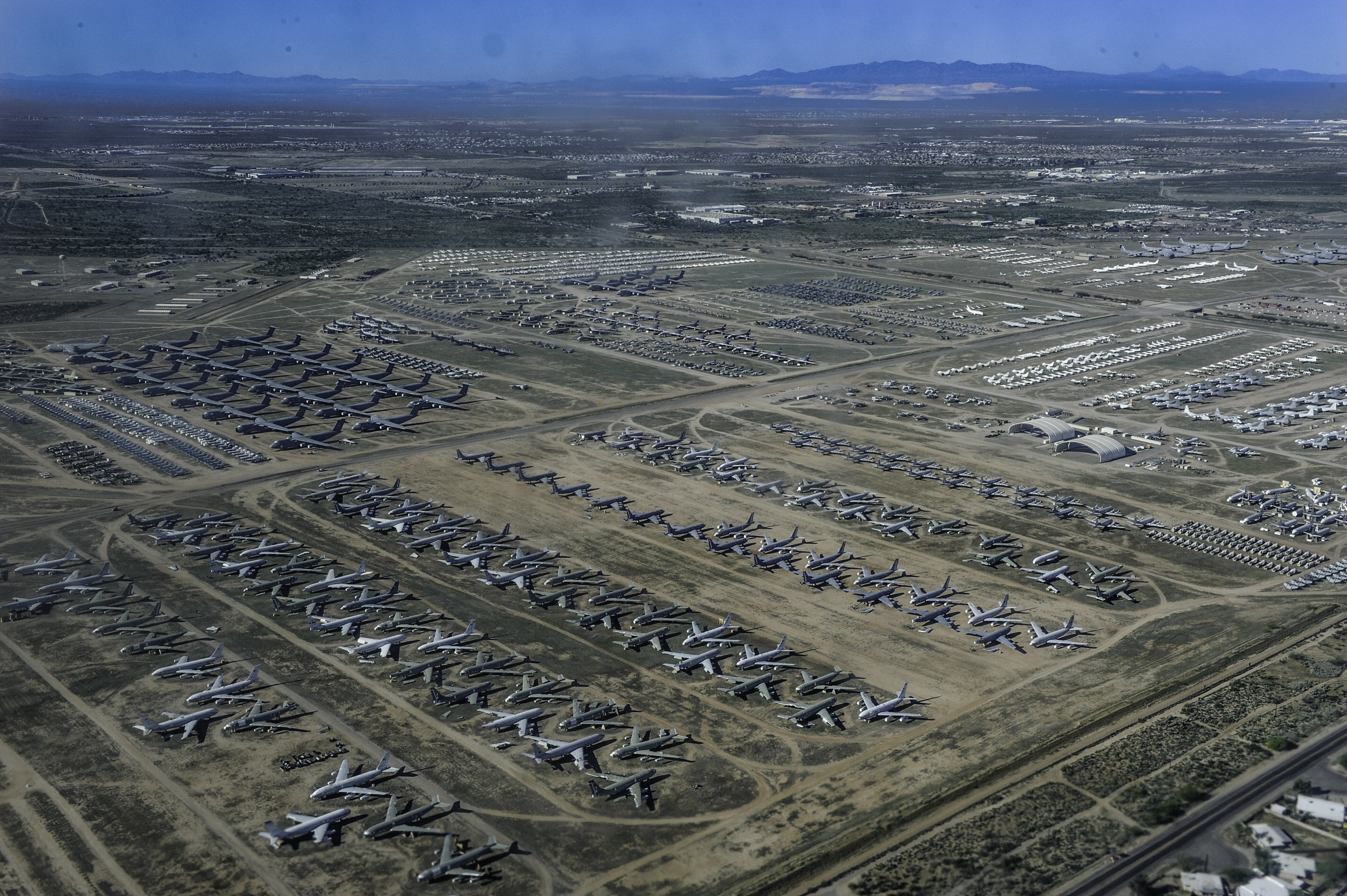
Aircraft in storage at the 309th Aerospace Maintenance and Regeneration Group in Arizona

An aircraft graveyard, or boneyard, is a location where numerous aircraft have been stored. The largest of which is the 309th Aerospace Maintenance and Regeneration Group, a near 2,600-acre site containing around 4,400 aircraft. There is an area in the southern Pacific Ocean, the oceanic pole of inaccessibility, in which over 260 spacecraft and satellites have been deposited after their working life, including the Mir space station.

=== Automobiles ===
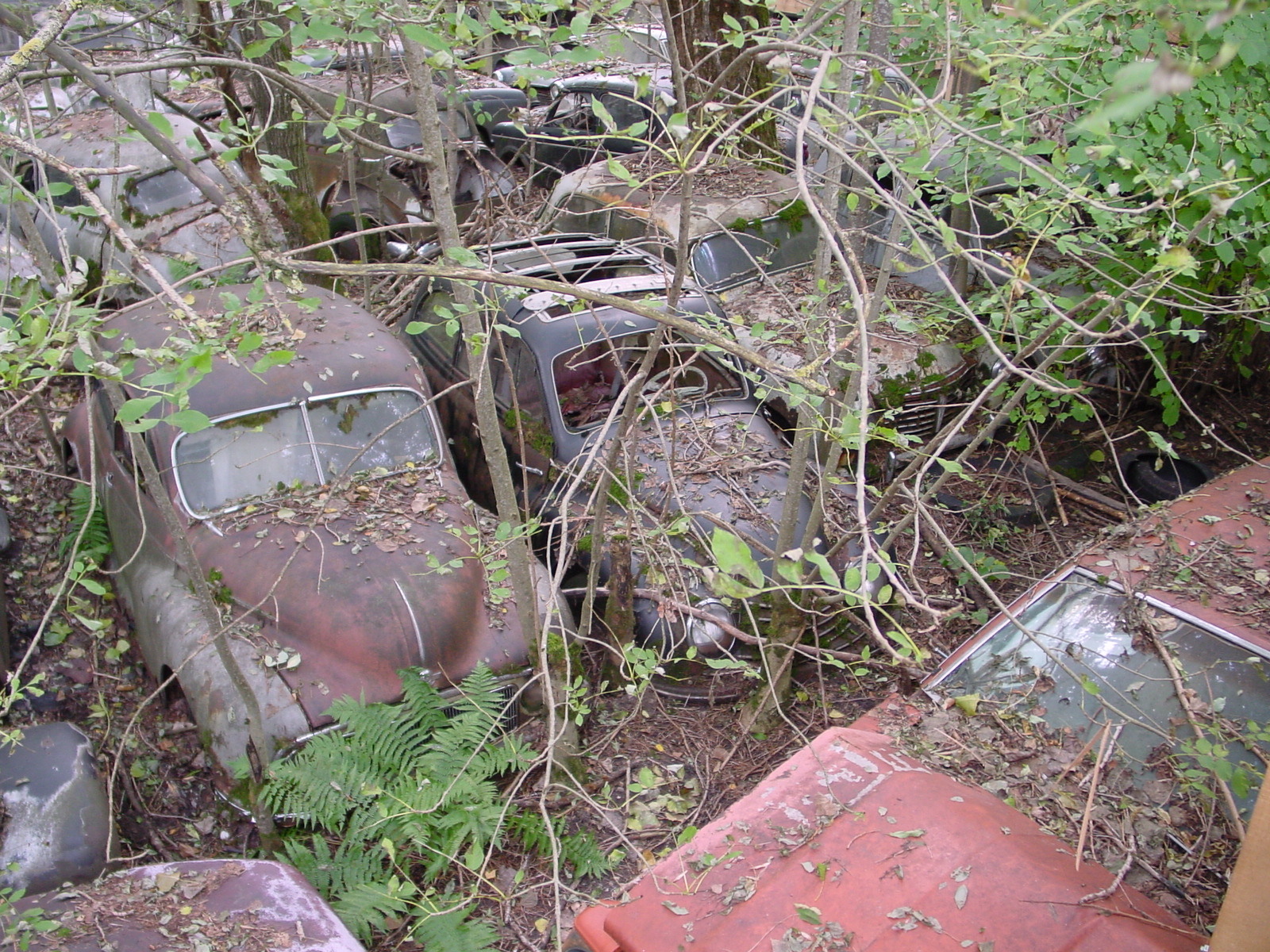
A car graveyard in Kaufdorf, 2008, before it was cleared

An automobile graveyard is a location in which cars or other road vehicles are kept until they have decayed or been destroyed. One particularly noteworthy example is near Victorville, California where hundreds of thousands of cars bought back by Volkswagen after the 2015 emissions scandal now reside.

=== Ships ===
A ship graveyard is a location where the hulls of ships are left to decay and disintegrate. The largest ship graveyard is in the bay of Nouadhibou, Mauritania, where more than 300 vessels can be found.

=== Trains ===
A train graveyard is where trains and rolling stock are left to decay. The "Cementerio de Trenes" (train cemetery) near Uyuni, Bolivia serves as a tourist attraction with trains dating back to the 19th century left to rust in the extensive salt flats of the Salar de Uyuni.
