= Uyuni Airport =

Airport in Bolivia

Joya Andina International Airport Aeropuerto Internacional La Joya Andina
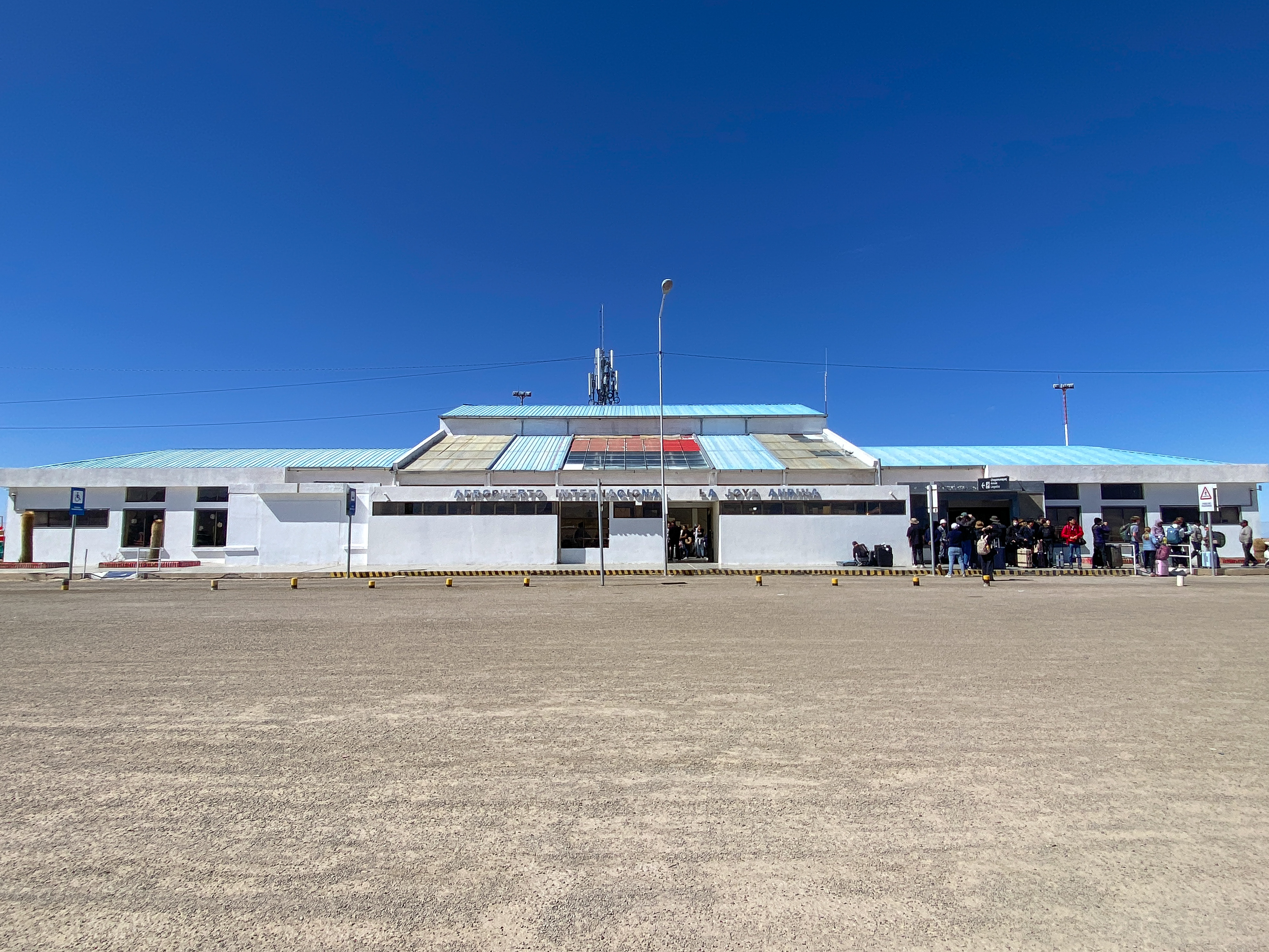
- Main terminal at Joya Andina Airport
- IATA: UYU; ICAO: SLUY

Summary
- Airport type: Public
- Serves: Uyuni, Potosí, Bolivia
- Elevation AMSL: 12,024 ft / 3,665 m
- Coordinates: 20°26′35″S 66°51′15″W

Map
- Location of the airport in Bolivia

Runways
Direction	Length		Surface
Direction	m	ft	Surface
13/31	4,000	13,123	Asphalt

Statistics (2023)
- Passengers: 42,997
- Source: Landings.com, GCM

Joya Andina International Airport (IATA: UYU, ICAO: SLUY), also known as Uyuni Airport, is an airport at extremely high elevation just northwest of Uyuni, in the southwestern Potosí Department of Bolivia. It is close to the Salar de Uyuni, the world's largest salt flat. It was opened by the Bolivian president Evo Morales on July 11, 2011. Currently the airport is served by one airline: Boliviana de Aviacion which offers regular flights to and from La Paz, Cochabamba and Cusco in Peru.

Joya Andina Airport features a 4,000 metres (13,000 ft) long and 45 metres (148 ft) wide asphalt runway, making it the airport with Bolivia's tied longest runway with El Alto International Airport in La Paz and Juan Mendoza Airport in Oruro.

The Uyuni VOR-DME (Ident: UNI) is located on the field.

== Airlines and destinations ==
Airlines	Destinations
Boliviana de Aviación	Cusco, Cochabamba, La Paz

== See also ==
- Transport in Bolivia
- List of airports in Bolivia
