= Shumkovo, Alexandrovsky District, Perm Krai =

Shumkovo Шумково
- Village
- Location within Perm Krai Location within Russia
- Coordinates: 57°22′N 57°22′E
- Country: Russia
- Region: Perm Krai
- District: Alexandrovsky District
- Time zone: UTC+5:00

Shumkovo (Russian: Шумково) is a rural locality (a village) in Vsevolodo-Vilvenskoye Urban Settlement, Alexandrovsky District, Perm Krai, Russia. The population was 4 as of 2010.

== Geography ==
Shumkovo is located 36 km west of Alexandrovsk (the district's administrative centre) by road. Garnovo is the nearest rural locality.
