= Benito Ramos =

Bolivian politician (born 1978)

- Official portrait, 2014

Member of the Chamber of Deputies from Potosí
- In office 19 January 2010 – 18 January 2015
- Substitute: Francisca Mamani
- Preceded by: José Pimentel
- Succeeded by: Esteban López
- Constituency: Party list

Personal details
- Born: Benito Ramos Calizaya; 21 March 1978 (age 48) Potosí, Bolivia
- Party: Movement Toward Socialism
- Education: Tomás Frías University (attended)
- Occupation: Mineworker; politician; trade unionist

Benito Ramos Calizaya (Note: In this Spanish name, the first or paternal surname is Ramos and the second or maternal family name is Calizaya.) (born 21 March 1978) is a Bolivian mineworker, politician, and trade unionist who represented Potosí in the Chamber of Deputies from 2010 to 2015.

Born in Potosí, Ramos became a mineworker and joined the Unified mining cooperative, known for its exploitation of Cerro Rico. He was a section delegate in the Forzados 1 mine from 1998 to 2000, and held office in the cooperative as its vice president from 2005 to 2006 and president from 2006 to 2008. In 2009, Ramos was elected president of the Departmental Federation of Mineworkers of Potosí.

The Movement Toward Socialism included Ramos on its list of candidates for parliament in the 2009 election. His nomination stemmed from the long-standing alliance between the party and mining cooperatives. Ramos held office for a single term and was not put up for reelection. He sought the presidency of the National Federation of Mining Cooperatives of Bolivia in 2015.

== Early life and career ==
=== Early life and education ===
Benito Ramos was born on 21 March 1978 in Potosí to Valeriano Ramos Mamani and Lucía Calizaya Tapia. He was raised in a single-parent household alongside two stepsiblings. Both his father and stepfather abandoned the family, leaving Ramos in the care of his mother, who worked as a merchant to make ends meet.

Ramos completed his basic and intermediate education at the Macedonio Nogales School and earned his baccalaureate from the Luis Espinal Camps School in 1995. He studied auditing at Tomás Frías University for two semesters but was unable to pursue further study. In 1996, Ramos entered mandatory military service in the 3rd Pérez Infantry Regiment.

=== Career and trade unionism ===
Ramos began working in mines as a child laborer. He toiled during school breaks to cover the costs of clothing and school supplies, and to support his mother and siblings. In 1997, following his discharge, he became a full-time mineworker. Like most laborers in the Bolivian mining industry, Ramos joined a mining cooperative. He became a member of Unified, one of the largest and most important cooperatives due to its operations within Cerro Rico.

In the Forzados 1 mine, Ramos held the post of section delegate from 1998 to 2000 and later headed the sports committee. He rose rapidly through the ranks of his cooperative, being elected vice president of Unified at its 2005 general assembly. He assumed the presidency in 2006, after the incumbent was elected to parliament. Ramos was the youngest mineworker to lead the cooperative. He was elected to a full term in 2007 and served until 2008.

In 2009, Ramos was elected president of the Departmental Federation of Mining Cooperatives of Potosí (FEDECOMIN), and was a leader in the National Federation of Mining Cooperatives of Bolivia (FENCOMIN). He led FEDECOMIN during a period of revitalization for the cooperative sector, driven by the 2000s boom in mineral prices.

== Chamber of Deputies ==
=== Election ===
The Movement Toward Socialism (MAS) courted mining cooperatives during its time in government, benefiting them with favorable regulations and even preferential treatment compared to state-employed mineworkers. In exchange for its political patronage, cooperative mineworkers became a bastion of support for the party. "We cooperativistas backed the MAS and the 'process of change', and had high hopes for Evo [Morales]", Ramos recalled.

The alliance between the MAS and mining cooperatives granted mineworkers a degree of representation in parliament. In 2009, Ramos was nominated for a seat in the Chamber of Deputies, capping the MAS list of candidates in Potosí Department. Fueled by massive mineworkers' support, the party won a decisive victory in the department, taking all of its proportionally allocated seats. Ramos was among several cooperative mineworkers elected to parliament in Bolivia's western regions.

=== Tenure ===
Ramos took office on 19 January 2010, and served as president of Potosí's parliamentary delegation from 2010 to 2011. His tenure coincided with mass demonstrations across the department demanding government action on regional grievances. In support of the protests, three MAS lawmakers from Potosí began a hunger strike in parliament. Though Ramos did not take part, he backed the measure. He helped push the administration to strike two contested articles of legislation; one that would have settled the department's border dispute with Oruro by referendum, and another that created an economic macroregion in southern Potosí. His intervention put Ramos at odds with peasant unions in the south, who accused him and other legislators of having "betrayed the MAS". Nevertheless, Ramos remained with the party, and led Potosí's MAS caucus from 2013 to 2014.

For the duration of his term, Ramos focused on initiatives favoring the cooperative sector. In 2014, a reformed mining bill drafted with input from cooperatives was presented to parliament. Before its passage, MAS lawmakers removed a provision permitting mining cooperatives to enter joint-venture agreements with private capital independently of the government. Ramos protested the amendment, arguing that requiring cooperatives to shift toward partnerships with the state would force them to terminate lucrative private contracts. In response, he backed protests against the changes. FENCOMIN ultimately relented, however, and endorsed the bill's passage, citing its commitment to support the government. FENCOMIN ratified its alliance with the MAS in that year's election. Though Ramos was not nominated for a second term, and left office on 18 January 2015, cooperative mineworkers remained represented in parliament.

=== Commission assignments ===
- Planning, Economic Policy, and Finance Commission
  - Financial, Monetary, and Insurance Policy Committee (2010–2011)
  - Budget, Tax Policy, and Comptroller's Office Committee (2012–2013)
- Plural Economy, Production, and Industry Commission
  - Mining and Metallurgy Committee (Secretary: 2011–2012)
  - Agriculture and Animal Husbandry Committee (2013–2014)
- International Relations and Migrant Protection Commission
  - International Relations, Migrant Protection, and International Organizations Committee (2014–2015)

== Later career ==
In September 2016, Ramos was among several candidates put forward by the mining cooperatives of Potosí for the presidency of FENCOMIN. Representing Unified, Ramos ran against René Arriola of the Huari Huari cooperative for the nomination of delegates from the city of Potosí. The victor faced other candidates at FENCOMIN's national congress in Cochabamba. Potosí's mining cooperatives sought to retain the presidency against contenders from other departments. Ultimately, David Morejón, representing southern Potosí, was elected president.

== Electoral history ==
Electoral history of Benito Ramos
Year	Office		Party	Votes			Result	Ref.
Year	Office		Party	Total	%	P.	Result	Ref.
2009	Deputies	L-1	Movement Toward Socialism	243,855	78.32	1st	Won	(Note: Presented on an electoral list. The data shown represents the share of the vote the entire party/alliance received in that constituency.)
Source: Plurinational Electoral Organ | Electoral Atlas

Chamber of Deputies of Bolivia
Preceded by José Pimentel	Member of the Chamber of Deputies from Potosí; 2010–2015	Succeeded by Esteban López
