= Mining in Bolivia =

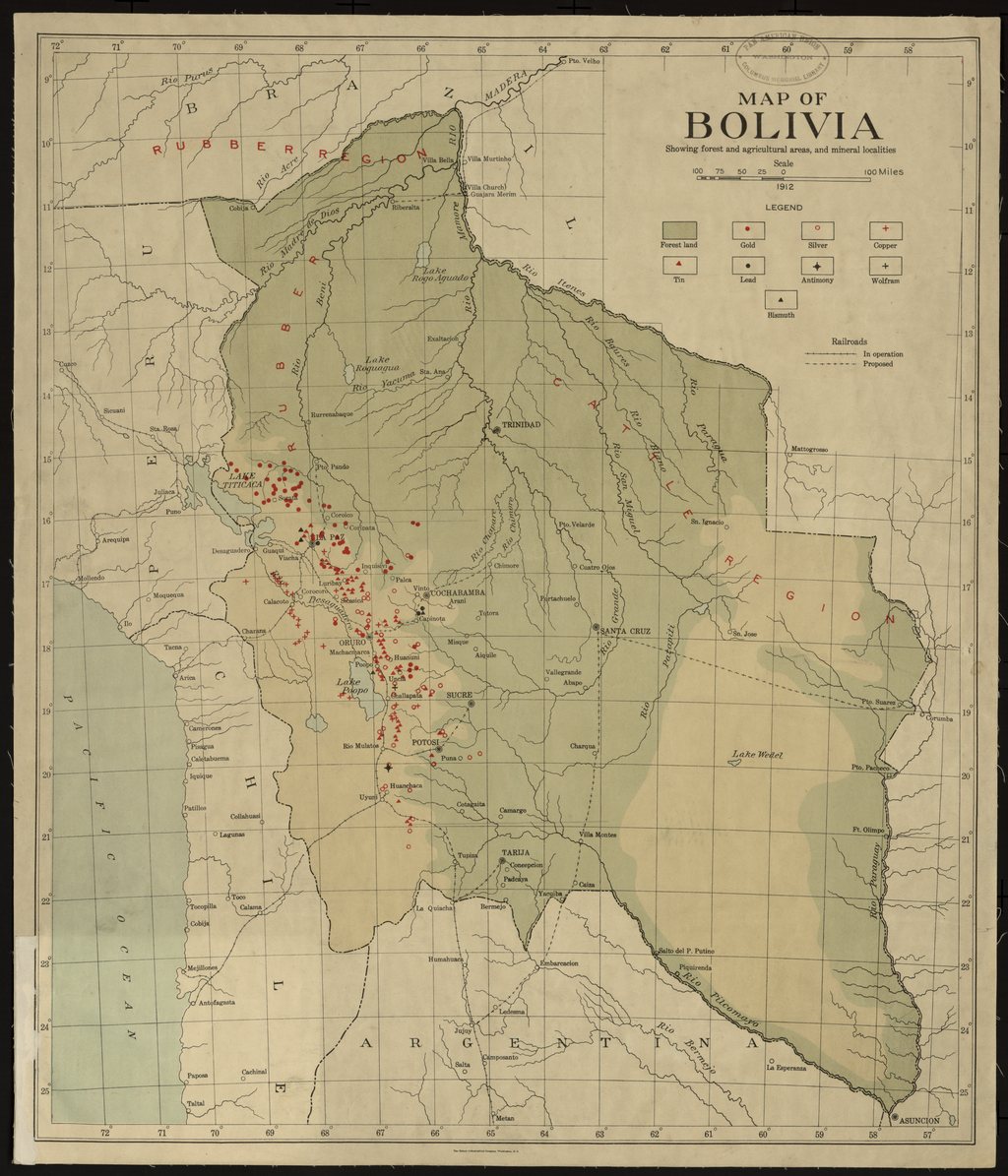
Map showing the location of European mines in Bolivia (1912).

Mining in Bolivia has been a dominant feature of the Bolivian economy as well as Bolivian politics since 1557. Colonial era silver mining in Bolivia, particularly in Potosí, played a critical role in the Spanish Empire and the global economy. Tin mining supplanted silver by the twentieth century and the central element of Bolivian mining, and wealthy tin barons played an important role in national politics until they were marginalized by the industry's nationalization into the Bolivian Mining Corporation (COMIBOL) that followed the 1952 revolution. Bolivian miners played a critical part to the country's organized labor movement from the 1940s to the 1980s.

By 1985, however, the production of every significant mineral in the country had failed to exceed the output registered in 1975. Moreover, the international tin market crashed in 1985. The mining sector in 1987 accounted for only 4 percent of GDP, 36 percent of exports, 2.5 percent of government revenues, and 2 percent of the labor force, compared with 8 percent of GDP, 65 percent of exports, 27 percent of government revenues, and about 6 percent of the labor force in 1977. Spurred by a massive increase in gold production, however, the mining sector rebounded in 1988, returning to the top of the nation's list of foreign exchange earners.

The crisis of 1985 prompted emergency economic measures by the government, including massive layoffs of miners. The twenty-first century has seen a recovery and expansion of the mining sector, and the government of Evo Morales has re-nationalized several facilities. However, as of 2010 mining in Bolivia is primarily in private hands, while the vast majority of miners work in cooperatives. Large, foreign owned mines such as Sumitomo's San Cristóbal mine also produce relatively large quantities of minerals. In 2010, 79,043 miners worked in the sector, producing $2.642 billion of mineral products.

In 2017, mining and quarrying activities accounted for 9% of the GDP. The mineral industry was estimated to have employed nearly 135,000 workers.

== Structure of the mining industry ==
The Ministry of Mining and Metallurgy is responsible for directing and developing the mining and metallurgical industries as well as implementation of policies and regulations for mining and metallurgical activities in the country.

The mining industry is organized into three main sectors: the government-owned sector, principally Comibol; the small mining cooperatives; and medium- and large-scale private enterprises. In 2013, private enterprises produced the largest share of minerals by mass and value. However, cooperative miners represent the vast majority of mining workers.

	2005			2013		
Sector	Quantity (fine metric tons)	Value (millions of US$)	Workers	Quantity (fine metric tons)	Value (millions of US$)	Workers
State	0	0	117	27,000	292	7,902
Private	182,000	347	5,450	581.000	2,112	8,110
Cooperative	108,000	283	50,150	124,000	982	119,340
Total	290,000	630		732,000	3,386	135,352
Source: President Evo Morales Ayma, Informe de Gestión 2013, p. 122, 138.

=== Comibol and the state sector ===
Corporación Minera de Bolivia (Comibol), created in 1952 by the nationalization of the country's tin mines, was a huge multi-mineral corporation controlled by organized labor and the second largest tin enterprise in the world, until it was decentralized into five semi-autonomous mining enterprises in 1986. In addition to operating twenty-one mining companies, several spare-parts factories, various electricity plants, farms, a railroad, and other agencies, Comibol also provided schooling for over 60,000 children, housing for mining families, health clinics, and popular subsidized commissaries called pulperías. By 1986 Comibol employed more non-miners than miners.

Observers severely criticized Comibol's mining policies. Comibol took fifteen years to bring tin production to its prerevolutionary levels. In addition, Comibol failed to invest sufficiently in mining technology and existing mines, and it proved unable to open new mines. Indeed, except for the mid-1960s Comibol did not engage in exploration. In terms of administration, worker control eclipsed even technical and detailed administrative decisions.

The decentralization of Comibol under the Rehabilitation Plan reduced the company's payroll from 27,000 employees to under 7,000 in less than a year. All of Comibol's mines, previously responsible for the bulk of mining output, were shut down from September 1986 to May 1987 to examine the economic feasibility of each mine; some never reopened. Comibol's mining and service companies were restructured into five autonomous mining subsidiaries (in Oruro, La Paz, Potosí, Quechusa and Oriente), and two autonomous smelting companies (the Vinto Smelting Company and the still unopened Karachipampa smelter in Potosí), or they were transferred to ministries such as the Ministry of Social Services and Public Health or the Ministry of Education and Culture. The bureaucracy also underwent major administrative changes.

The government of Evo Morales re-nationalized the cooperative mines at Huanuni (in 2007) and the smelting facilities in Vinto (in February 2007) and Karachipampa (in January 2011).

=== Private mining companies ===
For the first time since 1952, Comibol produced less minerals than the rest of the mining sector in 1987. The medium-scale miners consisted of Bolivian and foreign mining companies in the private sector that were involved in the production of virtually every mineral, especially silver, zinc, antimony, lead, cadmium, tungsten, gold, and tin. Nevertheless, the collapse of tin and the decline in other commodity prices in the mid-1980s also severely affected the private mining sector. Nineteen mining companies with 4,020 employees constituted the National Association of Medium Miners (Asociación de Minería Mediana) in 1987, compared with twenty-eight companies and 8,000 workers in 1985. Only 615 mines in 1987 were part of the National Chamber of Mining (Cámara Nacional de Minería), the equivalent of a small miners association, compared with 6,300 mines and 23,000 workers before the crash. Traditionally, small miners had to market their mining output through the Mining Bank of Bolivia (Banco Minera de Bolivia—Bamin), which was also restructured after 1985 into a joint venture of private and public interests. Beginning in 1987, small miners no longer had to sell their exports through Bamin, a policy shift that boosted that group's output and foreign sales.

=== Mining cooperatives ===
Mining cooperatives and other miscellaneous miners made up the rest of the producers in the mining sector, although their output was aggregated with that of the small mining sector. The National Federation of Mining Cooperatives of Bolivia (Federación Nacional de Cooperativas Mineras de Bolivia) served as an umbrella organization for the country's 434 mining cooperatives, 82 percent of which mined gold. Only a few of these groups, however, were officially registered with the National Institute of Cooperatives (Instituto Nacional para Cooperativas). Most cooperatives were small and consisted of individual miners organized by mine or specific mineral and using very little technology.

== Production ==
In 2019, the country was the 8th largest world producer of silver; 4th largest world producer of boron; 5th largest world producer of antimony; 5th largest world producer of tin; 6th largest world producer of tungsten; 7th largest producer of zinc, and the 8th largest producer of lead.

== Tin production ==
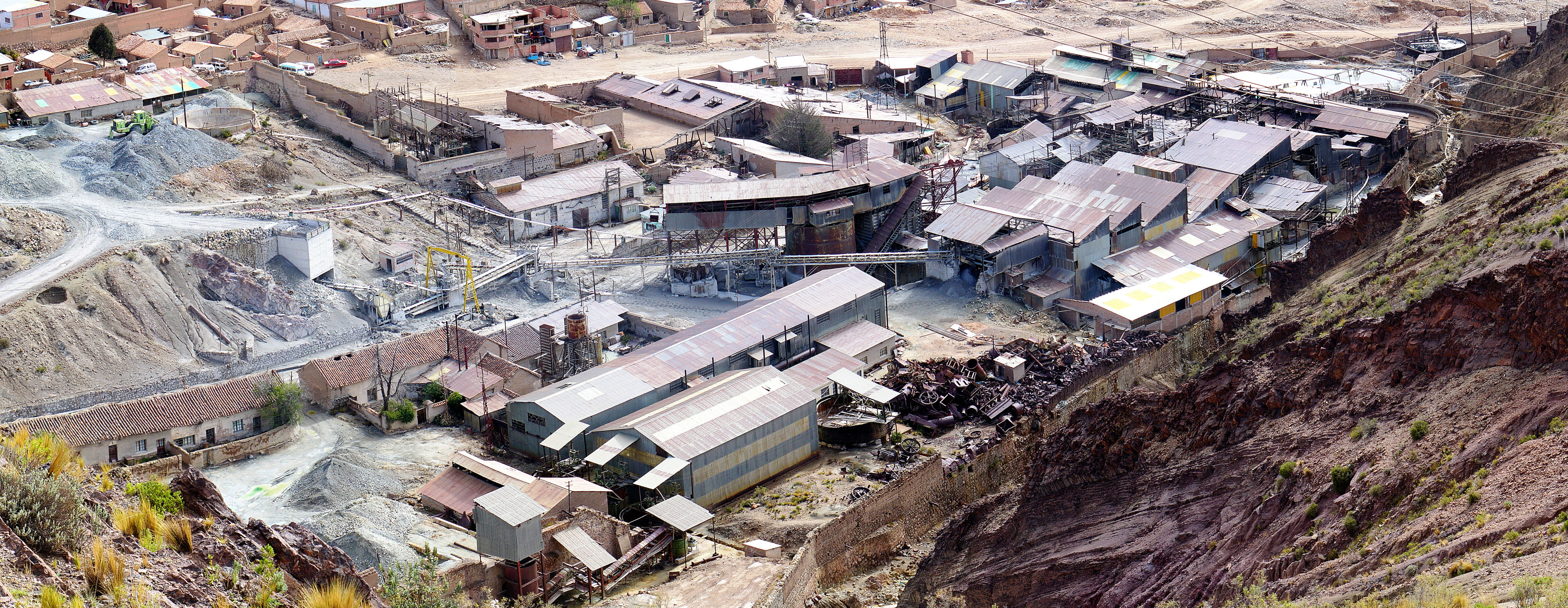
Mines in Potosi

Bolivia's mines had produced cassiterite, the chief source of tin, since 1861. Although long among the world's leading tin producers and exporters, the industry faced numerous and complicated structural problems by the early 1980s: the highest cost underground mines and smelters in the world; inaccessibility of the ores because of high altitudes and poor infrastructure; narrow, deep veins found in hard rock; complex tin ores that had to be specially processed to extract tin, antimony, lead, and other ores; depletion of high-grade ores; almost continual labor unrest; deplorable conditions for miners; extensive mineral theft or juqueo; poor macroeconomic conditions; lack of foreign exchange for needed imports; unclear mining policies; few export incentives; and decreasing international demand for tin. Between 1978 and 1985, Bolivia fell from the second to the fifth position among tin producers.

In the late 1980s, however, tin still accounted for a third of all Bolivian mineral exports because of the strong performance by the medium and small mining sectors. The largest tin-mining company in the private sector was Estalsa Boliviana, which dredged alluvial tin deposits in the Antequera River in northeastern Potosí Department. The Mining Company of Oruro operated the country's richest tin mine at Huanuni. The country's tin reserves in 1988 were estimated at 453,700 tons, of which 250,000 tons were found in medium-sized mines, 143,700 tons in Comibol mines, and 60,000 tons in small mines. In the late 1980s, tin was exported mainly in concentrates for refining abroad. Eighty percent of all exports went to the European Economic Community and the United States, with the balance going to various Latin American countries and Czechoslovakia.

Bolivia was a founding member of the International Tin Council (ITC), a body of twenty-two consumer and producer countries that since 1930 had attempted to regulate tin markets through buffer stocks. Bolivia, however, did not sign the ITC's International Tin Agreements in the 1970s and 1980s. In 1983 Bolivia joined the newly formed Association of Tin Producing Countries, which attempted—unsuccessfully—to control tin prices through a cartel approach to commodity regulation. After a period of decline, tin prices rebounded in the late 1980s. Government policies since the early 1970s had sought to expand the percentage of metallic or refined tin exports that offered greater returns. As a result, smelting increased during the 1970s, but in the 1980s the excessive costs of the nation's highly underutilized smelting operations contributed to the decision to restructure Comibol.

During the presidency of Evo Morales, Bolivia increased government control over and investment in the tin sector. At the Huanuni mines, violent clashes among cooperative miners led to nationalization of the facility in 2007. The government also nationalized the Vinto smelter citing issues of corruption by private owner Glencore in February 2007. The still-unopened Karachipampa was nationalized in 2011 following the regional protest in Potosí's demand for its operation and the failure of foreign investors to accomplish this. In July 2011, the Chinese firm Vicstar Union Engineering (a joint venture of Shenzhen Vicstar Import and Export Co. and Yantai Design and Research Engineering Co. Ltd of the Shandong Gold Group) won a contract to build a new smelter for Comibol at Huanuni.

== Other minerals ==
=== Silver and related minerals ===
Silver, zinc, lead, bismuth, and other minerals were all found with Bolivia's large tin reserves and, like tin, were considered strategic minerals. Because of the common mixture of ores, tin mining frequently encompassed the mining of other minerals as well. With the collapse of tin, the government was increasingly interested in exploiting its large reserves of other minerals, particularly silver and zinc. Three centuries after being the world's largest producer of silver, Bolivia still produced 225 tons of silver in 1988, as compared with about 140 tons in 1987. Zinc reserves were large, 530,000 tons, and the expansion of zinc production enjoyed growing government support. Zinc output also rose in the late 1980s from roughly 39,000 tons in 1987 to over 53,000 tons in 1988, compared with 47,000 tons in 1975. Nearly all zinc was exported. In 1987 the government declared the construction of a new zinc refinery in Potosí a national priority. Although the authorities considered lead a minor metal, production increased from 9,000 tons in 1987 to 11,000 tons in 1988. Bismuth reserves were estimated at 4,100 tons, and production in 1987 reached two-thirds of a ton entirely by small miners. Bolivia, the site of the International Bismuth Institute, was once the sole producer of bismuth in the world.

Among Bolivia's largest mining facilities is the San Cristóbal mining complex, an open-pit silver, lead and zinc mine near the town of San Cristóbal, Potosí. The mine, operated by Sumitomo Corporation, produces approximately 1,300 metric tons of zinc-silver ore and 300 tons of lead-silver ore per day, as of August 2010, by processing 40,000 to 50,000 tons of rock.

In the 2020s there have been plans for exploiting the silver deposit of Silver Sand northeast of Potosí.

=== Antimony ===
Bolivia holds about a fifth of the world's estimated total of 310,000 metric tons of antimony reserves. Private companies were responsible for all antimony production. The largest output came from the United Mining Company (Empresa Minera Unificada), which controlled the two largest antimony mines, located at Chilcobija and Caracota, both in Potosí Department. Medium and small miners generated an average of 9,500 tons of antimony a year in the mid-to late-1980s, all of which was exported. Antimony, a strategic mineral used in flameproofing compounds and semiconductors, was exported in concentrates, trioxides, and alloys to all regions of the world, with most sales going to Britain and Brazil.

=== Tungsten ===
Bolivia was also the leading producer of tungsten among market economies. But the dramatic decline in tungsten prices in the 1980s severely hurt production, despite the fact that reserves stood at 60,000 tons. Medium and small producers accounted for over 80 percent of the country's tungsten production in the late 1980s. The International Mining Company's Chojilla mine was the source of most tungsten output. Tungsten production sank from 2,300 tons in 1984 to barely more than 800 tons in 1987 because of falling international prices. Tungsten was sold to West European, East European, and Latin American countries, as well as to the United States.

=== Gold ===
Gold prospecting in the country's rivers and mines was brisk in the late 1980s. Because of Bolivia's vast territory and the high value of gold, contraband gold accounted for approximately 80 percent of exports. Official gold exports were approximately five tons in 1988, up sharply from less than one ton in 1985. In order to capture gold as a reserve for the Central Bank of Bolivia, in 1988 the government offered a 5 percent bonus over the international price of gold on local sales to the Central Bank. Gold was mined almost exclusively by over 300 cooperatives throughout the country, along with about 10,000 prospectors. A large percentage of the cooperatives worked in Tipuani, Guanay, Mapiri, Huayti, and Teoponte in a 21,000-hectare region set aside for gold digging and located 120 kilometers north of La Paz. Mining cooperatives in the late 1980s had requested an additional 53,000 hectares from the government for gold prospecting. Others panned for their fortunes in remote villages like Araras along the Brazilian border in Beni. Small-scale operations were very traditional and wasteful. Analysts predicted that more commercial production, such as the dredging of alluvial deposits, would maximize gold output. A few medium-sized mining operations, as well as the Armed Forces National Development Corporation (Corporación de las Fuerzas Armadas para el Desarrollo Nacional—Cofadena) became involved in the gold rush in the 1980s. Government policy favored augmenting gold reserves as a means of leveraging more external finance for development projects.

Republic Gold Limited, an Australian mining company ASX:RAU, are presently drilling for gold at Amayapampa Gold Project, 380 km South East of La Paz, on the Altiplano of South West Bolivia.

=== Lithium ===
The government's mineral policy also gave a high priority to exploiting the lithium and potassium deposits located in the brines of the southern Altiplano's Salar de Uyuni (Uyuni saltpan), estimated to be the largest of their kind in the world.

According to the United States Geological Survey, Bolivia's resources of lithium are estimated to be 9 million metric tons as of 2018. In 2017, a state-owned company Yacimientos de Litio Bolivianos (YLB) was created with the aim of extracting the lithium deposits and developing the lithium industry. In 2018 YLB chose ACI Systems GmbH as a partner for the development of Bolivia's lithium resources. The agreement between the parties included the construction of a plant for the production of lithium carbonate based on residual brine and of another plant for the production of industrial cathode materials and batteries. Despite the rising demand for lithium among the lithium battery producers, YLB has experienced difficulties in making lithium production commercially viable. In 2021, Bolivia produced just 540 tons of lithium carbonate.

=== Iron ===
After years of planning, the Mutún iron mine was scheduled to open its first of two plants in 1989. The Mutún mine, the sole responsibility of the Mining Company of the Oriente, was expected to yield 592,000 tons of iron in its first five years of operation. Mutún was also expected to produce manganese. The prospects for the steel industry, which was controlled by Bolivian Iron and Steel (Unidad Promotora de La Siderurgia Boliviana, formerly known as Siderúrgica Boliviana), however, were bleak. After more than a decade of planning a national steel plant, Bolivia was still unable to obtain financing for such a project, especially given international overcapacity in steel. The possibility of a national steel plant appeared unlikely at the end of the 1980s.

== Processing and smelting industries ==
The Vinto Smelting and Metallurgica Company (Empresa Metalúrgica y Fundidora Vinto) is a tin smelting facility in Oruro, opened in 1970. It was designed to process tin ore from mines including those at Huanuni and Colquiri. On 20 December 1999, it was privatized by the government of Hugo Banzer Suárez, who sold it to Allied Deals for US$14.7 million. The firm was re-nationalized on 9 February 2007.

The Karachipampa lead and silver smelting facility in Potosí was built to be the nation's largest smelter. Completed in 1984, Karachipampa employed Soviet technology but was constructed by a Federal Republic of Germany (West Germany) company. The smelter's gross capacity is an enormous 51,000 tons per year. Widely criticized for its overcapacity, the plant suffered continual delays due to insufficient ore inputs and lack of investment. In 2010, protests by the Potosí Civic Committee demanded its activation. Following Atlas Precious Metals' unsuccessful efforts to open and operate the plant, Comibol resumed control of the plant in January 2011. As of May 2011, Comibol promises to begin its operation in November; one-quarter of the production at the San Cristóbal mine is pledged as input to the facility.

== Labor conditions ==
Gold production represents 2,2% of the Bolivian economy. Zinc represents 13% and tin represents 5% of the country's economy. These three major products of the Bolivian mining industry are listed among those produced by child labor in the 2014 U.S. Department of Labor's report that included a List of Goods Produced by Child Labor or Forced Labor. The DOL has also reported that "children continue to engage [...] in the worst forms of child labor in mining" and that "child labor inspections remain insufficient relative to the scope of the problem."

== See also ==
- Bolivian miners' protest of 2007
- The Devil's Miner
- Thesis of Pulacayo
- Union Federation of Bolivian Mine Workers
- Corocoro United Copper Mines
- 1493: Uncovering the New World Columbus Created, for the importance of the silver mines at Potosi
