= Coro Coro =

Coro Coro may refer to:

- CoroCoro Comic, a Japanese manga magazine published by Shogakukan
- Corocoro cubano or corocoro grunt, a fish species in the family Haemulidae
- Coro Coro, Bolivia
- Corocoro United Copper Mines
- Corocoro Island, in the coast border between Venezuela and Guyana
- Karakoa, a kind of ship
