= Pseudomorph =

Mineral or mineral compound that appears in an atypical form

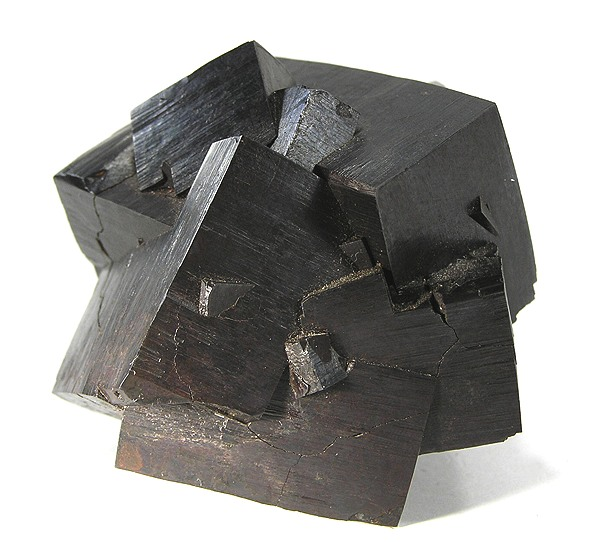
Pseudomorph of goethite after pyrite

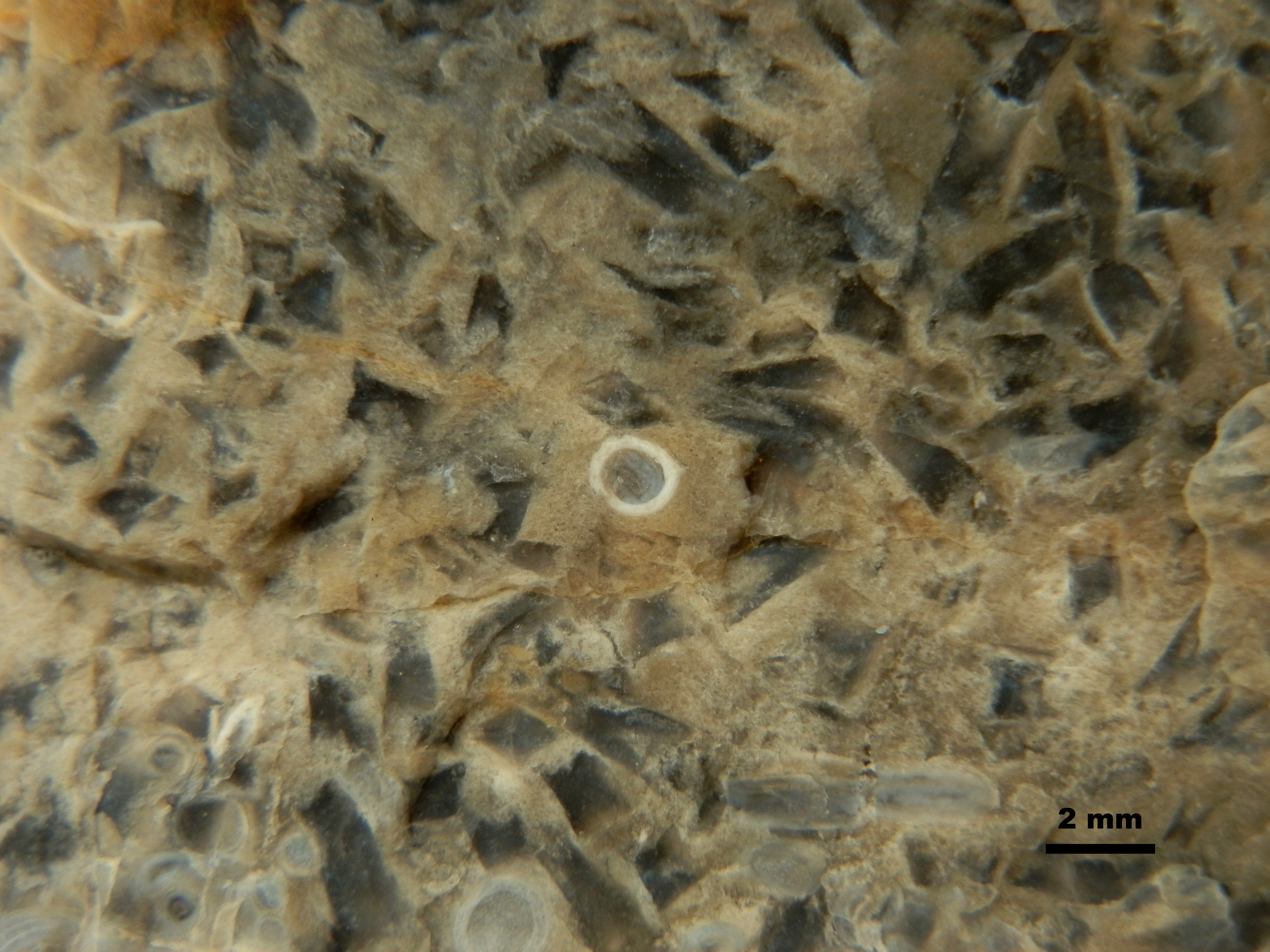
Silica pseudomorph after gypsum crystals and silicified serpulid polychaete tubes

In mineralogy, a pseudomorph is a mineral or mineral compound that appears in an atypical form (crystal system), resulting from a substitution process in which the appearance and dimensions remain constant, but the original mineral is replaced by another due to alteration, or chemical substitution, dissolution and refilling, structural changes or incrustation. The name literally means "false form". Terminology for pseudomorphs is "replacer after original", as in brookite after rutile. The term pseudomorphoses was initially used by Haüy.

== Substitution pseudomorph ==
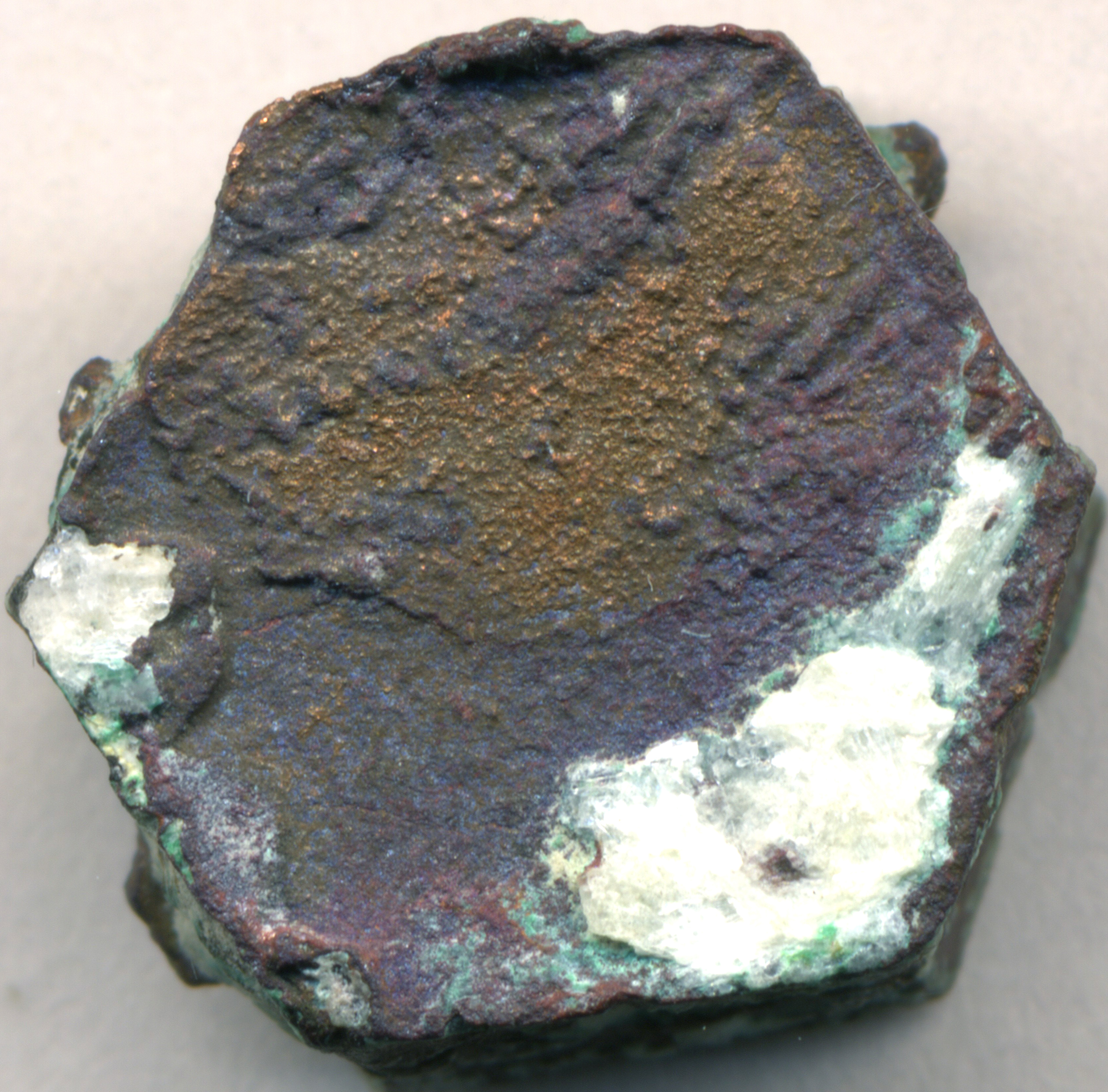
Native copper pseudomorph after aragonite, with red cuprite and green malachite alteration

A substitution pseudomorph is a pseudomorph in which one mineral or other material is replaced by another. The original shape of the mineral remains unchanged, but chemical composition, color, hardness, and other properties change to those of the replacing mineral.

This happens typically when a mineral of one composition changes by chemical reaction to another of similar composition, retaining the original crystalline shape. It can occur due to the loss of water or through the action of atmospheric agents, such as oxidation, hydration, or carbonation. An example is a change from galena (lead sulfide) to anglesite (lead sulfate) by oxidation. Pyrite crystals transformed into limonite, a compact mixture of iron oxides where goethite generally predominates, are common. In some cases, only partial replacement occurs. The resulting pseudomorph may contain an unaltered core of galena surrounded by anglesite that has the cubic crystal shape of galena.

== Infiltration pseudomorph ==
An example of this process is the replacement of wood by silica (quartz or opal) to form petrified wood in which the substitution may be so perfect as to retain the original cellular structure of the wood. An example of mineral-to-mineral substitution is replacement of aragonite twin crystals by native copper, as occurs at the Corocoro United Copper Mines of Coro Coro, Bolivia.

== Paramorph ==
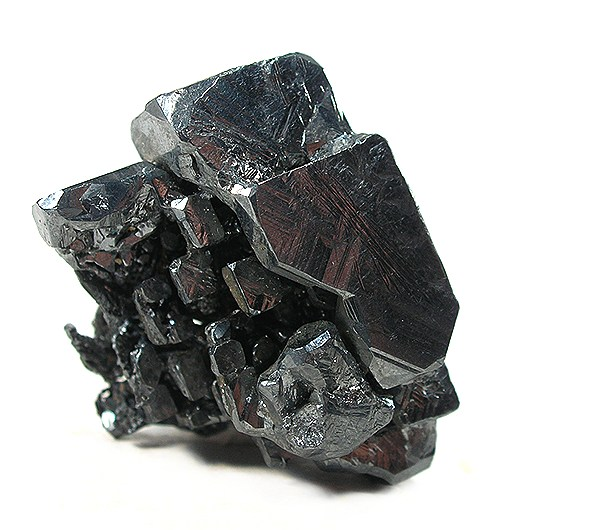
Cubic crystals of argentite transformed into acanthite (monoclinic), without any external visible change. Specimen from the San Juan de Rayas Mine, Guanajuato, Mexico. 3 cm.

A paramorph (also called allomorph) is a mineral changed on the molecular level only when the structure of a mineral transitions to a more stable polymorph. It has the same chemical composition, but with a different structure. For example, the cubic form of silver sulfide, argentite, does not actually exist below 173°C, and all are pseudomorphized into the monoclinic mineral acanthite. When the structure is very different, as in the aragonite and calcite, the unstable mineral can remains indefinitely in a metastable form, although transformation can occur under some conditions. Usually, the mineral looks identical to the original, unaltered form.

== Epimorph and incrustation pseudomorph ==
An incrustation pseudomorph, also called epimorph, results from a process by which a mineral is coated by another and the encased mineral dissolves. The encasing mineral remains, and retains the shape of the original mineral or material. Alternatively, another mineral may fill the space (the mold) previously occupied by some other mineral or material. Examples of quartz epimorph after calcite are found in the La Viesca Mine, Siero (Asturias), Spain.

== In other fields ==
Pseudomorphs are also common in paleontology. Fossils are often formed by pseudomorphic replacement of the remains by mineral matter. Examples include petrified wood and pyritized gastropod shells.

In biology, a pseudomorph is a cloud of mucus-rich ink released by many species of cephalopod. The name refers to the similarity in appearance between the cephalopod that released it and the cloud itself, in this context meaning literally "false body". This behaviour often allows the cephalopod to escape from predation unharmed, and is often performed as part of what is known as the blanch-ink-jet maneuver.

In philosophy, the concept of pseudomorphosis was used by the German philosopher Oswald Spengler to describe how the forms of an older, more widely dispersed culture affect the expression of forms of a younger, emerging culture. The latter develop into forms that are fundamentally alien to the culture's own world-feeling and thereby prevent it from fully developing its own self-consciousness.

In archaeology, organic pseudomorphs are impressions of organic material that can accumulate on the surface of metal artifacts as they corrode. They may occur when metal artifacts are buried in contact with organics under damp soil.

== See also ==
- Polymorphism (materials science)
