= Spinetta (disambiguation) =

Luis Alberto Spinetta (1950–2012) was an Argentine singer-songwriter.

Spinetta may refer to:

== People ==
- Dante Spinetta (born 1976), Argentine singer-songwriter
- Jean-Cyril Spinetta (born 1943), French businessman, Chairman and CEO of Air France-KLM

== Other uses ==
- Spinetta, a type of Italian virginals
