= El Morado =

Copper mine in Chile

- Location within Atacama Region Location within Chile
- Location: Coastal Cordillera, 40 km south of Freirina, Atacama Region, Chile; 28°52′19″S 71°07′34″W
- Products: Copper
- Opened: 1952
- Closed: 1973
- Company: Sociedad Capote Aurífero

El Morado (lit. "The Purple") is a largely inactive copper mine and mining district in Atacama Region, Chile.

== Discovery and activity ==
The copper ores of El Morado were discovered in the late 18th century and were mined through the 19th century.

El Morado's last cycle of mining began in 1952 when the mining company Sociedad Capote Aurífero led by the Callejas brothers began construction of processing facilities. The individual mines in El Morado worked in this period included Arenillas and Santo Domingo. In the early 1970s El Morado was restructured as a mining cooperative. Mining in El Morado halted after a fire burned its processing plant and storage facility on November 1, 1973. At its height El Morado employed more than 300 workers and about one thousand people lived in its vicinity. Following its closure El Morado became depopulated.

== Geology ==
The copper in El Morado is found in NE-oriented quartz veins whose thickness ranges from 30 to 100 cm. The ore minerals in these veins are chrysocolla, brochantite and chalcopyrite. In addition the veins contain magnetite, pyrite and specularite.

== Bibliography ==
- Álvarez Gómez, Oriel (1995). Huasco de cobre (in Spanish). Ediciones de la Universidad de Atacama. pp. 158–162.
