= Lycée Hoche =

Coordinates: 48°48′24″N 2°08′13″E

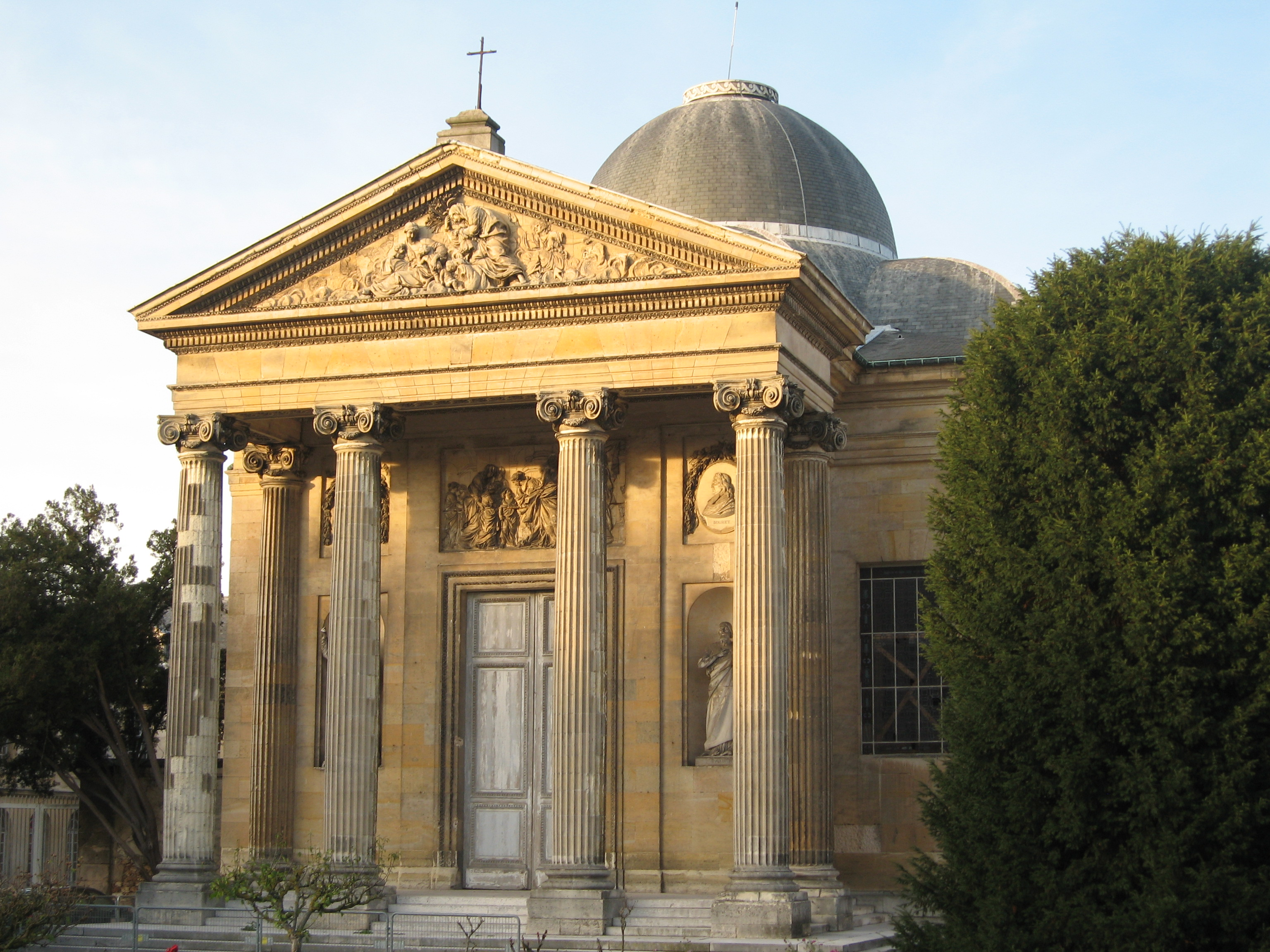

Address
- 73 Avenue de Saint-Cloud; Versailles; France

Information
- Established: 1803
- Director: Guy Seguin
- Website: http://www.lyc-hoche-versailles.ac-versailles.fr

The Lycée Hoche is a public secondary school located in Versailles, France. Formerly, it had been a nunnery founded by French queen Marie Leszczyńska. However, after the French Revolution, it became a school in 1803. In 1888, the school was named "Lycée Hoche" after the French general Lazare Hoche who was born in Versailles.

Together with Lycée Henri-IV, Lycée Louis-le-Grand, Lycée Saint-Louis, Lycée Stanislas and Lycée Sainte-Geneviève, the Lycée Hoche is one of the most prestigious secondary schools in France. Each year, many of the students coming from its preparatory classes are admitted to France's prestigious grandes écoles, such as the École Polytechnique, the École Normale Supérieure, HEC Paris and ESSEC Business School. Admission to Lycée Hoche is very competitive; the strict selection process is based on academic grades, drawing from middle schools (for entry into high school) and high schools (for entry into the preparatory classes) throughout France. Its educational standards are highly rated and the working conditions are considered optimal due to its demanding recruitment of teachers. Students generally achieve excellent results; topping national rankings for baccalauréat grades in high school and entry into the best grandes écoles in the preparatory classes.

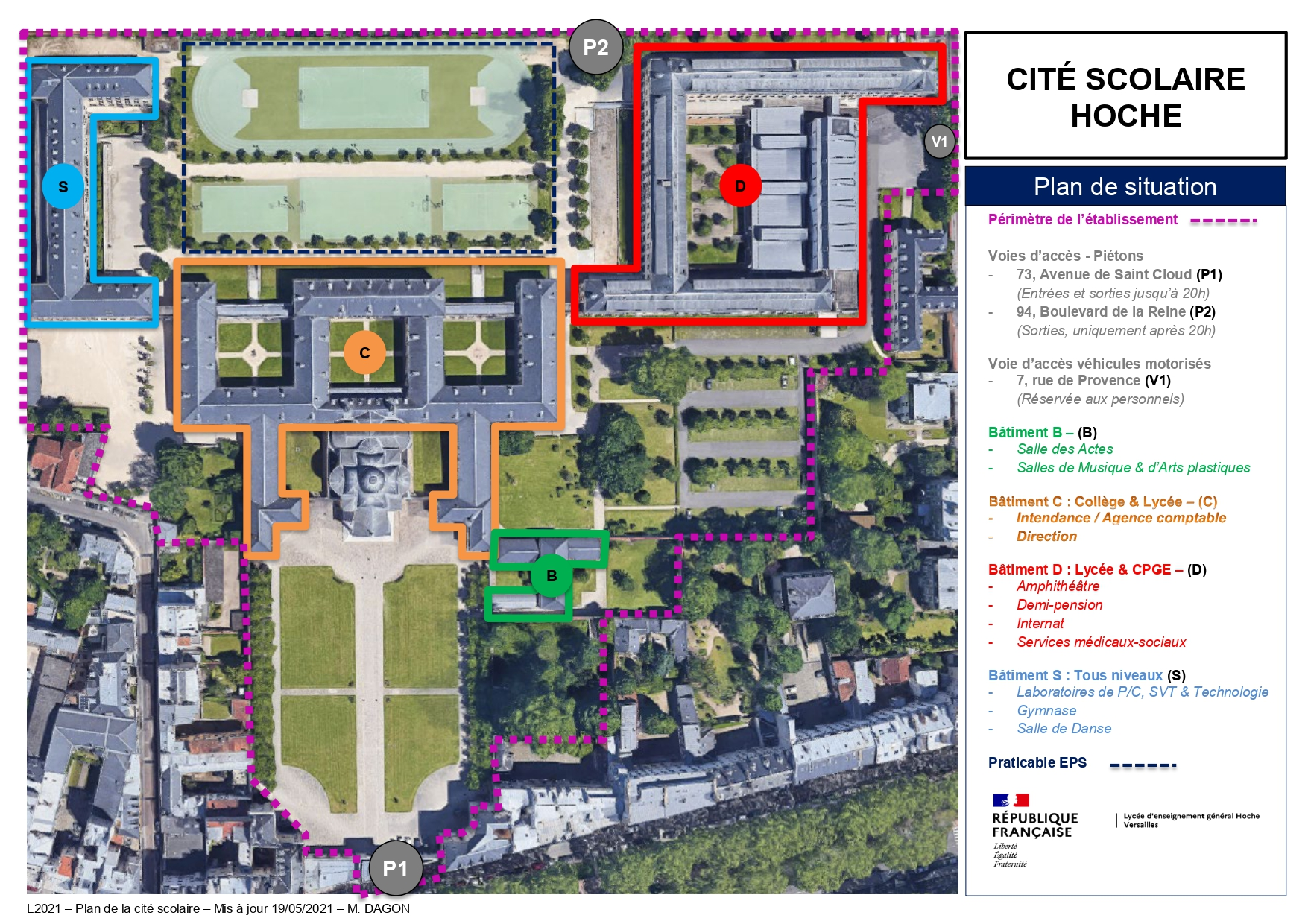
Map of the Lycée Hoche

The school consists of four buildings. The S building houses science classrooms and a large multi-sports gymnasium. In the C building are situated the literature, language, and mathematic classrooms. The C building was the former Queen's nunnery classified as a historical monument since 1926. The D building is where preparatory classes, history, and geography are located. Finally, the arts and music rooms are established in the B building.

The 200 years history of this school can be found in the 2010 book written by the French teacher Marie-Louise Mercier-Jouve: "Le lycee Hoche de Versailles, deux cents ans d'histoire" edited by Patrice Dupuy's editions, Paris.

== Famous alumni ==
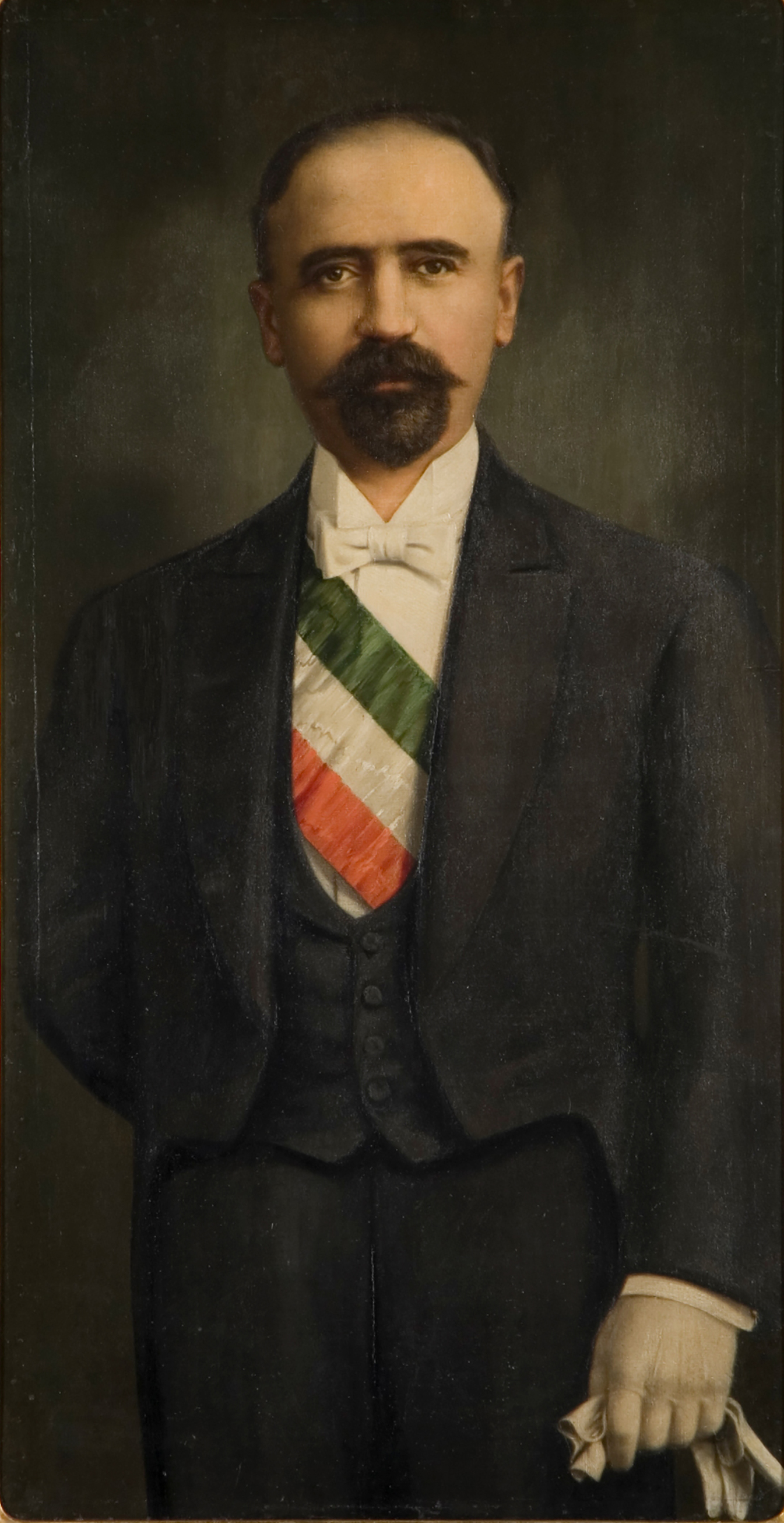
Francisco I. Madero, President of Mexico between 1911 and his assassination in 1913, was a key figure in the Mexican Revolution. He studied at the Lycée Hoche in the 1880s.

- Francisco I. Madero
- Raymond Aron
- Alain Berton (Chemist)
- Edward Carpenter
- Henri Cartan (Wolf Prize recipient)
- Pierre Clostermann
- Jean-Marie Colombani
- Barthélemy Prosper Enfantin
- Louis Franchet d'Espèrey
- Louis Halphen
- Jules Antoine Lissajous
- Charles Mangin
- Philippe Morillon
- Duško Popov
- Jean-Cyril Spinetta
- alternative rock Phoenix (band)
- Louis Valtat
- Boris Vian
- Wendelin Werner (Fields medalist)
- Dr. Daniel Choukroun

== See also ==
- Lycée Henri-IV
- Lycée Louis-le-Grand
- Secondary education in France
- Education in France
