= Jean-Cyril Spinetta =

- Born: 4 October 1943 (age 82); Paris, France
- Education: Lycée Hoche
- Alma mater: Sciences Po, ÉNA
- Occupation: Former CEO of Air France-KLM

Jean-Cyril Spinetta (born 4 October 1943) is a French businessman and former chairman of the airline holding company Air France-KLM and chairman of the nuclear company AREVA.

== Early life and formation ==
Spinetta was born in the 15th arrondissement of Paris, the son of Corsican and Italian parents. He attended the Lycée Hoche in Versailles; then the Faculty of Law at the University of Paris. He was also graduated from Sciences Po (Institute for Politics Studies), entering after his degree at the École Nationale d'Administration (National School of Administration) in 1972.

== Career ==
After several jobs in different ministries, he became the chairman and CEO of the former airline Air Inter in 1980. In 1997, Spinetta was appointed chairman and CEO of Air France; then of Air France-KLM in 2003. He was also chairman, in 2004–2005, of the International Air Transport Association (IATA).

Spinetta is also member of the board of directors of Alitalia, Italy's main airline and SkyTeam member, in which Air France owns a 25% stake.

Jean-Cyril Spinetta was replaced by his COO Pierre-Henri Gourgeon on 1 January 2009, and was elevated to the post of CEO.

Spinetta retired from Air France on 1 July 2013. He bore primary responsibility for Concorde's premature retirement in 2003.
