= Child labor in Bolivia =

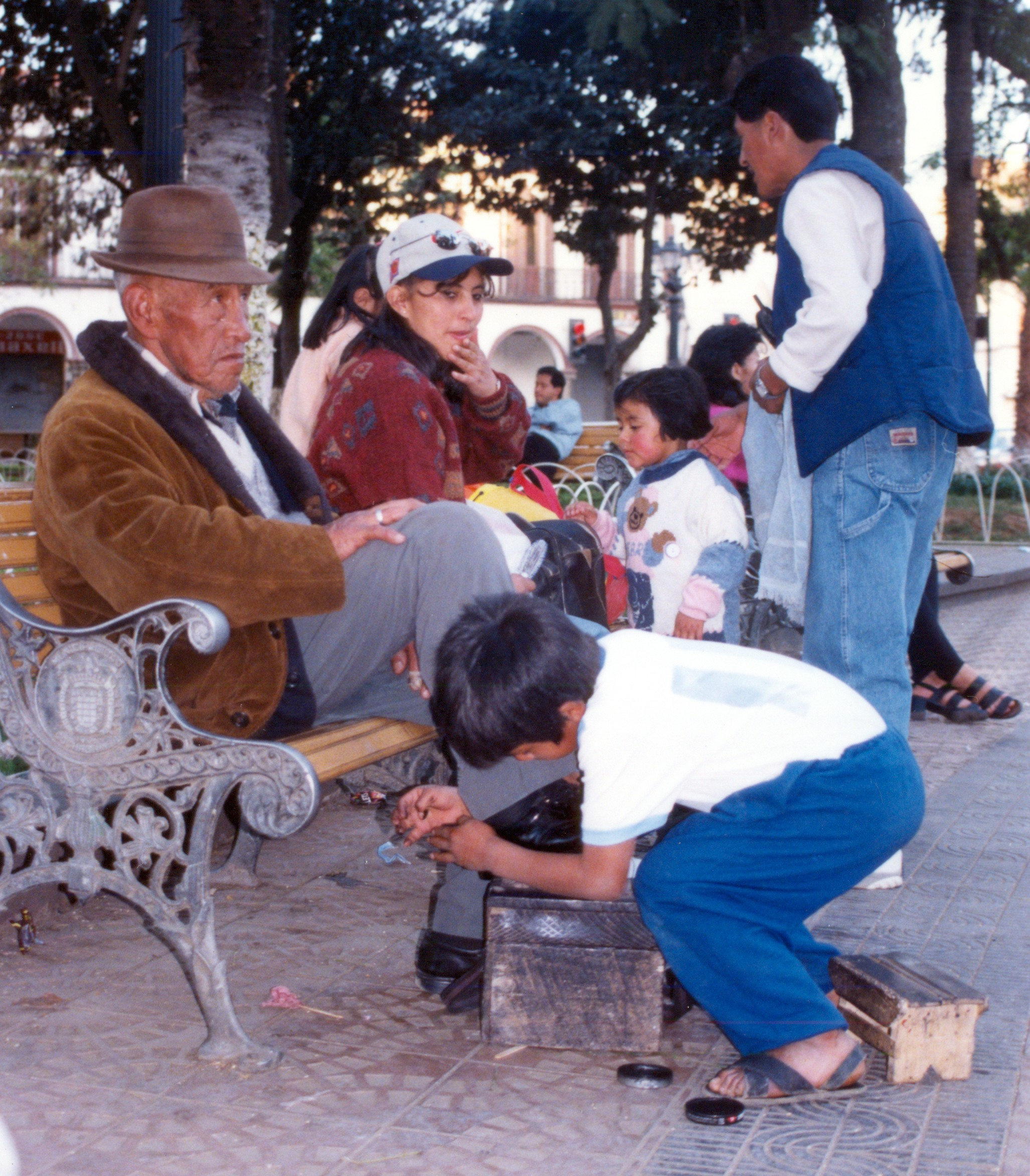
Shoe-Shine Boy in Bolivia

Child labor in Bolivia is a widespread phenomenon. A 2014 document on the worst forms of child labor released by the U.S. Department of Labor estimated that approximately 20.2% of children between the ages of 7 and 14, or 388,541 children make up the labor force in Bolivia. Indigenous children are more likely to be engaged in labor than children who reside in urban areas. The activities of child laborers are diverse, however the majority of child laborers are involved in agricultural labor, and this activity varies between urban and rural areas. Bolivia has ratified the United Nations Convention on the Rights of the Child in 1990. Bolivia has also ratified the International Labour Organization’s Minimum Age Convention, 1973 (138) and the ILO’s worst forms of child labor convention (182). In July 2014, the Bolivian government passed the new child and adolescent code, which lowered the minimum working age to ten years old given certain working conditions The new code stipulates that children between the ages of ten and twelve can legally work given they are self-employed while children between 12 and 14 may work as contracted laborers as long as their work does not interfere with their education and they work under parental supervision.

== Definitions ==
The International Labour Organization defines child labor as work that “deprives children of their childhood, their potential and their dignity and that is harmful to their mental and physical development.”

UNICEF defines children as engaging in child labor as those between the ages of 5 and 11 who participate in one hour of economic activity or 28 hours of domestic activity a week, and those between 12 and 14 who participate in at least 14 hours of economic activity or 28 hours of domestic work a week.

== Types of work ==
A large percentage of child laborers, about 70.9% are employed in the agricultural sector, working in activities such as planting and harvesting corn, working on cattle ranches, and planting and harvesting chestnuts and sugarcane. In rural areas children begin working at a young age, and participate in activities on small-scale farms and on medium and large plantations doing activities such as sowing, harvesting, weeding, and caring for cattle. Children who work in subsistence agriculture are exposed to harmful chemicals and are obligated to work for long hours, which reduces their ability to receive an education Work on plantations is more difficult than work on small-scale farms, and children are exposed to more pesticides and hazardous working conditions which may result in infections and physical injuries from use of farm equipment. Mining in Bolivia is a common activity carried out by child laborers in rural areas, and the ILO has estimated that around 13,500 children are involved in mining. Work in mines is divided along age and gender lines, with girls and younger children involved in less dangerous work such as washing clothes and searching for minerals outside of mining sites while only boys work in actual mines in more dangerous work involving the use of explosives and the grinding of minerals In urban areas, children are involved in agriculture but are mainly involved in jobs in industry and service which include domestic labor, woodwork, vending, and prostitution. Work in urban areas is divided along gender lines with girls mostly carrying out jobs in markets or domestic labor while boys do more physically strenuous labor in construction sites or working in garages, and children who work in domestic labor and on the streets are more susceptible to physical, verbal and sexual abuse as there is little protection for these children. Children involved in the worst forms of child labor such as mining, child prostitution, and strenuous plantation work live in deplorable living conditions and have limited access to sanitary water and good healthcare.

== Causes ==
=== Poverty ===
Bolivia is one of the poorest countries in South America, with 45% of its population living below the poverty line. Poverty is a major cause of child labor in Bolivia, and children from poor families work in order to support the well-being of their families and to supply their basic needs of survival. Low living standards combined with low educational attainment increases poverty rates and the prevalence of child labor. UNICEF reports that a family’s access to financial credit influences the likelihood of children working, as greater access to financial credit reduces the chances of children working, and of children working in more dangerous occupations.

=== Education ===
Lack of access to an education is a major cause and consequence of child labor. A study carried out by Jiménez and Vera concerning disparities in educational attainment in Bolivia found that a gap exists between urban and rural areas, with children in urban areas having a higher rate of primary education completion and access to an education. The ILO reports that the percentage of children who are not enrolled in school is 2.5%, with a higher percentage of rural children being out of school. A study carried out by Zapata, Contreras and Kruger (2011) found that gender and ethnicity plays a role in the relationship between child labor and educational attainment in Bolivia. They found that girls are 51% more likely to not be enrolled in school and to be working, mostly in domestic occupations, and indigenous children are 60% more likely to not be enrolled in school and to be working. Access to high-quality education can be very limited, as is the number of secondary schools available to students especially in rural areas. The educational attainment of parents influences the likelihood of children working, and the higher the level of educational attainment of parents, the lesser the likelihood of children participating in economic activities. Parents with lower educational attainment were likely child laborers themselves and value working more highly than receiving an education. The high cost of education for poor families results in the decision to have their children participate in the labor force

=== Cultural ===
The causes of child labor are not only to economic depravity but also to cultural reasons. In Andean culture, work is seen as an important agent of socialization for children as it is an integral part of their inclusion into the wider community, and it enables them to learn traditional societal values. Work is important to the social organization of indigenous communities, where children work in order to contribute to the cohesiveness of family units and while the whole community works together to protect children The cultural cause of child labor is related to definitions of children and childhood. Western concepts of childhood define children as vulnerable and helpless and lead to attempts to abolish child labor in order to protect children. According to Hanson and Vandaele (2003), child laborers disagree with the Western perspective of childhood and claim their right to work in dignity as social agents in society

== Initiatives against child labor ==
In the UNICEF Bolivia country program (2013-2017), they have pledged to increase technical support to management and monitoring systems social services that protect children from abuse and sexual exploitation. The program seeks to improve overall children’s overall access to social services and to protest children’s rights.

The ILO’s International Programme on the Elimination of Child Labor (IPEC) works in Bolivia to combat child labor through promotion of equitable access to education through research and statistics on the impact of child labor on educational attainment and monitoring of the worst forms of child labor.

The Bolivian Ministry of Education has undertaken initiatives to improve the educational attainment of child laborers including an "accelerated leveling program" for child laborers who are behind in school.

The Centro de Promoción Minera is a non-governmental organization in Bolivia committed to improving the quality of life for child workers and their families in Bolivia. They do this by ensuring that the children have adequate access to food and education, and their parents have access to work opportunities.
