= Potosinista Civic Committee =

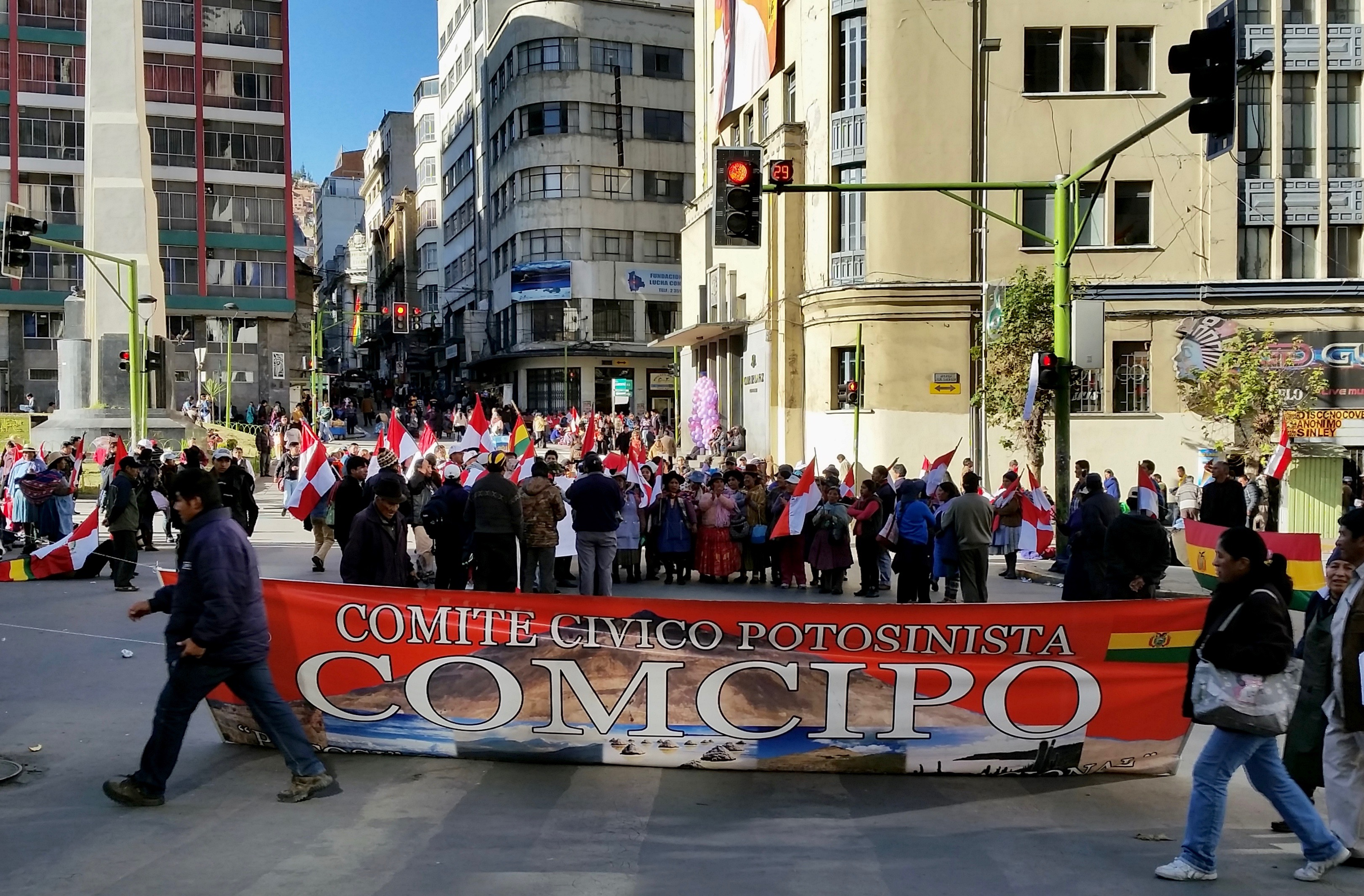
Protesters from the Potosí Civic Committee blockade central streets in La Paz, Bolivia, as part of a 2015 demonstration

The Potosinista Civic Committee (Spanish: Comité Civico Potosinista; COMCIPO) is a political organization representing indigenous people and rural workers in the department of Potosí, Bolivia. It was established on August 2, 1976, in response to fears that the region's natural resources were being exploited by foreign corporations. It is made up of representatives of different civic institutions of the department.

== Governance and leadership ==
Comcipo is governed by a committee of officers elected on a common slate. These include a President, two Vice Presidents, two General Secretaries, fourteen Secretaries on specific issues, and two spokespeople. They are elected by 193 delegates representing the fifty-one organizations that make up Comcipo, with thirty-one unions or organizations having three votes each and twenty federations having five votes each.

The most recent elections, held on 21 January 2011, were a three-way contest between incumbent president Celestino Condori's Potosí Rebellion 19 (Spanish: 19 Rebeldía Potosinista) slate, Walter Ramírez's Red and White slate, and Mario Navarro's Autonomous Potosí Civic Organization slate. Potosí Rebellion 19 won with the support of eighty-seven of the 193 votes. The Federation of Cooperative Miners protested the election, arguing that numerous participants in the 2010 strike were excluded from the leadership slates. Condori has endorsed enlarging the organization and popular elections, and offered to cut short his term to hold new elections following restructuring.

In the previous election on 20 August 2008, the Potosí Unity Front (Spanish: Frente de Unidad Potosinista), led by Enrique Leytón and including Condori, won with ninety-four of 169 votes.

While the slate elected in January 2011 is scheduled to have a two-year term, no Elections Committee had been designated as of December 2012. Consequently, the current leadership's mandate is expected to continue several months into 2013.

=== Representation of the provinces ===
Despite several attempts to enlarge to the entire department of Potosí, Comcipo remains an urban organization. Congresses were called by Comcipo to integrate rural organizations in 1998, 2008, and 2010, but failed to achieve results.

== Agenda ==
During the July–August 2010 civic strike, Comcipo advanced a six-point set of demands:

1. Delimitation of the inter-departmental border between Quillacas (Oruro) and Coroma (Potosí)
2. Installation of a cement plant in the Coroma region.
3. Begin production of the Karachipampa metallurgy plant
4. Preservation of the Cerro Rico mountain outside Potosí
5. Installation of an international airport as soon as possible
6. Attention to delayed road construction

In January 2011, Condori announced that Comcipo would press for regional ownership of shares in any lithium extraction enterprise working in the Salar de Uyuni and for the industrialization of lithium within the department of Potosí. He also called for a recall referendum on Bolivian Vice President Álvaro García Linera.

Negotiations between Comcipo and the local and national governments broke down in November 2012. Minister of the Presidency Juan Ramón Quintana announced he would not negotiate further with the current leadership of Comcipo. In response, the organization announced it would begin a recall campaign challenging a number of elected officials to a referendum, as allowed in the middle of their five-year terms. In December 2012, their requests to recall the Mayor of Potosí, the city's council members, and two members of the national Chamber of Deputies—David Cortéz (Social Alliance party) and Juan Carlos Cejas (MAS-IPSP)—were authorized by electoral officials.

== See also ==
- Photographs and videos of the 2010 strikes
