= National Federation of Mining Cooperatives of Bolivia =

Bolivian trade union federation

- Federación Nacional de Cooperativas Mineras de Bolivia
- Abbreviation: FENCOMIN
- Established: 1968
- Type: National trade union federation

The National Federation of Mining Cooperatives of Bolivia (Spanish: Federación Nacional de Cooperativas Mineras de Bolivia; FENCOMIN) is a trade union federation in Bolivia that represents cooperative mineworkers. It was established in 1968 after cooperativistas began to outnumber salaried mineworkers employed by the Mining Corporation of Bolivia. FENCOMIN often operates in competition with the Trade Union Federation of Mineworkers of Bolivia, though both were aligned with the Movement Toward Socialism during its time in government.
