= Bolivian miners' protest of 2007 =

In early 2007 members of Bolivia's mining co-operatives took to the streets to protest a proposed tax by the government of Evo Morales. The gravity of the situation was compounded as some threw sticks of lit dynamite.

== Background ==
Bolivia's mineral deposits are the property of the state. The government runs mines in a few areas through the state mining company Comibol. The co-operatives are only allowed to mine if they are granted a concessions from the central government. Upon agreement concessions can also be granted to international mining firms such as U.S.-based Coeur d'Alene Mines and Apex Silver Mines, Ltd. In October 2006 co-op miners were involved in violence with miners from the state sector over control of a pewter mine which resulted in 16 deaths. Part of the ICM tax hike is to fund hiring more co-op miners into the state-owned mining company Comibol in an attempt to ensure that such violence does not repeat.

== Response to proposed tax ==
On Tuesday, February 6, 2007, parts of the Bolivian region of La Paz were brought to a standstill as 20,000 miners took to the roads and streets to protest a tax hike to the Complementary Mining Tax (ICM) by the Morales government. The miners were drawn from small independent co-operatives, many of whom still mine with hammers and chisels.

== The protest march ==
The protesting miners threw dynamite and clashed with those passing by. The march continued into the Bolivian capital, with the dynamite sending "booming explosions echoing through the streets". The state run newspaper ABI said that the dynamite throwing was done “at the same time and in locations where children were ending their school day”. Police seized “some 284 sticks of dynamite, along with hundreds of detonators and rolls of fuse”, all of which are openly and easily available for sale within Bolivia.

== Political positions ==
=== Morales government ===
The Morales government had implemented a tax increase because it was hoping to recoup $83 million in unpaid mining taxes. The government is also seeking to increase this tax income "to as much as $300 million" due to increased international demand for its natural resources. Morales has also stated that his goal is to nationalize Bolivia's entire mining sector, of which this tax increase is seen as a first step. The Morales government had maintained that the "tax increase would be relatively minor for the cooperatives". The Morales government had attempted to head-off the demonstration by announcing on February 5, 2007, that the tax increase was not directed at the 50,000 miners who are co-op members but at larger private mining companies. His government announced that the cooperatives' taxes would be "frozen at current levels until further notice". This did not dissuade the thousands of protestors who had already gathered nearby the capital in the less affluent city of El Alto.

=== Miners ===
The miners see the tax as an effort to control their lives. Their strong support was one of the factors leading to Morales’ 2005 victory and in the past they have been instrumental in causing the resignation of Bolivian presidents. Besides chanting, whistling, and throwing explosives the miners were also demanding the resignation of Bolivian Mining Minister Guillermo Dalance. They demanded the government "focus on the mineral dealers who buy and sell their ore" and not on their labor. The miners position was advocated by the leader of the National Federation of Mining Cooperatives (known by its Spanish acronym Fencomin), Andres Villca who told the media "We have asked the government not to impose this tax. Instead, we have asked them to look for a way to control the sale of the minerals, which is the fundamental part." He declared that they would never allow a 20% increase in the ICM tax. Villca stated "We are protesting against the complementary mining tax that the Minister of Mines wants to charge us, in addition to the percentage that he is already taking from us." Villca also told reporters that the “fight of the mining cooperative members goes beyond the same Mining Complementary Tax”, they also opposed provisions of the Mining Code, which do not specify areas that can be leased for mining concession.

== Call for calm ==
Morales’ interior minister Alfredo Rada said that the tax freeze “seems reasonable to us. We hope that this proposal will not continue to be met with intolerance and irrational actions like those of the ... miners this morning.”
