= Mining cooperative =

Group operating a mine

A mining cooperative is an association of persons that operates a mine. Mining cooperatives have been promoted as means to combat unemployment and provide poverty alleviation. The formation of mining cooperates is recommended by the International Labour Organization as a step to eliminate child labour in artisanal mining. Mining cooperatives have been found to often have problems addressing environmental concerns due to low levels of knowledge among members, plausible impunity, and little development in local communities.

== In Bolivia and Chile ==
In Bolivia, the spread of mining cooperatives dates to the 1930s while in Chile, mining cooperatives became common in the late 1960s and early 1970s when a series of mines were reorganized as worker's cooperatives, including Dulcinea, El Morado, and some mines in Andacollo. In Bolivia, about 60,000 miners are organized into cooperatives.

== See also ==
- Cerro Rico
- Illegal mining in Peru
- Pallaqueo
- Pirquinero
