= Corocoro United Copper Mines =

Copper mine in Bolivia

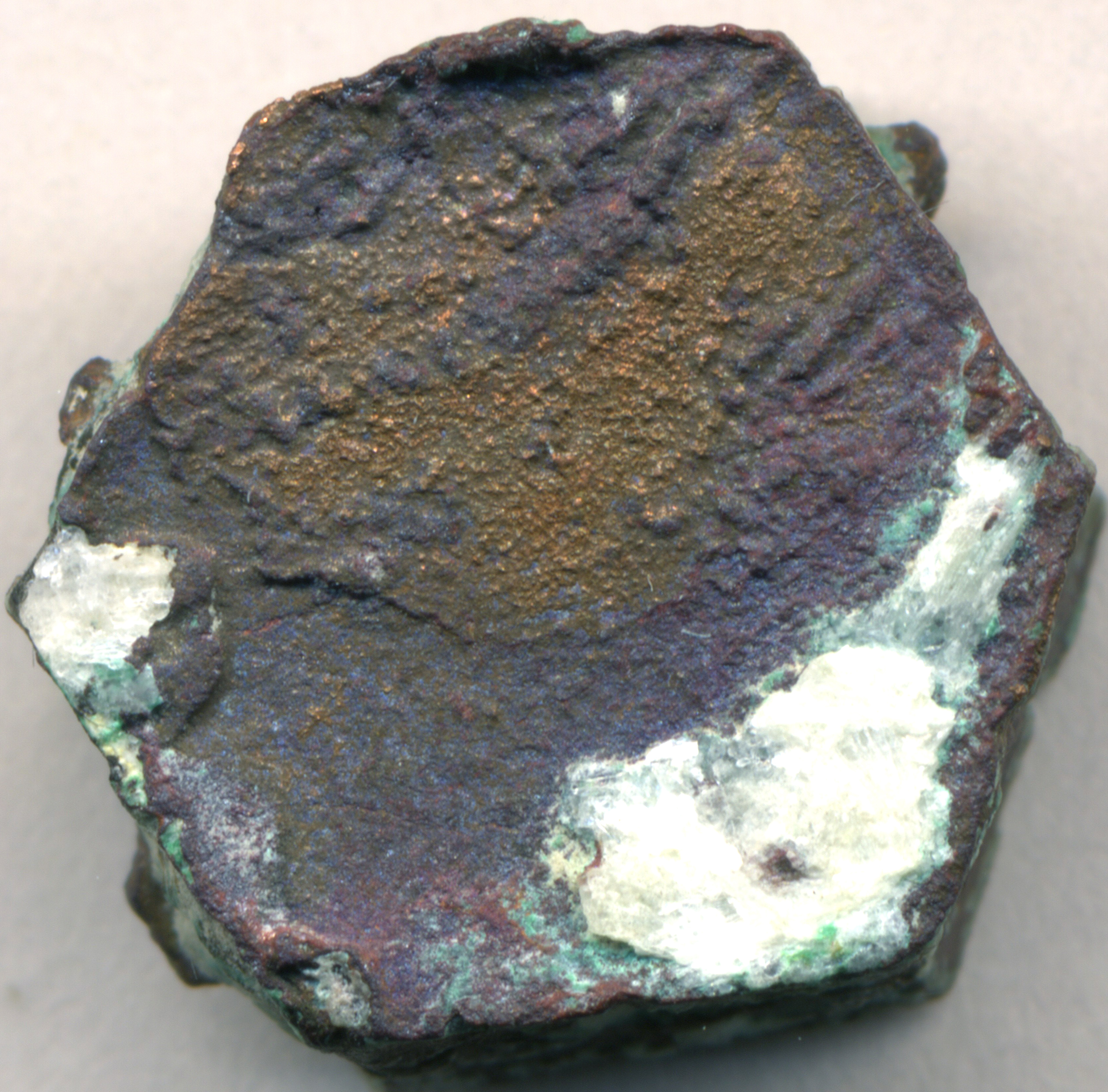
Native copper pseudomorph after aragonite, Corocoro

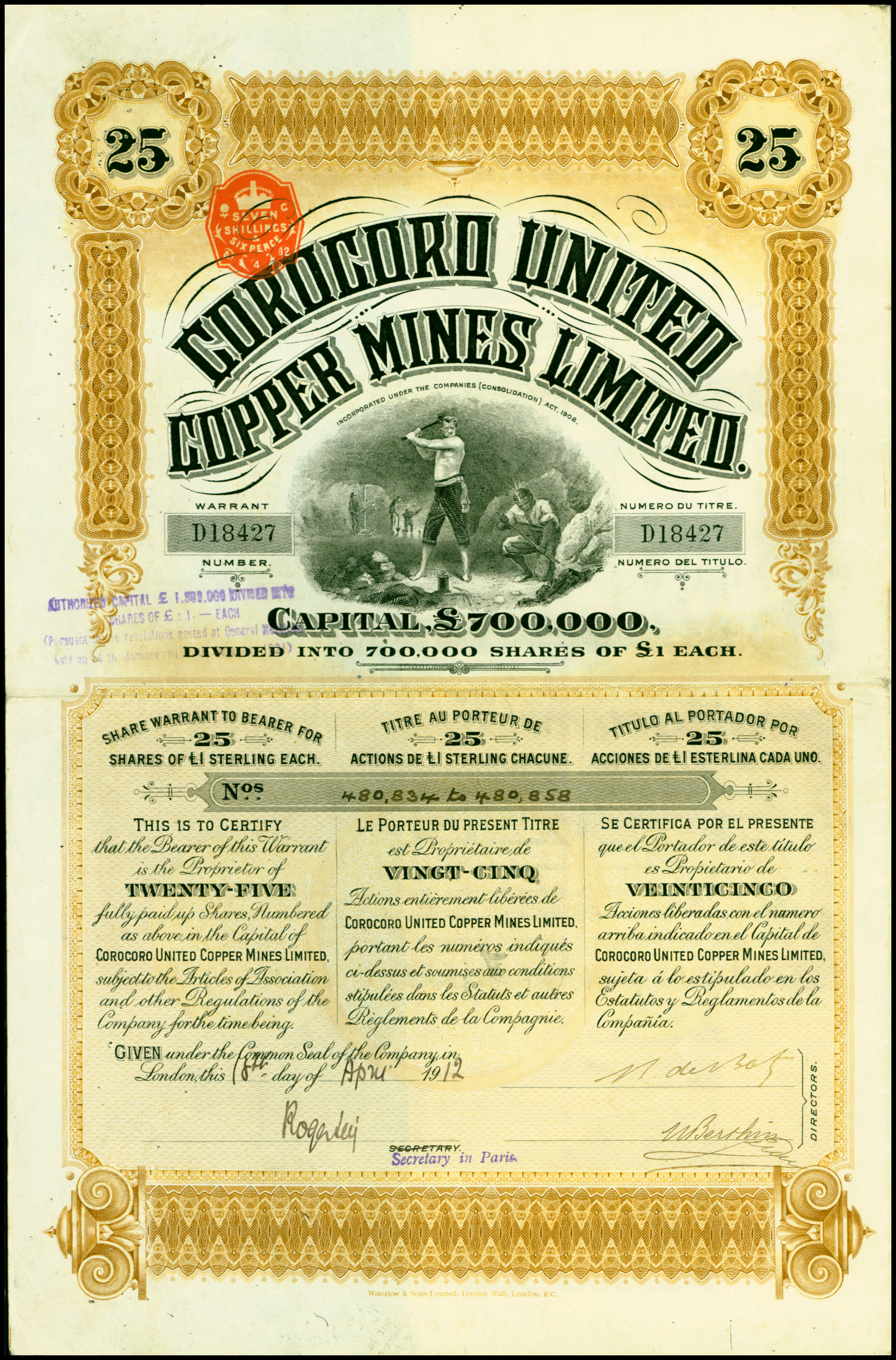
Share of the Corocoro United Copper Mines Ltd, issued 8. April 1912

The Corocoro United Copper Mines, Ltd. was the largest copper mine in Bolivia, an honor previously held by Compania Corocoro de Bolivia. The corporate office was at 151 Finsbury Pavement House, London, England, while the mine office was at Coro Coro, Bolivia. It was organized August 6, 1909 under the laws of Great Britain. The lands included 515 claims in the Coro Coro district. The principal mines were the Wisk'achani, formerly owned by J. K. Child & Co., Ltd.; the Santa Rosa, formerly owned by Carreras Hermanos; and the Guallatiri, formerly owned by the Succession Noel Berthin. The mines were opened on two successive conglomerate strata of different geological horizons, and similar only in their origin and cupriferous nature. The mines are believed to have been worked by the Incas. The nearest water supply was the Rio Desaguadero, 14 miles (23 km) away, down which the copper was shipped by way of Puerto de Desaguadero, and from there to Mollendo, Chile, for export to Europe.
