= Coro Coro, Bolivia =

Coro Coro
- Town
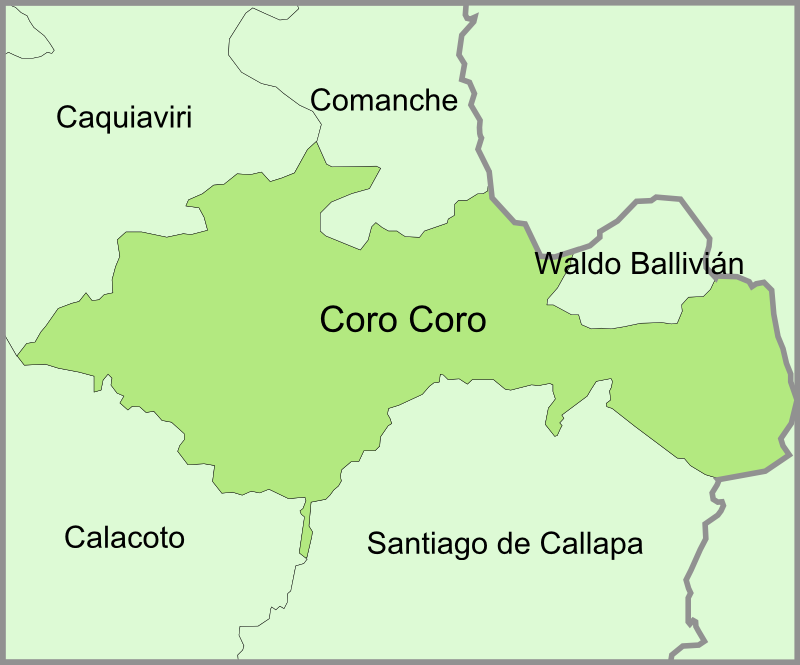
- Municipality

- Location within Bolivia
- Coordinates: 17°10′S 68°27′W
- Country: Bolivia
- Department: La Paz Department
- Province: Pacajes Province
- Municipality: Coro Coro Municipality

Population (2012)
  - Total: 10 647
- Time zone: UTC-4 (BOT)

Coro Coro (Aymara: Kuru Kuru) is a small town in the La Paz Department in Bolivia. It is the seat of the Coro Coro Municipality, the first municipal section of the Pacajes Province, and it is the seat of the province. Coro Coro, also known as Corocoro, was one of the most important mining areas in Bolivia because of its copper deposits and was home to the Corocoro United Copper Mines. That changed after 1985 when due to various economic and political reasons the mining center was closed and its workers left the area. Since then, the development of the town has been stagnant. Coro Coro contains in its territory several natural heritage landmarks, such as Kuntur Jipiña, the salt lake of Jayuma Llallawa and the church of Qaqinkura (Caquingora).

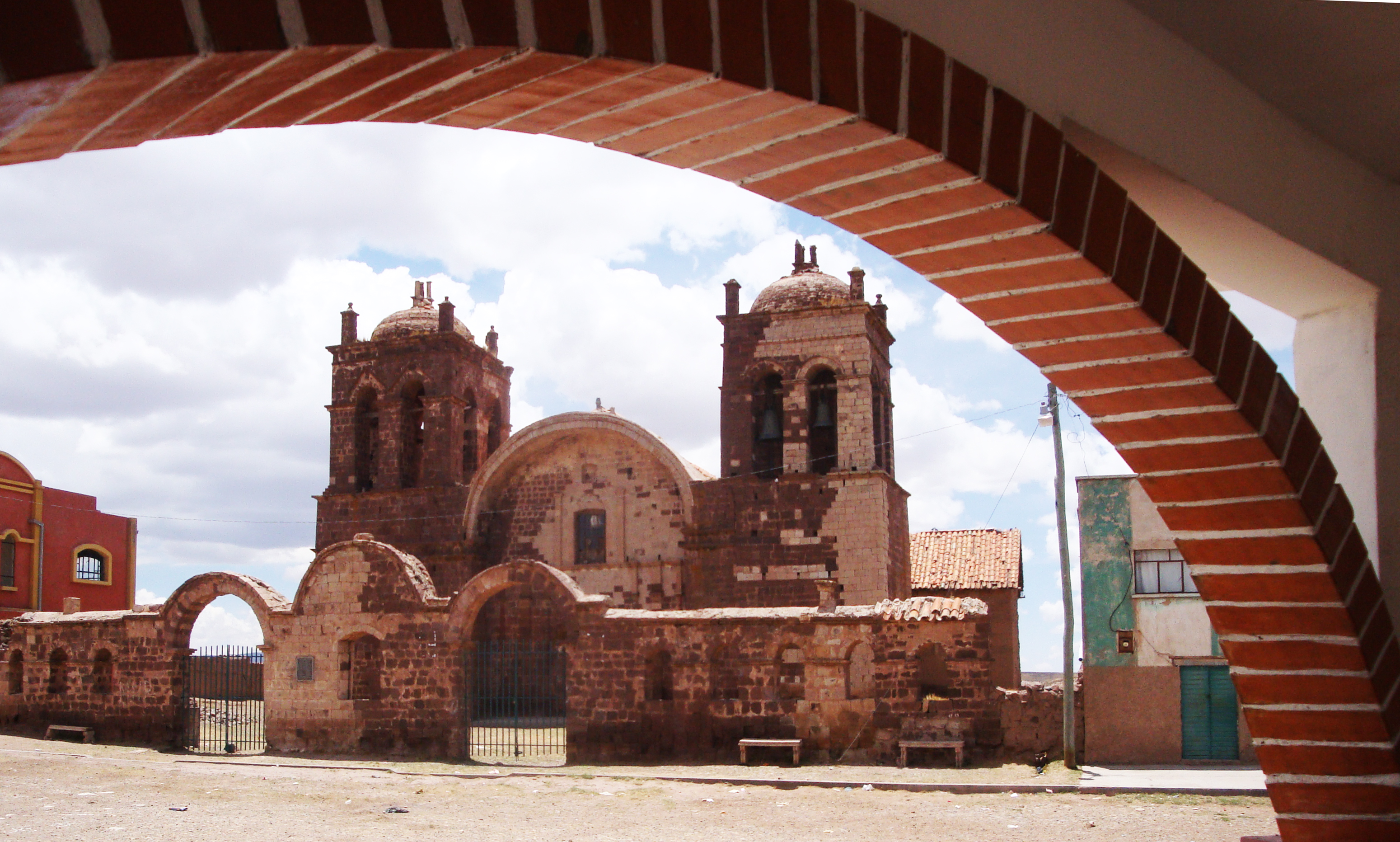
Caquingora Church

== See also ==
- Corocoro United Copper Mines
