= Carmen García (politician) =

Bolivian politician (born 1963)

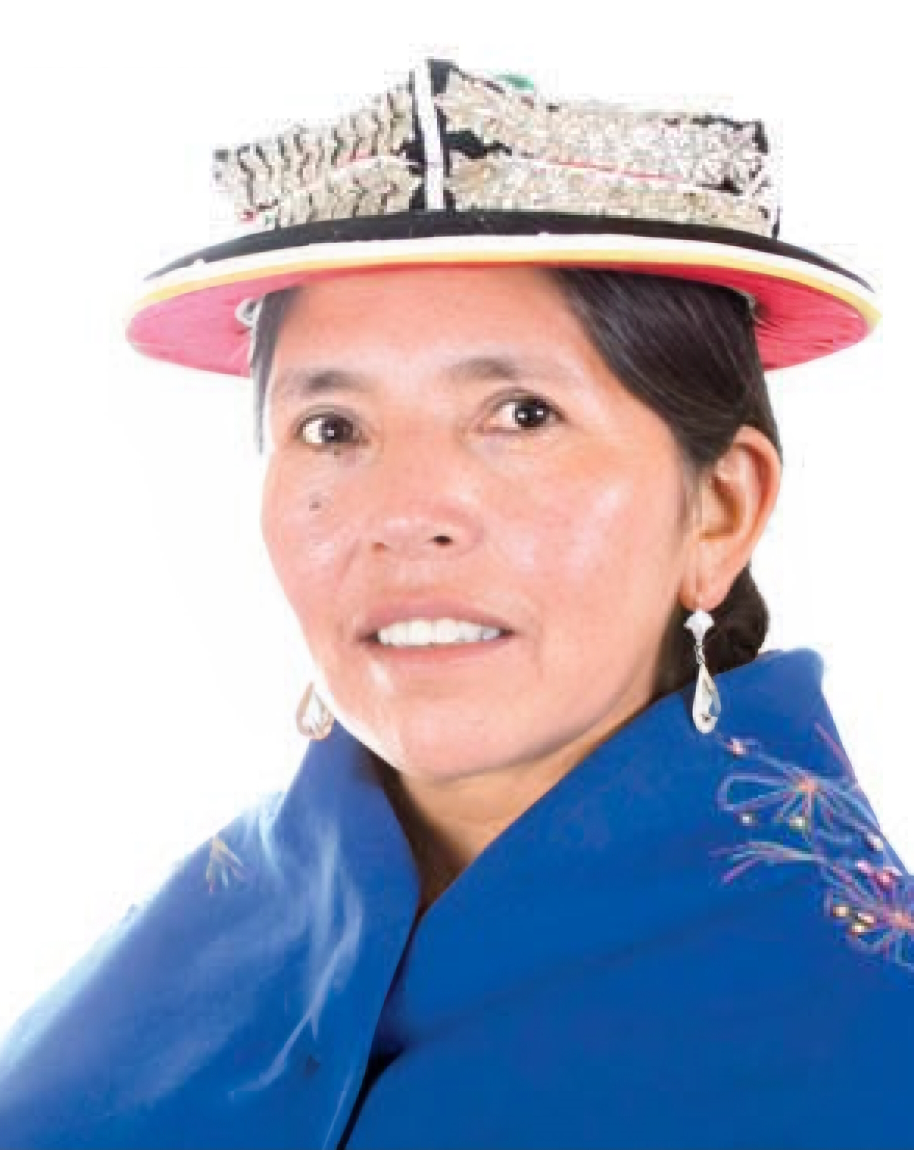
- Official portrait, 2012

Senator for Potosí
- In office 19 January 2010 – 18 January 2015
- Substitute: Julio Villegas
- Preceded by: Carmen Rosa Velásquez
- Succeeded by: Adela Cussi

Personal details
- Born: Carmen García Mamani; 16 July 1963 (age 63) Yonsa, Potosí, Bolivia
- Party: Movement for Socialism
- Education: Franz Tamayo Normal School
- Occupation: Educator; politician; trade unionist

Carmen García Mamani (born 16 July 1963) is a Bolivian academic, politician, and trade unionist who served as senator for Potosí from 2010 to 2015. A member of the Movement for Socialism, she previously served on the Tomave Municipal Council from 2000 to 2005.

An ethnic Quechua, García worked for over a decade as a schoolteacher in rural Potosí. She later studied educational management at multiple universities, finally settling on a career in teacher training and indigenous language research. In tandem, García actively operated within the trade syndicates of her home region, through which she began a career in politics as a member of the Movement for Socialism.

Elected to the Tomave Municipal Council in 1999, García later won a seat in the Senate in 2009, representing Potosí. Over the course of her tenure, García grew disgruntled with the often hierarchical structure of her caucus and ultimately joined a group of "free thinking" ruling party dissidents that depleted the government's parliamentary supermajority. She was not nominated for reelection.

== Early life and career ==
Carmen García was born on 16 July 1963 in Yonsa, a hamlet in the Campos Province of western Potosí. She spent most of her early life in nearby Quijarro Province, residing in Tocora, a community situated in one of the many ayllus that make up the Uyuni valley. An ethnic Quechua, García was raised monolingual, speaking only her native tongue until reaching primary school, where she was made to learn Spanish. She completed her primary studies at the 1 de Mayo School in Tocora before moving back to the Campos Province to finish her secondary education.

García graduated as a primary school teacher from the Franz Tamayo Normal School in Llica. She taught at educational institutions in and around southwest Potosí for over fifteen years. In tandem, she also pursued instruction in educational management. Taking advantage of the enhanced training opportunities conferred to teachers by the education reform of 1994, García attended courses in multiple cities. She graduated with a bachelor's in intercultural bilingual education from Tomás Frías University and a master's in the same field from the Higher University of San Simón, in addition to receiving a second bachelor's in educational management from Juan Misael Saracho University.

After graduating, García settled in Cochabamba, where she dedicated herself to a career in teacher training at the Paracaya Normal School in addition to doing research work in the fields of indigenous and second languages. During this time, between 2007 and 2008, she completed a postgraduate diploma in indigenous rights at Cochabamba's Simón I. Patiño University.

== Chamber of Senators ==
=== Election ===
Alongside her work in education, García actively participated in her region's trade syndicates and social movement organizations, holding membership in the Uyuni affiliate of the Unified Regional Federation of Rural Workers of Southwest Potosí. The organization's early association with the nascent Movement for Socialism (MAS) facilitated García's entry into politics, starting out in 1999, when she was elected to a seat on Tomave's municipal council.

In 2009, García's syndicate nominated her for a seat in the Plurinational Legislative Assembly, and the MAS, in turn, incorporated her onto its slate of Potosí Senate candidates. The decision to designate her to a high Senate position was driven by the implementation of a fifty percent female gender quota, which first took effect this election cycle. As a result of this requirement, García joined the largest delegation of peasant women ever elected to parliament up to that point. Uniquely, she was the only newly elected senator not to succeed a man in the position; her predecessor, Carmen Rosa Velásquez, had been the sole female senator elected in 2005.

=== Tenure ===
With the expressed mission of making Bolivia a benchmark country on the topic, García's senatorial term focused on her field of expertise: education. She chaired the Senate's Education Committee in her first year, overseeing the initial stages of reviewing and passing 2010's landmark Avelino Siñani Educational Law, which implemented a new system of education, with special emphasis on indigenous and traditional knowledge. That bill, notably, was approved by parliament without any modifications from the original draft delivered by the executive, reflecting – from García's perspective – the MAS's rigid internal hierarchy, which often discouraged legislators from challenging the party line.

Over the course of her tenure, the inability of legislators "to participate at all" in decision-making led García to grow disaffected with her party. By 2013, she had joined the ranks of the so-called "freethinkers", a small faction of MAS dissidents that assumed a critical stance toward the government without fully aligning with the conservative opposition. Though a majority of the group's members came from the Chamber of Deputies, they also counted the support of a few senators, including García, but also her regional colleague, Eduardo Maldonado, as well as Pando's senator, Manuel Limachi. García's break with the ruling party was not without consequences; in 2013, she was expelled from her committee seat, ostensibly due to coordination issues, and by the end of her term, she was not nominated for reelection.

=== Commission assignments ===
- Chamber of Senators Directorate (Third Secretary: 2011–2012)
- State Security, Armed Forces, and Bolivian Police Commission
  - State Security and Fight Against Drug Trafficking Committee (Secretary: 2013–2014)
- Plural Economy, Production, Industry, and Industrialization Commission
  - Energy, Hydrocarbons, Mining, and Metallurgy Committee (Secretary: 2012–2013)
- Social Policy, Education, and Health Commission
  - Education, Health, Science, Technology, and Sports Committee (Secretary: 2010–2011, 2014–2015)

== Electoral history ==
Electoral history of Carmen García
| Year | Office | Party | Votes | | | Result | Ref. |
| Year | Office | Party | Total | % | P. | Result | Ref. |
|---|---|---|---|---|---|---|---|
| 1999 | Substitute councillor | Movement for Socialism | 212 | 9.50% | 5th | Won | (Note: Presented on an electoral list. The data shown represents the share of the vote the entire party/alliance received in that constituency.) |
| 2009 | Senator | Movement for Socialism | 243,855 | 78.32% | 1st | Won | |
Source: Plurinational Electoral Organ | Electoral Atlas

== Publications ==
- García Mamani, Carmen (2011). "La descolonización en la construcción de la política educativa". In Navarro, Mónica (ed.). Estrategias para una educación superior descolonizadora intra e intercultural (in Spanish). Cochabamba: FUNPROEIB Andes. pp. 79–96.
- ——————————— (2014). "Pluralismo epistemológico en perspectiva indígena". In Zambrana B., Amílcar (ed.). Pluralismo epistemológico: Reflexiones sobre la educación superior en el Estado Plurinacional de Bolivia (in Spanish). Cochabamba: FUNPROEIB Andes. pp. 151–162. ISBN 978-99954-874-4-7. OCLC 885219963.

Senate of Bolivia
| Preceded by Carmen Rosa Velásquez | Senator for Potosí; 2010–2015; Served alongside: Eduardo Maldonado, Efraín Condori, Clementina Garnica | Succeeded by Adela Cussi |
| Preceded by Clementina Garnica | Third Secretary of the Senate; 2011–2012 | Succeeded by David Sánchez |
