= Cerro Candelaria =

Mountain in Bolivia

Candelaria
- Location within Bolivia

Highest point
- Elevation: 5,995 m (19,669 ft)
- Coordinates: 19°45′S 68°41′W

Geography
- Location: Bolivia, Potosí Department, Daniel Campos Province
- Parent range: Andes

Candelaria is a mountain in the Andes of Bolivia. It has a height of 5,995 metres (19,669 ft). It is situated in the Potosí Department, Daniel Campos Province, Llica Municipality, Chacoma Canton, north east of Alto Toroni and south of Alto Totoni.

== See also ==
- Iru Phutunqu
- List of mountains in the Andes
