= Waylla (Bolivia-Chile) =

Mountain in Bolivia

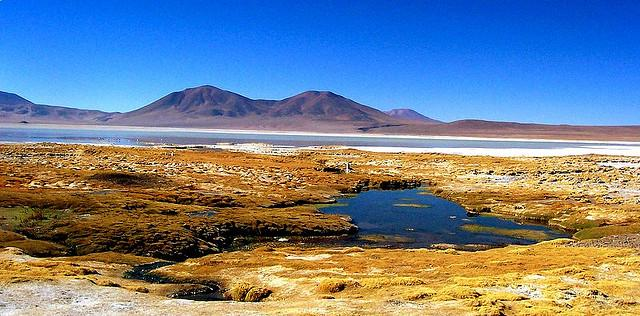
- Salar de Huasco, Salar de Huasco National Park, Chile. Wila Qullu (on the left, half visible), Waylla East and Waylla West on the border of Bolivia and Chile

Highest point
- Elevation: 4,923 m (16,152 ft)
- Coordinates: 20°22′S 68°44′W

Geography
- Location within Bolivia
- Location: Bolivia, Potosí Department; Chile, Tarapacá Region
- Parent range: Andes, Cordillera Occidental

Waylla (Aymara Stipa obtusa, a kind of feather grass, hispanicized spelling Guailla, Huailla) is a mountain in the Andes located on the border of Bolivia and Chile in the Cordillera Occidental.

It consists of two peaks, Waylla East (Guailla Oriente, Huaila Oriental, Huailla Oriental) and Waylla West (Guailla Occidente, Huailla Occidente). The distance between the peaks is about 3 km. Waylla East is about 4,923 metres (16,152 ft) high, Waylla West, south west of it, about 4,870 metres (15,978 ft) high.

The next mountain, Wila Qullu, lies north east of Waylla and it is also situated on the border of Bolivia and Chile.

Waylla lies between the Salar de Huasco in the Tarapacá Region of Chile and the Uyuni salt pan in Bolivia. On the Bolivian side it is situated in the Potosí Department, Daniel Campos Province, Llica Municipality, Canquella Canton, north west of the village Pampa Anta.

== See also ==
- Ch'alla Qullu
- Ch'api Qullu
- Waylla Q'awa
- List of mountains in the Andes
