= Waylla Q'awa =

Mountain in Bolivia

- Location within Bolivia

Highest point
- Coordinates: 20°13′05″S 68°35′46″W

Geography
- Location: Bolivia, Potosí Department; Chile
- Parent range: Andes, Cordillera Occidental

Map showing Waylla Q'awa west of the Uyuni salt flat near the border of Bolivia and Chile

Waylla Q'awa Aymara waylla Stipa obtusa, a kind of feather grass, q'awa little river, ditch, crevice, fissure, gap in the earth, "stipa brook" or "stipa ravine", also spelled Huaylla Khaua) is a mountain in the Andes of Bolivia, west of the Uyuni salt flat. It is situated in the Potosí Department, Daniel Campos Province, Llica Municipality, Canquella Canton.

== See also ==
- Ch'alla Qullu
- Waylla
- List of mountains in the Andes
