= Parrado =

Parrado is a surname. Notable people with the surname include:

- Agustín Parrado y García (1872–1946), Spanish Cardinal of the Roman Catholic
- Javier Parrado (born 1964), Bolivian classical composer
- Julio Anguita Parrado (1971–2003), Spanish war correspondent
- María Parrado (born 2001), Spanish singer
- Nando Parrado (born 1949), Uruguayan survivor of Uruguayan Air Force Flight 571
