= Adelaide Pereira da Silva =

Brazilian composer and painter (1928–2021)

- Born: July 5, 1928; São Paulo, Brazil
- Died: August 8, 2021 (aged 93) São Paulo, Brazil
- Occupations: Educator, composer, pianist, ainter
- Instrument: Piano

Adelaide Pereira da Silva (São Paulo, July 5, 1928 - São Paulo, August 8, 2021) was a Brazilian pianist, composer and painter.

== Biography ==
Adelaide Pereira da Silva was born in São Paulo. She started studying piano with her mother from an early age, and later with Nair de Souza. She became a well-accomplished pianist, when she took advanced interpretation classes with Professor Hans Bruch. According to pianist Gilberto Tinetti, she was one of Bruch's most talented students, along with Tinetti himself; Isolde Bass, Bruch's wife; Rudolf Frisch; Elisa Capocchi; Arnaldo Antunes; Maria Elisa Figueiredo; and Roberto Delollio. In her thesis, as well as in an article about Pereira da Silva's compositions, Maria Mati Sakamoto quotes Gilberto Tinetti, who referred to Prof. Pereira da Silva's "exuberant sonority" as a pianist.

Initially, Adelaide Pereira da Silva studied composition with Dinorah de Carvalho and Osvaldo Lacerda. Later, she was Camargo Guarnieri's student, and became one of the major figures of his composition school, along with famous composers such as Lacerda, Almeida Prado, Sérgio Vasconcelos Correia, Nilson Lombardi, Lina Pires de Campos and Kilza Setti. She began working as a music teacher in 1960, and was also a professor at Santa Marcelina College and Belas Artes College. She composed a number of works based on Brazilian folk themes. Her knowledge and expertise in Brazilian folk music were acquired through studies developed under Rossini Tavares de Lima's guidance.

Professor Pereira da Silva was one of the founders of the Brazilian Pro Music Society (Sociedade Pró-Música Brasileira).

== Honors and awards ==
As a composer, Adelaide Pereira da Silva was awarded many prizes, decorations, distinctions and honors:

- 1963: Composition competition by the Brazilian Folklore Association and A Gazeta magazine - first place for "três canções sobre temas do folclore brasileiro" ("three songs based on Brazilian folk themes")
- 1966: City of Santos composition contest - second place for "É tão pouco o que desejo" (based on a poem by Vicente de Carvalho).
- José Bonifácio de Andrada e Silva Medal from the Brazilian Heraldry Society
- Marechal Cândido Mariano da Silva Rondon Medal from the Brazilian Geographic Society
- Legião Joana D'Arc Medal - 150th Anniversary of Brazilian Independence
- Ana Neri Medal from the Brazilian Society for Education and Integration
- João Amos Comenius Medal from the Brazilian Literary Academy
- The Great Rondon Silver Jubileum from Marechal Cândido Rondon and its founding president Agenor Couto de Magalhães
- Euclides da Cunha Medal from the State Club
- Agenor Couto de Magalhães Spring Medal from the Brazilian Geographic Society, campaign for ecological protection
- José Vieira Couto de Magalhães Medal from the Brazilian Geographic Society
- Carlos Gomes decoration, the highest honor for Cultural Merit

== Works ==
Da Silva composed for orchestra, chamber ensemble, choir and solo instrument. Selected works include:

- 1962 Variations for piano (8 Variations)
- 1965 Suite No. 1 (Shindig, Fad, Polka, Waltz, Cateretê)
- 1965 Ponteio N. 1
- 1965 Ponteio N. 2
- 1965 Chôro N. Waltz 1
- 1965 Chôro N. Waltz 2
- 1966 Ponteio N. 3
- 1966 Ponteio N. 4
- 1966 Ponteio N. 5
- 1967 Suite N. 2 (Bent, Sieve, Chorinho, Baiao)
- 1970 Ponteio N. 6
- 1970 Ponteio N. 7
- 1970 Chôro N. Waltz 3
- 1970 Chôro N. Waltz 4
- 1970 Chôro N. Waltz 5
- 1970 Cantiga naive
- 1978 Recollection
- 1981 Echoes of Childhood
- 1993 Ponteio N. 8

== Discography ==
Da Silva's works have been recorded and issued on CD, including:

- Revelando o Brasil, Composições de Adelaide Pereira da Silva
- Teclas Brasileiras
- Brasileira: Piano Music by Brazilian Women Centaur Records
- Mulheres Compositoras França - Brasil
