= Eduardo Maldonado =

Bolivian politician (born 1968)

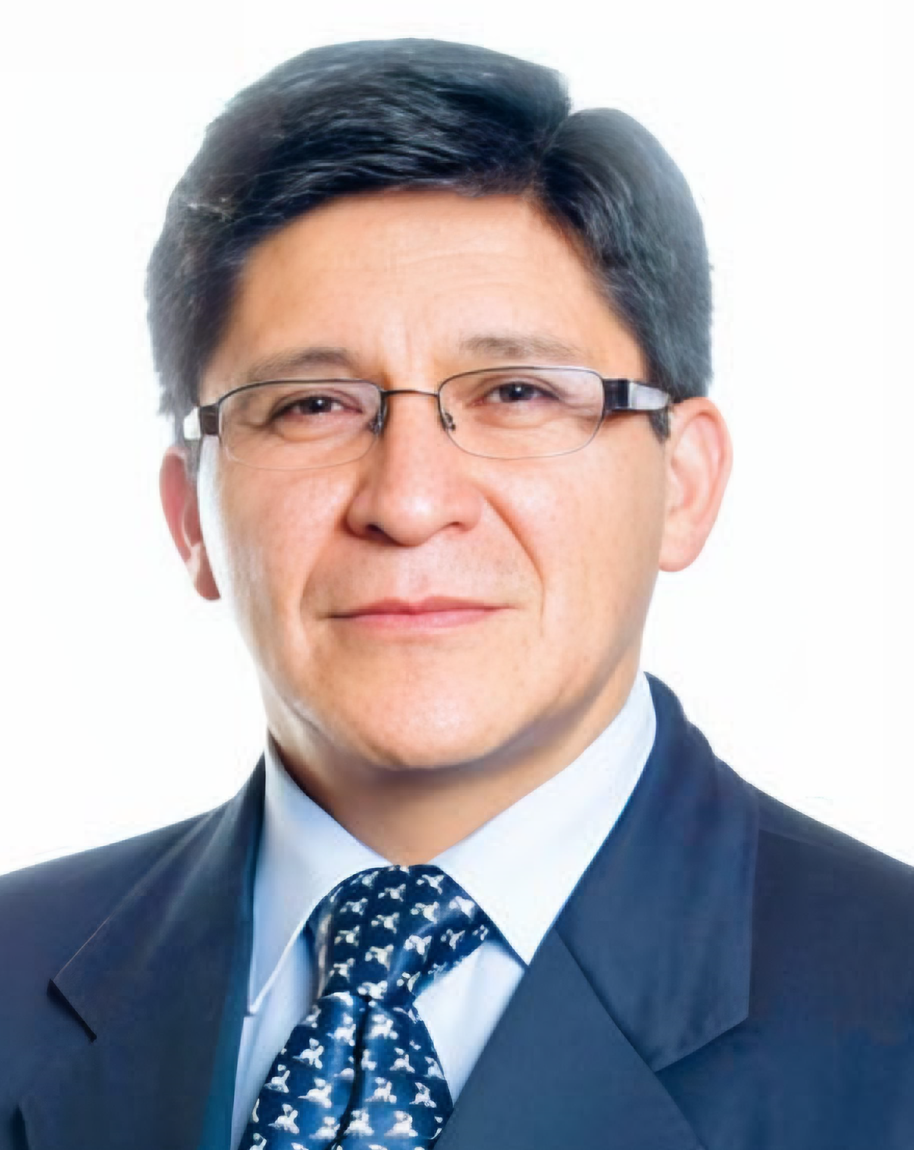
- Official portrait, 2012

Senator for Potosí
- In office 19 January 2010 – 18 January 2015
- Substitute: Ana Vilacama
- Preceded by: Antonio Peredo
- Succeeded by: René Joaquino

Personal details
- Born: Eduardo Humberto Maldonado Iporre; 16 November 1968 (age 57) Potosí, Bolivia
- Relatives: Humberto Iporre (grandfather)
- Education: Tomás Frías University
- Occupation: Economist; lawyer; politician

Eduardo Humberto Maldonado Iporre (born 16 November 1968) is a Bolivian economist, lawyer, and politician who served as senator for Potosí from 2010 to 2015. He previously served as ombudsman of Potosí from 1998 to 2009.

A graduate of Tomás Frías University, Maldonado developed his leadership skills in the student movement and aligned himself toward socialist values from a young age. He got his career start as Potosí's special representative to the Ombudsman's Office, holding the position for over a decade from the institution's inception in 1998. In 2009, he was elected to represent Potosí in the Senate on behalf of the ruling Movement for Socialism. Once in office, however, Maldonado quickly broke with his caucus over its often hierarchical leadership structure, becoming one of the first members of the 2010–2015 Legislative Assembly to defect from the ruling party.

Rather than seek reelection, Maldonado attempted to contest the Potosí mayoralty in 2015 but was barred from running due to a controversial interpretation of residency requirements by the Supreme Electoral Tribunal. The decision prompted him to sue the government before the United Nations Human Rights Committee, which in 2018 ruled that his political rights had been violated by the state. In subsequent years, Maldonado ran to return to parliament in 2019 and was again a candidate for mayor in 2021, failing to achieve either position.

== Early life and career ==
=== Early life and education ===
Eduardo Maldonado was born on 16 November 1968 in Potosí to Eduardo Maldonado Urioste, a journalist, and Lourdes Iporre Peña, a music teacher. On his mother's side, Maldonado is the grandson of Humberto Iporre Salinas, a prominent and prolific twentieth-century composer whose hymn "Potosino Soy" remains a popular fixture of the department's cultural heritage.

Maldonado completed his primary and secondary schooling in Potosí's Franciscan school, one of the city's principal academic institutions. He studied law and economics at Tomás Frías University and completed a master's degree in higher education and constitutional law. While a student, Maldonado played prominent roles in his sector's students' unions, commencing as president of his Franciscan school's student center. Maldonado later held membership in the Local University Federation while attending Tomás Frías, during which time he served as first secretary of the organization's interfaculty committee, in addition to chairing the student committees of both the law and economics tracks.

=== Ombudsman of Potosí ===
Maldonado began working at the Ombudsman's Office of Bolivia in 1998, the year it was established. Introduced as part of a package of new independent oversight bodies intended to guarantee the rule of law, the institution – headed in its early years by Ana María Romero – was tasked with protecting human and individual rights in the country. Given Potosí's status as one of the three areas most prone to human rights violations, a special branch office was established in the city, with Maldonado appointed to head it. He held the position for over a decade, supervising the regional human rights records of six presidential administrations between 1998 and 2009.

== Chamber of Senators ==
=== Election ===
In previous years, Maldonado had repeatedly rejected offers from establishment political parties to contest elective office or serve in government administration. A committed socialist since youth, he finally accepted a 2009 invitation by the ruling Movement for Socialism (MAS) to run for Senate representing Potosí. Despite their lack of party affiliation, the MAS sought in figures like Maldonado and his former superior Romero to utilize the high level of public prestige associated with the Ombudsman's Office to build bridges with the urban middle class, long weary of the Evo Morales administration.

Despite his top billing on the MAS's slate of candidates, Maldonado nonetheless actively campaigned for the position. In a region with a history of political violence, he nearly lost his life while on a campaign stop in the Tinguipaya Municipality after a mob of campesinos allegedly supportive of a rival candidate attacked his group. He ultimately recovered from the ordeal and lived to win the race, part of the MAS's blowout victory in Potosí, in which it swept nearly the entirety of the department's parliamentary delegation.

=== Tenure ===
Entering parliament, Maldonado was selected to chair the Senate's Constitution Commission, a position of particular import given the Legislative Assembly's early mission of regulating the implementation of the newly passed 2009 Constitution. For the most part, Maldonado followed the party line when it came to drafting the so-called "structural laws" necessary for this task; he oversaw the quick-fire passage of three out of five such pieces of legislation through the Senate, the penultimate step to significantly reforming the country's election commission, electoral system, and constitutional court in accordance with the new constitution.

Beyond that point, however, Maldonado's relationship with MAS leadership quickly deteriorated. In August 2010, he and other members of Potosí's parliamentary delegation began a multi-week hunger strike in protest of the government's lack of attention to regional demands. The department – long one of the poorest in Bolivia – had entered a nineteen-day strike based on eleven grievances they wished addressed, among them increased industrialization, more public works, and the final settlement of Potosí's territorial disputes with Chile and Oruro. Although the administration eventually sealed a deal to end the protests, Maldonado and other legislators' participation remained a sore point among the MAS; Morales labeled them "traitors," party leaders in parliament announced their intent to seek a recall election against them, and yet others demanded their resignations.

Maldonado's split with the MAS reached its climax in early October when – amid ongoing negotiations regarding a controversial anti-racism bill – he was booted off of the Senate's Constitution Commission. The removal of a senator mid-term from their commission assignment was unprecedented in Bolivian democratic history and came in response to Maldonado's decision to review sections of the legislation to address freedom of the press concerns presented by media outlets, bucking the orders of Morales, who had requested the law be approved without modifications. Maldonado denounced his ouster as "unfair and incorrect" and accused the ruling party of being anti-democracy and counter-revolutionary.

For the duration of his term, Maldonado remained a staunch critic of the ruling party, operating in semi-opposition without formally aligning with the Senate's conservative caucus. His was the first of many defections suffered by the MAS's parliamentary delegation between 2010 and 2015. The dissidents, which came to be collectively known as the "freethinkers," grew to include two more senators – including Maldonado's regional colleague, Carmen García – as well as multiple members of the Chamber of Deputies.

=== Commission assignments ===
- Constitution, Human Rights, Legislation, and Electoral System Commission (President: 2010)
- Planning, Economic Policy, and Finance Commission
  - Planning, Budget, Public Investment, and Comptroller's Office Committee (Secretary: 2012–2013, 2014–2015)
- Plural Economy, Production, Industry, and Industrialization Commission
  - Plural Economy, Productive Development, Public Works, and Infrastructure Committee (Secretary: 2010–2011)
- Social Policy, Education, and Health Commission
  - Housing, Employment Law, Occupational Safety, and Social Welfare Committee (Secretary: 2011–2012)
- International Policy Commission
  - Foreign and Interparliamentary Relations and International Organizations Committee (Secretary: 2013–2014)

== Later political career ==
=== 2015 Potosí mayoral campaign ===
Given his split with the MAS, Maldonado was not nominated for reelection in 2014 and forwent seeking a second term as part of a different front. Instead, he set his sights on local politics, looking to contest the Potosí mayoralty in the 2015 subnationals. Starting in October 2014, he formally began the process of collecting the necessary signatures to acquire ballot access for his new party, Popular Power. After accomplishing this, he initiated his campaign, running on a platform of apoliticism and opposition to the "corporatization of politics" by the ruling party.

Despite an early entry into the race, Maldonado's campaign was quickly cut short. In January 2015, the Supreme Electoral Tribunal disqualified his candidacy on the grounds that he failed to meet the necessary residency requirements to run. The decision responded to a controversial ruling issued the previous year, which barred nearly all outgoing parliamentarians from running for local office under the argument that their primary residences had been the seat of government in La Paz and not their respective regions. Above all, the ruling affected the political futures of former MAS legislators that had broken with the party, all of whom appealed the court's decision to no avail.

In the months following his disqualification, Maldonado denounced his ordeal as politically motivated, accusing the MAS of "dictating the unethical actions of the ... Supreme Electoral Tribunal." Having exhausted all national legal channels to have his candidacy restored, Maldonado took his complaint to the Inter-American Commission on Human Rights and the United Nations Human Rights Committee alleging a violation of his political rights. Both bodies agreed to hear the case in 2015, with the latter ruling in 2018 that the Bolivian government had indeed violated Maldonado's rights, for which the state was asked to pay him adequate restitution. Maldonado celebrated the ruling as a "moral victory against the abuse and discretion of those who circumstantially exercise power."

=== 2019 general election ===
In the ensuing years, Maldonado refocused his attention on personal projects, such as efforts to convert portions of his family's estate into a museum dedicated to Humberto Iporre, which opened in late 2015. At the same time, he remained active in political spaces. Having previously criticized the MAS for its "ideological turn" away from indigenous rights and in favor of extractive industries, Maldonado founded his own group, the Movement for Indigenous, Democratic, and Environmental Values (VIDA), which counted the presence of other left-wing intellectuals, such as César Escobar – son of the deceased mining unionist Filemón Escobar, himself a MAS supporter-turned-critic.

For the 2019 elections, Maldonado and Escobar signed an alliance with Civic Community (CC) to support the presidential aspirations of Carlos Mesa. As part of the pact, Maldonado sought to return to the Legislative Assembly, this time contesting a seat in the Chamber of Deputies. He won the race, owing to a significant drop in regional electoral support for the MAS that cycle, which prevented it from entirely sweeping Potosí's parliamentary delegation as it had done in previous elections. Despite the victory, subsequent allegations of electoral fraud caused the results to be annulled, preventing Maldonado from assuming his seat. When the elections were rerun in 2020, he was no longer included on CC's slate of candidates.

=== 2021 Potosí mayoral campaign ===
Six years on from his 2015 disqualification, Maldonado sought again to compete for the Potosí mayoralty. Distanced from CC, he registered his candidacy with the Third System Movement (MTS), led by La Paz Governor Félix Patzi, himself a MAS dissident. Although the MTS's electoral presence was practically non-existent outside its native La Paz, the party nonetheless saw significant successes in 2021 by aligning itself with individually popular local candidates, often former or even current-until-then MAS partisans that had first been denied that party's nomination. This strategy, however, largely relied on the personal popularity of those running, and in a crowded field of candidates – including longtime former mayor René Joaquino and civic leader Jhonny Llally – Maldonado failed to stand out, finishing in a distant fifth place.

== Electoral history ==
Electoral history of Eduardo Maldonado
Year	Office	Party	Alliance	Votes			Result	Ref.
Year	Office	Party	Alliance	Total	%	P.	Result	Ref.
2009	Senator	Independent	Movement for Socialism	243,855	78.32%	1st	Won	(Note: Presented on an electoral list. The data shown represents the share of the vote the entire party/alliance received in that constituency.)
2015	Mayor	Popular Power		Disqualified			Lost	
2019	Deputy	VIDA Movement	Civic Community	119,697	32.84%	2nd	Annulled	
2021	Mayor	VIDA Movement	Third System Movement	4,670	4.09%	5th	Lost	
Source: Plurinational Electoral Organ | Electoral Atlas

Government offices
Office established	Ombudsman of Potosí; 1998–2009	Succeeded by René Arroyo
Senate of Bolivia
Preceded by Antonio Peredo	Senator for Potosí; 2010–2015; Served alongside: Carmen García; Efraín Condori, Clementina Garnica	Succeeded by René Joaquino
