= Tomás Frías (disambiguation) =

Tomás Frías (1804–1884) was twice president of Bolivia.

Tomás Frías may also refer to:

- Tomás Frías Province, in Bolivia
- Tomás Frías Autonomous University, a Bolivian university
