= Modesta Sanginés Uriarte =

Bolivian composer (1832–1887)

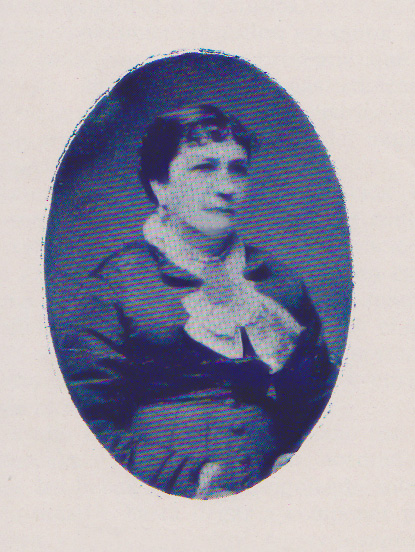
- Born: Modesta Cesárea Sanginés Uriarte; 26 February 1832; La Paz, Bolivia
- Died: 5 February 1887 (aged 54); Paris, France
- Other names: Modesta Sanginés, Modesta C. Sanginés U.
- Occupations: composer, journalist, philanthropist
- Years active: 1848–1887

Modesta Sanginés Uriarte (26 February 1832 – 5 February 1887) was one of the principal composers in 19th century Bolivia. Writing over fifty compositions, her works were published in 2015. In addition to composing, Sanginés worked as a journalist writing articles to benefit women and published legends of her native country. Her philanthropic works provided social services for the elderly, orphans and poor, building a hospital wing to care for those who were unable to provide for themselves. She also used her musical talents to raise funds to assist the wounded and prisoners of war during the war between Bolivia, Chile and Peru over control of the Pacific coast of South America.

== Early life ==
Modesta Cesárea Sanginés Uriarte was born on 26 February 1832 in La Paz, Bolivia to Manuela Uriarte Sagárnaga and Indalecio Sanginés y Calderón. Though customs of the time restricted education to men, Sanginés' parents enrolled her in a school which had recently been created by Dámasa Cabezón, a Chilean educator. Cabezón had founded a school for women, which was successful in Chile, and at the invitation of the government of Bolivia was asked to found a school in La Paz in 1845, which operated for three years. Sanginés entered the school and studied French and Italian languages, the arts and music. She was particularly talented on the piano and often gave recitals in tandem with Adolfo Ballivián, who would later become president of Bolivia. Sanginés chose not to marry, though she had suitors, preferring to keep her freedom. When her parents died, she maintained her own home, rather than moving in with her brother, as was customary.

== Career ==
Known as a talented vocalist, as well as a pianist, Sanginés and Bernandino Sagárnaga founded the Philharmonic Society of La Paz in 1863. Sanginés began to compose music and though trained with a familiarity of Beethoven, Bellini, Liszt, Mozart, and Strauss, among others, her music tended to reflect patriotic and religious themes. Her sentimental waltz, Sueños de color de rosa (Rose-colored dreams) was typical of her tender and nostalgic style. Though most of her works remained unpublished, she wrote over 50 compositions and published two volumes of works in Paris. Among her works, she wrote the collection El Alto de la Alianza (The Height of the Alliance), and songs Arroyuelo (Rivulet), Cantos a la Virgen (Songs to the Virgin), La brisa del Uchamachi (The Breeze of the Uchamachi), Pensamiento (Thought), Plegaria a Jusús Crucificado (Prayer to the Crucified Jesus), Recuerdo de los Andes (Memories of the Andes), Villancicos (Christmas Carols), Zapateo Indio (Zapateo Indian), and compositions to commemorate Rigoberto Torrico, Juan Ondarza and her brother Bernardino Sanjinées Uriarte, as well as Variaciones sobre el tema del Himno Nacional (Variations over the theme of the National Anthem).

In addition to her musical compositions, from a young age, Sanginés wrote literary compositions, translated works of other authors, and gave language lessons. She published contributions in the newspaper El Jardincito de Maria (Mary's Little Garden) writing useful tips for women and their domestic work. She became editor of the paper publishing 267 issues, though the newspaper later changed its name to Semanario Católico in 1878. In a similar genre, she published the book Trabajos de aguja – nociones de economía doméstica – sencillas preparaciones para alimentos (Needlework – home economic notions – simple food preparations, 1874). Other works included Leyenda "El Desertor" (The legend of the Deserter) which was published in a national anthology, Las dos Claras (The Two Claras) and El Hijo del Cóndor (Son of the Condor). She also wrote a poetic elegy to her mother, which reflected the romantic sentiment of her loss.

As a benefactor, Sanginés had a special affinity to care for the poor and sick. She financed and had built, a section of the Hospital Loaiza to provide care for the destitute, the elderly, orphans and women. A member of the Sociedad de Beneficencia (Society of Charity), she worked on many social welfare projects, including feeding those who were without food during the famine of 1878. During the War of the Pacific, Sanginés organized efforts to care for the wounded and prisoners of war. Hosting musical salons and concerts in her home, she raised funds for the war effort. When the war ended, wishing to travel and improve both her education and her health, Sanginés went to Europe. In her will, she left bequests to many of her woman employees, family, friends, specifically noting that the funds were to give the women their own source of earnings for necessities and education, free of male intervention.

== Death and legacy ==
Sanginés died on 5 February 1887 in Paris. Bolivia's plenipotentiary minister in France, Aniceto Arce (who would later become Bolivian president) and the Bolivian diaspora living in Paris, paid homage to her, before her remains were returned to her homeland to be interred in the family mausoleum in the General Cemetery of La Paz. She is considered as one of the principal composers of her era in Bolivia. In 2011, the Bolivian historian Patricia Montaño, a relative of Sanginés, had inherited Sanginés' papers and offered them for sale to the Center for Documentation in Latin American Literature and Arts (Spanish: Centro de Documentación en Artes y Literaturas Latinoamericanas (Cedoal)) to allow for their preservation. Upon authentication, by Javier Parrado, the manuscripts were acquired. A research team from Cedoal transcribed the documents and recovered unpublished scores and performance chronicles from notebooks written by Sanjinés, as well as a book and other scores which had been published in Paris in 1858 and 1881. The newly discovered works were published in a book, Modesta C. Sanjinés Uriarte: Música Boliviana en Partitura (Modesta C. Sanjinés Uriarte: Bolivian Sheet Music) by the Simón I. Patiño Foundation in 2015.
