= Mariana Alandia =

Bolivian classical pianist

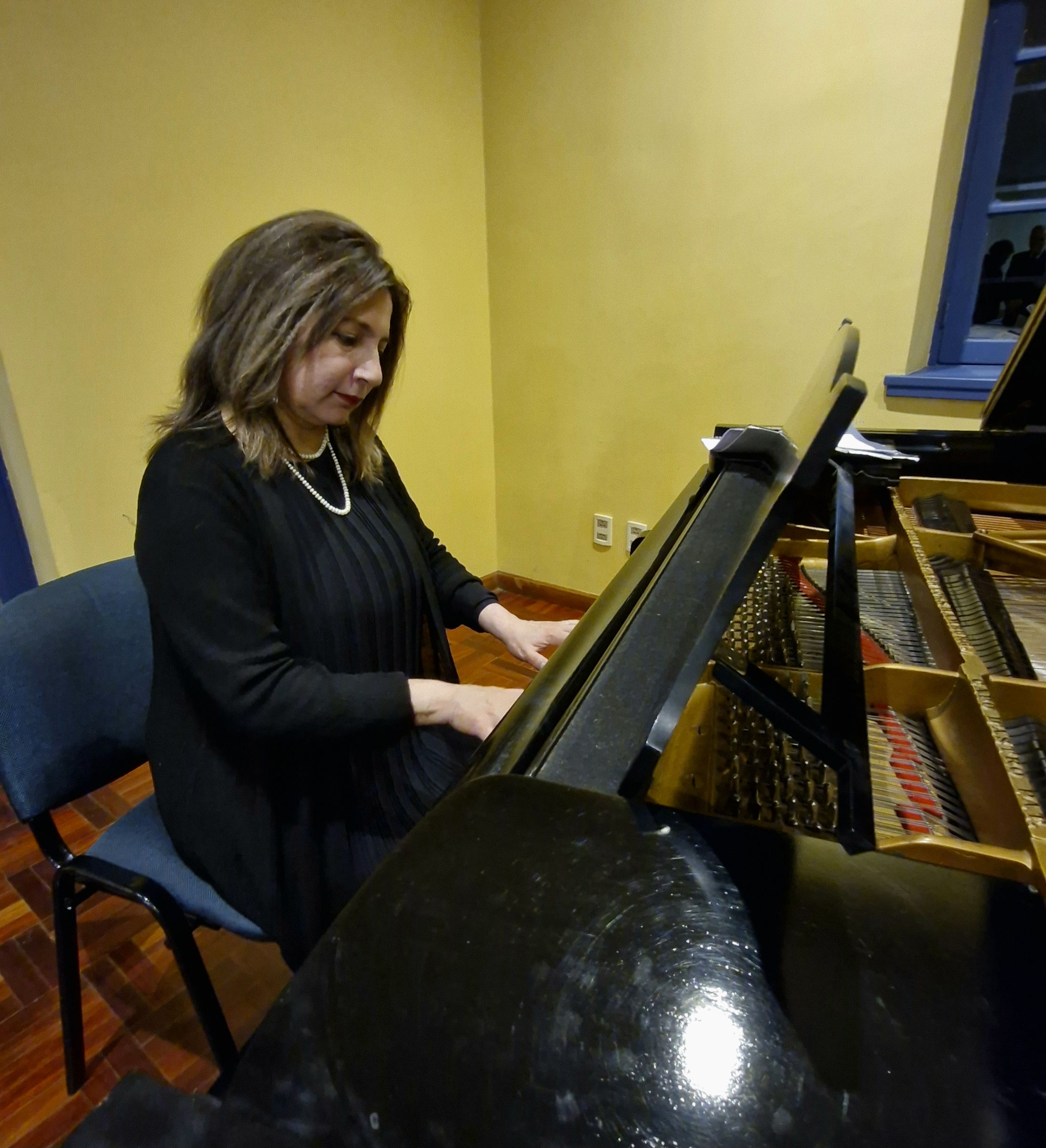

Mariana Alandia Navajas (Tarija) is a Bolivian classical pianist who interpreted most of the 20th century Bolivian classical composers.

== Biography ==
Mariana Navajas Alandia began her piano studies with the teachers Mario Estensoro and Sarah Ismael. Further studies with Miguel Angel Quesada in Costa Rica, and later chamber music with Ramiro Soriano Arce at the National Conservatory of Music in La Paz, Bolivia, where she completed a piano degree. Corsi di perfezionamento musicale at the Academy G. Curci with Hector Pell (Rome) and Academia Chigiana, (Siena). Concerts in Bolivia, Italy, Austria and Peru. Her interpretations of the Bolivian composers are based on researches into Bolivian music history.

== Texts ==
- Piano music of Eduardo Caba, Humberto Viscarra Monje, Marvin Sandi, Alberto Villapando, and Florencio Pozadas:

Alandia, Mariana y Parrado, Javier. 2003 „A la vera del Piano“: T'inzakos, Revista Boliviana de Ciencias Sociales cuatrimestral del Programa de Investigación Estratégica en Bolivia (PIEB). Número 14 Juni 2003

- No Hay caminos, hay que caminar... (about the interpretation and repertoire selection). Website: Germinaciones.

== Recordings ==
- Recording at the premiere of the recently found manuscript of Eduardo Caba's Aire Indio # 7 at the Espacio Simón I. Patiño auditorium (La Paz, 2009).
- Internet audio streaming: Rádio USP FM 93,7 MHz Brazil: Music of the Bolivian composer Gastón Arce.
- 1997 Cassette: Orquesta Experimental de Instrumentos. Conductor: Nativos Cergio Prudencio.
- 1989 Cassette: Música de misiones jesuíticas, Cerruti y Zipoli mit Coral Nova (órgano). Proaudio.
- 1994 CD Sayariy soundtrack (Umbrales von Cergio Prudencio). Proton.
- 2001 CD Música Boliviana del Siglo XX. Gastón Arce y Alberto Villalpando Villalpando. Estudios Cantvs.

== Selection of concerts ==
Bolivia:

- La Paz. September 2009. Premiere of 3 new Aires Indios of Eduardo Caba
- La Paz. May.2009. Beethoven 1. Klavierkonzert. Bolivian National Symphonic Orcuestra. Dirigent: Willy Pozadas
- La Paz. Proyecto Germinaciones 2008
- Cochabamba 2008
- Santa Cruz

Italy: Progetto Musica 2002, Nuove Forme Sonore, Mariana Alandia Navajas, pianoforte:

- Florencio Pozadas: Senza titolo
- Eduardo Caba: Aire Indios
- Javier Parrado: Mòvil
  dorate mele del sole
- Jorge Ibáñez: Contemplazioni 1° 2°, 9°, 5° y 8°
- Cergio Prudencio: Ambiti
