= Thuwa =

Mountain in Bolivia

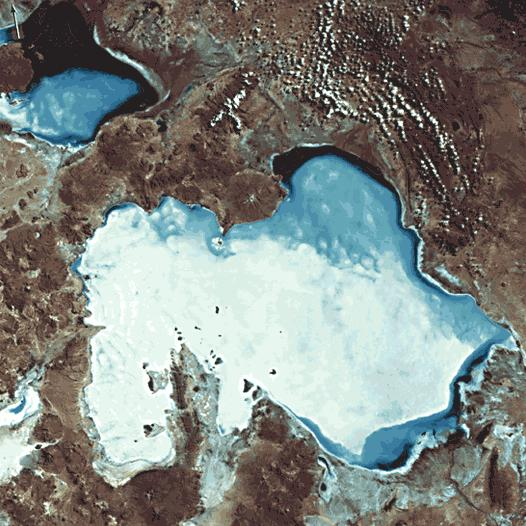
- Satellite image of the Uyuni salt flat (center) and Thuwa (lower left)

Highest point
- Elevation: 5,063 m (16,611 ft)
- Coordinates: 20°28′15″S 68°24′08″W

Geography
- Location within Bolivia
- Location: Bolivia, Potosí Department
- Parent range: Andes

Thuwa (Aymara for spit out, belch out, also spelled Togua, Towa) is a 5,063-metre-high (16,611 ft) mountain in the Bolivian Andes. It is located in the Potosí Department, Daniel Campos Province, Llica Municipality. Thuwa lies between the Uyuni salt flat in the east and the Napa or Thuwa salt flat (Salar de Togua) in the west. The highest neighboring mountains are Jaruma in the north and Mancha in the east. The smaller mountain at the north-western slope of Thuwa is named Wiraqucha Qullu (Huirajocha Kkollu). The plain west of the mountain is named Thuwa Pampa (Towa Pampa, Pampa de Togua).
