= Ch'api Qullu =

Mountain in Bolivia

- Location within Bolivia

Highest point
- Elevation: 3,917 m (12,851 ft)
- Prominence: 350 m (1,150 ft)
- Coordinates: 20°06′S 68°14′W

Geography
- Location: Bolivia, Potosí Department, Daniel Campos Province, Llica Municipality
- Parent range: Andes, Cordillera Occidental

Ch'api Qullu (Aymara ch'api thorn, qullu mountain,"thorn mountain", hispanicized spelling Chapi Kkollu) is a mountain in the Bolivian Cordillera Occidental situated on the western shore of the Uyuni salt pan. It is approximately 3,917 m high reaching a prominence of about 350 m. The mountain is located near the village of Canquella in the Potosí Department, Daniel Campos Province, Llica Municipality.

== See also ==
- Ch'alla Qullu
- Wila Qullu
- List of mountains in the Andes
