= Jaruma =

Mountain in Bolivia

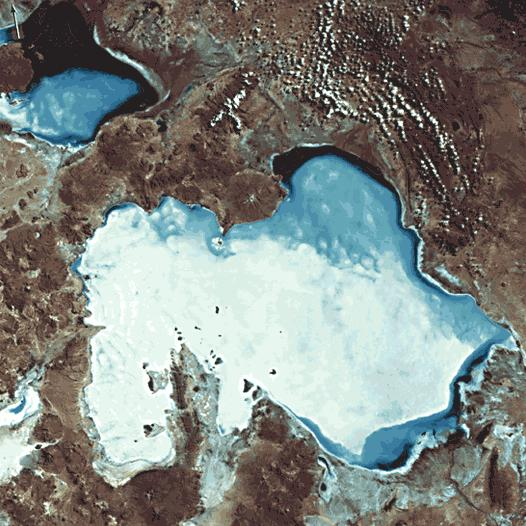
- Satellite image of the Uyuni salt flat (center) and Jaruma (lower left)

Highest point
- Elevation: 4,863 m (15,955 ft)
- Coordinates: 20°23′51″S 68°23′47″W

Geography
- Location within Bolivia
- Location: Bolivia, Potosí Department
- Parent range: Andes

Jaruma (Aymara jaru bitter, uma water, "bitter water") is a 4,863-metre-high (15,955 ft) mountain in the Bolivian Andes. It is located in the Potosí Department, Daniel Campos Province, Llica Municipality. Jaruma lies between the Uyuni salt flat in the east and the Napa salt flat in the west. The highest neighboring mountains are Mancha in the south-east and Thuwa in the south. The smaller mountain at the south-western slope of Jaruma is named Wiraqucha Qullu (Huirajocha Kkollu).
