= Iruputuncu (Tarapacá-Daniel Campos) =

Mountain in Bolivia

- Location within Bolivia

Highest point
- Elevation: 4,200 m (13,800 ft)
- Coordinates: 19°53′18″S 68°32′30″W

Geography
- Location: Bolivia, Potosí Department, Daniel Campos Province; Chile, Tarapacá Region
- Parent range: Andes, Cordillera Occidental

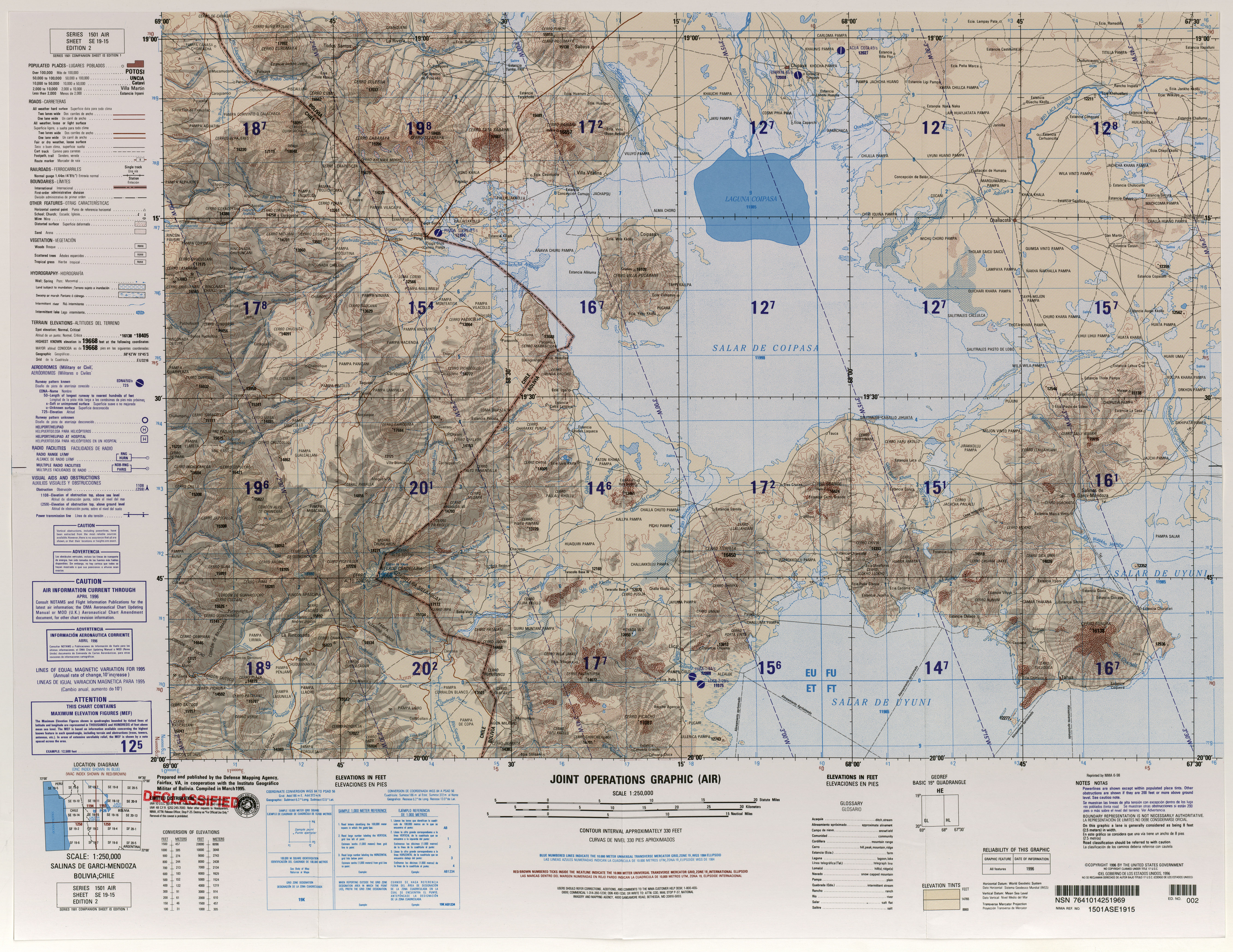
Map showing Iru Phutunqu on the border of Bolivia and Chile, south of the Umani

Iruputuncu (possibly from Aymara iru spiny Peruvian feather grass, phutunqu a small vessel or a hole, pit, crater) is a mountain in the Andes in the Cordillera Occidental on the border of Bolivia and Chile. The Chilean side is in the Tarapacá Region, and the Bolivian side is in the Potosí Department, Daniel Campos Province, Llica Municipality. Iruputuncu is southeast of Mount Candelaria, west of the Salar de Uyuni salt flat and south of the Umani. It is about 4,200 m (13,780 ft) high.
