= Mancha (Bolivia) =

Mountain in Bolivia

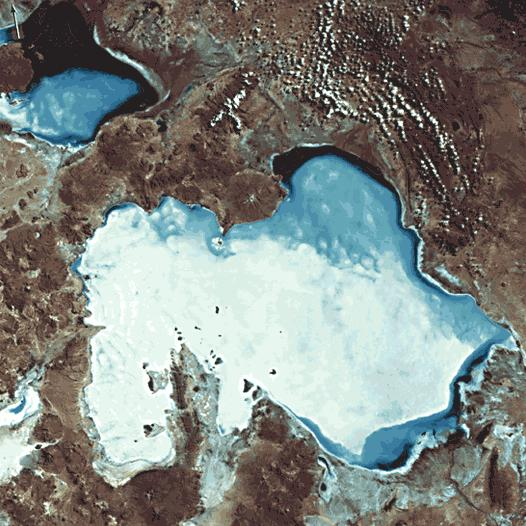
- Satellite image of the Uyuni salt flat (center) and Mancha (lower left)

Highest point
- Elevation: 5,024 m (16,483 ft)
- Coordinates: 20°27′36″S 68°19′00″W

Geography
- Location within Bolivia
- Location: Bolivia, Potosí Department
- Parent range: Andes

Mancha (Quechua for fear) is a 5,024-metre-high (16,483 ft) mountain in the Bolivian Andes. It is located in the Potosí Department, Daniel Campos Province, Llica Municipality. Mancha lies between the Uyuni salt flat in the east and the Napa salt flat in the west. The highest neighboring mountains are Thuwa in the west and Jaruma in the north-west.
