= Law Against Racism =

Statute by Bolivian legislative assembly

The Law Against Racism and All Forms of Discrimination (Spanish: Ley 045 Contra el Racismo y Toda Forma de Discriminación; often called the Law Against Racism) is a statute passed by the Plurinational Legislative Assembly of Bolivia as Law 045 and promulgated by President Evo Morales into law as Law 737/2010 on 8 October 2010. The law prohibits discrimination and discriminatory aggression by public and private institutions and individuals, creates a governmental Committee Against Racism and All Forms of Discrimination, and bars the dissemination of racist and discriminatory ideas through the mass media. The provisions of the law applying to the media caused extensive controversy and were opposed by mainstream publications and media worker associations.

== Legislative process ==
The first draft of the law was proposed by the Human Rights Committee of the Bolivian Chamber of Deputies on 24 May 2010, the anniversary of an incident of racist violence in Sucre in 2008.

Following approval by the Chamber of Deputies, the Senate took up consideration of the Law in October. The law was considered first by the Constitution Committee, whose chair, Senator Eduardo Maldonado (MAS-IPSP, Potosí) declared he was open to revisions in the law. On 4 October, a plenary session of the Senate replaced Maldonado with Eugenio Rojas (MAS-IPSP) as chair of the committee, assuring no changes would be made in committee. The law, unchanged from the version approved by the Deputies, was considered in plenary from 16:45 on 7 October to 05:15 on 8 October. The session was tumultuous and included frequent interruptions by opponents of the bill. Opposition lawmakers unsuccessfully proposed a revocation referendum on Articles 16 and 23. The bill was passed by the Senate by a greater than two-thirds majority.

President Evo Morales promulgated the measure into law on 8 October 2010.

== Prohibitions ==
=== Service and public accommodations ===
Article 13 penalizes the following acts by public servants:

- Racist or discriminatory verbal aggression
- Denial of service for racist or discriminatory reasons
- Physical, psychological or sexual maltreatment for racist or discriminatory reasons

The internal regulations of public agencies must prohibit such acts, accept complaints about them, and must turn over criminally culpable employees for prosecution.

Article 14 penalizes the following acts in private institutions:

- Racist or discriminatory verbal aggression
- Denial of service for racist or discriminatory reasons
- Physical, psychological or sexual maltreatment for racist or discriminatory reasons, when these are not criminal
- Denigrating actions

Private institutions must revise their internal regulations so that any of these acts by employees are considered internal faults, must share denunciations made against their employees with the Committee against Racism, and must inform prosecutors of criminal acts.

Article 15 prohibits discrimination in the right to enter establishments serving the public, including the hanging of signs advertising such discrimination. Municipalities have the responsibility to enforce this norm by three days of closure at the first offense, thirty days on the second, and definitive closure on the third.

=== Criminal acts ===
Article 21 of the law makes racist or discriminatory motives an aggravating factor for all crimes, many subject to a one-third increase in minimum sentence and one-half increase in maximum sentence, not exceeding the overall maximum set by the Bolivian constitution.

Articles 22 and 23 create a series of "crimes against human dignity," as Chapter V of Title VIII of the Bolivian Penal Code. These are:

- The crime of Racism: "to arbitrary and illegally restrict, annul, devalue or impede the exercise of individual or collective rights on the basis of race, national or ethic origin, color, ancestry, membership in a nation, indigenous originary campesino people, or the Afro-Bolivian people, or the use of the clothing or language of such people," punishable by three to seven years of deprivation of liberty. The crime is aggravated if committed by a public servant or a private individual providing public service, or committed with violence.
- The crime of Discrimination: "to arbitrary and illegally obstruct, restrict, devalue, impede, or annul the exercise of individual or collective rights on the basis of sex, age, gender, sexual orientation, gender identity, cultural identity, family background, nationality, citizenship, language, religious creed, ideology, political or philosophical opinion, civil status, economic or social condition, illness, type of occupation, grade of instruction, physical, intellectual or sensory handicap or alternate capacity, pregnancy, regional origin, physical appearance, or clothing," punishable by one to five years of deprivation of liberty. The crime is aggravated if committed by a public servant or a private individual providing public service, or committed with violence.
- The crime of Diffusion and incitement to racism and discrimination: "to disseminate through any media ideas based on racial superiority or hate, or than promote and/or justify racism or discrimination" for the motives described above; and "to incite violence against or persecution of people or groups of people on the basis of racist or discriminatory motives," punishable by one to five years of deprivation of liberty. The crime is aggravated if committed by a public servant or a public authority. Media workers and media owners do not benefit from immunity or fuero.
- Banning Racist or discriminatory organizations and associations: Membership in organizations or associations that "promote and/or justify racism or discrimination" as defined above, or "incite to hatred of, violence against, and persecution of persons or groups of persons on the basis of racist or discriminatory motives" is criminalized, punishable by one to four years of deprivation of liberty. The crime is aggravated if committed by a public servant or a public authority.
- The crime of Racist or discriminatory verbal aggression: "the realization of insults or other verbal aggression for racist or discriminatory motives," punishable by 40 days to 18 months of community service work and a fine of forty to 150 days' wages. The crime is aggravated if committed in print, manuscript or media. If an accused person who retracts the aggression at or before the time of indictment, the criminal process is extinguished; however, only one retraction may be considered. Retractions must be issued by the same medium and with the same reach as the original aggression, with the responsible party assuming the costs involved.

Article 24 also considers a variety of instances of discriminatory actions which may be considered through private, civil actions between the parties involved.

== Controversy with Bolivian media ==
The law's Article 16, concerning the mass media, and part of Article 23, which states that no one is exempt from the law, were sharply opposed by Bolivian and some international media associations.

Article 16. (Mass Media). A medium which authorizes and publishes racist and discriminatory ideas will be subject to economic sanctions and to suspension of its license to function, subject to regulation.

Article 23 (Adding to the penal code) […] Article 281 fourth sub-part (Diffusion and Incitement to Racism or Discrimination). […] II. When the act is committed by a worker in the media, or the proprietor of one, he or she will not be able to allege immunity or fuero of any kind.

According to La Razón, the final version of the law softens penalties for broadcasting racist ideas and requires media outlets to allocate spaces or scheduling time to anti-racism educational content.
