= Florencio Pozadas =

Florencio Ruck Pozadas Cordero (1939-1968) was a percussionist and composer pioneer of the electroacoustic music, and post serial composition techniques in Bolivia.

== Biography ==
Pozadas was born in Potosí, Bolivia. He was a violin student at the Academia de Bellas Artes in the Tomás Frías Autonomous University of Potosi, and studies in Buenos Aires at the Conservatorio Municipal Manuel de Falla. Later he studied composition under Gerardo Gandini and won a Scholarship from 1967 to 1968 for postgraduate studies at the CLAEM (Centro Latinoamericano de Altos Estudios Musicales del Instituto Torcuato Di Tella) with Luigi Nono, Cristobal Halfter, Vladimir Ussachevsky, and Roman Haubenstock-Ramati. He was member of the percussion ensemble Ritmus conducted by Antonio Yepes and The National Philharmonic Orchestra of Buenos Aires. His work for choir Tres coros bolivianos won in 1965 the first prize of the contest Luzmila Patiño in Cochabamba, Bolivia. Died in a traffic accident in 1968 near Buenos Aires.

== Recording ==
- Pozadas as percussionist

== Principal works ==
- Pieces for piano. Premiere: Gerardo Gandini. Recent interpretations: Mariana Alandia in Bolivia , in Italy
- Dos Canciones for tenor and orchestra. Text: Giuseppe Ungaretti
- Quinsa Arawis for soprano di coloratura and ensemble. Premiere: Solistas de Música Contemporanea de Buenos Aires, Armando Krieger (cond.), Marta Carrizo (sopran)
- CM 1 for tape and percussion
