= Piqa =

Mountain in Bolivia

- Location within Bolivia

Highest point
- Elevation: 5,038 m (16,529 ft)
- Coordinates: 20°05′S 68°46′W

Geography
- Location: Bolivia, Potosí Department, Chile, Tarapacá Region
- Parent range: Andes

Piqa (Aymara for a mass of maize prepared to make chicha, Hispanicized spelling Piga) is a mountain in the Andes on the border of Bolivia and Chile, west of the Salar de Uyuni. It has a height of 5,038 metres (16,529 ft).

On the Bolivian side Piqa lies in the Potosí Department, Daniel Campos Province, Llica Municipality, Canquella Canton, and on the Chilean side it belongs to the Tarapacá Region. One of the nearest mountains is Ch'alla Qullu north-east of it.

== See also ==
- List of mountains in the Andes
