= Dámasa Cabezón =

Argentine-Chilean women's education pioneer

- Born: 1792; Salta, Viceroyalty of the Río de la Plata
- Died: 17 March 1861 (aged 68–69); Valparaíso, Chile
- Occupation: Teacher
- Known for: Establishment of women's education institutes
- Father: José León Cabezón

Dámasa Cabezón (1792 – 17 March 1861) was an Argentine-Chilean educator and women's education pioneer in 19th-century South America. A daughter of the Spanish educator José León Cabezón, she founded educational institutes for girls in Santiago de Chile (1838) and La Paz, Bolivia (1845). She has been credited with establishing the first generation of secular schools for girls in Chile.

== Early life ==
Dámasa Cabezón was the daughter of the Spanish educator José León Cabezón and his wife María Martínez Outes. Her father had emigrated from Spain to Salta in the Viceroyalty of the Río de la Plata where he founded a school for the children of the colonial upper-class. In 1828, she accompanied her father to Santiago de Chile and began teaching Latin at a similar school he had founded in the city.

== Career ==
In 1832, together with her sister Manuela, Cabezón established a school for girls in Santiago, which she directed until 1845. In that year, she relocated to La Paz, Bolivia, where she was hired by the government of José Ballivián to establish an educational institute for women along the lines of her foundation in Chile. This institute educated, among others, the Bolivian composer Modesta Sanginés Uriarte. Having returned from Bolivia in 1848, she directed a school in La Serena for most of the 1850s before retiring to Valparaíso, where she died in March 1861. The historian Joyce Contreras Villalobos wrote that Cabezón's were the first attempts at establishing secular institutes for women's education in Chile.

== Bibliography ==
- Contreras Villalobos, Joyce (2017). "Las transformaciones del campo cultural a mediados del siglo XIX y el surgimiento de una escritora moderna: Rosario Orrego de Uribe" (PDF). In Contreras Villalobos, Joyce; Ulloa Inostroza, Carla; Landeros Tiznado, Damaris (eds.). Escritoras chilenas del siglo XIX (in Spanish). Santiago de Chile. pp. 68–105.
- Ramos, Juan Pedro (1910). Historia de la instrucción primaria en la República Argentina 1810–1910 (in Spanish). Vol. 1. Buenos Aires.
- de la Taille, Alexandrina (2011). "Tras las huellas de la educación católica femenina en el siglo XIX. Mujeres y cultura". In Stuven, Anna María; Fermandois, Joaquín (eds.). Historia de las mujeres en Chile: Tomo I (in Spanish). Vol. 1 (Spanish ed.). Santiago de Chile. ISBN 9789563476910.
- Urquidi, José Marcedonio (1919). Bolivianas ilustres (in Spanish). La Paz.
