= Beatriz Balzi =

Argentinian pianist (1936–2001)

Beatriz Balzi (Buenos Aires 1936–2001) was a renowned Argentine pianist, professor and musicologist specialized in contemporary Latin-American music.

== Academic background ==
Beatriz Balzi studied in the National Conservatory of Music and Scenic Arts Carlos López Buchardo, in Buenos Aires, Argentina, graduating in piano and Music Culture. She studied piano with Vicente Scaramuzza (also professor of Martha Argerich and Daniel Barenboim), musical composition with Alberto Ginastera and counterpoint with Pedro Sáenz. She completed her piano studies in Brazil under José Kliass and studied composition with Camargo Guarnieri.

== Work as a performer ==
Balzi emigrated along with her family to Brazil in 1960, and became a Brazilian citizen in 1982. She performed regularly in musical centers of Europe, the United States, and Latin America, and she recorded numerous works of Latin-American composers for radio and television stations in Buenos Aires, Madrid, Barcelona, Paris, Amsterdam, Cologne, and Boston.

== Work as professor ==
From 1970 to 1976, Beatriz Balzi collaborated as a professor and performer with the Piracicaba School of Music, interpreting several concerts for piano and orchestra under the conduction of composer Ernst Mahle. In 1976, she was invited by Anna Estela Schic and Michel Philippot to become a member of the music faculty Julio Mesquita Filho at the Paulista University (UNESP), where she gave piano courses that focused mainly on contemporary music. At that time, Balzi decided to follow a performer and professoral career and abandoned musical composition studies.

In 1974, Beatriz Balzi took part in lectures about Latin-American contemporary music and became a founding member of the São Paulo New Music Nucleus (Núcleo Música Nova). She conducted courses on interpretation of contemporary music in several festivals and universities, and was invited to numerous meetings, forums, congresses and festivals of contemporary music in Latin-America. She was also invited by the Music Academy of São Paulo to fill the Luigi Chafarelli Chair.

== Work as musicologist ==
According to Eliana Monteiro Da Silva: “The urgence of being useful directed the professional and personal life of Beatriz Balzi; and that posture conducted her to research and study a repertoire that was emerging in the second half of the 20th Century - with its characteristic unconventional notation and experimental performing techniques - at a time when quite a few performers were willing to do it. Thus, perceiving her knowledge and interest in this subject, many composers began to send her their pieces to have them divulged.”

Beatriz Balzi dedicated considerable time and effort to research and study the contemporary Latin-American piano repertory, looking for the most relevant and representative pieces. Balzi took advantage of her contacts at festivals and academic forums to collect a considerable number of works from Latin-American contemporary composers; and with the purpose of sharing that valuable material; she planned the production of a comprehensive sonic archive.

That was the origin of her Opus Magnum, a collection of recordings titled Compositores Latino-Americanos; intended to contain at least one piece of each Latin-American country. She was able to record works from thirteen countries in five CDs that included seven sections, before she fell unexpectedly ill and died while she was recording the eighth section.

For those interested in getting acquainted with the Latin-American classical piano repertoire from the 20th century, this collection contains pieces that are representative of the most varied styles, techniques and genres.

A list of composers includes the following:

Compositores Latinoamericanos, Beatriz Balzi, piano.

Vol. 1-3 (a two-CD set):

- Manuel Ponce (Mexico)
- Juan Bautista Plaza (Venezuela)
- Eduardo Fabini (Uruguay)
- Ernesto Lecuona(Cuba)
- Alberto Ginastera (Argentina)
- Sérgio Vasconcellos Corrêa (Brazil)
- Mario Lavista (Mexico)
- Guillermo Uribe Holguín (Colombia)
- Eduardo Caba (Bolivia)
- Carlos Sánchez Málaga (Peru)
- Gilberto Mendes (Brazil)
- Coriún Aharonián (Uruguay)
- Manuel Enríquez (Mexico)
- Luis Mucillo (Argentina)

Vol. 4-5:

- Carlos Guastavino (Argentina)
- Camargo Guarnieri (Brazil)
- Juan Carlos Moreno González (Paraguay)
- Jaurès Lamarque-Pons (Uruguay)
- Rodolfo Coelho de Souza (Brazil)
- Aylton Escobar (Brazil)
- Eduardo Bértola (Argentina)
- Héctor Tosar (Uruguay)
- Edson Zampronha (Brazil)

Vol. 6:

- Ricardo Castillo (Guatemala)
- Angel Lasala (Argentina)
- Ernest Mahle (Brazil)
- Alfredo Rugeles (Venezuela)
- Marcos Câmara (Brazil)
- Nicolás Pérez González (Paraguay)
- Gerardo Gandini (Argentina)
- Eduardo Cáceres (Chile)
- Juan José Iturriberry (Uruguay)

Vol. 7:

- José Pablo Moncayo (México)
- Cacilda Borges Barbosa (Brazil)
- Silvestre Revueltas (México)
- Julián Aguirre (Argentina)
- Nilson Lombardi (Brazil)
- Amaral Vieira (Brazil)
- Acario Cotapos (Chile)
- Marisa Rezende (Brazil)
- Edmundo Villani-Côrtes (Brazil)
- Graciela Paraskevaídis (Argentina-Uruguay)
