= Wila Qullu (Bolivia-Chile) =

Mountain in Bolivia

- Cerro Laguna
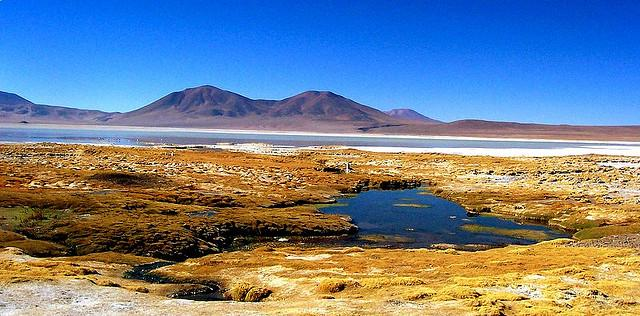
- Salar de Huasco, Salar de Huasco National Park, Chile. Wila Qullu (on the left, half visible), Waylla East and Waylla West on the border of Bolivia and Chile

Highest point
- Elevation: 4,948 m (16,234 ft)
- Coordinates: 20°20′13″S 68°39′38″W

Geography
- Location within Bolivia
- Location: Bolivia, Potosí Department; Chile, Tarapacá Region
- Parent range: Andes, Cordillera Occidental

Wila Qullu (Aymara wila red or blood, qullu mountain, "red mountain", Hispanicized spelling Wila Kkollu), also Cerro Laguna (Spanish cerro hill, laguna lake, lagoon), is a 4,948-metre-high (16,234 ft) mountain in the Andes located on the border of Bolivia and Chile in the Cordillera Occidental. Wila Qullu lies between the Salar de Huasco in the Tarapacá Region of Chile and the Salar de Uyuni in Bolivia. On the Bolivian side it is situated in the Potosí Department, Daniel Campos Province, Llica Municipality, Canquella Canton, north of the village of Pampa Anta.

== See also ==
- Ch'alla Qullu
- Ch'api Qullu
- Waylla
- List of mountains in the Andes
