= Eduardo Caba =

Bolivian composer

- Born: 1890; Potosi, Bolivia
- Died: 1953 (aged 62–63); La Paz, Bolivia
- Era: 20th century

Eduardo Caba (1890–1953) was a Bolivian nationalist composer, a pianist and a music professor. He spent the most part of his professional life in Buenos Aires and his last ten years in La Paz.

== Biography ==
His parents were "Dr. Gregorio Caba, a distinguished Bolivian doctor, and Adelina Balsalia, an Italian lady of high culture and with a fine musical spirit". According to Salas and Pauletto (1938), Eduardo Caba's mother was his first music teacher.

In 1926, he moved to Buenos Aires and completed his higher studies in harmony. There he attended the classes of the Argentine composer Felipe Boero. In 1927, he obtained a scholarship by the Bolivian government allowing him to improve his skills in Madrid where he was the alumnus of Joaquín Turina and of Bartolomé Pérez Casas. However, the Bolivian government withdrew its commitment and Caba was forced to give up his studies. Shortly later, Caba returned to Buenos Aires and integrated into Argentine society, where he made good friends. His reputation grew, and his works were played at the Teatro Colón. In 1942, Caba moved from Buenos Aires to his home country after being appointed director of the National Conservatory of Music of La Paz. He also lived for two years in Montevideo with his family.

From the outset of his career Caba won the praise of the renowned Spanish musicologist Adolfo Salazar, as Salas and Pauletto underscore, citing Salazar's comments in his book Música y músicos de hoy (1928) as well as his articles in the Spanish journal El Sol.

His compositions were interpreted at the La Revue musicale in Paris by the pianist Ricardo Viñes, one of the most active promoters of Caba's works, and the French composer and founder of the Revue, Henry Prunières, considered Caba as one of the most important representatives of musical values in Latin America. Ninon Vallin, the French soprano who often stayed in Buenos Aires and was present at twenty seasons of the Teatro Colón, has also interpreted Caba's works. Other promoters of the music of Caba include Beatriz Balzi and Mariana Alandia.

== Style ==
The musicologists Salas and Pauletto consider Caba as an "intuitive composer with the vernacular motives of his homeland". The vernacular aspects are probably the most characteristic of Caba's musical language.

But the intuitive character of Caba's work is probably the most interesting, and it is interesting to understand the origin of this "intuition". Salas and Pauletto, who knew personally Eduardo Caba, explain it in the following way:

Nacido al lado de los indios, con quienes convivió en su infancia, no es extraño que asimilara integralmente sus medios de expresión musical. Caba no es un folclorista, en la estricta acepción de la palabra, sino un compositor intuitivo, que crea sus motivos como lo hacen los mismos indígenas, es decir, tratando de transmitir sus tradiciones, danzas y cantares, porque él mismo se siente engendro del terruño, indio también.

A representative example of Caba's music is his dance Kollavina, recently interpreted by the Bolivian guitarist Marcos Puña, and presented in the book of the two aforementioned musicologists.

== Private life ==
Eduardo Caba married María del Carmen Huergo in Buenos Aires and they had two children, Gregorio et María Adelia.

== Main works ==
- 9 Aires indios (de Bolivia)
- Aires indios de Bolivia:
  - Andantino
  - Con reposo
  - Reposado muy expresivo
  - Calmado y expresivo
  - Andantino
  - Allegretto
- Ocho motivos folklóricos de los valles de Bolivia (eight folkloric motives from the valleys of Bolivia):
  - Allegretto
  - Alegre moderato y expresivo
  - Alegre y ritmo justo
  - Andante expresivo
  - Allegretto expresivo
  - Un poco lento y expresivo
  - Moderato
  - Alegre moderato
- Flor de bronce
- Kapuri (La Hilandera)
- Flor de amor
- Kollavina
- Indiecita
- Kori-Killa (Luna de oro)
- Himno al Sol, (version for piano)
- Potosí, Symphonic poem containing:
  - Leyenda Kechua
  - Monólogo Kechua
  - Danza Kechua
- Danzata, containing four dances for lute quartet

== Bibliography ==
- (in Spanish) Adolfo Salazar (1928). Música y músicos de hoy. Madrid: Editorial El Mundo Latino.
- (in Spanish) Samuel J.A. Salas, Pedro I. Pauletto, Pedro J.S. Salas (1938). Historia de la Música. Second volume: América Latina. Buenos Aires: Editorial José Joaquín de Araujo.
- (in Spanish) Enzo Valenti Ferro (1983). Las voces: Teatro Colón, 1908-1982. Buenos Aires: Ediciones de Arte Gaglianone, ISBN 950-9004-36-7.
- (in Spanish) Franklin Anaya Arze (1994). La música en Latinoamérica y en Bolivia. Cochabamba: Editorial Serrano.
