= Nilson Lombardi =

- Born: January 3, 1926; Sorocaba, Brazil
- Died: April 9, 2008 (aged 82) Sorocaba, Brazil
- Genres: Classical
- Occupations: Composer, performer
- Instrument: Piano

Nilson Lombardi (January 3, 1926 – April 9, 2008) was a pianist, composer and Brazilian maestro with a vast contribution to the classical music in many countries. His compositions have also been interpreted in international recitals and recordings on disc by Eudoxia de Barros, Attilio Mastrogiovanni, Orlando Retroz, Beatriz Balzi, and others.

Lombarti was awarded the APCA prize of São Paulo Association of Art Critics of classical music lovers and artists influencing contemporary classical music in Brazil and abroad. Nilson Lombardi worked with Mozart Camargo Guarnieri (1907–1993), one of the most important contributors of Brazilian music. Lombardi was defined as a follower of the work of Guarnieri.

Nilson Lombardi's family made the donation collection of the composer at the Tatuí Musical Conservatory "Dr. Carlos Campos", the Conservatory of Tatuí. The collection includes about 600 items, including books, music, trophies, a typewriter, and every work of Nilson Lombardi.

Singer and producer Marcia Mah released the book "Nilson Lombardi Complete Works" in 2002, published by TCM. It has 408 pages of biography and pieces for solo piano, voice and piano, chamber music, symphony orchestra and choral singing. The book was produced with funds from the Sorocaba Cultural Incentive Law and sent to all public music universities in the country.

== Complete works ==
List of complete works of Nilson Lombardi

=== Piano ===
- Twelve Ponteios
- Six Miniatures
- Three Cantinelas
- Theme and twelve variations of "Mucama Bonita"
- Estudo number one
- Reminiscenses Homage to Schumann
- Sleep baby
- Ponteio "Aunt Serenade"
- Homage to Ravel
- Miniature 14
- Miniature 16
- Miniature 17

=== Ciclo Miniatura para Piano a Quatro Mãos ===
- Acalanto 1 and 2
- Baião 1 and 2
- Choro 1 and 2
- Toada 1 and 2
- Waltz 1 and 2

=== Miniature cycles for two pianos ===
- Acalanto 1 and 2
- Baião 1 and 2
- Choro 1 and 2
- Toada 1 and 2
- Waltz 1 and 2

=== Piano and choral ===
- Beach sing
- Full stars night
- Three Folk's songs
- Cabôco of the Black Land
- In the Umbando I am the Guiné
- Give me a balance to my side
- There's no Love
- The Heart Shadow
- Christmas Meditation
- Come, my love

=== Chamber music ===
- Cantinela for Piano and Clarinet
- Two Voices Invention
- Trio Trombone, Trumpet and Piano
- Cantinela for Strings Orchestra
- Toada
- Acalanto
- Ponteio for Strings Orchestra

=== Symphonic orchestra ===
- Six Miniatures
- Orchestra Suite
- Double
- Waltz
- Baião
- Six Variations of a Theme about Schoenberg
- Three Cantinelas
- Cadence for Concert in F Minor for Piano and Strings of J. S. Bach
- Cadence for Concert in A bemol, Opus 19, of Beethoven

=== Choral sings ===
- Teresa
- Where do you go Helena?
- Canide Iune
- Ina Ina Mojubara
- Uiê Ôri Rumbá
- Etiô
- 3rd Centennial of Sorocaba Hymn
- Cantata "The Zumbi's Death"
