= Llica Municipality =

- Municipality
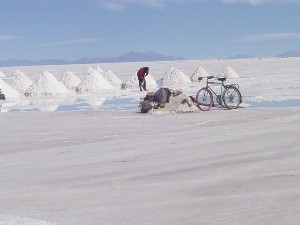
- A farmer is digging salt on the Salar de Uyuni

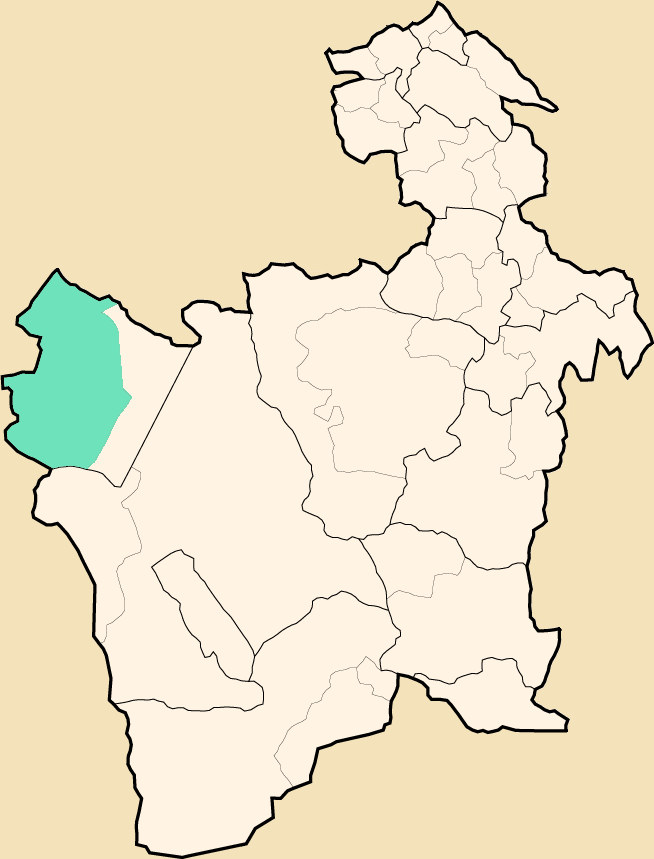
- Location within Potosí Department

- Location within Bolivia
- Coordinates: 20°10′S 68°22′W
- Country: Bolivia
- Department: Potosí Department
- Province: Daniel Campos Province
- Seat: Llica

Area
  - Total: 1,263 sq mi (3,272 km^{2})
- Elevation: 13,000 ft (4,000 m)

Population (2001)
  - Total: 2,901
  - Ethnicities: Aymara
- Time zone: UTC-4 (BOT)

Llica Municipality is the first municipal section of the Daniel Campos Province in the Potosí Department in Bolivia. Its seat is Llica.

The municipality is situated on the western side of the Salar de Uyuni bordering Tahua Municipality. To the north it is bordered by the Oruro Department, to the south by the Nor Lipez Province and to the west by Chile.

== Geography ==
Some of the highest mountains of the municipality are listed below:

- Chayanta
- Chuku Qullu
- Ch'alla Qullu
- Ch'api Qullu
- Ch'iyar Qullu
- Iru Phutunqu
- Jaruma
- Mancha
- Muru Qullu
- Pampa Qullu
- Pata Chuwa Chuwani
- Piqa
- Pukara
- Phaq'u Qullu
- Qhuya Qhuyani
- Tara Qullu
- Tankani
- Tutuni
- Thuwa
- Umani
- Wallqani
- Waylla
- Waylla Q'awa
- Wila Jaqhi
- Wila Qullu

== Subdivision ==
The municipality consists of the following cantons:

- Cahuana
- Canquella
- Chacoma
- Llica
- Palaya
- San Pablo de Napa
- Tres Cruces

== The people ==
The people are predominantly indigenous citizens of Aymara descent.

Ethnic group	%
Quechua	5.7
Aymara	86.9
Guaraní, Chiquitos, Moxos	0.1
Not indigenous	7.1
Other indigenous groups	0.3
