= Llica =

Coordinates: 19°51′S 68°15′W

- Town
- Interactive map of Llica
- Country: Bolivia
- Department: Potosí Department
- Province: Daniel Campos Province
- Municipality: Llica Municipality

Population (2001)
  - Total: 553
- Time zone: UTC-4 (BOT)

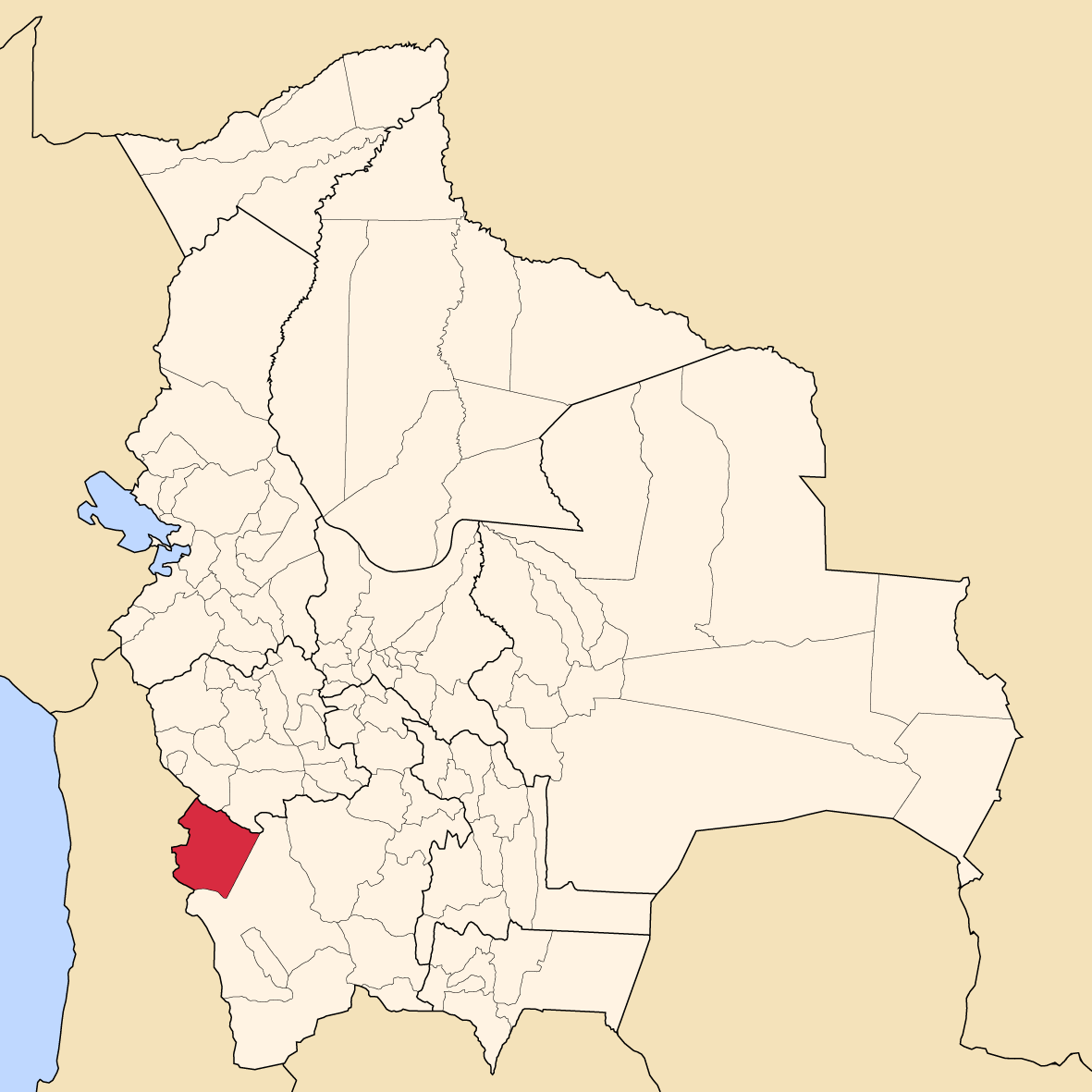
Map of Bolivia highlighting Daniel Campos province

Llica is a small town in Bolivia.

== History ==
There is evidence to suggest that this small village has existed for over 500 years, probably since before the discovery of America, for the Indians of south-eastern the current Bolivia established lands dedicated to the cultivation of "papa" (potatoes), To provide food to the caravans crossing the plateau, and Llica is mentioned as one such markings Goat Paper, A testament to revisit the Viceroy Francisco de Toledo to the region, dating from 1571.
