= Javier Parrado =

Bolivian classical composer (born 1964)

Javier Parrado (born 1964) is a Bolivian classical composer, whose works have been performed in Europe and Latin America.

== Biography ==
Javier Parrado received his musical education at the National School of Music and the National Conservatory of Music in La Paz, Bolivia under the guidance of Cergio Prudencio and Alberto Villalpando . After graduation, he studied in seminars with Franco Donatoni, Edgar Alandia , Reinhard Febel, Coriún Aharonián, Victor Rasgado, and Graciela Paraskevaidis.

Several of his compositions were performed in America and Europe. In Bolivia, he worked for many years as an arranger of folkloric music and resident composer of the National Symphony Orchestra, as well as a teacher, composer, arranger, and researcher with various compositions and texts published.

TreMedia publishes his music for guitar. Several of his articles about Bolivian music have been also published.

He is part of the project “Uyaricuna, ist'asiñani, nos escucharemos” in association with Artekorp, with the objective to diffuse the diverse musical expressions originated from the Bolivian territory and Andean land to project them into symphonic and chamber music.

=== Awards and honors ===
Parrado received first prizes in the Adrián Patiño composition competition (La Paz, Bolivia, 1993 and 2009 ,) and the guitar composition contest Agustín Barrios Mangoré (Salzburg, Austria, 2001). He also received Best Soundtrack in the Amalia de Gallardo Video Contest (La Paz, Bolivia, 2004), a special mention to his choral work "Tanta Luz que dexan" (Islas Canarias, Spain, 2004), and the 2009 Medal for Artistic Merit of Asociación Boliviana Pro Arte (La Paz, Bolivia, July 2009)

== Selected works ==
=== Solo Instrument ===
- Estaciones para flauta (1993) for Flute
- Sendas Lunares (1997) for Guitar. Christoph Jäagin, guitar and editor
- Sombra y Agua (1997–98) for Piano. Marco Ciccone, piano
- Ellas ¿y Bach? (2004) for Violin

=== Electroacoustic music ===
- Inti Yana (1994) for Tape

=== Chamber Ensemble ===
- Presencia alterna (1991) Text von Eduardo Mitre for Sopran and Ensemble
- Llamadas (1991, rev 96) for Violin and Marimba. Javier Pinell, violin
- Salto al Alba (1996) for Guitar and Flute. Alvaro Montenegro, flauta y Gentaro Takada, Guitar
- Ciclo sobre textos de Goethe (1999) for Voice and Piano
- Pirqa, brasa y ceniza (2002), for 3 Zampoñas, 3 Flutes (C, piccolo und Bass, Oboe with sord. ad lib). Premiere: Ensemble Antara. Audio
- Noche Cúbica (2005) for Violin and Ensemble

=== Choral Music ===
- Tanta luz que dexan (2004) for mixed Choir

=== Orchestra ===
- Reposada brasa (2002) for Orchestra
- Aceras líquidas y pasos lunares (2005) for Orchestra
- Alegres Prestes, homenaje al Gran Poder (2009) for symphonic band.

Selection of “Uyaricuna ist`asiñani, nos escucharemos” (2006):

- Tinkus for Orchestra
- Chiriwanos for Orchestra
- A cielo abierto (2007) para Orquesta sinfónica

=== Selection of orchestral arrangements ===
- Voice and orchestra: songs of Enriqueta Ulloa, Emma Junaro, Los Kjarkas, Yalo Cuellar, Esther Marisol, etc.
- Charango and orquesta: "El Nacimiento del Charango" of William Centellas
- Quena and orquesta: "Sapitay Baguala", and "Yurita" of Juan Lazzaro Méndolas
- Bolivian folkloric music: Novia Santa Cruz, Soledad(Implorando), Llamerada, Diabladas, Destacamento 111b.

== Publications and references ==
- Tinkus for orchestra in YouTube:
- New arrangements:
- PARRADO, Javier 2006 “Los aires nacionales en el siglo XIX. Apuntes sobre la notación musical”. En: Fundación del Banco Central de Bolivia, Revista Cultural. Año X – Nº 43 / Noviembre – diciembre 2006
- ALANDIA, Mariana y PARRADO, Javier. 2004 “El Fondo Bolivia, una mirada a nuestra historia musical bajo la óptica del repertorio de piano”. En Temas en la crisis. Las culturas de Bolivia. Número 65-IV-2004
- ALANDIA, Mariana y PARRADO, Javier. 2003 “A la vera del piano”. En: T’inkazos, Revista Boliviana de Ciencias Sociales cuatrimestral del Programa de Investigación Estratégica de Bolivia (PIEB). Número 14 Junio 2003
- PARRADO, Javier 2002 “Laberinto y código sonoros”. En Ciencia y Cultura Revista de la Universidad Católica Boliviana San Pablo. Número 11 diciembre Año 2002.
- SEOANE, Carlos; EICHMANN, Andrés; PARRADO, Javier; SOLIZ, Carmen; ALARCÓN, Estela y SÁNCHEZ, Sergio. 2000 Melos Damus Vocibus, Códices Cantorales Platenses. Proinsa. La Paz
- http://www.tremediamusicedition.com/komponisten/parrado.htm
- Festival Aspekte: https://web.archive.org/web/20110531200448/http://www.aspekte-salzburg.at/Biographien/100.html
- Unesco: http://portal.unesco.org/culture/en/ev.php-URL_ID=16129&URL_DO=DO_TOPIC&URL_SECTION=201.html
- Conservatoire national supérieur de musique et de danse de Paris (Library): Pirqa, brasa y ceniza http://www.musiquecontemporaine.fr/record/oai:cnsmdp-aloes:0749578
- FUNDACIÓN CULTURAL “LA PLATA” 2005, Historia de la Cultura Boliviana en el Siglo XX. “I La Música”. Agua del Inisterio”. Sucre, Bolivia.
