= Daniel Campos Province =

Daniel Campos
- Province
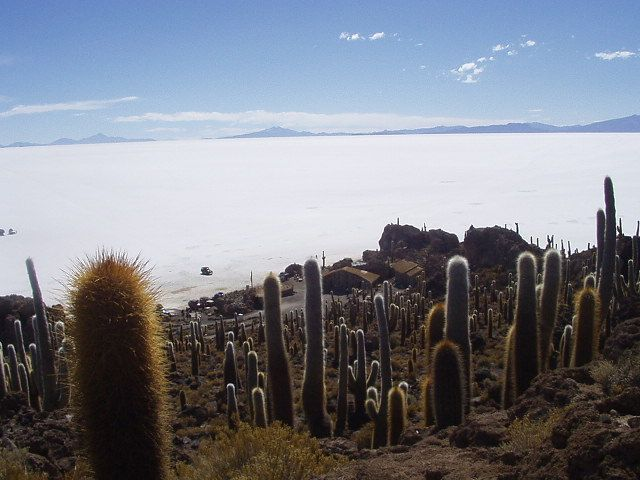
- Isla del Pescado in Salar de Uyuni, Daniel Campos Province

- Flag Seal

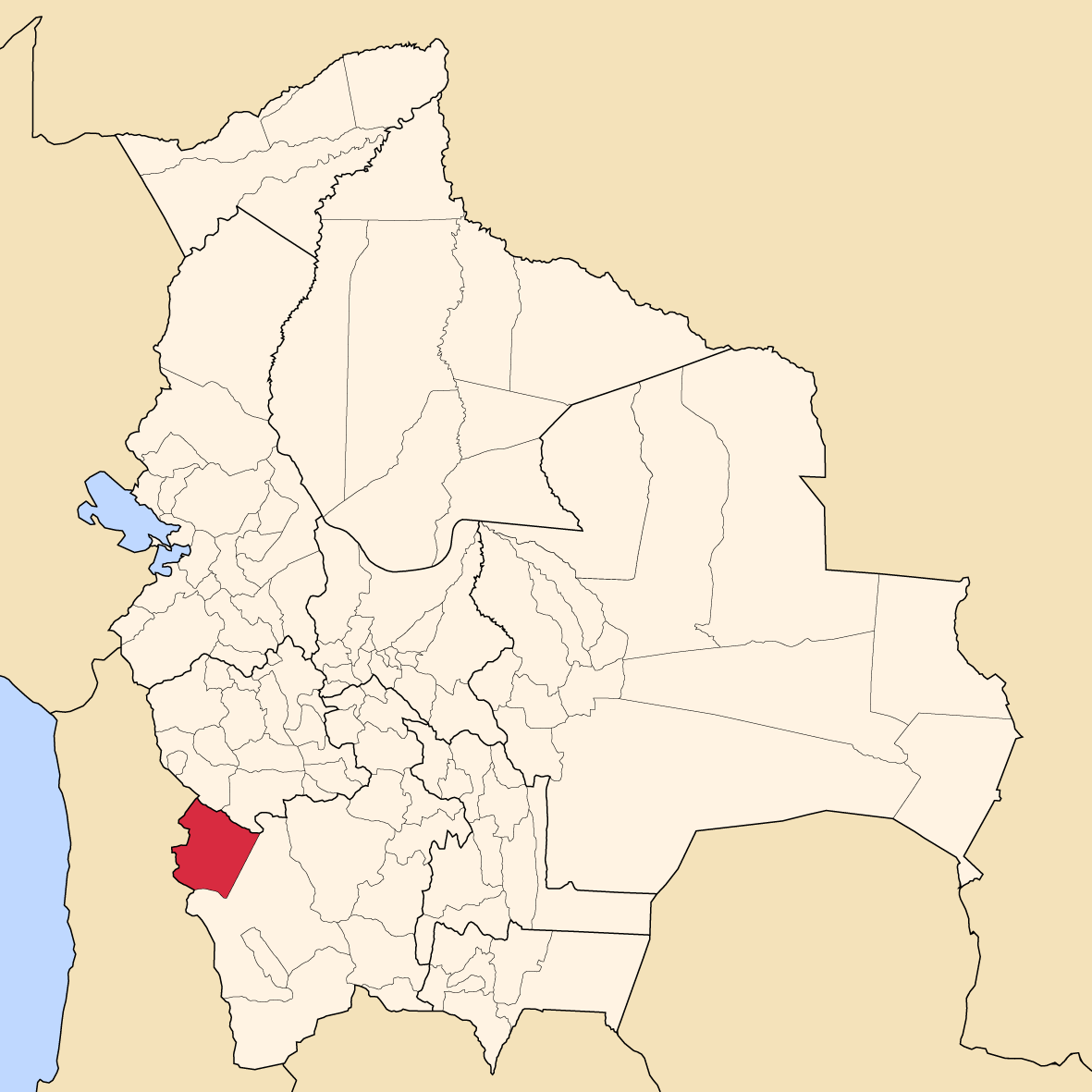
- Location of the Daniel Campos Province within Bolivia

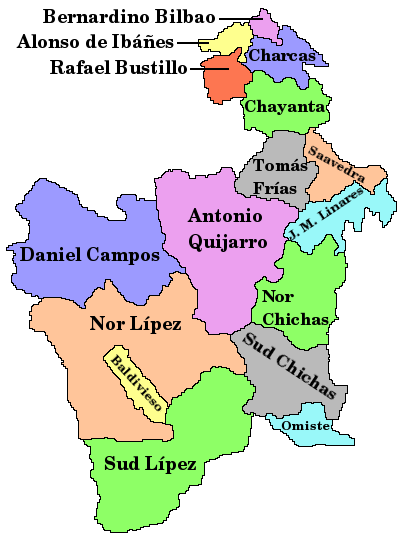
- Provinces of the Potosí Department
- Coordinates: 20°7′S 67°48′W
- Country: Bolivia
- Department: Potosí Department
- Municipalities: 2
- Cantons: 13
- Capital: Llica

Area
  - Total: 3,995 sq mi (10,347 km^{2})

Population (2024 census)
  - Total: 5,711
  - Density: 1.430/sq mi (0.5519/km^{2})
  - Ethnicities: Aymara
- Time zone: UTC-4 (BOT)
- Area code: BO.PO.DC

Daniel Campos is a province in the north-western parts of the Bolivian Potosí Department. It is named after the poet Daniel Campos who originated from this area. The capital of the province is Llica.

== Location ==
Daniel Campos province is one of sixteen provinces in the Potosí Department. It is located between 19° 25' and 20° 50' South and between 66° 49' and 68° 47' West. It borders Oruro Department in the north, the Republic of Chile in the west, Nor Lípez Province in the south, and Antonio Quijarro Province in the east.

The province extends over 240 km from east to west and 180 km from north to south.

== Geography ==
The province is situated in the salt flats of the southern Altiplano, more than 65% of the province being covered by Salar de Uyuni. Salar de Uyuni is situated at an average level of 3,657 m amsl, the highest point of the province is Tutuni (Alto Totoni) (5,740 m) in the Cordillera Sillaguay on the Chilean border. The climate is that of an arid high mountain region, with yearly precipitation of below 200 mm, even less than 100 mm in the extreme west. Average daily temperatures are 0 to 5 °C all over the year.

Some of the highest mountains of the province are listed below:

- Chayanta
- Chuku Qullu
- Ch'alla Qullu
- Ch'api Qullu
- Ch'iyar Qullu
- Iru Phutunqu
- Jaruma
- Jisk'a Wat'a
- Lluqu Lluqu
- Mancha
- Muru Qullu
- Muruq'u Qullu
- Pampa Qullu
- Pata Chuwa Chuwani
- Piqa
- Pukara
- Phaq'u Qullu
- Qhuya Qhuyani
- Tara Qullu
- Tankani
- Tutuni
- Thuwa
- Umani
- Wallqani
- Waylla
- Waylla Q'awa
- Wila Jaqhi
- Wila Qullu
- Wila Wilani

== Division ==
The province comprises two municipalities which are partly further subdivided into cantons.

Section	Municipality	Seat
1st	Llica Municipality	Llica
2nd	Tahua Municipality	Tahua

== Population ==
The main language of the province is Spanish, spoken by 80%, while 59% of the population speak Aymara. The population increased from 4,630 inhabitants (1992 census) to 5,067 (2001 census), an increase of 9.4%.

87% of the population have no access to electricity, 91% have no sanitary facilities. 73% of the population are employed in agriculture, 3% in mining, 2% in industry, 22% in general services. 87% of the population are Catholics, 8% Protestants.

The people are predominantly indigenous citizens of Aymara descent.

Ethnic group	Llica Municipality (%)	Tahua Municipality (%)
Quechua	5.7	6.0
Aymara	86.9	90.5
Guaraní, Chiquitos, Moxos	0.1	0.1
Not indigenous	7.1	3.3
Other indigenous groups	0.3	0.0

== Places of interest ==
- Salar de Uyuni with the rocky outcrops of Inkawasi and Isla del Pescado which are situated within the province

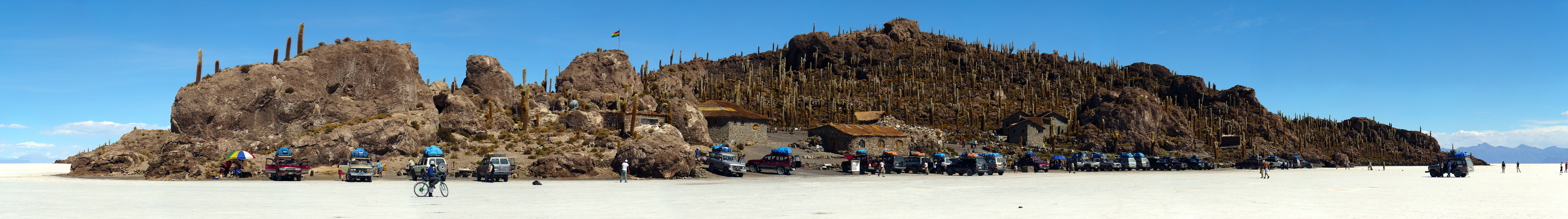
Inkawasi Island in Salar de Uyuni
