= Tomás Frías Autonomous University =

Public university in Potosí, Bolivia

- Universidad Autónoma Tomás Frías
- Tomás Frías Autonomous University Coat Of Arms
- Type: Public university
- Established: October 15, 1892; 133 years ago
- Affiliations: CEUB
- Vice-Chancellor: M. Sc. Lic. Víctor Hugo Villegas
- Rector: Dr. Ing. Pedro Guido López Cortés
- Location: Potosí, Tomás Frías Province, Bolivia; 19°35′02″S 65°45′26″W
- Website: www.uatf.edu.bo

The Tomás Frías Autonomous University (Universidad Autónoma Tomás Frías or UATF) is a public university located in Potosí, Bolivia. It was established in 1892.

== History ==
Officially created by Supreme Decree of October 15, 1892, which in the first Article states. University Districts of Potosi and Oruro are erected. "Se erigen los distritos Universitarios de Potosí y Oruro"

It began operating from the Free Faculty of Law in 1876, subordinated to Cancelariato of Chuquisaca.

On November 30, 1892, a Regulatory decree by which provides that the departments of Potosí and Oruro are independent of cancelariatos of Chuquisaca and La Paz respectively, is issued. While the law does not gave more space to university councils, are restricted to their Faculties of Law.

On February 3, 1893, the University Council of Potosi was installed, under the leadership of chancellor and president Dr. Nicanor Careaga.

On October 1937 the autonomy to the university district of Potosí is officially recognized. Dr. Alberto Saavedra Nogales becomes the first autonomous rector.

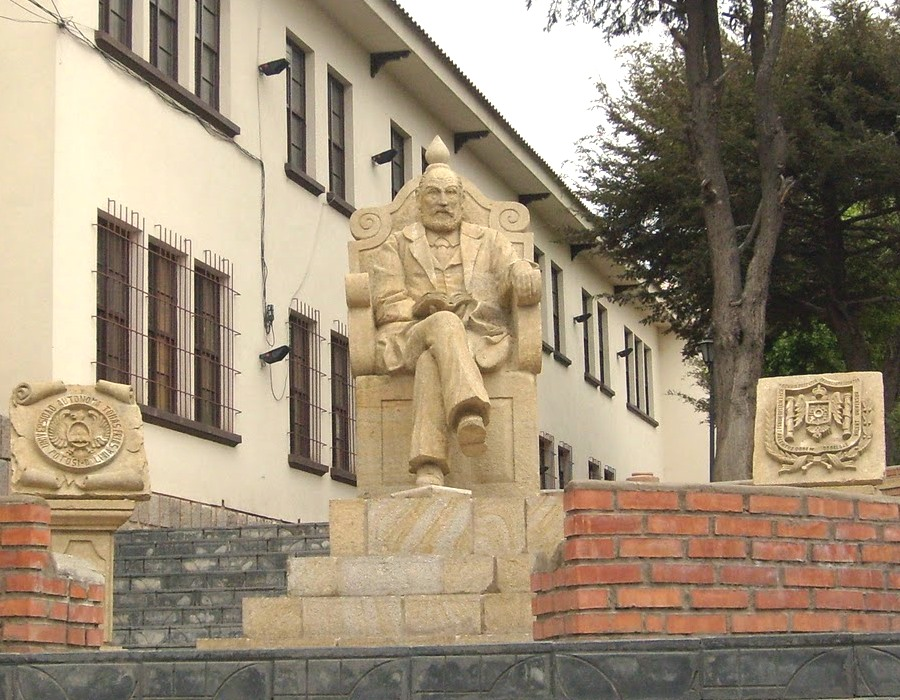
Statue in honor of Dr. Tomás Frías Ametller located in the Tomás Frías Autonomous University

In 1924 President of Bolivia Bautista Saavedra Mallea issues the Act of November 29, 1924 (enacted on December 2, 1924) changing the name of the Potosí University to Tomás Frías Autonomous University honoring Tomás Frías Ametller, recognizing his contribution to the organization of the university system.

Currently Tomás Frías Autonomous University is one of the 15 universities recognized by CEUB (Executive Committee of Bolivian Universities), the maximum authority in the Bolivian university system.

The university has twelve Faculties with 42 Schools.

== Campus ==
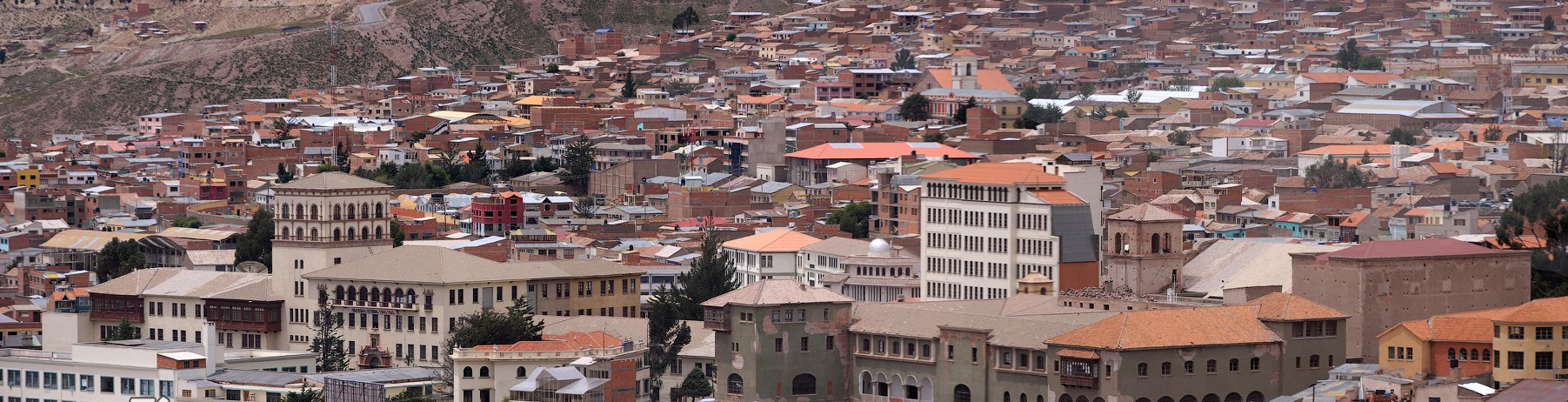
Panoramic view of the Central Campus of the Universidad Autónoma Tomás Frías

The Central Campus of the Tomás Frías Autonomous University is located at "El Maestro" Avuenue - "Cívica" Avenue, is home for many of the Faculties, other Faculties and the School of Medicine have own buildings distributed in the central area of the Potosi city, currently is under construction a University Citadel that will work with different faculties.

The citadel will be a modern building complex comprising five blocks properly equipped. The perimeter on which is seated, reaches 80 thousand square meters, is currently running the facility for lithium carbonate production "Technikum", which is dependent of the Tomás Frías Autonomous University and Freiberg University of Mining and Technology.

== Colleges ==
The university has the following colleges

- Faculty of Arts
- Faculty of Agricultural and Animal Sciences
- Faculty of Economics, Finance and Administration
- Faculty of Pure Sciences
- Faculty of Humanities and Social Sciences
- Faculty of Law
- Faculty of Engineering
- Faculty of Geology
- Faculty of Mining Engineering
- Faculty of Technology
- Faculty of Health Sciences
- Faculty of Medicine

== Research ==
- Technikum lithium carbonate production facility
- Bolivian Institute for High Altitude Biology
- Mining Environmental Research Center (CIMA project)

== Notable alumni ==
- Florencio Ruck Pozadas Cordero, Musician, percussionist and composer
- Carlos Medinaceli, Writer and literary critic
