= Ch'alla Qullu (Bolivia-Chile) =

Mountain in Bolivia

- Location within Bolivia

Highest point
- Elevation: 4,345 m (14,255 ft)
- Coordinates: 20°3′S 68°40′W

Geography
- Location: Bolivia, Potosí Department; Chile, Tarapacá Region
- Parent range: Andes, Cordillera Occidental

Ch'alla Qullu (Aymara ch'alla sand, also an Aymara rite or custom, qullu mountain, "sand mountain" or "ch'alla mountain", Hispanicized spellings Challacollo, Challa Kkollu) is a mountain in the Andes located on the border of Bolivia and Chile in the Cordillera Occidental. It is about 4,345 metres (14,255 ft) high. Ch'alla Qullu lies north-east of the Salar de Huasco in the Tarapacá Region of Chile and the mountain Piqa, on the border and west of the Salar de Uyuni and Canquella in Bolivia. On the Bolivian side it is situated in the Potosí Department, Daniel Campos Province, Llica Municipality, Canquella Canton.

== See also ==
- Ch'alla Qullu (La Paz)
- Wila Qullu (Bolivia-Chile)
- List of mountains in the Andes
