= Taapaca =

Volcano in Chile

Taapaca, Tara Paka
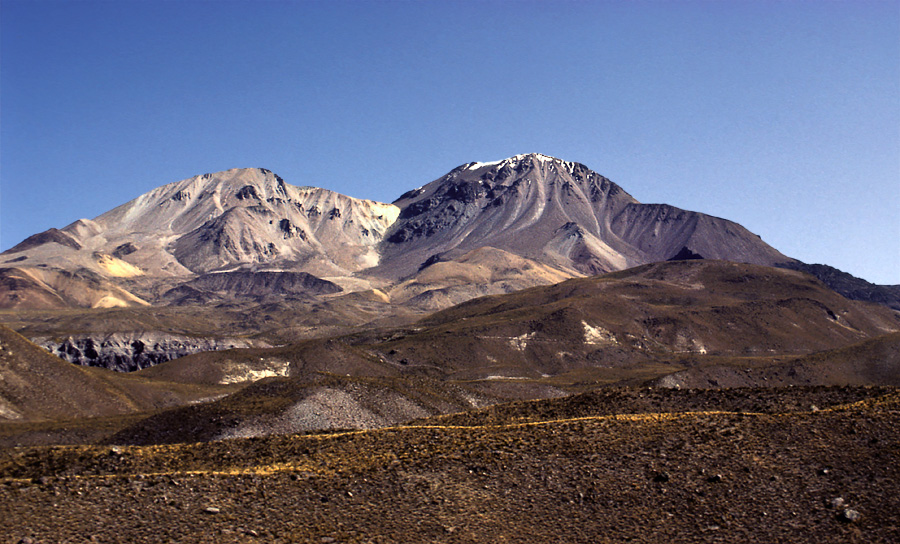
- Nevados de Putre, Taapaca volcano (right)

Highest point
- Elevation: 5,860 m (19,230 ft)
- Coordinates: 18.1°S 69.5°W

Geography
- Location within Arica y Parinacota
- Location: Chile
- Parent range: Andes

Geology
- Mountain type: Complex volcano
- Last eruption: 320 BCE ± 50 years

Climbing
- First ascent: Inca, pre-Columbian

Taapaca is a Holocene volcanic complex in northern Chile's Arica y Parinacota Region. Located in the Chilean Andes, it is part of the Central Volcanic Zone of the Andean Volcanic Belt, one of four distinct volcanic chains in South America. The town of Putre lies at the southwestern foot of the volcano.

Like other volcanoes of the Central Volcanic Zone, Taapaca formed from the subduction of the Nazca Plate beneath the South America Plate. It lies on the western margin of the Altiplano high plateau, on top of older volcanic and sedimentary units. Taapaca has mainly erupted dacite, in the form of numerous lava domes, although an andesitic stratovolcano is also present.

Volcanic activity at Taapaca occurred in several stages starting during the Plio-Pleistocene. The emplacement of lava domes was often followed by their collapse and the formation of block-and-ash avalanches, and parts of the volcano underwent sector collapses (large landslides). It was at first assumed that activity ended during the Pleistocene, but late eruptions occurred until 2,300 years ago; the latest is dated to 320 BCE. The Chilean Geological Service monitors the volcano as it is a hazard to Putre, but eruptions could also impact local roads and areas as far east as Bolivia.

== Name ==
The term tara paka is Aymara for "two-headed eagle" or "winter (prey) bird", and Quechua for Andean eagle. It is also known as Nevados de Putre; sometimes "Nevados de Putre" is used to refer to the volcanic complex and "Taapaca" to its highest summit. The term taapaca may also be the origin of the term tarapaca and could be an Aymara name for the founder deity Viracocha. Putre in turn appears to mean "sound of falling water" in Aymara.

== Geography and geology ==
Taapaca lies in the Parinacota province of the Arica y Parinacota Region. Northern Chile has little documented volcanic activity during the last ten thousand years with the majority of eruptions documented at Guallatiri, Lascar and Parinacota. The first and the last of these three volcanoes as well as Taapaca itself are part of the Lauca National Park. Taapaca volcano can be reached from the Tambo Quemado-Arica international road.

=== Regional setting ===
Volcanism in the Andes is caused by the subduction of the Nazca Plate and the Antarctic Plate beneath the South America Plate in the Peru-Chile Trench, at rates of 7–9 centimetres per year (2.8–3.5 in/year) and 2 centimetres per year (0.8 in/year), respectively. The process generates fluids that are ultimately responsible for the evolution of subduction-associated magmas when they interact with the mantle wedge above the downgoing plate.

This subduction does not result in volcanic activity everywhere; in places where the process is shallower ("flat slab" subduction) there is no recent volcanism. Volcanism has been ongoing in the Andes since about 185 million years ago, with an increase about 27 million years ago when the Farallon Plate broke up. In 1994, the Andes were considered to contain about 178 volcanoes with Holocene activity, of which 60 were further assumed to have been active during historical time.

=== Local setting ===
Taapaca is part of the Central Volcanic Zone of the Andes, which along with the Northern Volcanic Zone, the Southern Volcanic Zone and the Austral Volcanic Zone is one of the four volcanic belts of the Andes; these volcanic belts are separated by areas where no recent volcanism has occurred.

The Central Volcanic Zone has about 44 active volcanoes and several other caldera/ignimbrite and volcanic field centres. Older volcanoes are often well preserved owing to the dry climate. This volcanic zone features the highest volcanoes in the world, which reach elevations of 5,000–7,000 metres (16,000–23,000 ft) here. The largest historical eruption in the Central Volcanic Zone occurred at Huaynaputina in 1600 and Lascar is the most active volcano in the region; otherwise volcanic activity is poorly recorded as most edifices are remote from human habitation.

Taapaca is located on the western margin of the Altiplano, where the Western Cordillera has developed since the Oligocene. The basement beneath the volcano is formed by several principally volcanic formations, including the Lupica and sedimentary Huaylas formations and the Lauca ignimbrite (2.72 million years old); this basement is of Oligocene to Pliocene age. In some places, a Proterozoic basement formed by amphibolites, gneisses and serpentinites crops out. The volcanoes of Condoriri, Pomerape, Larancagua and Parinacota lie to the east of Taapaca. The area of the volcano is subject to contractional tectonics, with a major thrust fault passing close by, but their relationship to Taapaca's volcanism is not clear.

=== Volcano ===
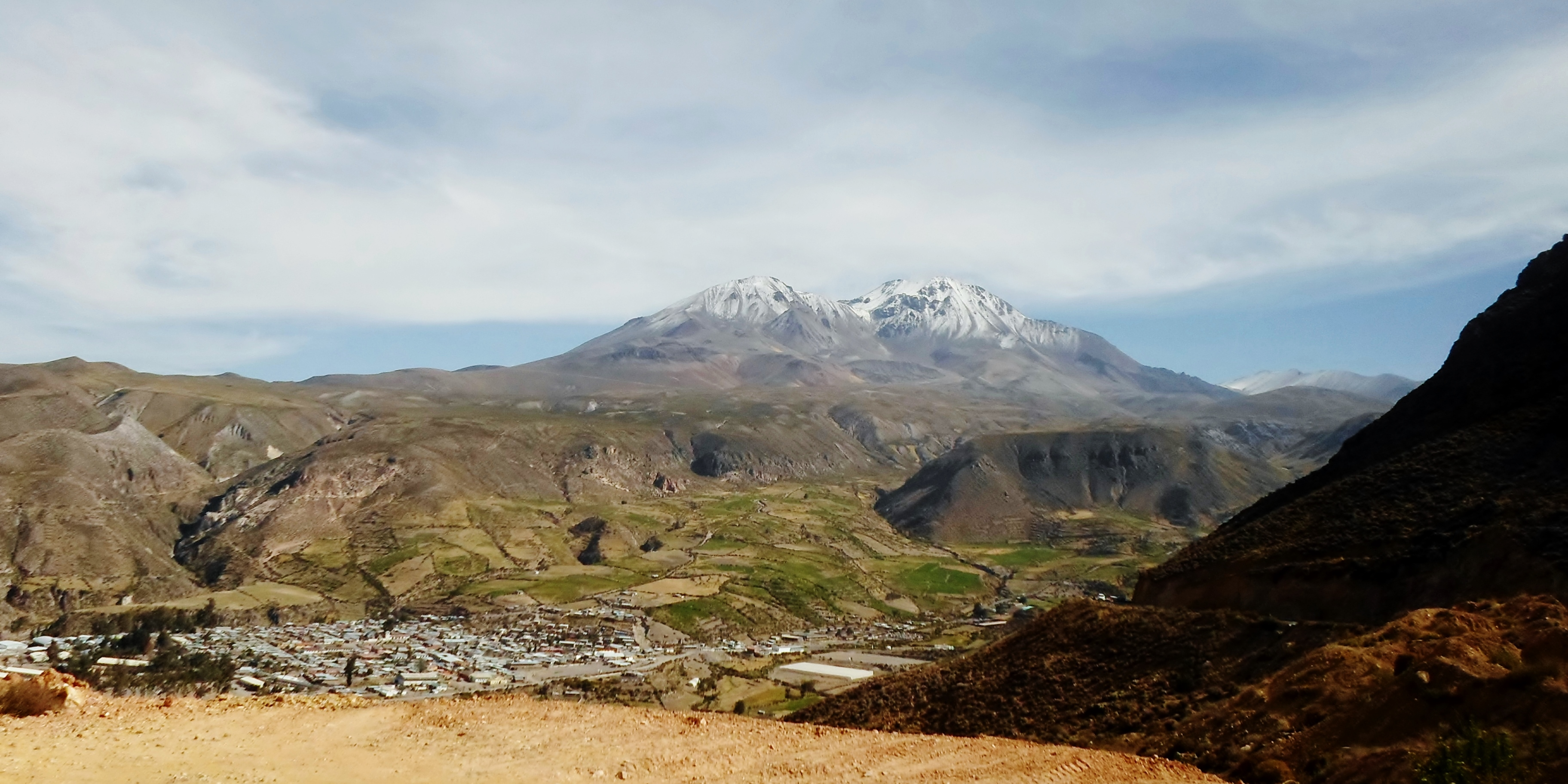
Taapaca rises above Putre

Taapaca reaches a height of 5,860 metres (19,230 ft) above sea level and is a volcanic complex elongated from west to east; Larancagua lies just east of Taapaca. It consists primarily of many overlapping lava domes, with shapes ranging from almost elliptical to circular. Lava flows are uncommon. The volcano has generated an apron of block-and-ash flow deposits especially on the western, southwestern and eastern flanks, which has filled valleys. An andesitic stratovolcano is also present. The total volume of the edifice is about 35 cubic kilometres (8.4 cu mi). Volcanic material covers a surface of 250 square kilometres (97 sq mi).

Just north of the summit, a valley begins and curves clockwise until it opens southwestward onto the flanks of the volcano, and is bordered on the site opposed to the summit by an equally clockwise trending ridge. This valley is drained by the Quebrada Pacollo stream. The main summit is formed by a Holocene dome, with a late Pleistocene dome (known as the Socapave unit) just west of the main summit.

Taapaca is usually covered by snow, but does not feature glaciers other than block glaciers. Moraines have been described as either poorly or well-developed with six separate stages, of which the lowest lies at 4,250 metres (13,940 ft) elevation on the western slopes. Glacially eroded valleys have also been reported; in the past two glaciers descended Taapaca's western slopes while four glaciers developed between Taapaca and Larancagua, draining south. It is the origin of the Lluta River which has its headwaters on the mountain and subsequently flows through a north-south trending valley west of the volcano. The Quebrada Allane drains the northern flank westward into the Lluta River; parts of the mountain drain into the Rio Lauca watershed to the east. Southwest of Taapaca lies Putre, the main town of the northern Altiplano of Chile.

=== Composition ===
Taapaca is mostly formed by potassium-rich dacite, although andesite was erupted early during its activity, and one occurrence of rhyolite is reported. The composition of the rocks has been relatively uniform over the history of the volcano, and is characterized by a calc-alkaline suite of magmas.

Visible minerals found in rocks erupted at Taapaca include amphibole, apatite, biotite, clinopyroxene, orthopyroxene, hornblende, magnetite and hematite, plagioclase, quartz, sanidine which forms characteristic large crystals, and titanite. Dacitic rocks contain mafic inclusions, and such inclusions become increasingly common the younger the rocks they are embedded in are.

The presence of mafic inclusions indicates that magma mixing occurs at Taapaca, with renewed eruptive episodes having been triggered by the injection of new andesitic magma into preexisting dacitic magma chambers. These dacitic magma chambers appear to have relatively small volumes, with little movement of the magma within the chamber except for the episodes where the chambers were heated by new magma injection. Based on geothermometry, a temperature of 870 ± 10 °C (1,598 ± 18 °F) has been inferred for the dacites. The formation of the magma has been hypothesized to occur in several steps. First, basaltic andesite, which is the typical calc-alkaline volcanic arc basalt, mixes with basalt derived from melting of sub-crustal basalt cumulates; then the resulting mixture interacts with rhyodacite melts derived from Proterozoic crustal material. The initial melt contributes most of the material in mafic inclusions and the rhyodacite contributes most of the dacite material.

The principal magma basin appears to be located at 15–20 kilometres (9.3–12.4 mi) depth, although some petrological traits of the erupted rocks indicate a secondary area of petrogenesis at 5–12 kilometres (3.1–7.5 mi) of depth. Fractional crystallization and partial melting are involved in the formation of Taapaca magmas.

Crustal assimilation at depths of more than 40 kilometres (25 mi) was involved in the formation of the dacitic magma and contributes about 18% of the mass of the dacites. Taapaca is constructed on a fairly thick crust and rising magma, and thus undergoes substantial interaction with the crust, meaning that crustal contamination is important in the genesis of Taapaca's magmas. This magma is then transported to shallower levels, where it crystallizes.

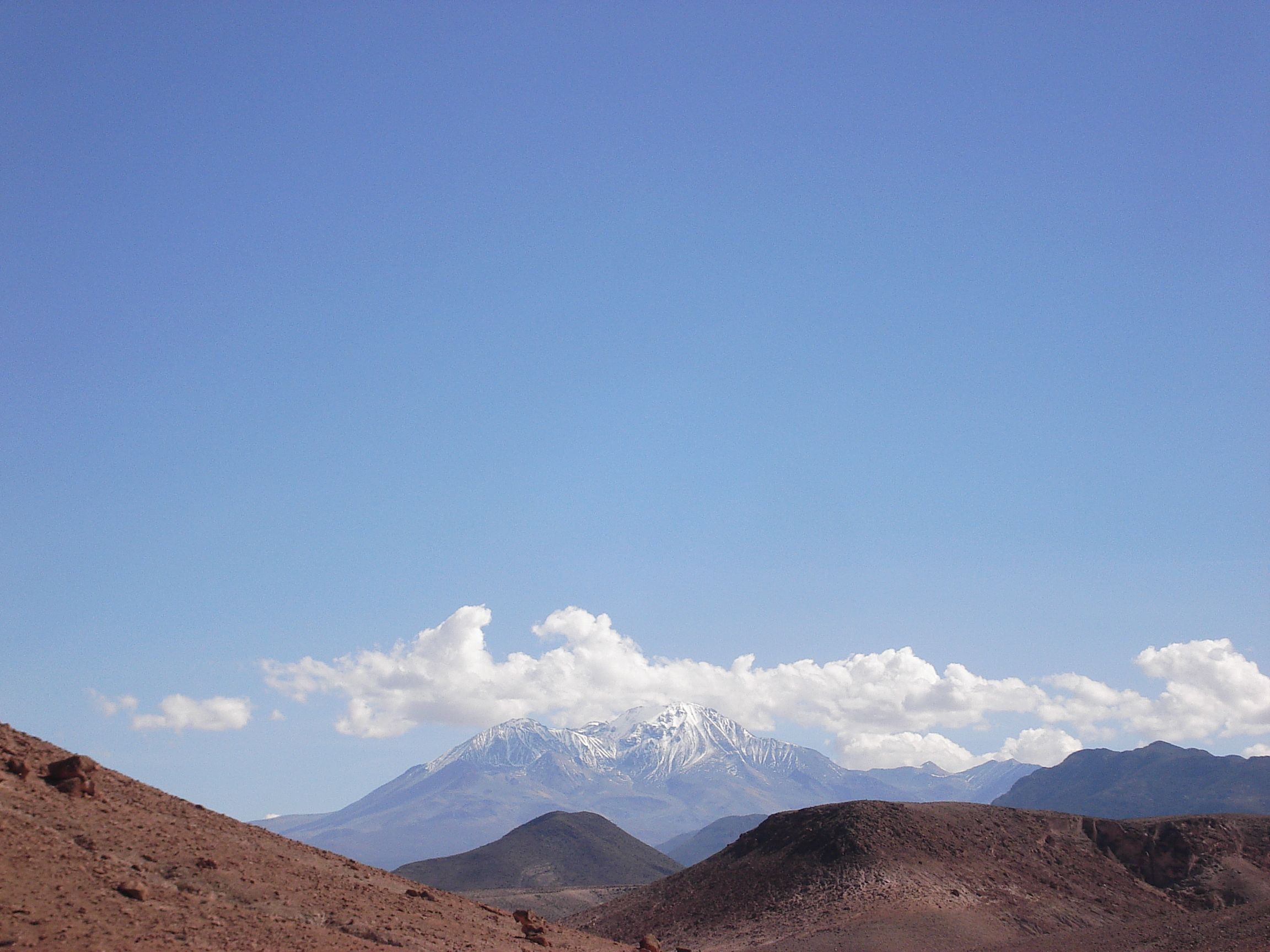
The landscape in the region; Taapaca is the two snow-covered mountains

== Climate and biology ==
Taapaca lies in a region of tropical alpine climate, with large diurnal temperature fluctuations and frost a possibility during the night throughout the year; temperatures range between 0–20 °C (32–68 °F). Unlike most of Chile, precipitation occurs mainly during summer, with snowfall occasionally occurring during June and July; however the climate is largely arid, so vegetation is not widespread.

On the southern side of Taapaca, vegetation consists mostly of Puna shrub and steppe, which becomes shrubland farther west. Cushion plants such as the noticeable Azorella compacta and Polylepis woods also occur, along with wetlands known as bofedales. Woodlands were once more common in the region.

Fauna encountered in the region includes birds, flamingos, guanacos, huemuls, rheas, vicuñas and viscachas, along with pumas and rodents, which are fairly common. Much of the area is protected by the Lauca National Park, which includes Taapaca.

== Eruptive activity ==
Taapaca was originally considered to have been active for the last 1.5 million years during three volcanic phases. Later a fourth stage was identified, and some rocks were interpreted as pre-dating 1.5 million years ago. Eruptions at Taapaca have consisted of lava dome-forming eruptions and explosive activity with avalanches of blocks and ash, which form when lava domes collapse, as has been observed in historical time at the Soufriere Hills and Mount Unzen volcanoes, although these events were much smaller than reconstructed episodes at Taapaca. Only one subplinian eruption has occurred on Taapaca, and tephra fallout deposits are not widespread. Eruptive activity has moved 4–5 kilometres (2.5–3.1 mi) south-southwestward over the history of Taapaca, with activity centred at the top of the edifice.

Late Pleistocene to Holocene activity consisted of discrete episodes lasting about 10,000 years and separated by tens of thousands of years with no recognized activity. Aside from actual eruptions, various types of edifice collapse are recorded at Taapaca including sector collapses of segments of the volcano and mass failure of individual domes, which generated block-and-ash flows.

=== Phases ===
Volcanic activity began 2.7 million years ago. The oldest stage consists of Plio-Pleistocene andesite lava flows, which crop out in two sites on the northern flank and are heavily eroded and partly buried by later volcanic stages. This stage of the edifice most likely consisted of a broad stratovolcano.

Subsequently, between 1.5 and 0.5 million years ago, dacitic lava flows and lava domes constructed most of the northern and eastern flanks of the volcano. Their flow forms, such as flow ridges, are better preserved on the eastern flank, while glacial and hydrothermal alteration has occurred on the northern flank and has degraded the flow forms there. On the northern and northwestern flank, block-and-ash flows up to 13 kilometres (8.1 mi) long and with thicknesses of 20 metres (66 ft), down to less than 2 metres (6 ft 7 in) thick farther away from the volcano, have covered a surface of 110 square kilometres (42 sq mi). They often have lahars up to 5 metres (16 ft) thick cropping out in their distal regions. At this time, Taapaca likely was a large stratovolcano consisting of steep lava domes.

The third stage featured volcanic activity similar to the second stage, with its products covering 18 square kilometres (6.9 sq mi) especially in the central, eastern and southwestern parts of the edifice. Construction of another lava dome complex took place on the southern side of the volcano. Short and thick lava flows are located on the western flank, while the eastern flank features lava domes from this stage, one of which has a "pancake"-like appearance. Two alignments of domes date back to this time, one on the southern and the other on the eastern flank, both lined up north-south. The second and probably also the third stage were subject to glacial erosion, which together with later sector collapses resulted in the removal of much of Taapaca's edifice and the exposure of the core of the volcano.

The fourth stage spans the Pleistocene and Holocene and commenced with the emplacement of the Churilinco debris avalanche, which covers a surface of 1 square kilometre (0.39 sq mi). This avalanche was formed by the collapse of the older edifice between 450,000 and 430,000 years ago; most likely the collapse took place after hydrothermal alteration had weakened the edifice. The Tajane unit was emplaced between 430,000–25,000 years ago on the south-southwestern slopes, covering an area of 30 square kilometres (12 sq mi). It consists of thick lava flows, some lava domes on the western flank, a debris avalanche on the southern flank and two fans of pyroclastic flows on the southern and southwestern flank. Between 25,000 and 9,000 years ago the Socapave unit was emplaced; it consists of more lava domes on the western margin of Taapaca and another debris avalanche, which cuts into these domes. This avalanche covers an area of 20 square kilometres (7.7 sq mi) to a distance of 10 kilometres (6.2 mi) and was apparently hot when it was emplaced. This collapse was triggered by the development of a cryptodome inside the volcano, a frequent occurrence at Taapaca. Putre is constructed on the avalanche deposit as well as on Tajane, Socapave and Holocene pyroclastic flows. A pyroclastic eruption occurred, filling in gaps in the Socapave debris avalanche deposit and emplacing more material atop the southern fan of the Tajane unit.

While Taapaca was once considered an extinct volcano, further research has identified eruptions during the Holocene. These gave rise to the Putre unit on the southern, central and southwestern slopes of the volcano. It consists of large lava domes on the eastern side of Taapaca, smaller domes on the southern side, and a pyroclastic sequence on the southern and southwestern slopes. This sequence consists of numerous block and ash flows along with blast deposits, which contain blocks and ash. The Putre unit also encompasses a pumice flow, lahars and layers of tephra. At least three pyroclastic eruptions occurred within the last 8,000 years, while tephra falls took place between 7,000 and 2,000 years ago, possibly linked to the eruption of lava domes. The Global Volcanism Program lists eight separate eruptions of Taapaca during the Holocene, with the last eruption occurring 2,300 years ago around 320 BCE ± 50 years. Taapaca was reported in the early 20th century to be fumarolically active, but there are no recorded historical eruptions and present day activity is reflected only by hot springs.

== Threats and preparedness ==
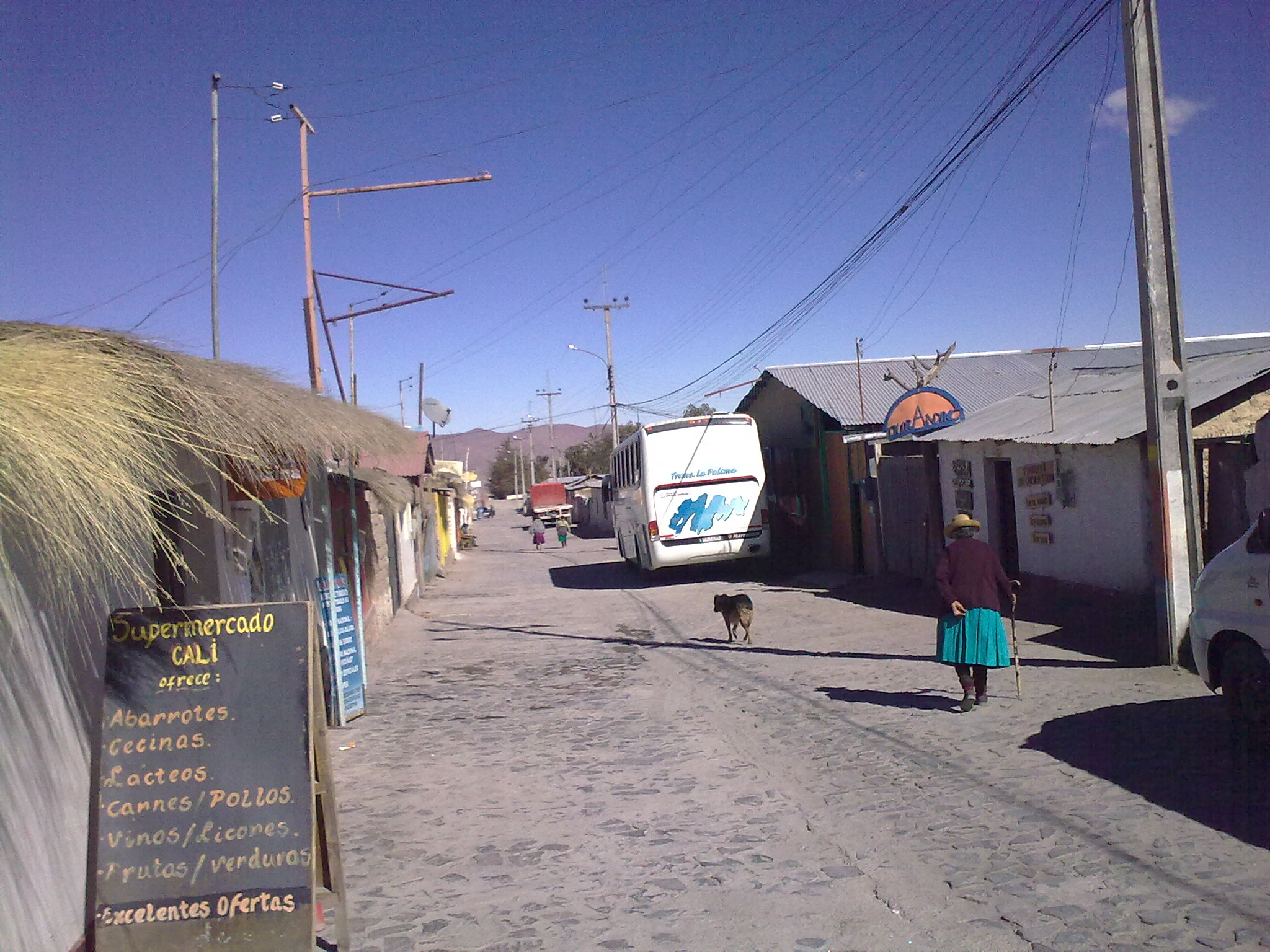
View down a road in Putre

Most of the volcanoes in northern Chile are far from towns and inhabited areas and thus their activity does not create significant human hazards, but Taapaca is an exception: Putre, the major local population centre, is constructed on pyroclastic deposits from Taapaca, facing a threat from future eruptions. A highway (Chile Route 11 between La Paz and Arica) linking Bolivia with the Pacific Ocean is also in range on the southern flank, while the road to Visviri in Peru runs along the southwestern and western flanks. Additional areas within range of Taapaca are the towns of Socoroma, Tiacolpa and Zapahuira, as well as the Oruro Department in Bolivia. The danger is accentuated by the fact that Holocene activity has affected mainly the southwestern flank, where Putre is located. The average time between eruptions at Taapaca is about 450 years.

Future activity at Taapaca could result in further sector collapses when magma is injected into the edifice and deforms it, to the point that the volcano becomes unstable. Likewise, if lava domes are extruded onto the volcano they could generate block and ash flows as well as both primary and secondary pyroclastic flows. Eruptions between April and November (when the volcano is covered by snow) might generate lahars, as could rainfall during the wet season between December and March; the latter type of lahar happens frequently on present-day Taapaca owing to the steep slopes of the volcano, although it usually results solely in road damage.

The Chilean SERNAGEOMIN geological service shows a volcano hazard level for the volcano, and collects and publishes monitoring data. SERNAGEOMIN also publishes a hazard map for Taapaca, which shows risk areas for lava bomb falls, pyroclastic flows and tephra fallout. It is classified as Chile's 42th most dangerous volcano.

== Religion and mining ==
Mountain worship is to this day practiced by Andean people. Climbers in 2002 discovered a figurine made of seashell on Taapaca's summit: such figurines were very important to the Incan people for rain rituals. The figurine was encountered within an outline made of rocks; further Inkan ruins were discovered 200 metres (660 ft) away from the summit on the northwest ridge. The figurine was probably emplaced to obtain a supply of water, since the Inkans believed that mountains controlled weather and thus the fertility of animals and plants. Taapaca was an Inkan mountain sanctuary, and the mountain is still said to protect the community of Putre.

Taapaca has deposits of sulfur in its summit area. Starting in the 1930s the Empresa Azufrera Taapaca ("Taapaca Sulfur Company") active in Putre mined this sulfur on Taapaca, and Taapaca's crater became the site of the Cánepa and Cía mining camp. This mining activity employed a significant number of the people in Putre.

== See also ==
- List of volcanoes in Chile
- Tacora
