= K'isi K'isini =

Mountain in Bolivia

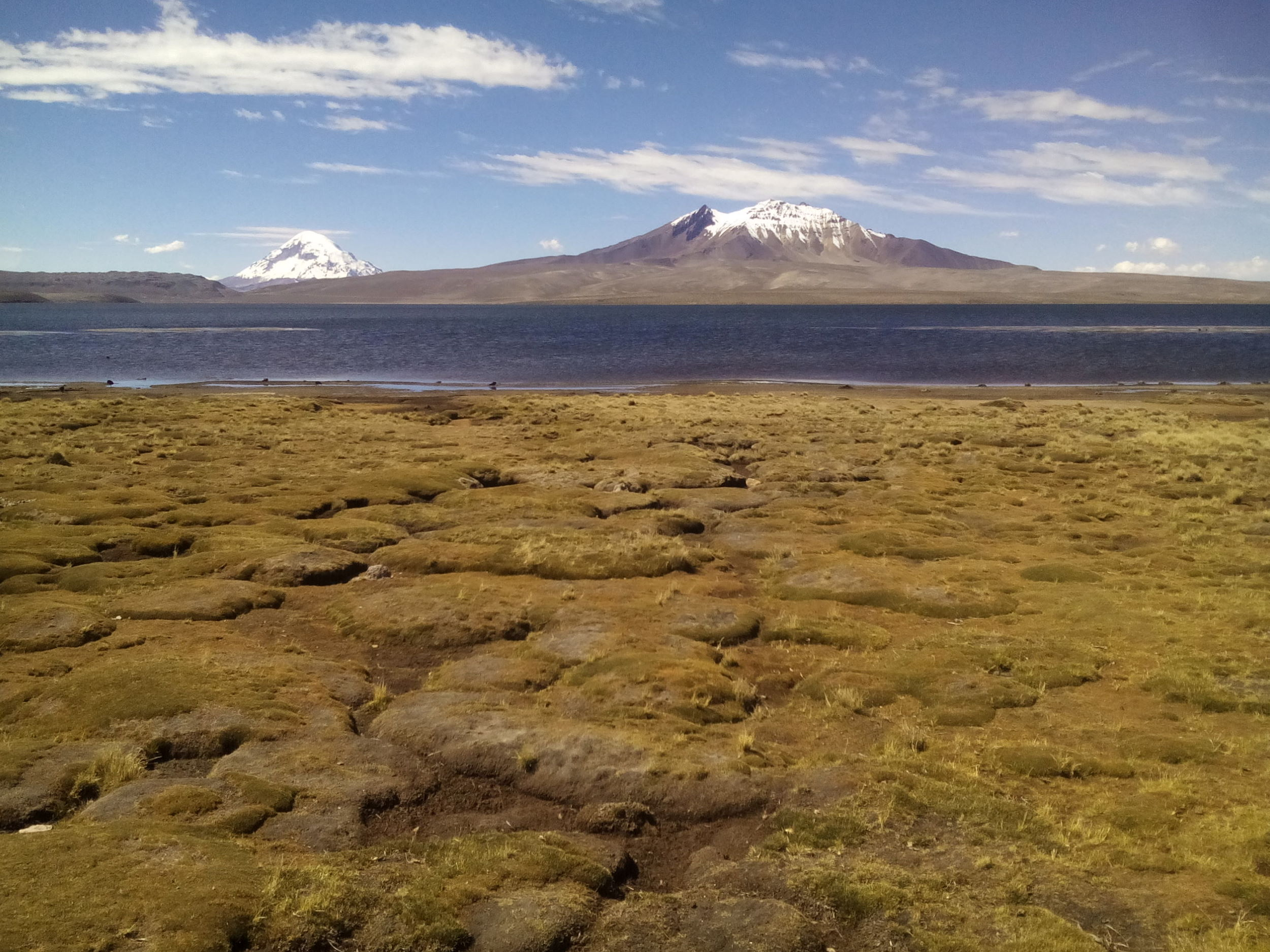
- K'isi K'isini as seen from Lake Chungara in Chile

Highest point
- Elevation: 5,536 m (18,163 ft)
- Coordinates: 18°14′20″S 69°03′52″W

Geography
- Location within Bolivia
- Location: Bolivia, Oruro Department, Sajama Province, Curahuara de Carangas Municipality
- Parent range: Andes, Cordillera Occidental

K'isi K'isini (Aymara and Quechua expression, k'isi a stipa variety, the reduplication signifies there is a group or complex of something, the Aymara suffix -ni indicates ownership, "the one with a group of stipa", Hispanicized spelling Quisi Quisini) is a 5,536-metre-high (18,163 ft) mountain in the Cordillera Occidental in the Andes of Bolivia. It is located in the Oruro Department, Sajama Province, Curahuara de Carangas Municipality, Sajama Canton. K'isi K'isini is situated inside the boundaries of the Sajama National Park, south-east of the Parina Quta and Pomerape volcanoes and north of the Bolivian route 4 that leads to the Chungara–Tambo Quemado mountain pass on the border with Chile.

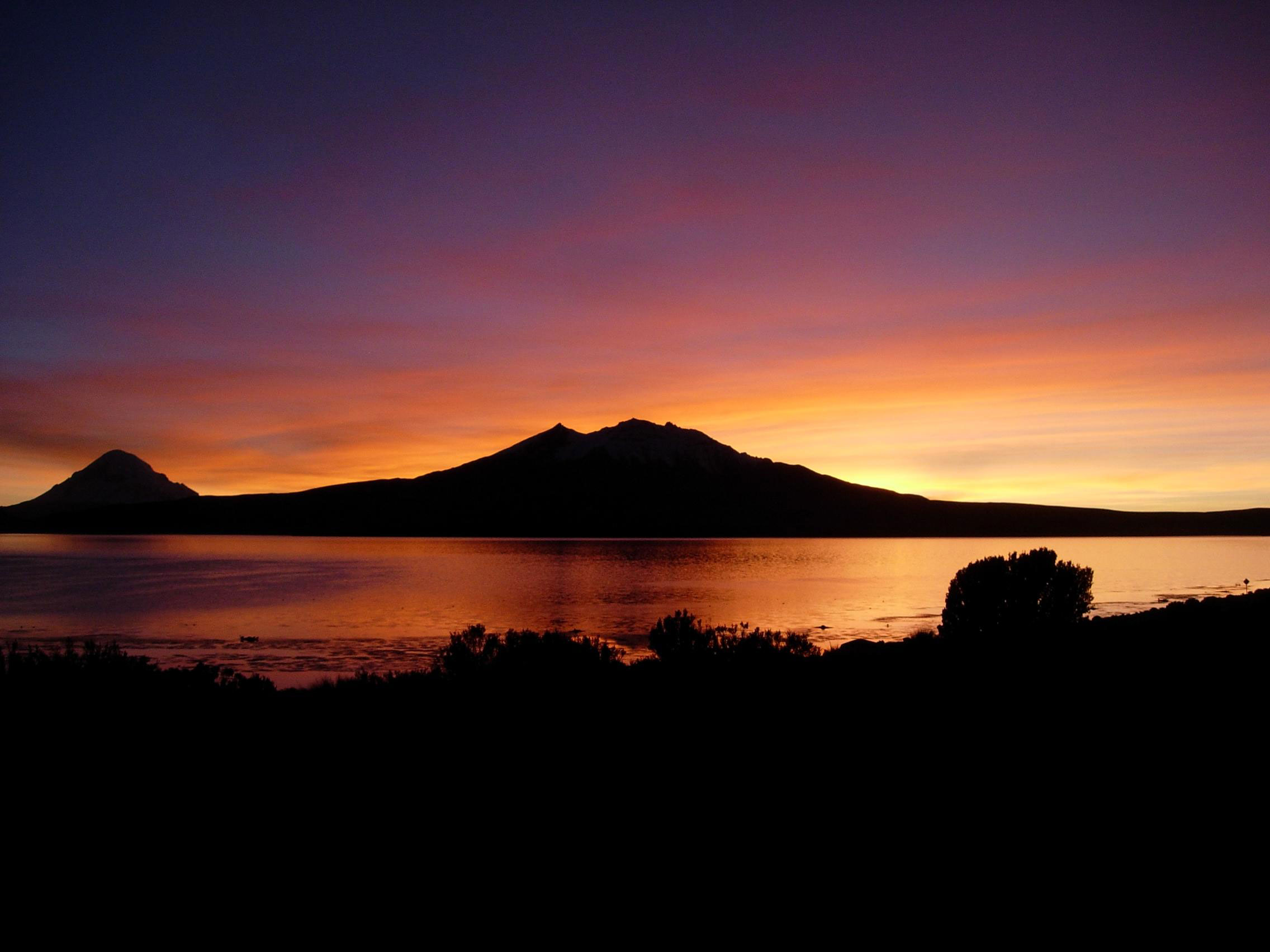
K'isi K'isini and Lake Chungara as seen from Lauca National Park

== See also ==
- Acotango
- Lake Chungara
- Sajama
- Wallatiri
- List of mountains in the Andes
