= Cotacotani Lake =

Lake in Parinacota Province, Chile

Cotacotani Quta Qutani
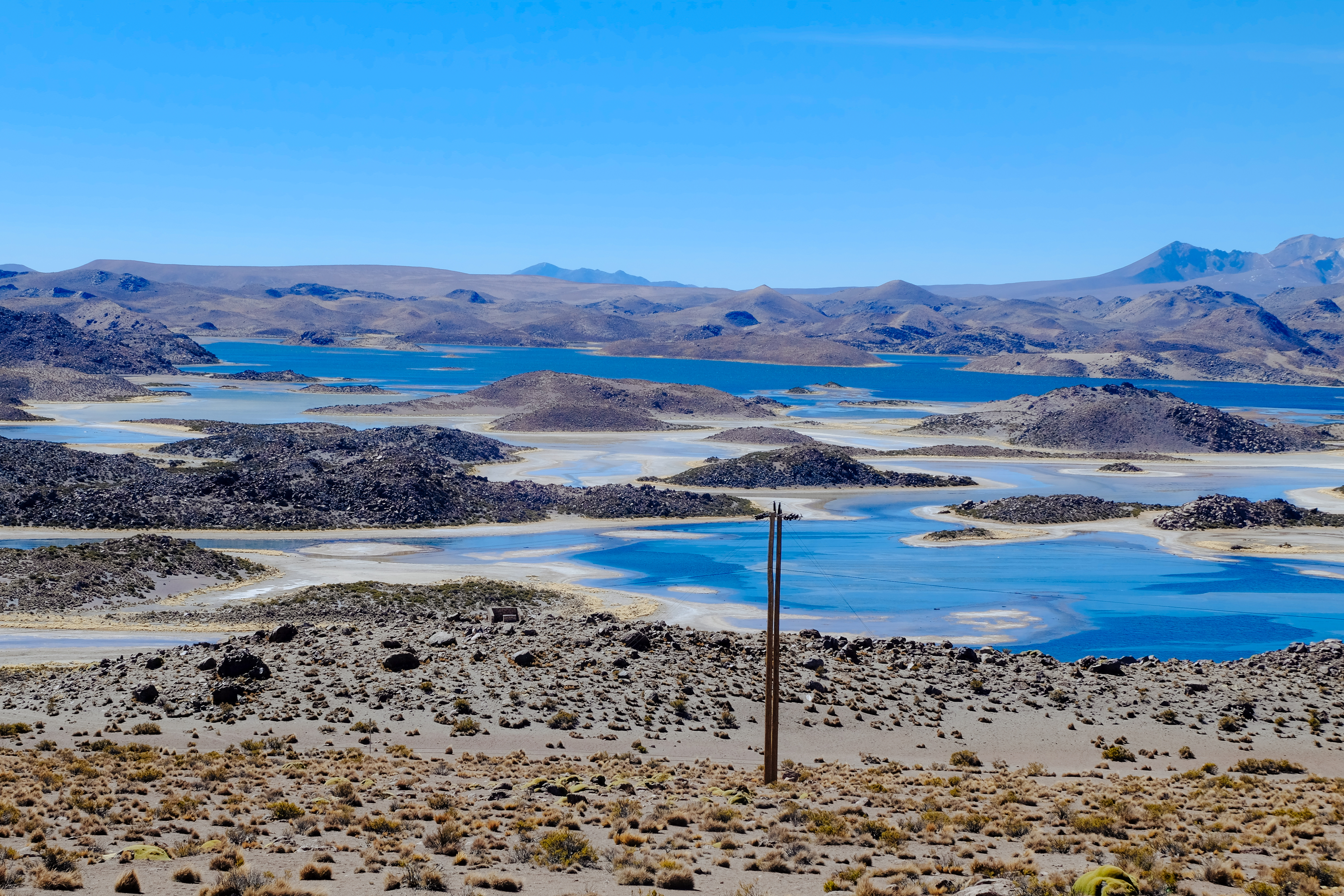

- Location within Chile

- Location: Arica-Parinacota Region
- Coordinates: 18°11′S 69°13′W
- Primary inflows: Benedicto Morales River, El Encuentro Creek
- Primary outflows: Desaguadero River
- Catchment area: 119 km^{2} (46 sq mi)
- Basin countries: Chile
- Surface area: 6 km^{2} (2.3 sq mi)
- Max. depth: 10 m (33 ft)
- Surface elevation: 4,495 m (14,747 ft)

Laguna de Cotacotani (Hispanicized expression) or Quta Qutani (Aymara quta lake, the reduplication signifies there is a group or complex of something, -ni is a suffix to indicate ownership, "the one with a group of lakes") is a lake located in the Andean Altiplano of the Parinacota Province, Arica-Parinacota Region, Chile. It lies 4 km northwest of Chungará Lake, which is one of the highest lakes in the world and is surrounded by several volcanoes, such as the Payachata volcanic group (Parinacota and Pomerape), Sajama volcano and Wallatiri.

Cotacotani is separated from the lake Chungará by a strip of volcanic rock and receives groundwater inflow from that lake, however its major sources are Benedicto Morales River and El Encuentro Creek. Cotacotani Lake's main feature is the considerable number of islands and islets that it holds, which are really lava hummocks generated by a past volcanic event. With a surface of 6 km^{2}, the Cotacotani holds a volume of water between 30 and 40 million of m³, which empty through Lauca River into Coipasa Lake, in Bolivia.

Although much of its present hummocky topography is related to a large volcanic debris avalanche occurred in the zone, this lacustrine area was not originated by such event. Recent investigations suggests that Cotacotani originated as a series of kettle hole ponds.

Cotacotani lies close to the Route CH-11 which connects Arica and La Paz via Tambo Quemado International Pass. The lake is located about 54 km east of Putre and 9 km west of the border with Bolivia, within Lauca National Park.

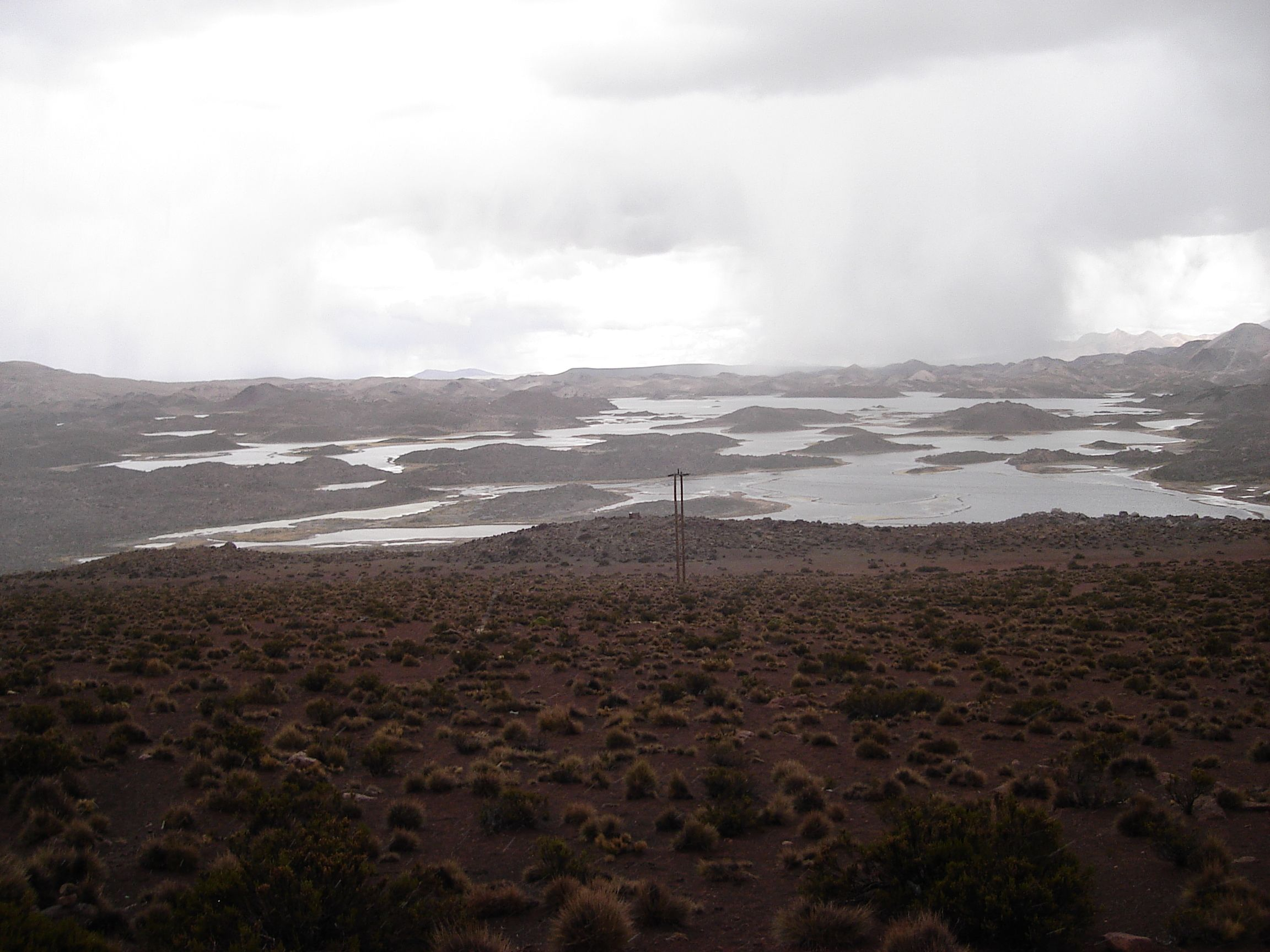
Bad weather

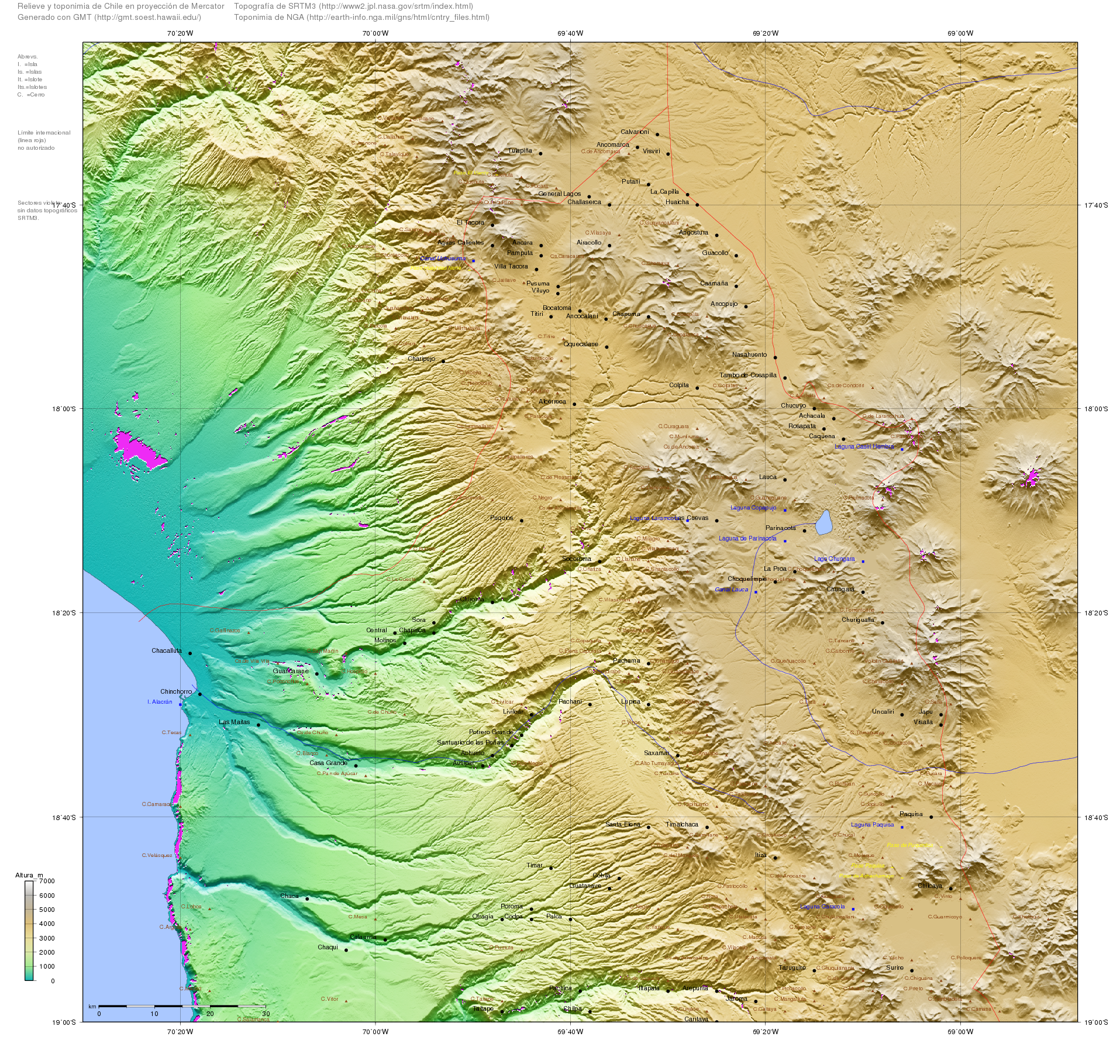
Topographic map of the Arica and Parinacota Region

Cotacotani Lake lies in the Tarapaca Region of Chile and within the Lauca National Park. The region has been volcanically active since the Miocene, the volcanoes Guane Guane, Parinacota and Ajoya rise northwest, northeast and south of the lake. Of these Parinacota has been recently active and deposits from a huge landslide are found on its southwestern foot; Cotacotani Lake has formed on these deposits which are about 18,000 years before present old.

The lake is technically a compound structure consisting of many disconnected water bodies with an average surface elevation of 4,526 metres (14,849 ft) between rocky blocks of andesite and rhyolite that were formed by the Parinacota huge landslide. The largest water body has a surface area that fluctuates between 5.2–4.1 square kilometres (2.0–1.6 sq mi) and a maximum depth of 20 metres (66 ft); some of the water bodies merge during lake level highstands. The volume of the lake is about 30,000,000 cubic metres (1.1×10^{9} cu ft) and its waters are fresh.

The Benedicto Morales River is the principal tributary and is fed by springs on the foot of Parinacota, another tributary is called El Encuentro in addition to groundwater inflow from Lake Chungara. The Cotacotani Lakes also have an outlet in a wetland that in turn gives rise to the Lauca River. There have been projects in the past to pump water from Lake Chungara into the Cotacotani Lakes which are active since 1983 but were then halted by a ruling of the Supreme Court of Chile in 1985.

Precipitation at Lake Chungara close to Cotacotani is about 331 millimetres per year (13.0 in/year) owing to the effects of the Southeast Pacific High and the rain shadow of the Andes and occurs mainly during December–March in the so-called "Bolivian Winter" when Atlantic moisture arrives. The average temperature is about 1 °C (34 °F) but varies greatly by hour and season.

Vegetation consists of wetlands, tussock, shrubs and Polylepis trees. Orestias fish and Biomphalaria snails live in the waters of Cotacotani Lake.

== See also ==
- Laram Q'awa
