= Laram Q'awa (Parinacota) =

Mountain in Chile

- Location within Chile

Highest point
- Elevation: 5,439 m (17,844 ft)
- Coordinates: 18°7′S 69°22′W

Geography
- Location: Chile
- Parent range: Andes

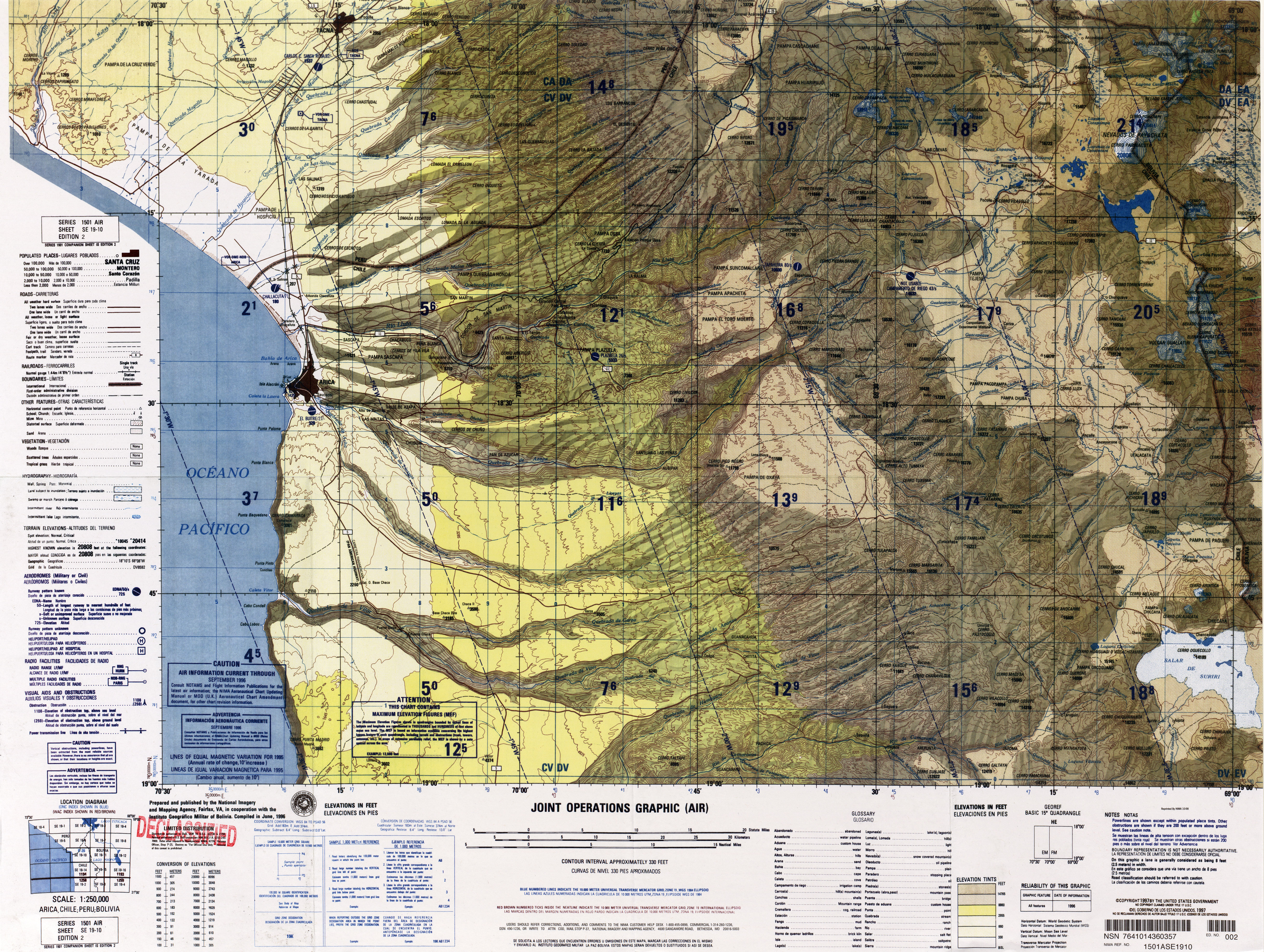
Map showing Laram Q'awa (Larancagua) in Chile between the Taapaca volcanic complex and Payachata mountains

Laram Q'awa (Aymara larama blue, q'awa little river, "little blue river" hispanicized spellings Larancagua, Larancahua) is a mountain in Chile situated in the Parinacota Province of the Arica and Parinacota Region, about 5,439 metres (17,845 ft) high. It lies between the Taapaca volcanic complex and the Payachata mountains.

== See also ==
- Quta Qutani lakes
