= Chungará Lake =

Lake in Lauca National Park, Chile

- Chungara
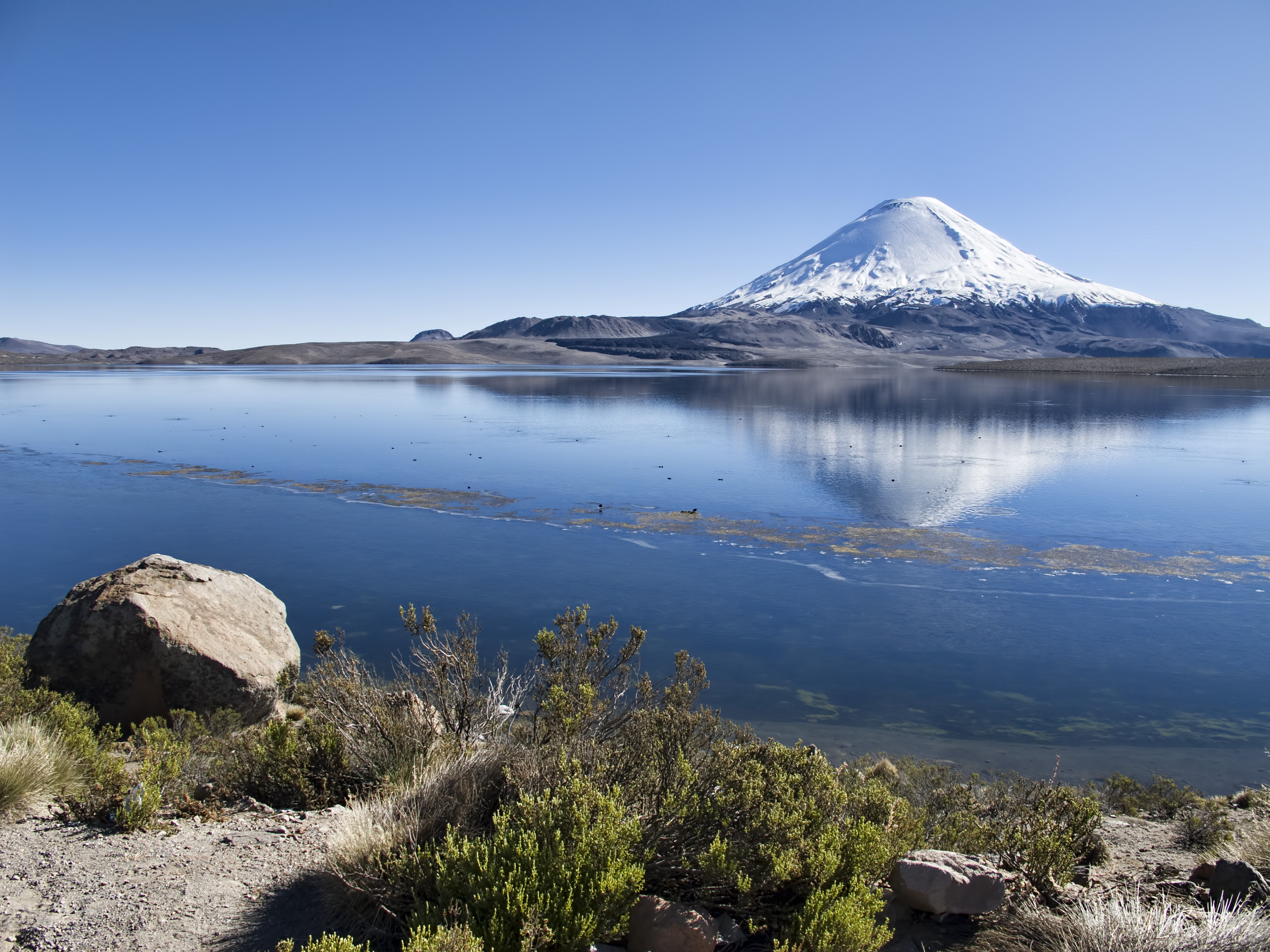
- The volcano Parinacota rises over Chungará

- Location within Chile
- Coordinates: 18°14′S 69°09′W
- Primary inflows: Chiefly Río Chungara
- Primary outflows: Evaporation and seepage
- Catchment area: 260 square kilometres (100 sq mi)
- Max. length: 8.75 kilometres (5.44 mi)
- Surface area: 21.5–22.5 square kilometres (8.3–8.7 sq mi)
- Max. depth: 26–40 metres (85–131 ft)
- Surface elevation: 4,517 metres (14,820 ft)

Chungará is a lake situated in the extreme north of Chile at an elevation of 4,517 metres (14,820 ft), in the Altiplano of Arica y Parinacota Region in the Lauca National Park. It has a surface area of about 21.5–22.5 square kilometres (8.3–8.7 sq mi) and has a maximum depth of about 26–40 metres (85–131 ft). It receives inflow through the Río Chungara with some minor additional inflows, and loses most of its water to evaporation; seepage into the Laguna Quta Qutani plays a minor role.

The lake formed between 8,000 and 17,000 years ago when the volcano Parinacota collapsed and the debris from the collapse dammed the Lauca River. Since then the lake has progressively grown owing to decreasing seepage. The lake is part of the Lauca National Park; a planned diversion of the lake's waters into the Azapa Valley being abandoned after a decision by the Chilean Supreme Court.

== Name ==
The name Chungará or Chungara is derived from the Aymara language and has several different meanings: Chunka, a type of bush or moss plus the suffix ra that signifies "covered by"; but this meaning appears to have fallen into disuse. A second meaning is Chunkha "beard" which together with the suffix means "bearded" and refers to a myth of a bearded man that came to the area and destroyed a community with fire.

== Geography ==
Chungará Lake is located in the northernmost part of Chile and close to the border with Bolivia. It lies at an elevation of 4,517 metres (14,820 ft) in the Chilean Altiplano; it is one of the highest lakes in the world and the second highest-largest after Lake Titicaca in the Altiplano. The lake is part of the Lauca National Park, a nationally and internationally designated protected area, and a CONAF refuge lies close to the western shores of the lake. There is also a marina and a pumping plant in the northwestern area of Chungará Lake. Chile Route 11 passes by the southern and western shores of Chungará Lake.

The lake is about 8.75 kilometres (5.44 mi) wide and covers an irregular surface of about 21.5 square kilometres (8.3 sq mi)-22.5 square kilometres (8.7 sq mi), with two large embayments in the northeastern and the southern sectors of the lake and a narrower one in its northwestern corner. Its deepest point is 26 metres (85 ft)-40 metres (130 ft) deep and lies in the northwestern sector of the lake. The northern and western side of the lake have steep shores, while the southern and eastern ones are much more gentle; the eastern shore is covered by a large alluvial fan and the southern one by sediments deposited by the Río Chungara tributary. The lake floor features platforms, flat areas and sloping areas. 4 kilometres (2.5 mi) northwest from Chungará Lake lies the Lagunas Cotacotani.

The volcanoes Parinacota (6,342 metres (20,807 ft)) of Pliocene to Holocene age and Ajoya (5,293 metres (17,365 ft)) of Miocene age lie north and west of the lake, respectively; the northern shore of the lake is formed by lava flows from Parinacota volcano. While Parinacota is well preserved, Ajoya and Quisiquisini (5,516 metres (18,097 ft)) on the eastern shore of the lake are moderately eroded. Farther south from Chungará Lake lies the 6,063 metres (19,892 ft) high Guallatiri.

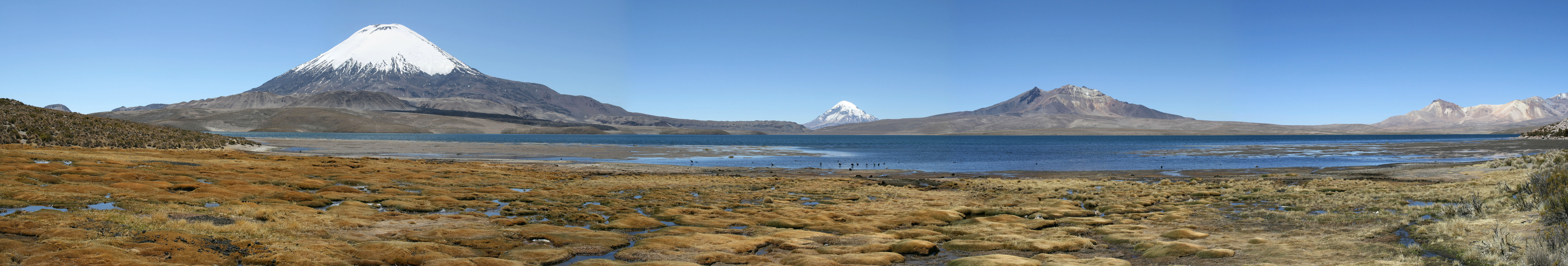
Panorama of Chungará Lake

== Hydrology ==
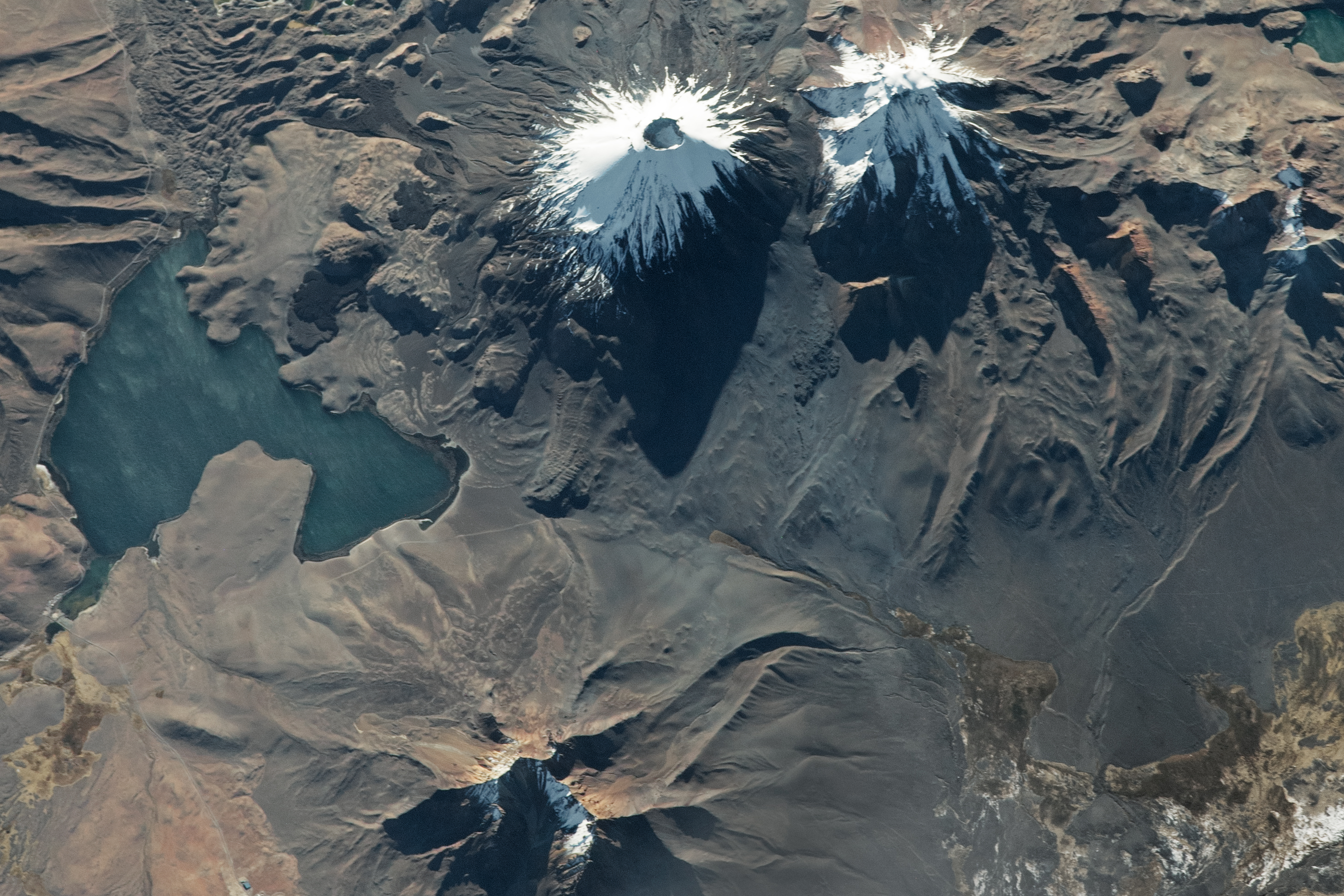
Chungara Lake and Parinacota and Pomerape volcanoes as seen from the ISS. June 2023.

The water temperature reaches its maximum during March with 13.5 °C (56.3 °F) and a minimum in January with 3.5 °C (38.3 °F) according to one study, while temperatures on the lake floor range between 6.4–6.2 °C (43.5–43.2 °F). Water levels vary by 0.5 metres (1 ft 8 in) between seasons and fluctuations of 3–2 metres (9.8–6.6 ft) have been recorded.

The present-day water levels are the highest in the history of the lake and there is no evidence of former lake highstands, and the depth of the lake has generally increased during the course of its history. There are some long-term fluctuations in water levels, including a deepening episode during the latest Pleistocene and three or four episodes of water level lowstand during the middle and late Holocene at about 10,500, 9,800, 7,800 and 6,700 calibrated radiocarbon years ago. Since about 5,000 calibrated radiocarbon years ago lake levels have been high.

The Lake Chungará is part of a 260 square kilometres (100 sq mi) large high-elevation watershed in the Altiplano, bordered on the west by the Lauca River watershed and on the east by the Bolivian frontier; the watershed is surrounded by snow-covered volcanoes. The largest tributary of the lake is the Río Chungara with a discharge of about 0.3–0.46 cubic metres per second (11–16 cu ft/s) which originates on Guallatiri volcano and drains the area of the Nevados de Quimsachata (Acotango, Capurata and Umurata); this river contributes about 4/5 of the water to the lake and enters Chungará Lake on its southeastern corner through a river delta. Other tributaries are the Chachapay, Mal Paso (15 litres per second (0.53 cu ft/s)), Ajata (20 litres per second (0.71 cu ft/s)) and Sopocalane (30–160 litres per second (1.1–5.7 cu ft/s) only during wet periods) creeks which originate on Choquelimpie/Ajoya volcano, which have formed river deltas where they enter the lake; some of the deltas are submerged. In addition, springs supply water into the lake from its western and northern shores where volcanoes border the lake. There are no inflows on the eastern side of Chungará Lake.

Chungará Lake has no outlet; its waters evaporate at a rate of about 1.2 millimetres per year (0.047 in/year) and also seep into the groundwater table at a rate of 0.2 cubic metres per second (7.1 cu ft/s). The water chemistry of the Cotacotani Lakes imply that they receive water from Chungará Lake at a rate of about 0.25 cubic metres per second (8.8 cu ft/s); this constitutes over half of the inflow to the Cotacotani Lakes. The role of this underground outflow has progressively decreased through the history of the lake as silt has accumulated in the breccia through which the groundwater seeps out. The Cotacotani Lakes eventually drain into the Lauca River.

The total volume of the lake is about 0.426 cubic kilometres (0.102 cu mi). Chungará Lake is polymictic/well mixed and its waters transparent enough that sunlight can reach most of the lake floor. The waters of the lake are slightly alkaline and saline and show influence of dolomite rocks. This lake chemistry is homogeneous throughout the lake and the lake waters are subject to strong currents at the surface.

== Geology ==
The lake was formed by volcanic-tectonic phenomena; specifically, a major collapse of the Parinacota volcano dammed a former Rio Lauca, forming Chungará Lake, at some time between 8,000 and 15,000 - 17,000 years ago. This collapse involved about 6 cubic kilometres (1.4 cu mi) and covered about 140 square kilometres (54 sq mi) with debris; before the collapse took place the lake floor of Chungará Lake consisted of alluvial and river sediments left by the Rio Lauca which drained the area. Upon damming, water from the river accumulated and formed Chungará Lake. The exact time of the collapse is controversial. Faulting also played a minor role in the formation of the lake basin, with a southwest–northeast trending fault disrupting sediments in the northwestern sector of the lake. Since the birth of Chungará Lake, about 10 metres (33 ft) of sediment have accumulated on its floor.

Volcanism in the area has been ongoing since the Paleozoic and has continued until recent times, which has influenced Chungará Lake. A number of volcanoes such as Parinacota, Ajoya and Quisiquisini grew on a Miocene ignimbrite basement that crops out east of the lake; of these only Parinacota and an unknown volcano that erupted in AD 400-720 have been active in the Holocene, depositing tephra within the lake.

== Climate ==
Temperatures at the lake average 4.2 °C (39.6 °F), fluctuating between 20–12 °C (68–54 °F) at day and 3 – −10 °C (37–14 °F) at night. The climate of Chungará Lake is arid and annual precipitation on Chungará Lake amounts to about 330 millimetres per year (13 in/year), considerably smaller than the evaporation rate. This precipitation occurs during summer when moisture is transported into the region from the Amazon and the Atlantic Ocean; this is known as the "Bolivian Winter". Annual precipitation varies under the influence of the "ENSO" phenomenon. In addition, the area is characterized by a high solar insolation.

== Human use ==
The area of the lake is inhabited by Aymara people who engage in animal husbandry, using alpacas, cattle, llamas and sheep and live on farms and pastoral refuges.

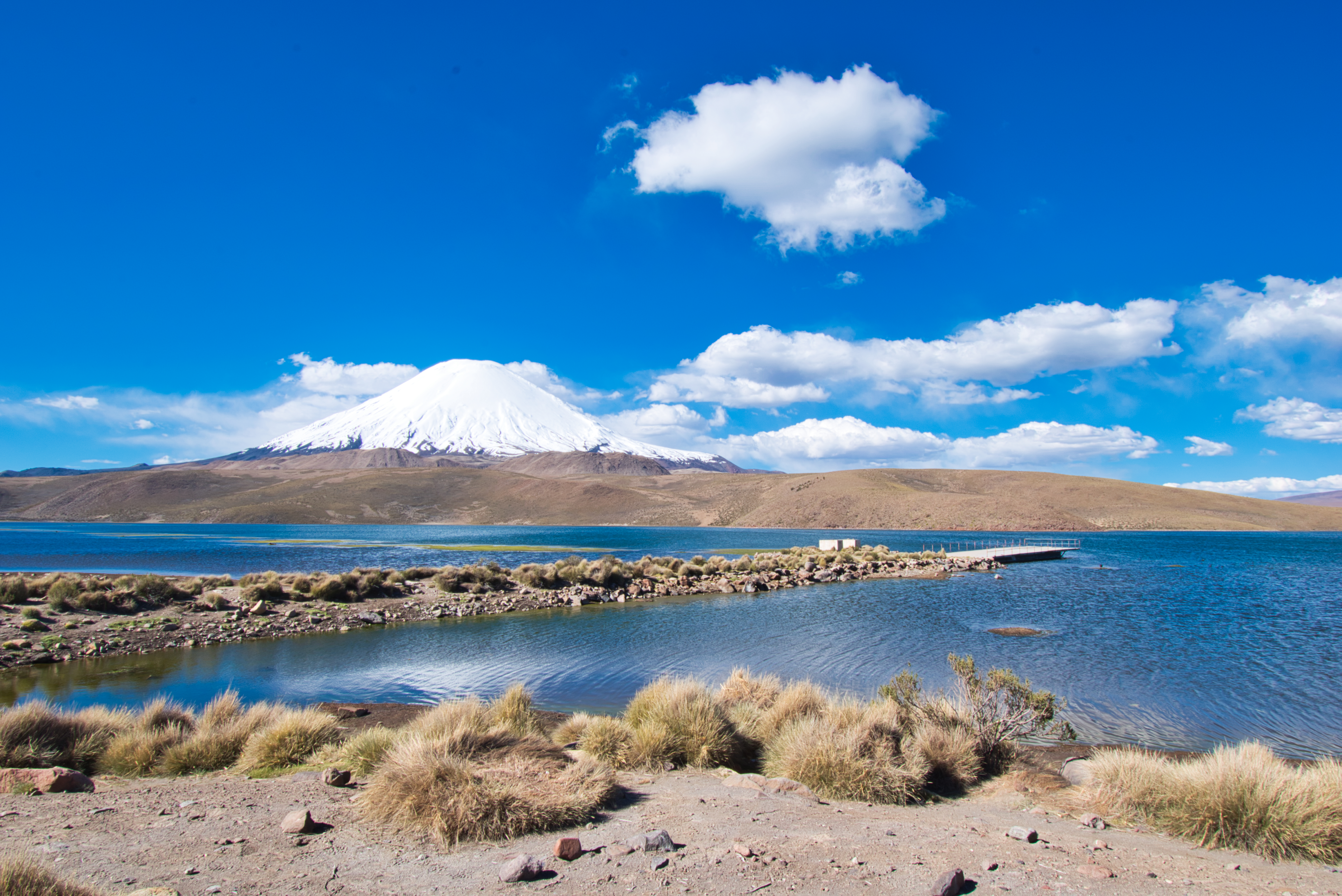
The marina of Chungará Lake

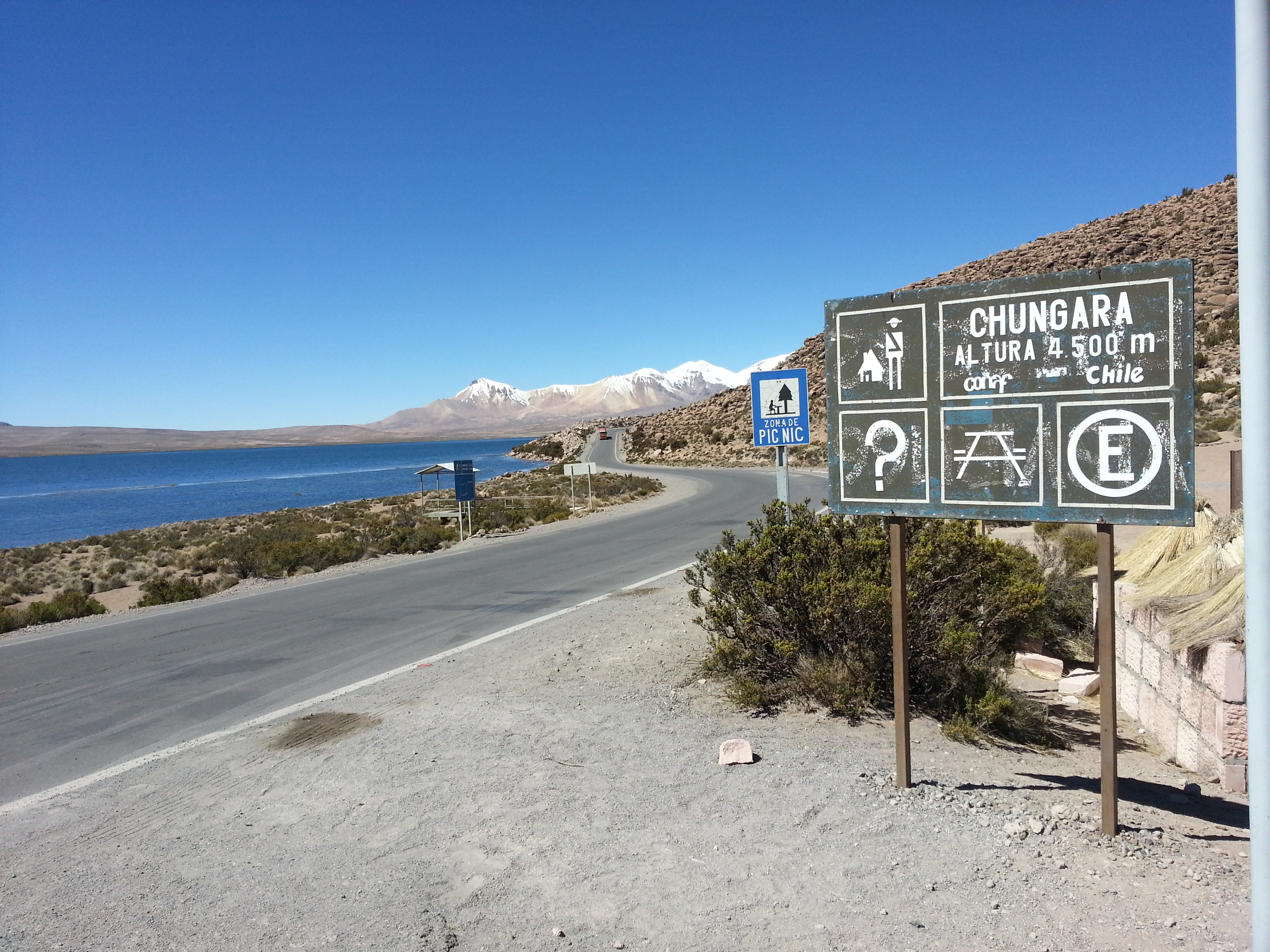
Road and roadsign on Chungará Lake

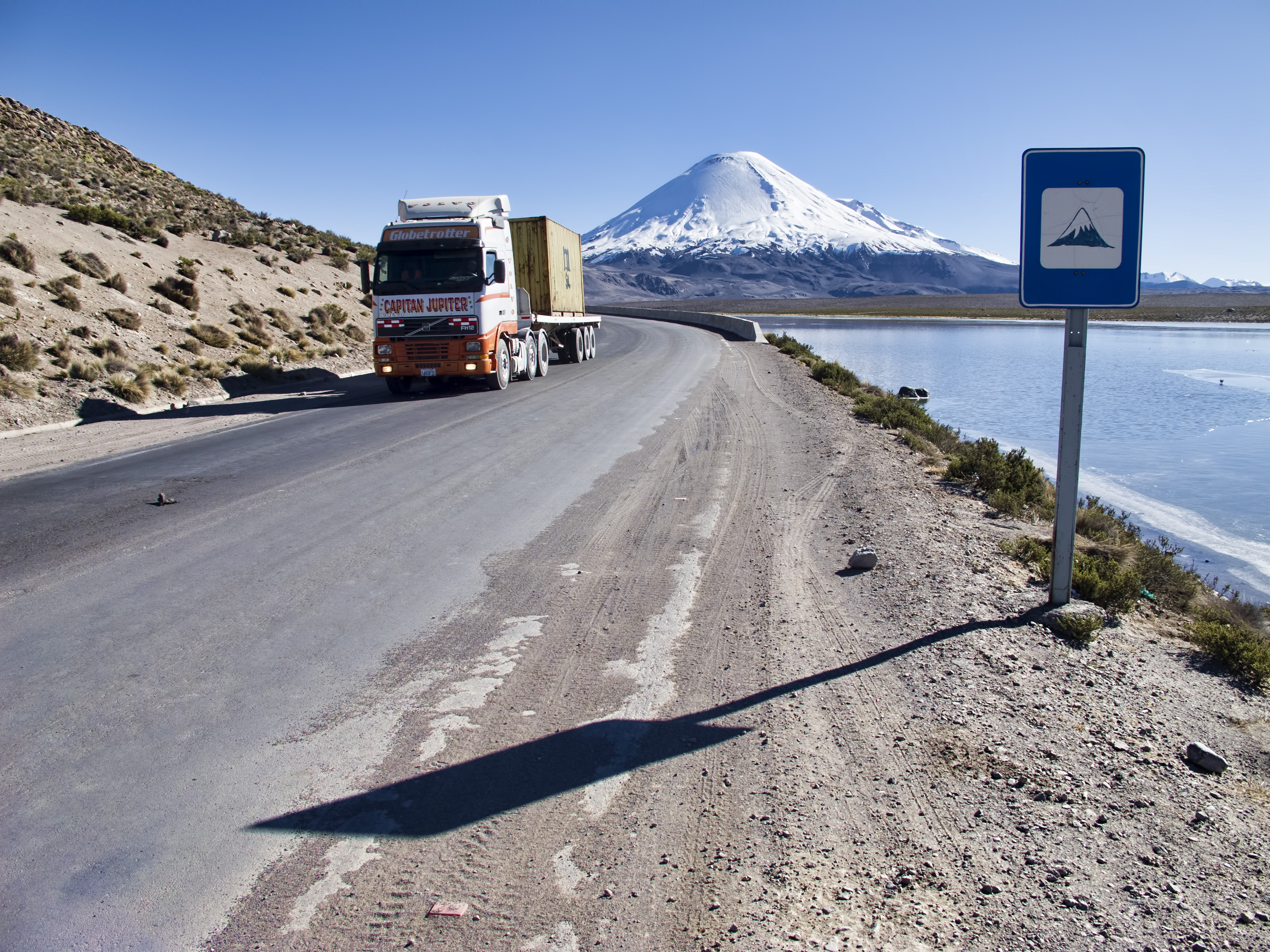
Road on Chungará Lake

=== Environmental issues ===
In the 1970s water was pumped from Chungará Lake to the Azapa Valley to allow for irrigation, but quickly ceased when water levels dropped and the flora and fauna of the lake were damaged. For this purpose, the Canal Chungará was built by the Chilean Ministry of Public Works to transfer water into the Laguna Cotacotani which is the headwater of the Lauca-Azapa system.

This project was opposed by environmentalists. On 19 December 1985 the lake was the subject of a major legal case when the Chilean Supreme Court ruled that international obligations such as the CITES need to be considered by the Chilean government and prohibited the use of the waters of Chungará Lake; the ruling by disallowing the use of the waters of Chungará Lake forced the Arica y Parinacota Region to seek other sources of water for the growing economy.

Accumulation of rubbish in the area of Chungará Lake has become a major issue, as a lot of waste is discarded by for example drivers on the Chungara–Tambo Quemado road between Chile and Bolivia. The Chilean government has thus organized cleanup operations to remove some of the waste.

== Biology ==
The lake hosts a diverse plant and animal community. The landscape around the lake includes wetlands known as bofedales; otherwise the vegetation in the region of the lake consists mainly of Polylepis dwarf trees, shrubs and tussock grasses.

The shoreline vegetation draws birds in such as Andean gull, Chilean flamingo, crested duck, giant coot and Puna plover.

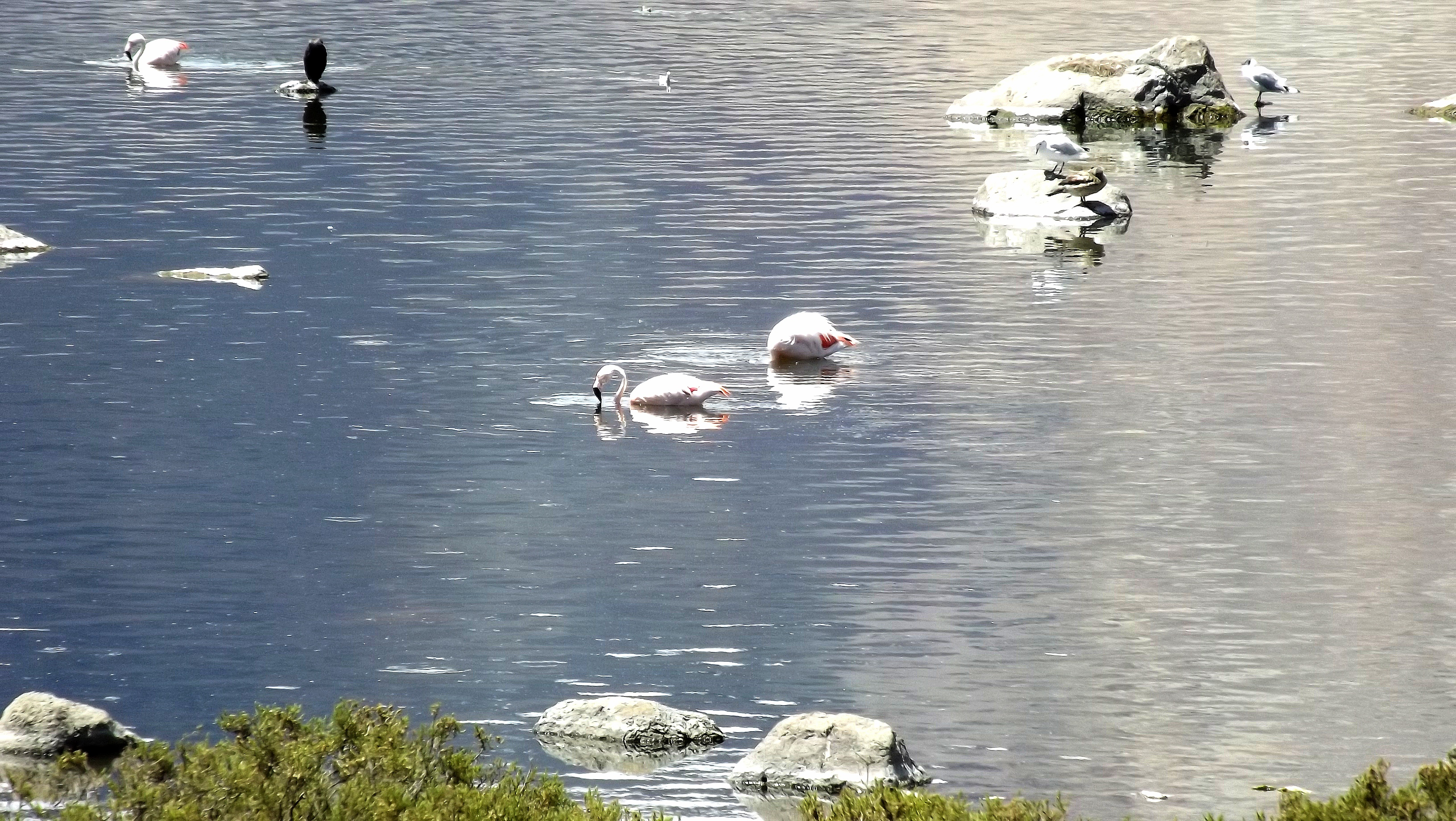
Birdlife, including Chilean flamingo, at Chungará Lake

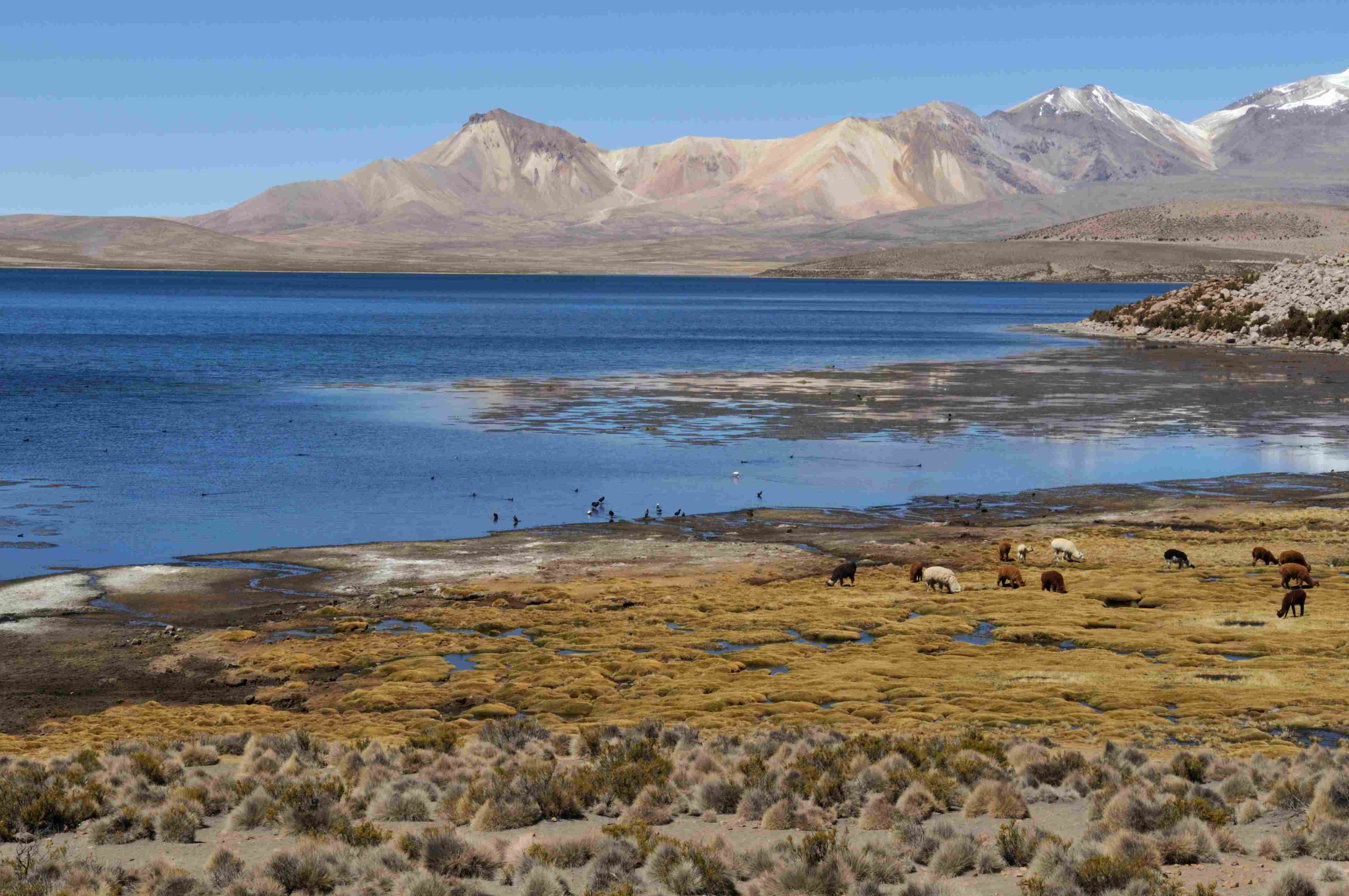
Shoreline vegetation and landscape

Aided by the highly transparent waters, large amounts of aquatic plants live in Chungará Lake and are particularly noticeable on the southern shores, where Myriophyllum elatinoides and Potamogeton filifolius occur. The shores are inhabited by amphibians such as Rhinella, Pleurodema and Telmatobius, and by molluscs and turbellaria such as Ancylus, Pisidium and Taphius.

The phytoplankton of the lake is dominated by diatoms in winter and by chlorophyceae in summer. Algae include both the large Cladophora and Nostoc genera and the small Botryococcus braunii, Cocconeis placentula, Cyclotella andina and Nephroclamys subsolitaria; the second and the third are diatoms. Copepods such as calanoids and cladocera make up the zooplankton, which is abundant in Lake Chungará. Microbial colonies occur on the shores of Chungará Lake.

=== Fish ===
The most important and only native fish in Chungará Lake are two endemics; the pupfish Orestias chungarensis and catfish Trichomycterus chungaraensis.

Orestias chungarensis of Chungará Lake is most closely related to other Orestias species in the Lauca National Park but also those found in Salar de Ascotan and Salar de Carcote. This reflects that these waterbodies and the Lauca River were once joined by the former Lake Tauca. The fish in Chungará lake show evidence of forming two distinct groups with different food procurement areas. In Chungará Lake these fish occur at elevations of over 4.5 kilometres (2.8 mi); Orestias is among the fish with the highest occurrences in the world. They are further considered to be threatened species by the International Union for Conservation of Nature and the Chilean National Museum of Natural History.

Beginning in the 1990s, the rainbow trout also lives in the lake and is considered an invasive species there as it feeds on the threatened Orestias fish; the Chilean government has thus envisaged to take measures to eradicate the fish from the lake.

== See also ==
- K'isi K'isini
