= Trichomycterus chungaraensis =

Conservation status
- Vulnerable (IUCN 2.3)

Scientific classification
- Kingdom: Animalia
- Phylum: Chordata
- Class: Actinopterygii
- Order: Siluriformes
- Family: Trichomycteridae
- Genus: Trichomycterus
- Species: T. chungaraensis

Binomial name
- Trichomycterus chungaraensis Arratia, 1983

Species of fish

Trichomycterus chungaraensis is a species of ray-finned fish belonging to the family Trichomycteridae, the pencil and parasitic catfishes. This catfish is endemic to Chile, where it is found in the streams around Lake Chungará. This species grows to a length of 12 centimetres (4.7 in).
