= Tarapacá (disambiguation) =

Tarapacá (Hispanicized spelling) or Tara Paka (Aymara for "two-headed eagle", Quechua for Andean eagle) may refer to:

- San Lorenzo de Tarapacá, a town in northern Chile
- Tarapacá Province, Chile, a former province, now divided into
  - Tarapacá Region
  - Arica-Parinacota Region
- Department of Tarapacá (Peru), a former province (1837–1878; 1878–1883) and department (1878–1883) of Peru
- Tarapacá, Amazonas, municipality in the Amazonas Department, Colombia
- Tara Paka or Qachini, a mountain in Peru
