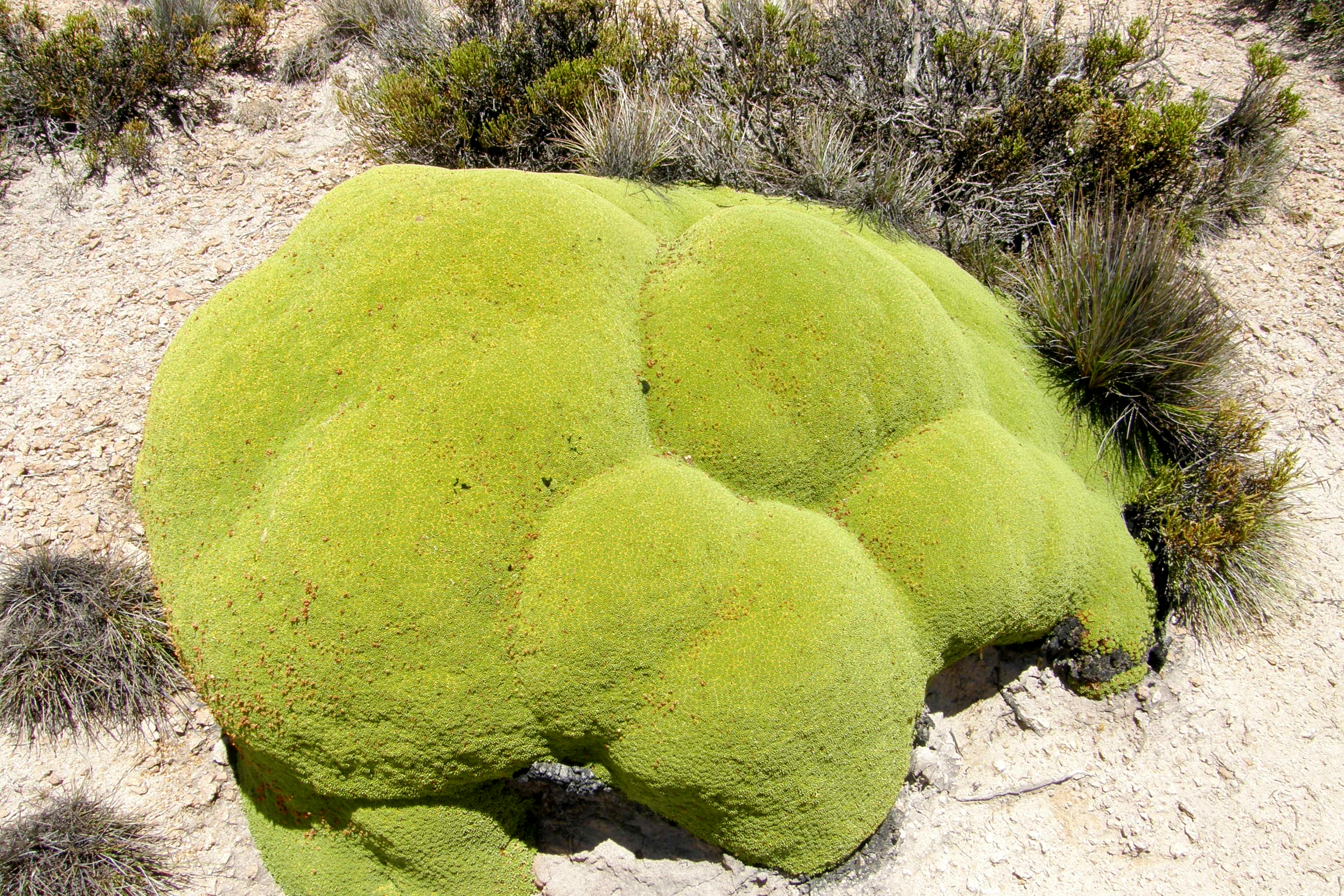
- in Lauca National Park, Chile

Scientific classification
- Kingdom: Plantae
- Clade: Tracheophytes
- Clade: Angiosperms
- Clade: Eudicots
- Clade: Asterids
- Order: Apiales
- Family: Apiaceae
- Genus: Azorella
- Species: A. compacta

Binomial name
- Azorella compacta Phil.

= Yareta =

Species of plant

Yareta or llareta (in Spanish), known scientifically as Azorella compacta (historically Azorella yareta), is a velvety, chartreuse cushion plant in the family Apiaceae which is native to South America. It grows in the Puna grasslands of the Andes in Peru, Bolivia, northern Chile and western Argentina at altitudes between 3,200 and 5,250 metres (10,500 and 17,220 ft).

The name comes from yarita in the Quechua language.

== Description ==
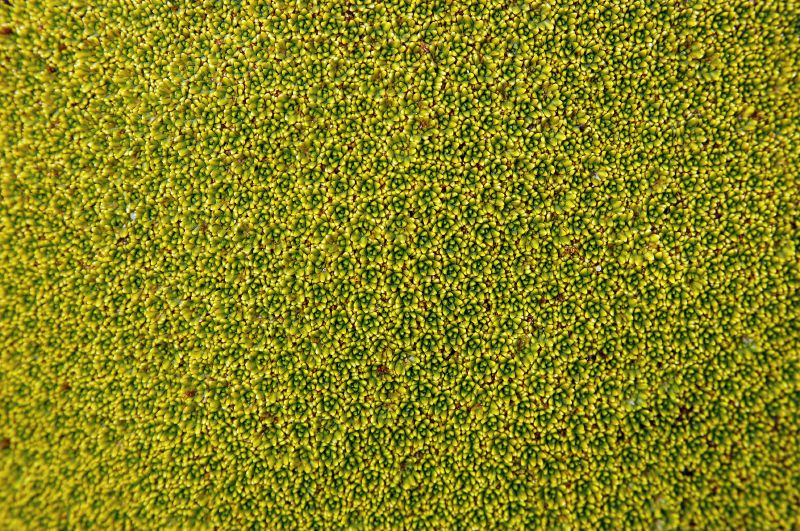
Distribution of flowers

Yareta is an evergreen perennial with a low, mat-like shape and hemispherical growth form that grows to around 6 m (20 ft) in diameter. The self-fertile, pink or lavender flowers are hermaphroditic and are primarily pollinated by small flies, bees, wasps, and moths.

The plant prefers sandy, well-drained soils. It can grow in nutritionally poor soils that are acidic, neutral or basic (alkaline) at altitudes of up to 5,200 metres (17,100 ft). Yareta is well-adapted to high insolation rates typical of the Andes highlands and cannot grow in shade. The plant's leaves grow into an extremely compact, dense mat that reduces heat and water loss. This mat grows near the ground where air temperature is one or two degrees Celsius higher than the mean air temperature. This temperature difference is a result of the longwave radiation re-radiated by the soil surface, which is usually dark gray to black in the Puna.

Yareta is estimated to grow approximately 1.5 centimetres (0.59 in) per year. Many yaretas are estimated to be over 3,000 years old. These oldest ones have been reported to grow as slowly as 1/18 inch (1.4 millimeters) per year. Its very slow growth makes the traditional practice of harvesting it for fuel highly unsustainable.

== Gallery ==
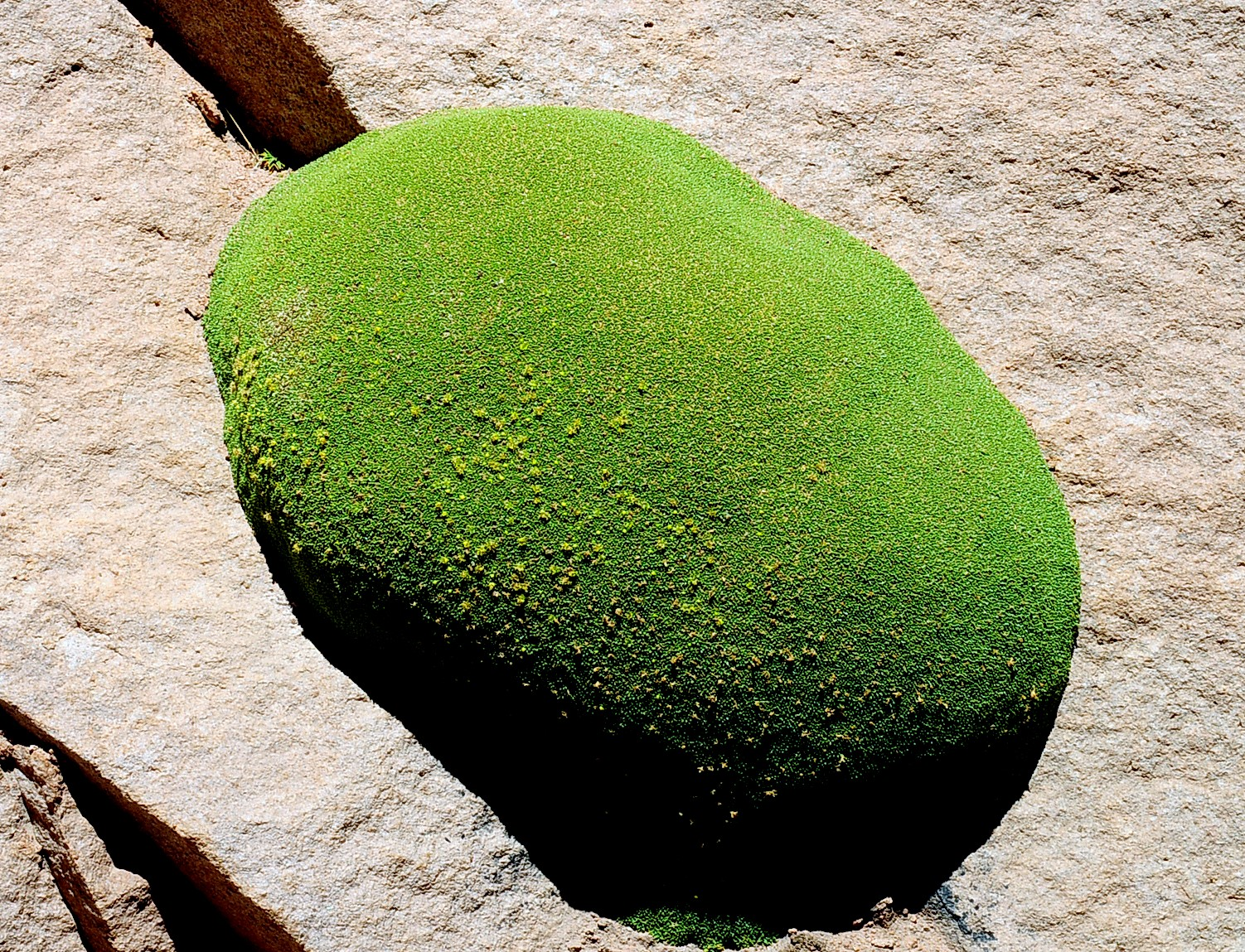
Plant in crevice in Eduardo Avaroa Andean Fauna National Reserve, Potosí, Bolivia

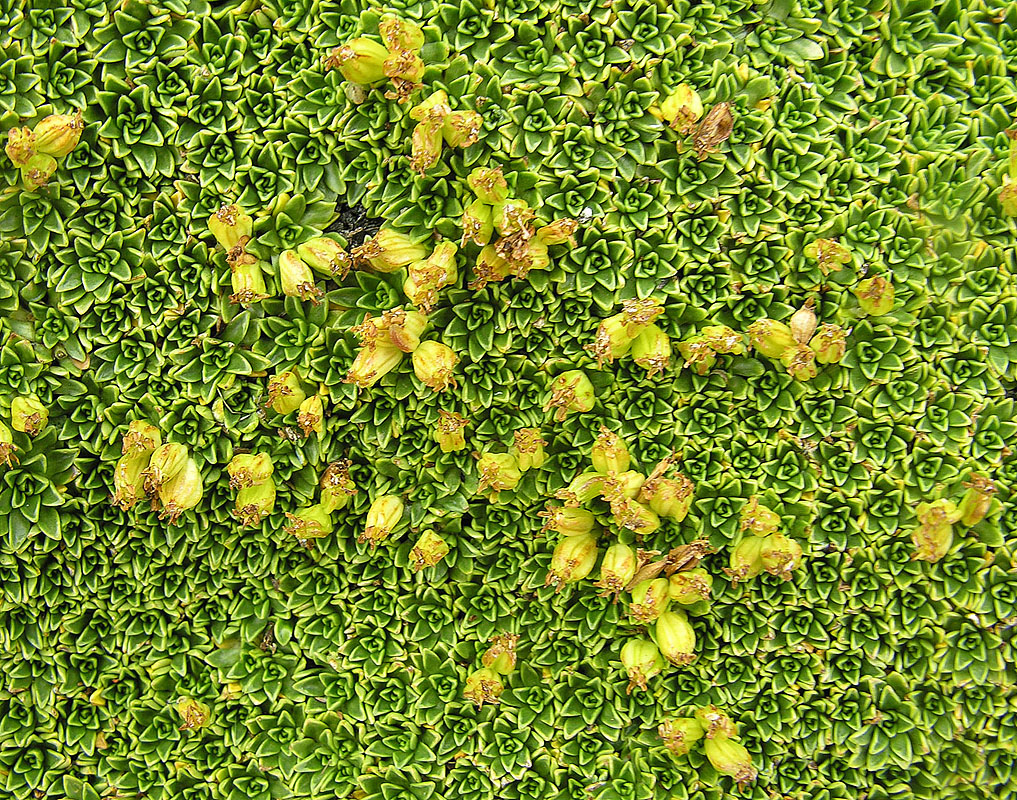
Close-up showing seeds

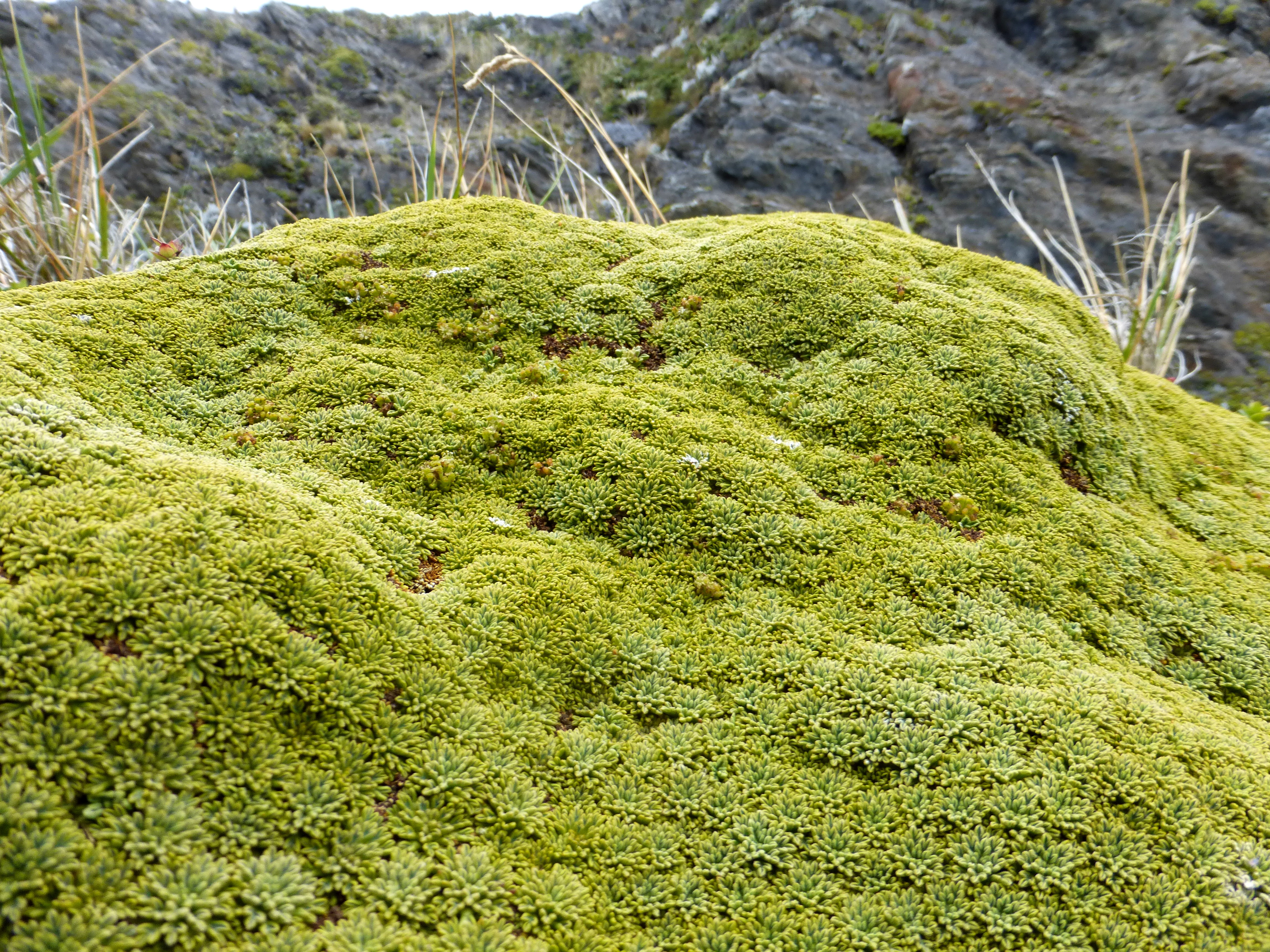
Texture of surface

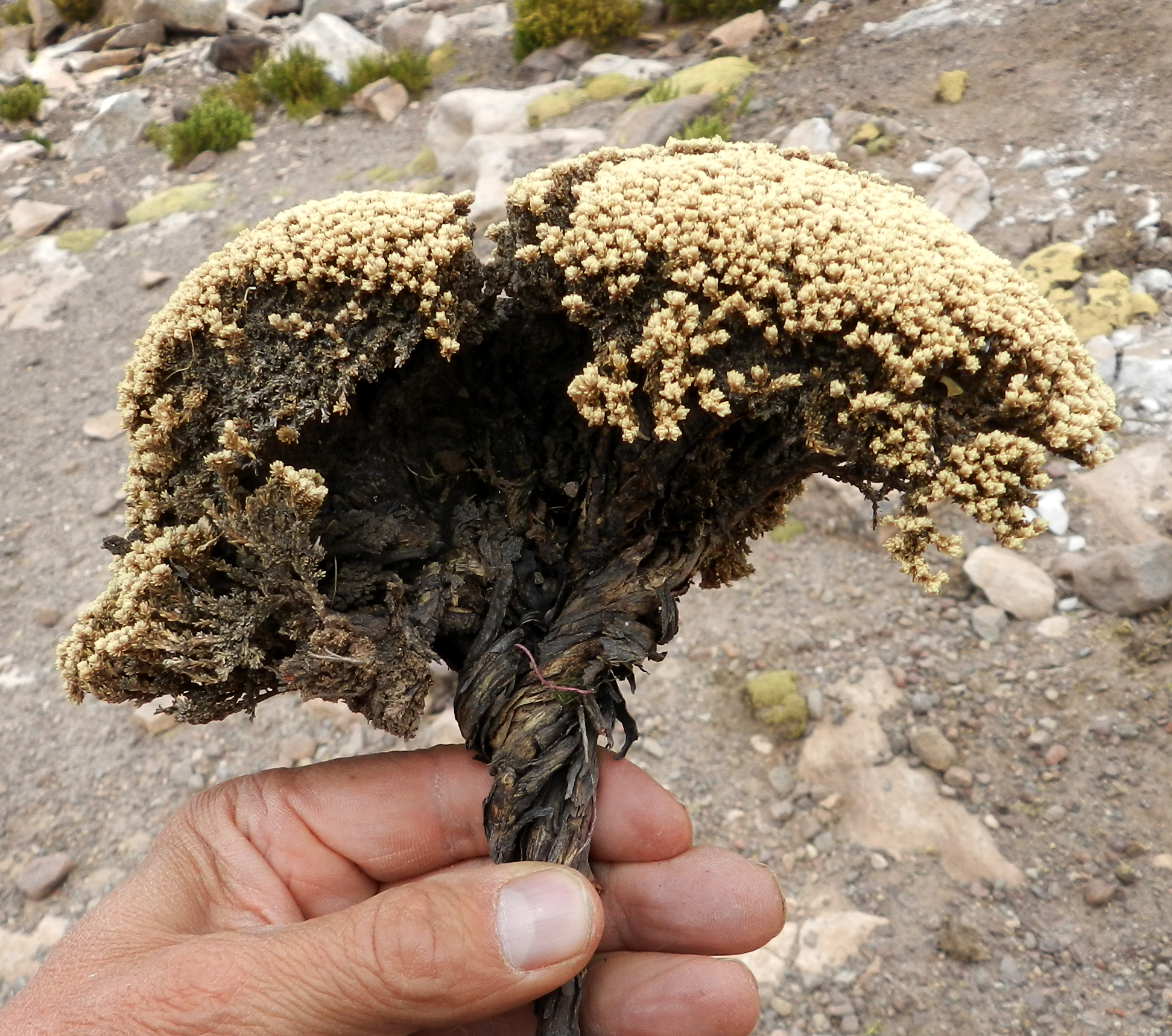
Structure of part of a plant
