= Lauca National Park =

Wildlife park in northern Chile

- IUCN category II (national park)
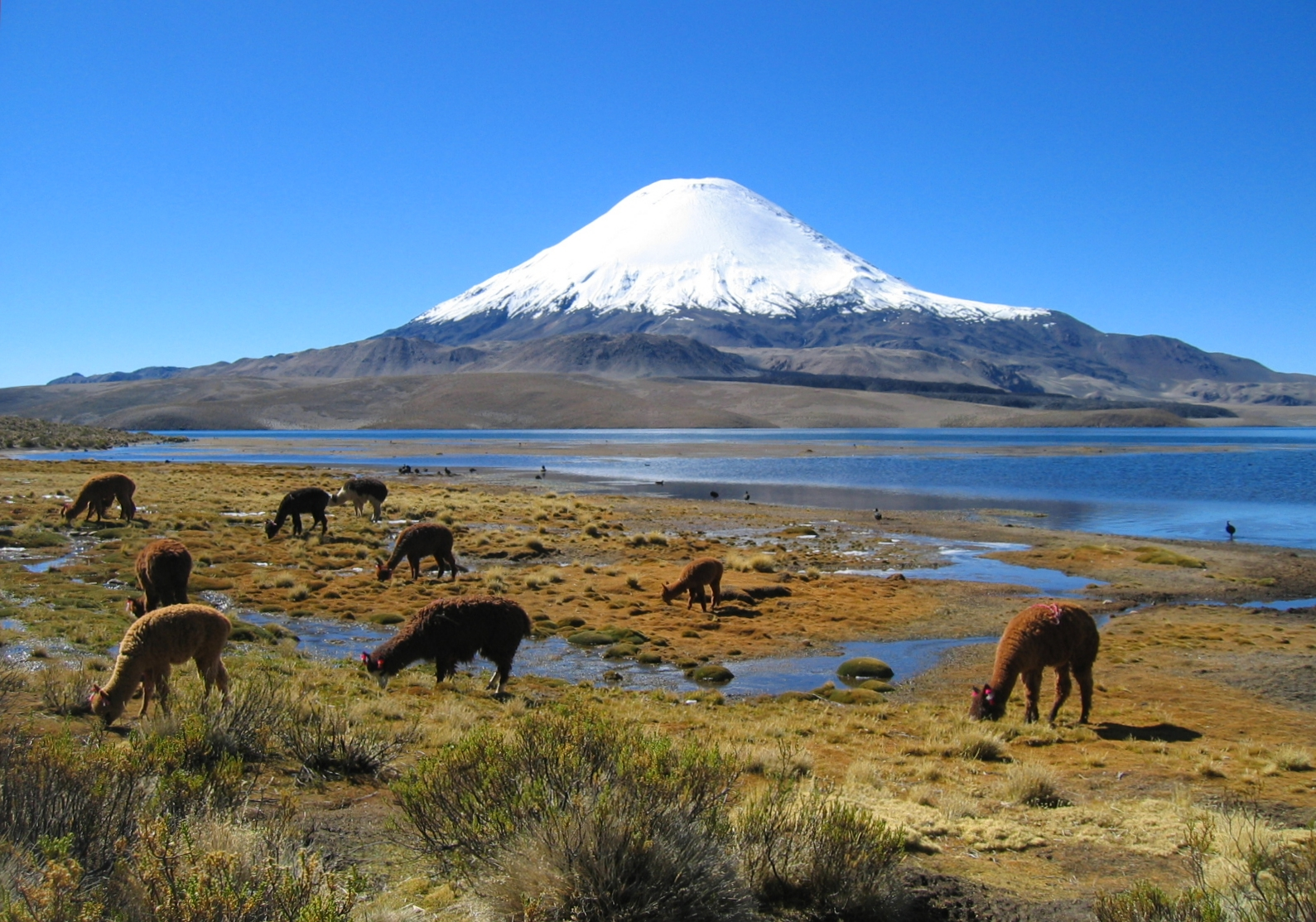
- Llamas and alpacas at Lauca NP, with Parinacota Volcano in the background

- Location within Chile
- Location: Arica-Parinacota Region, Chile
- Nearest city: Putre
- Coordinates: 18°14′40″S 69°21′14″W
- Area: 1,379 km^{2} (532 sq mi)
- Established: 1970
- Visitors: 12,087 (in 2012)
- Governing body: Corporación Nacional Forestal

Lauca National Park is in Chile's Norte Grande (Far North), within the Andean range. It encompasses an area of 1,379 km² of altiplano and mountains, the latter consisting mainly of enormous volcanoes. Las Vicuñas National Reserve is its neighbour to the south. Both protected areas, along with Salar de Surire Natural Monument, form Lauca Biosphere Reserve. The park borders Sajama National Park in Bolivia.

== Position ==
The park is located 145 kilometres (90 mi) east of Arica and 12 kilometres (7.5 mi) west of Putre, between 18°03' S - 18°27' S and 69°02' W - 69°39' W, and 3,200 metres (10,500 ft) to 6,342 metres (20,807 ft) msnm.

== Geography ==
One of the main attractions of the park is the small lacustrine area formed by Chungará and Cotacotani lakes, which lies at the foothills of the Payachata volcanic group. Other majestic volcanoes forming part of the national park are the Guallatiri and the Acotango. Lauca features include archaeological sites, lava fields and volcanic calderas. Within the park is located the town of Parinacota with its colonial church.

The headwaters of Lauca River are also found within the park and bordering it to the west is Lluta River.

The international Chile Route 11 passes through this protected area. It runs from Chile Route 5 in the vicinity of Arica to Tambo Quemado Pass and provides the main access to the park.

== Biology ==
The park lies within the Central Andean dry puna ecoregion.

Several species of animals and plants can be found in the park. Mammals in the area include vicuñas, llamas, alpacas, guanacos, tarucas, cougars and vizcachas.

There are over 140 bird species, making it one of the best national parks for birding in Chile. Those include puna ibis, Andean goose, giant coot, puna tinamou, silvery grebe, crested duck, puna teal, Andean condor and Chilean flamingo.

Over 400 species of vascular plants grow in Lauca National Park. The park's vegetation is adapted to the harsh puna environment, as are the bofedales, llaretales and Andean steppes.

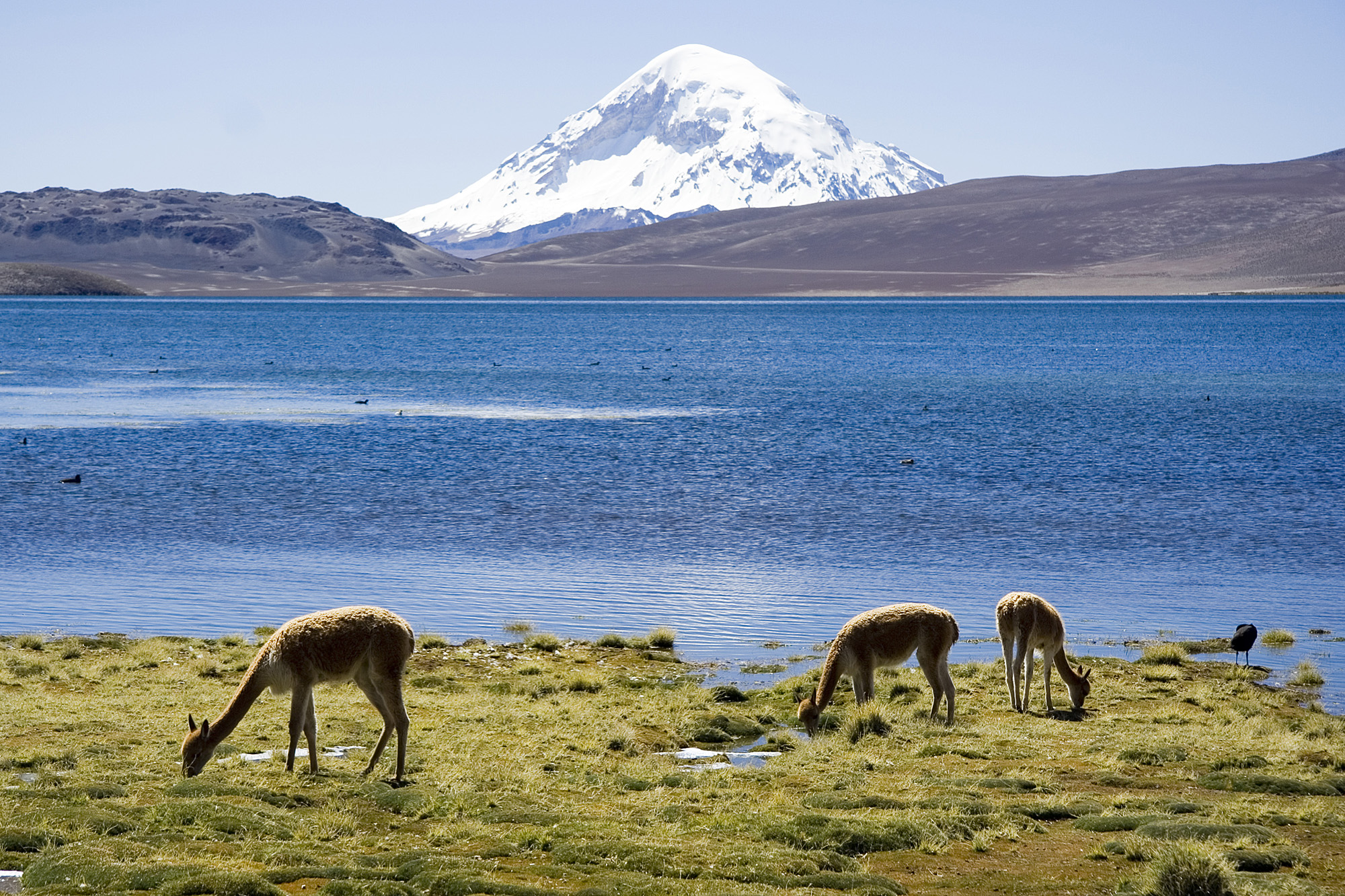
Chungará Lake and Sajama stratovolcano

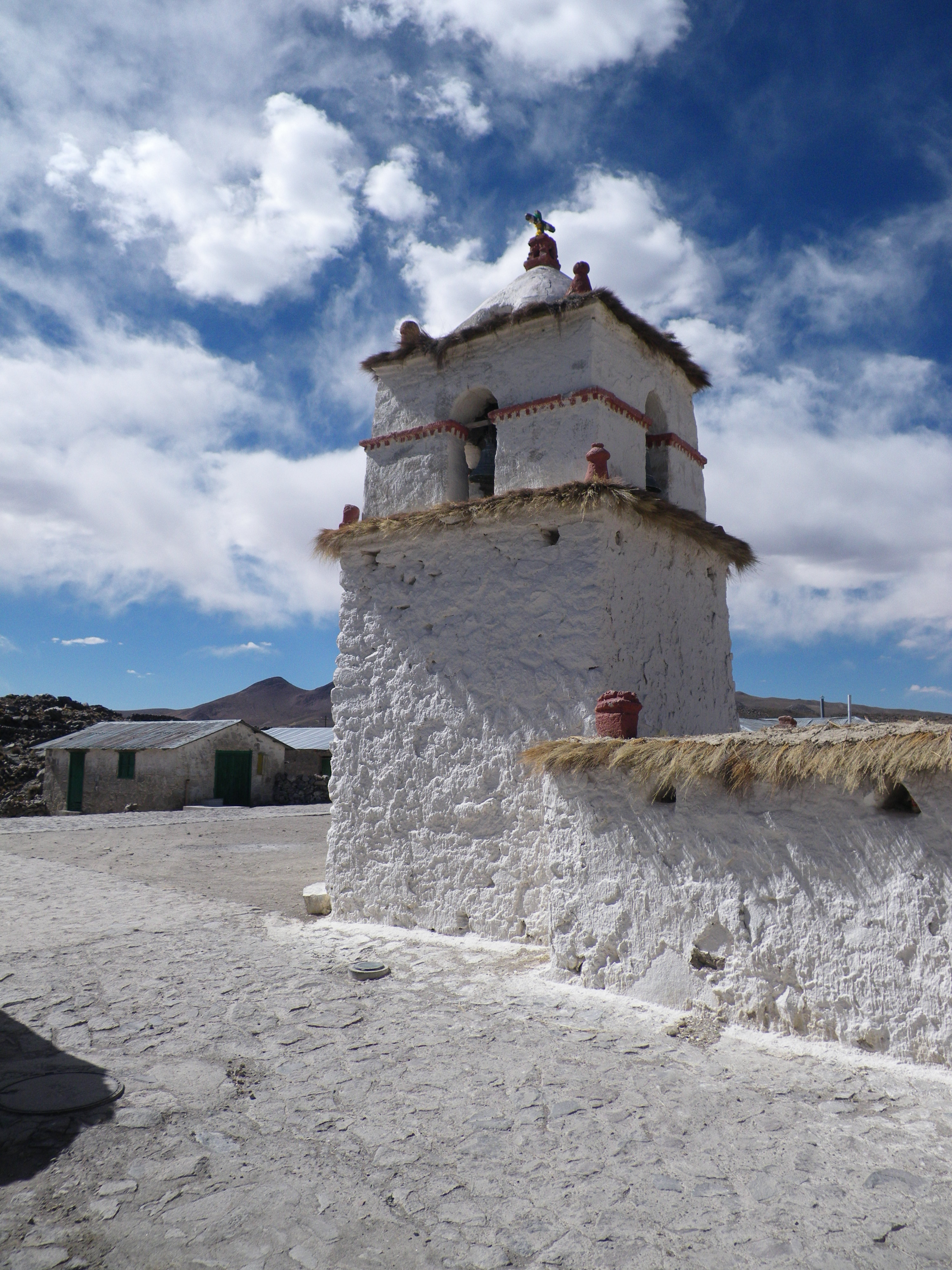
The church in Parinacota village
