= Payachata =

Complex of volcanos in South America

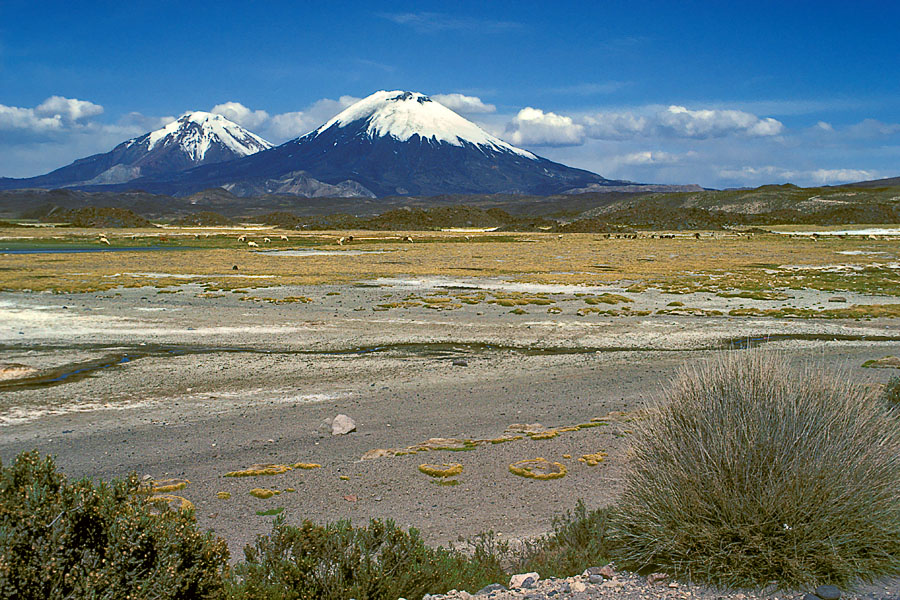
- The Pomerape (left) and Parinacota (right) volcanoes

Highest point
- Elevation: Parinacota: 6,348 m (20,827 ft); Pomerape: 6,282 m (20,610 ft)
- Coordinates: 18°9.799′S 69°8.550′W

Geography
- Location: Bolivia-Chile
- Parent range: Andes

Geology
- Mountain type: Stratovolcano
- Last eruption: 290 AD ± 300 years (Parinacota)

Payachata or Paya Chata (Aymara pä, paya two, Pukina chata mountain, "two mountains") is a north–south trending complex of potentially active volcanos on the border of Bolivia and Chile, directly north of Chungará Lake. The complex contains two peaks, Pomerape to the north and Parinacota to the south. On the Bolivian side the volcanoes are located in the Oruro Department, Sajama Province, Curahuara de Carangas Municipality, and on the Chilean side they lie in the Arica y Parinacota Region, Parinacota Province.

According to helium surface dating, Parinacota has erupted within the last 2000 years, while Pomerape is Pleistocene.

== See also ==
- List of volcanoes in Bolivia
- List of volcanoes in Chile
