= Lauca River =

River in Bolivia and Chile

Coordinates: 19.3833°S 68.1667°W

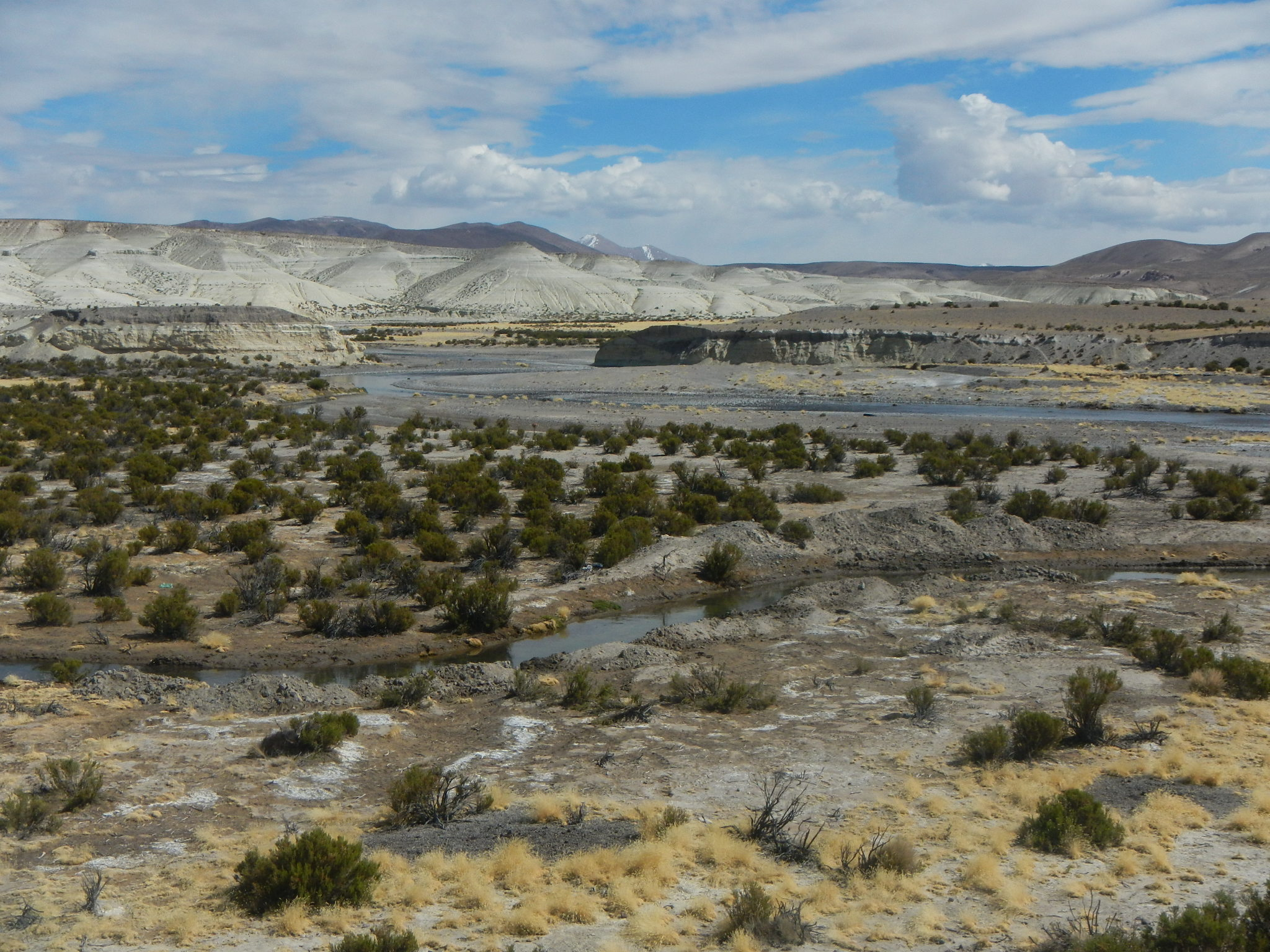
- Etymology: Aymara

Location
- Countries: Bolivia; Chile
- Departments (BO): La Paz; Oruro
- Regions (CL): Arica and Parinacota; Tarapacá

Physical characteristics
- Source: Parinacota wetlands
  - location: Parinacota Province
  - elevation: 4,350 m (14,270 ft)
- Mouth: Coipasa Lake
  - location: Sabaya Province
- Length: 225 km (140 mi)
- Discharge
  - average: 0.79 m^{3}/s (28 cu ft/s)

Map

The Lauca River is a binational river. It originates in the Chilean Altiplano of the Arica and Parinacota Region, crosses the Andes and empties into Coipasa Lake in Bolivia.

The upper reach of the river lies within the boundaries of Lauca National Park in the Parinacota Province. The Lauca receives waters from a group of lakes known as Quta Qutani through the Desaguadero River. In this area, there is a type of marsh known as Parinacota wetlands, in which converge several streams, being the more important the river just mentioned, which has a variable flow rate ranging from 100 to 560 L/s, and an average of 260 L/s.

From its source in the Parinacota wetlands the river flows west. The spurs of the Cordillera Central (also known as Chapiquiña) form an obstacle impossible to pass through, forcing the river's course southward. In the vicinity of Wallatiri volcano, the Lauca turns again, now eastward crossing from Chile into Bolivia at the latitude of Macaya, at an elevation of 3,892 m asl and with a flow rate about 2,6 m³/s. In Chile the river drains an area of 2,350 km².

In the Bolivian Altiplano, the Lauca collects the waters of the rivers Sajama and Coipasa, raising its flow rate up to 8 m³/s before turning south to empty into Coipasa Lake, close to the salt flat of the same name.

During the 1930s, the Chilean government begun to use the hydrical resources of Lauca river for irrigation in the Azapa Valley, generating a complaint from Bolivian government who argued that Chilean authorities were altering the course of an international river. Chile answered that the natural course of the river was not modified, but the works executed were related to the use of waters in the Parinacota wetlands, which not affect the total water flow of the Lauca in its course to Bolivia. The litigation between both countries, started in 1939, caused diplomatic tension until the 1960s.
