= Pomerape =

Mountain in Chile

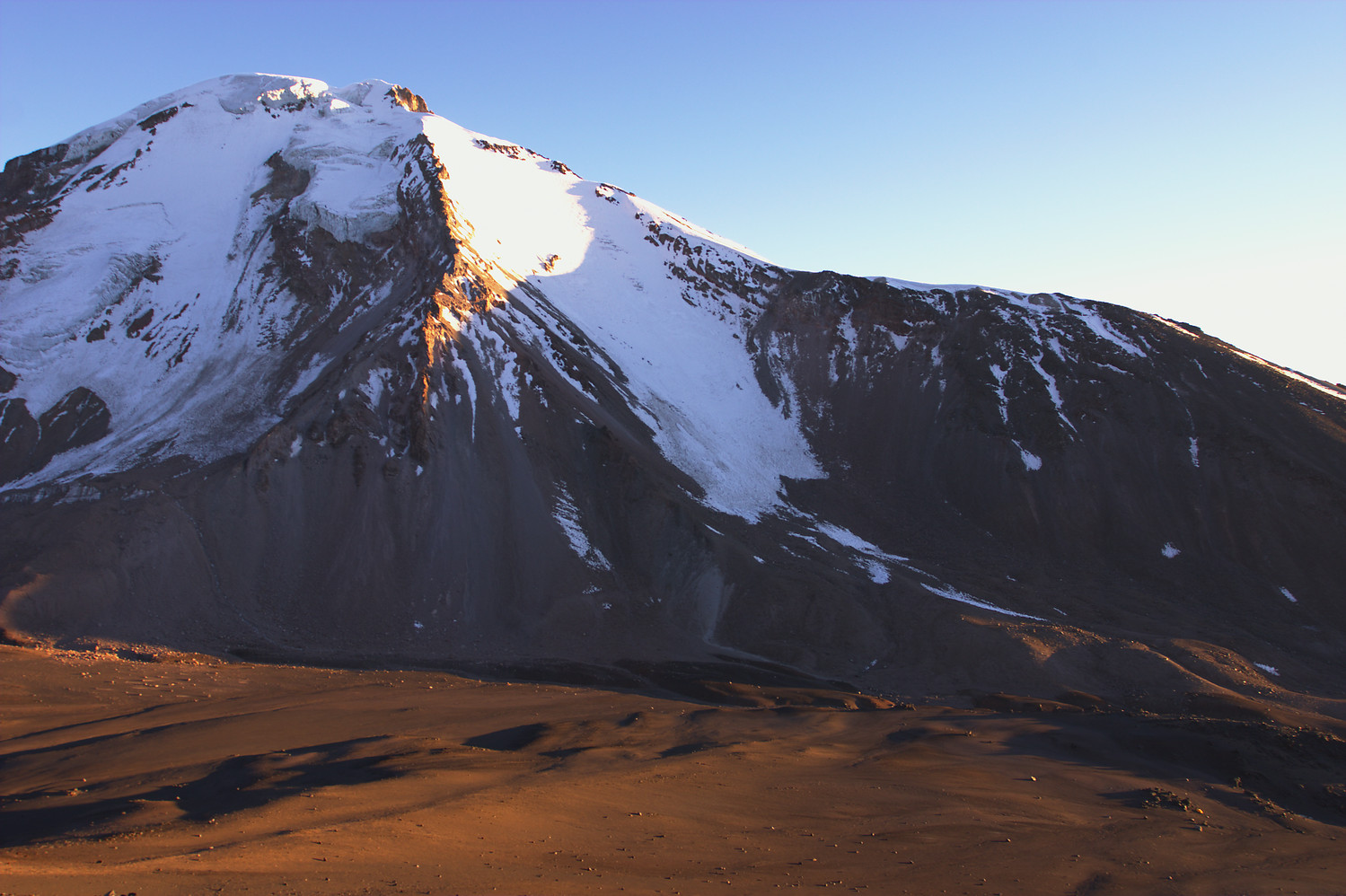
- Pomerape and the saddle below, as seen from south (Parinacota slopes)

Highest point
- Elevation: 6,282 m (20,610 ft)
- Coordinates: 18°07′33″S 69°07′39″W

Geography
- Location within Bolivia
- Location: Bolivia-Chile
- Parent range: Andes

Geology
- Rock age: Pleistocene
- Mountain type: Stratovolcano

Climbing
- Easiest route: snow/ice climb

Pomerape is a stratovolcano lying on the border of northern Chile and Bolivia (Oruro Department, Sajama Province, Curahuara de Carangas Municipality). It is part of the Payachata complex of volcanoes, together with Parinacota Volcano to the south. The name "Payachata" means "twins" and refers to their appearance. It hosts glaciers down to elevations of 5,300–5,800 metres (17,400–19,000 ft), lower on the northern slope.

Pomerape is a complex of lava domes, accompanied by lava flows which were emplaced atop of the domes. It was active about 200,000 years ago. The lava domes formed first and were later buried by the actual volcanic cone, which unlike the rhyolitic-dacitic domes is formed by hornblende andesite. The "Chungará Andesites" and lava dome complex of Parinacota were laid down at this time. Pomerape is associated with an adventive vent that has erupted mafic magmas. The main cone was last active 106,000 +- 7,000 years ago, the adventive vent is dated to 205,000 ± 24,000 years ago.

Climbing the volcano is alpine grade PD by the east ridge. Harder routes exist on the south face, sometimes on 50+ degree snow/rubble slope. For these routes a camp can be established at 5,300 metres (17,390 ft) at the saddle between Parinacota and Pomerape. Depending on the season, the main difficulty can be penitentes (tall ice-blade needles), which make the ascent physically difficult or impossible.

== See also ==
- List of volcanoes in Bolivia
