= Rupture of the Blockade of Arica =

1880 naval battle of the War of the Pacific

- Part of Naval campaign of the War of the Pacific
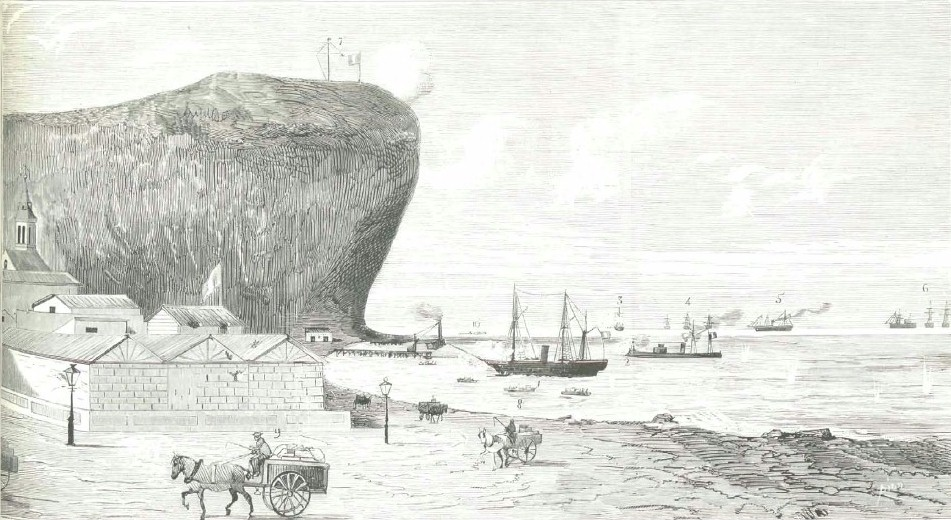
- The Corvette Unión forcing its way through the blockade
| Date | March 17, 1880 |
| Location | Arica, Tarapacá, Peru |
| Result | Peruvian victory |

Belligerents
| Peru | Chile |

Commanders and leaders
| Manuel Villavicencio; José Lagomarsino | Juan José Latorre; Carlos Condell |

Strength
| 2 ironclads, 1 transport | 2 corvettes, 5 land batteries with 13 guns |

Casualties and losses
| 1 killed, 8 wounded | 9 killed, 18 wounded |

The Rupture of the Blockade of Arica was a naval battle of the War of the Pacific during the Blockade of Arica. The rupture was carried out by Manuel Villavicencio who commanded the BAP Unión of the Peruvian Navy. The Unión broke the Chilean blockade of the port twice in less than 8 hours on March 17, 1880.

== Background ==
After losing the Huáscar in the Battle of Angamos, Chile had gained naval dominance and began planning the Land Campaign against Peru .

The Chilean army landed its expeditionary force in Ilo and Mollendo while its fleet blocked Arica from November 28, 1879 to prevent the Peruvian garrison from receiving reinforcements from Lima .

By that time, Peru had already lost most of its southern ports such as Iquique, Ilo and Pisagua but Arica was a port defended by heavy guns and the Manco Cápac monitor that served as a floating battery. The Naval Battle of Arica had begun in the port on February 27, 1880 where the Chilean frigate captain and commander of the blockade, Manuel Thomson was killed in the battle. The port was then bombarded from February 29 to March 6, but without heavy losses. During the blockade, there were neutral ships from other countries such as the French Hussard, the German SMS Hansa, and the British HMS Thetis and HMS Shannon but were anchored a safe distance from the bay as their task was to observe the development of the blockade and the combats that could occur between the Chilean fleet and the Peruvian defenses of the port.

=== Southern Expedition ===
In the first days of March 1880, the ship's captain, Manuel Villavicencio, was summoned by the supreme director of Peru, Nicolás de Piérola. Piérola told him that it was essential to break the Blockade of Arica and deliver weapons and supplies to the Arica garrison. Hearing Piérola's orders, Villavicencio replied:

Mr. President, during the last ten months aboard the Chalaco, I have fulfilled my duties, and I have managed to evade every enemy warship that has come my way. Now that I am in charge of a faster ship, you can be sure, God willing, that despite the blockade, I will enter Arica. I can't assure you that I will return, but I will do what I can.

During the following days, Villavicencio loaded the Unión with 37 boxes of shoes, 39 bales of white canvas, 1 box with 190 buttons, 5 boxes with 2 full machine guns, 100 boxes with 100,000 shots for Remington rifles, and the BAP Alianza to increase night surveillance of the bay, carried out until then only by the Bolivian torpedo Sorata. On March 12, 1880, Colonel Nicolás de Piérola, Supreme Director of the Republic, arrived at Callao to personally bid farewell to Commander Villavicencio and the Unión crew. At 11:00 a.m., the Unión made the maneuvers to undock the port of Callao, maneuvered between the merchant ships anchored in the roadstead, It headed for San Lorenzo Island and then headed south. The Unión landed on the afternoon of the 14th in Quilca where after receiving news from the PSNC steamer Mendoza, it continued its journey to Arica on the afternoon of March 15.

They wanted to take advantage of the fact that the blockade of Arica was only sustained by two ships: the ironclad Huáscar and the transport Matías Cousiño. These ships sailed on the high seas at night and returned to the port at dawn, so they would try to enter the port at dawn.

At the same time, the BAP Talismán set sail on March 11, 1880 bound for Quilca with a load of: 2 crates of medicines, 90 crates with 1,800 Remington 0.50-caliber rifles, 578 crates with 500,000 shots for said rifles, 100 crates with 200 thousand shots for Remington caliber 0.43 in, 2 boxes with 20 thousand shots for Winchester rifles, 4 Blakely 9-pounder cannons, 2 howitzers of 12-pounders and 24 boxes with projectiles for the cannons. Brigadier General Manuel Beingolea, who was going to command the 2nd Army of the South, which was being formed in Arequipa, was traveling in the transport. The transport arrived in Quilca on March 14, but the commander of the ship, Lieutenant Commander Manuel Carrasco, decided not to disembark when he saw strange lights and after a court martial, he decided to sail to Pisco and there he unloaded his cargo.

== Opposing forces ==
=== Peru ===
The Arica batteries were under the command of Commander Arnaldo Panizo and were divided into those on land, those in the north and those in the hills. The head of the plaza of Arica was the captain of the ship Camilo Carrillo.

The Morro batteries, located south of the port in the Morro de Arica, were:

High Battery: 1 Vavasseur 250 lb, 2 Parrott 100 lb and 2 Voruz 70 lb. Low Battery: towards La Lisera beach, 4 Voruz of 70 lb. During the combat, a Voruz cannon was blown south of the nose, on La Lisera beach, due to the defect of the projectile's fuse, which caused the bomb to explode inside the cannon.

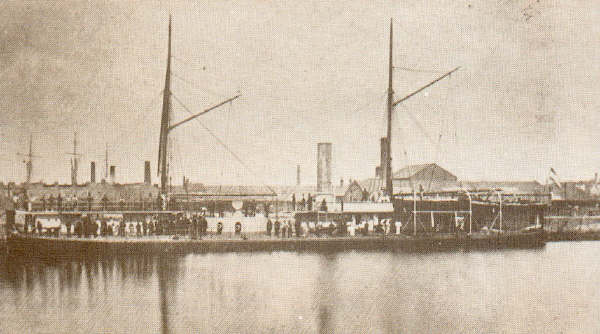

The Manco Cápac was a monitor with a displacement of 2,100 tons. Its armor was 127 mm and 254 mm in the rotating turret, which carried two 500 lb Dahlgren guns. She was assigned to the Bolivian speedboat Sorata, which was used for night patrol. Its propulsion system was with a propeller, being able to reach a maximum speed, on the day of combat, of 3.5 kn. She was under the command of the frigate captain José Sánchez Lagomarsino.

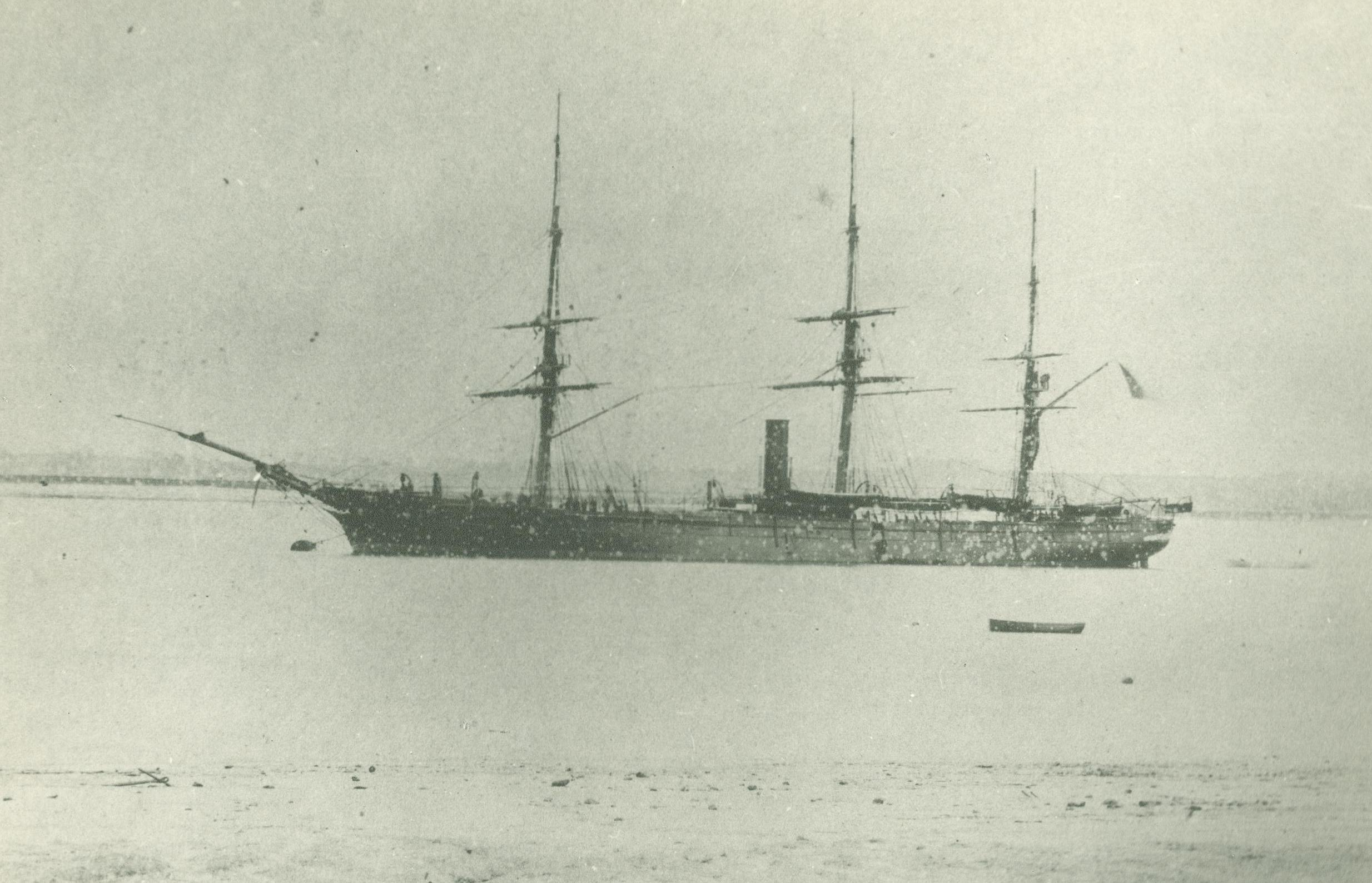

The Union was a corvette built in 1865, with a wooden hull protected with iron and copper. She displaced 2,066.66 t and had 12 Voruz muzzle-loading rifled guns of 70 lb as main armament, in the battery, 6 per side. She also had 2 Armstrong 70-pound guns in the bow and a Withworth 9-pound muzzle-loading gun. Her propulsion system was also mixed, with a propeller, she being able to reach a maximum speed of 13 kn. She was under the command of the ship's captain Manuel Villavicencio.

=== Chile ===
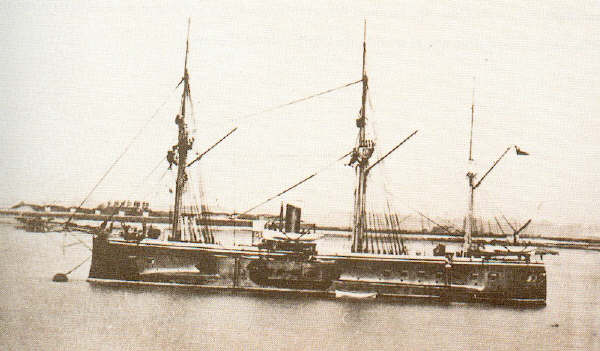

The Almirante Cochrane was an ironclad of a 3,560 t displacement, in service from 1874 and 1875 respectively. They had 230 mm thick armor and their main armament consisted of 6 Armstrong 250 lb muzzle-loading guns in battery, 3 per side. Her minor armament was two 1-inch Nordentfeldt machine guns on the bridge, two 7-pound Armstrong muzzle-loading guns, and two 20-pound Armstrong breech-loading guns. Her propulsion system was mixed, steam engine, with double propeller, and sailbeing able to reach a maximum speed, the day of the combat, of 12 knots. The Almirante Cochrane was under the command of Captain Juan José Latorre.

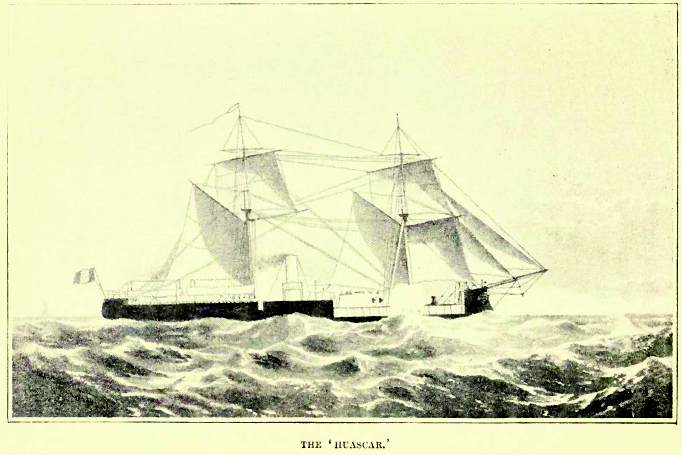

The Huáscar was an ironclad with a displacement of 1,745 tons built in 1865. She has 114.3 mm thick armor on the hull and her main armament consisted, at the time, of two 300 lb Armstrong muzzle-loading guns located in a rotating armored turret. Under the Chilean flag, modern artillery was added: two Armstrong 40- lb breech-loading guns with a range of 7,000 m, one on the starboard quarterdeck and one on the port quarterdeck, and a 1-lb Hotchkiss rapid-fire cannon. She also had a 0.44 in Gatling gunon the top of the mainmast. Her propulsion system was with a propeller, being able to reach a maximum speed, on the day of combat, of 8 kn . After the death in February of its first Chilean commander, Manuel Thomson, also commander of the blockade, he was commanded by Commander Carlos Condell.

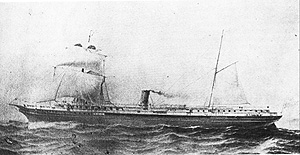

The Amazonas was a transport that had belonged to the Pacific Steam Navigation Company and had been purchased during the war. In service since 1859, she has an iron hull, where she displaced 2,019 t. She was armed with a 6-inch Armstrong gun, being capable of a maximum speed of 13 kn.

== The Double Rupture ==
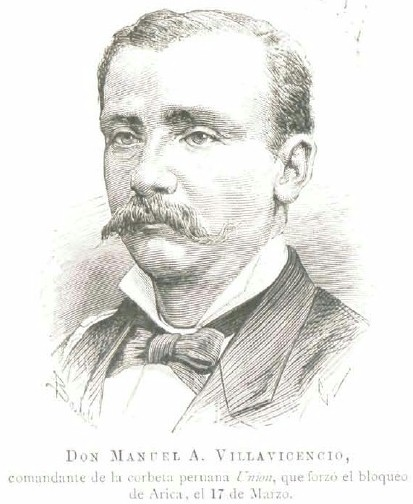
Manuel Villavicencio, commander of the Peruvian corvette Unión.

On March 17, 1880, at 02:00 am, the Peruvian corvette appeared in Arica, when the Chilean ships were on the high seas. The Unión moved slowly toward the port, covered by darkness and absolute silence on board. At 04:00 am, at a safe distance, Villavicencio detached a boat from his ship to notify the land authorities of his presence. At 04:30 am the Peruvian corvette entered the anchorage and received the Bolivian speedboat Sorata and anchored next to the monitor Manco Cápac. The Unión's presence was received with joy not only by the Peruvian garrison, but also by the crews of foreign warships, who had noticed and observed the maneuvers of the Peruvian corvette.

The Chileans who maintained the blockade only realized what was happening in broad daylight, when the Unión was already unloading supplies for the Peruvian army in Arica. The commander of the Huáscar, frigate captain Carlos Condell and accidental commander of the blockade, ordered the transport Matías Cousiño to sail to Pacocha to notify the Commander of the Chilean squadron, Rear Admiral Galvarino Riveros of the presence of the Peruvian corvette Unión and request reinforcements to strengthen the blockade. Condell decided to attack the Unión, taking advantage of their long-range 40-pound guns that allowed him to attack without being touched by the cannons of the batteries of the port. At 8:50 am the bombardment began with the Huáscar making 11 shots and was answered by 3 from the Unión and 2 from the Morro batteries.

At 9 a.m. 2 smokes were sighted from the south, which turned out to be the Almirante Cochrane and the Amazonas. The Almirante Cochrane, which was returning from Iquique to replace the Huáscar in the blockade, and the Amazonas, which brought spare ammunition to the ironclad from Ilo. Both ships had met at dawn in Caleta Vítor, 15 miles south of Arica. The Almirante Cochrane was under the command of Captain Juan José Latorre, who, as the superior officer, would take command of the flotilla. The Peruvians confused the Almirante Cochrane with the Blanco Encalada. The Almirante Cochrane and the Huáscar were put together so that their commanders could confer and agree on an attack on the Peruvian corvette.

At 12:00, the Chilean squad spread out in offensive formation and began firing simultaneously at the Union 4,000 meters away. The Chilean artillery fire was intense and made a total of 84 shots against the Peruvian corvette, while the Peruvian batteries made 43 shots, the monitor Manco Cápac made 4 shots and the Unión corvette made 20 shots. Two bombs hit the Peruvian ship Unión and another 5 exploded in the air, destroying part of the command bridge, all the lifeboats, coal supplies and 8 to get injured. The Almirante Cochrane received 4 shots and one from the monitor Manco Cápac, which shook and loosened the joints of the plate in its entirety, but without penetrating the armor. Another 2 shots landed on the water line without also piercing it and another one destroyed the apothecary. The Huáscar received four thick projectiles: 3 in the hull and one in the foremast, without major damage. The Chilean ships had no casualties.

Once the Unión docked at the port of Arica, the unloading of food, weapons, ammunition and the Alianza torpedo boat began, which was under the command of First Lieutenant Leoncio Prado. This operation lasted 8 hours, during which, the Unión fought with the Chilean squadron.

The Chilean squad fanned out, trying to close the subsequent escape, but at 4:20 p.m., Captain Manuel Villavicencio, Commander of the Unión, and his second commander, Commander Arístides Aljovín, discovered that all the commanders of the ships holding the blockade began to converge on the Almirante Cochrane. Indeed, in the Almirante Cochrane a Board of Commanders of Chilean ships was held, summoned by Captain Juan José Latorre, in which they discussed the next actions to follow to finish sinking the Peruvian corvette. The Chilean ships were located in front of Chacalluta, north of the port. At 4:30 p.m., Commander Villavicencio addressed the crew of the Peruvian corvette, asking: "Men, do you want to die on land or at sea?" The answer was unanimous: “In the sea!”. And so the order was given to weigh anchor. Then Captain Villavicencio ordered Frigate Captain Arístides Aljovín to hoist the anchor only a few meters, keeping it in the water, so that to the observation of the Chilean ships it would appear that the Peruvian ship was anchored. Like the Unión, she had maintained pressure throughout the combat and during the discharge of the day. At 5:00 pm, the Unión undocked from the Arica docks, maneuvering inside the roadstead and heading towards Alacrán Island. At the height of this island, instead of turning north, he headed south towards Chilean waters. Afterwards, he headed west at night and then north.

Captain Latorre, noticing the maneuver, ordered his commanders to follow and capture the Peruvian corvette. Villavicencio governed the Unión and managed to evade the pursuing Chilean ships and begin sailing back to Lima.

== Aftermath ==
The Peruvian ship entered the port of Callao on March 20, 1880, to the amazement of all. She had carried out a difficult mission and the government, in recognition, conferred the Iron Cross on her.

In a letter dated March 18, 1880, Lieutenant Colonel Ricardo O'Donovan, Chief of Staff of the Seventh Division of the Peruvian Army in Arica, wrote to his brother Enrique in Trujillo about Villavicencio's action:

After I wrote to you yesterday, the anxiety about the combat in Arica continued and with the conviction that the corvette Unión would be lost. Villavicencio asked what he would do when part of the cauldron was broken and the corvette was slowing down to 10 knots. Montero authorized him not to leave and until he beached the ship if necessary and what would not have been the pleasure of all to see that the damage is complete and he undertakes his departure and escapes from the enemies like an eagle; She was chased by the Almirante Cochrane and had to abandon the company, returning to the port in shame. It is said that the Amazonas followed the Unión. Villavicencio is therefore the man called to execute these companies. Intelligence, courage and fortune; I saluted him in the order of the square as you will see in the saint that I gave for the service of the army.

There were recriminations in Chile against the squadron because the Union was able to escape from Arica, but Captain Latorre took responsibility and the criticism subsided.
