= Visviri =

- Location in Chile
- Coordinates: 17°35′41″S 69°28′54″W
- Country: Chile
- Admin. division: Arica y Parinacota
- Province: Parinacota Province
- Commune: General Lagos

Population (2002)
  - Total: 265

Visviri is a Chilean hamlet at the northern end of the country and the capital of the General Lagos commune in Parinacota Province, Arica and Parinacota Region. It is notable for being Chile's northernmost populated area, and for being near the border of three countries: Bolivia, Peru and Chile. The Bolivian settlement of Charaña is located to the east and Tripartito, Peru lies to the north.
