= Pachama =

Coordinates: 18°25′46″S 69°31′44″W

- Village
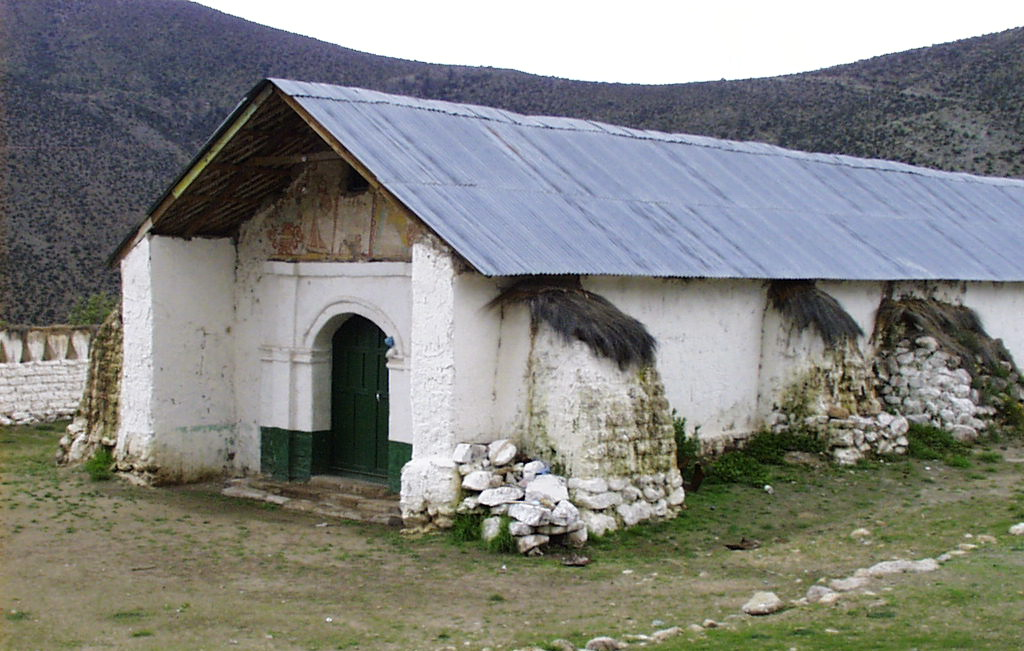
- Church of San Andrés Apóstol in Pachama
- Interactive map of Pachama
- Country: Chile
- Region: Arica and Parinacota Region

Pachama is a Chilean village in the commune of Putre, part of the Parinacota Province. It belongs to the Arica y Parinacota Region since 2007, when this new region was split from the Tarapacá Region.
