= Molinos, Chile =

Coordinates: 18°22′50″S 69°56′40″W

Molinos
- Village
- Interactive map of Molinos
- Country: Chile
- Region: Arica and Parinacota Region

Molinos is a village in the Arica and Parinacota Region, Chile. It is located south of the border with Peru, and just south of the Lluta River. The Lluta flooded in 2019 and temporarily cut off access to the village. As of the census in 2002, the village had a population of 39, most of whom were men.
