= Chucuyo =

Coordinates: 18°12′55″S 69°17′40″W

- Village
- Interactive map of Chucuyo
- Country: Chile
- Region: Arica and Parinacota Region

Chucuyo is a village in the Arica and Parinacota Region, Chile.

== See also ==
- Parinacota, Chile
- Lauca National Park
