= Quebrada de Cardones Natural Monument =

Natural monument in Chile

- IUCN category III (natural monument or feature)
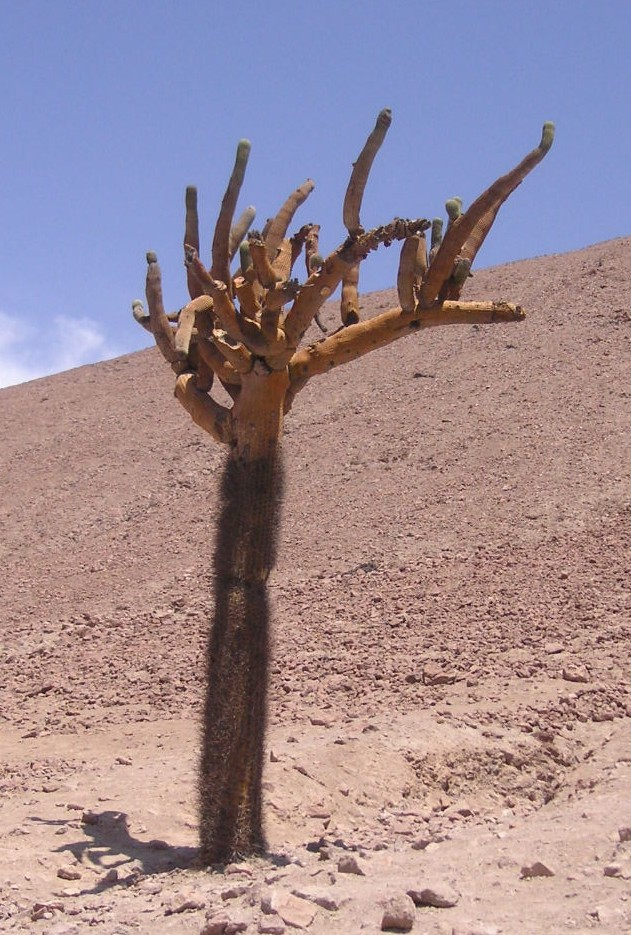
- Browningia candelaris
- Interactive map of Quebrada de Cardones Natural Monument
- Location: Arica y Parinacota Region, Chile
- Coordinates: 18°26′S 69°44′W
- Governing body: Corporación Nacional Forestal

Quebrada de Cardones Natural Monument is a natural monument located in the Arica y Parinacota Region, Chile. It is traversed by Chile Route 11. About 73 plant species are found in this protected area, chief of which being the Browningia candelaris.
