= Guañacagua =

Coordinates: 18°49′04″S 69°42′32″W

- Village
- Interactive map of Guañacagua
- Country: Chile
- Region: Arica and Parinacota Region

Guañacagua (hispanicized spelling of Aymara Waña Q'awa, waña dry, q'awa little river, ditch, crevice, fissure, gap in the earth, "dry brook" or "dry ravine") is a village in the Arica and Parinacota Region, Chile.
