= Diego Paco =

Chilean politician and regional governor of Arica and Parinacota (born 1990)

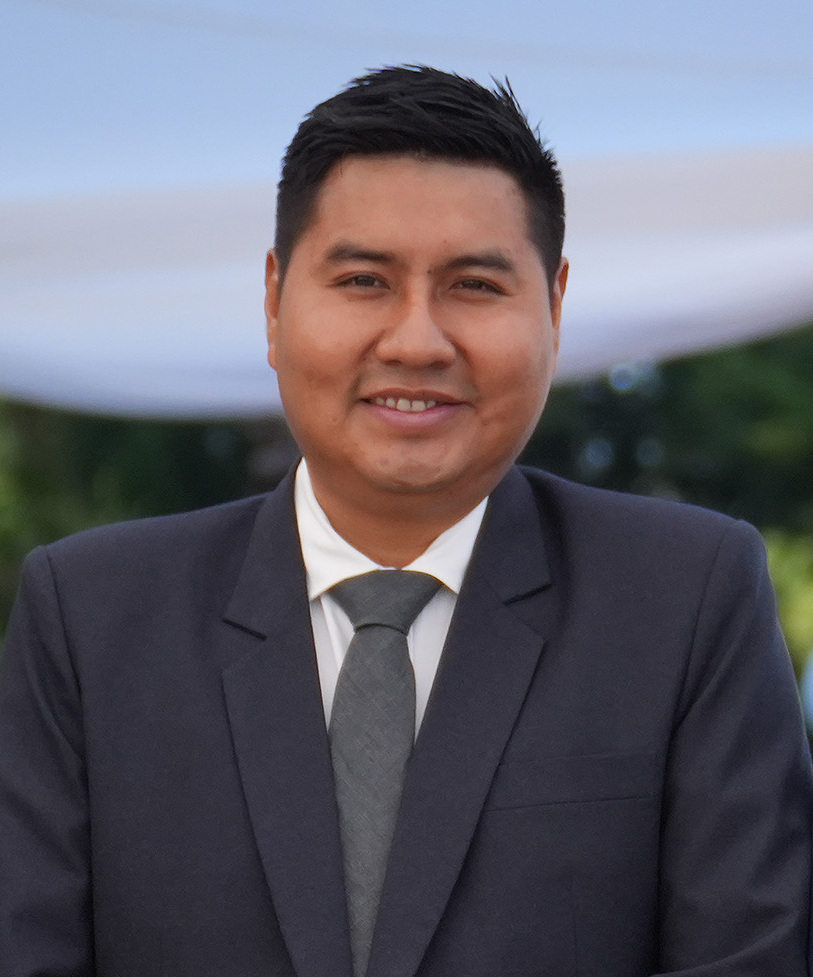
- Paco in 2025

Governor of Arica and Parinacota
- Incumbent
- Assumed office 6 January 2025
- Preceded by: Romina Cifuentes González (interim)

Regional Councillor of Arica and Parinacota
- In office 11 March 2018 – 23 March 2020
- Constituency: Parinacota Province

Personal details
- Born: Diego Jovany Paco Mamani; 1990 Arica and Parinacota Region, Chile
- Party: National Renewal
- Education: Andrés Bello University
- Occupation: Commercial engineer Politician

Diego Jovany Paco Mamani (born 1990) is a Chilean commercial engineer and politician. Since 6 January 2025, he has served as Regional Governor of Arica and Parinacota.

== Biography ==
Paco was born in the Arica and Parinacota Region in 1990. He comes from an Aymara family and is the son of Lidia Mamani and Hugo Paco.

He completed his secondary education at Colegio San Jorge and later studied Commercial engineering at Andrés Bello University between 2009 and 2014, where he served as vice-president of the student council of his program.

For eleven years, he worked as owner and general manager of Distribuidora La Paloma, a company with four branches in Arica and northern Chile.

== Political career ==
A member of National Renewal (RN), Paco has acted as a representative of Indigenous peoples in the region. In the 2017 regional elections, he was elected as a regional councillor for Parinacota Province, obtaining 16.7% of the vote.

In the 2021 Chilean parliamentary election, he ran as a candidate for deputy in District No. 1 but was not elected.

In the 2024 Chilean regional elections, Paco was the candidate of the Chile Vamos coalition for regional governor of Arica and Parinacota. He was elected in the second round with 54.46% of the vote, defeating incumbent governor Jorge Díaz Ibarra.

== Tenure as regional governor ==
Since assuming office in January 2025, Paco has focused his administration on public security, regional development and infrastructure.

During the first months of his term, he oversaw the installation of the Regional Council of Arica and Parinacota for the 2025–2029 period and held coordination meetings with mayors and public services to prioritize projects funded through the National Fund for Regional Development (FNDR).

In matters of security and border control, he has promoted closer coordination between the regional government and police forces, as well as investments in equipment and technology for prisons and border crossings in the region.

His administration has also emphasized the defense of the regional budget, representing the regional government before central government authorities and the National Congress of Chile. In this context, Paco appeared before the Senate Finance Committee to argue for the preservation of funding levels for the region, citing its territorial conditions and strategic importance.

== Electoral history ==
Year	Election	District	Coalition	Party	Votes	%	Result
2017	Regional councillor election	Parinacota Province	Chile Vamos	RN	410	16.7	Elected
2021	Parliamentary election (Deputy)	1st district	Chile Vamos	RN	6,749	8.39	Not elected
2024	Regional governor election (First round)	Arica and Parinacota Region	Chile Vamos	RN	43,462	32.55	Runoff
2024	Regional governor election(Second round)	Arica and Parinacota Region	Chile Vamos	RN	73,379	54.46	Elected
