= Parinacota, Chile =

Parinacota
- Hamlet
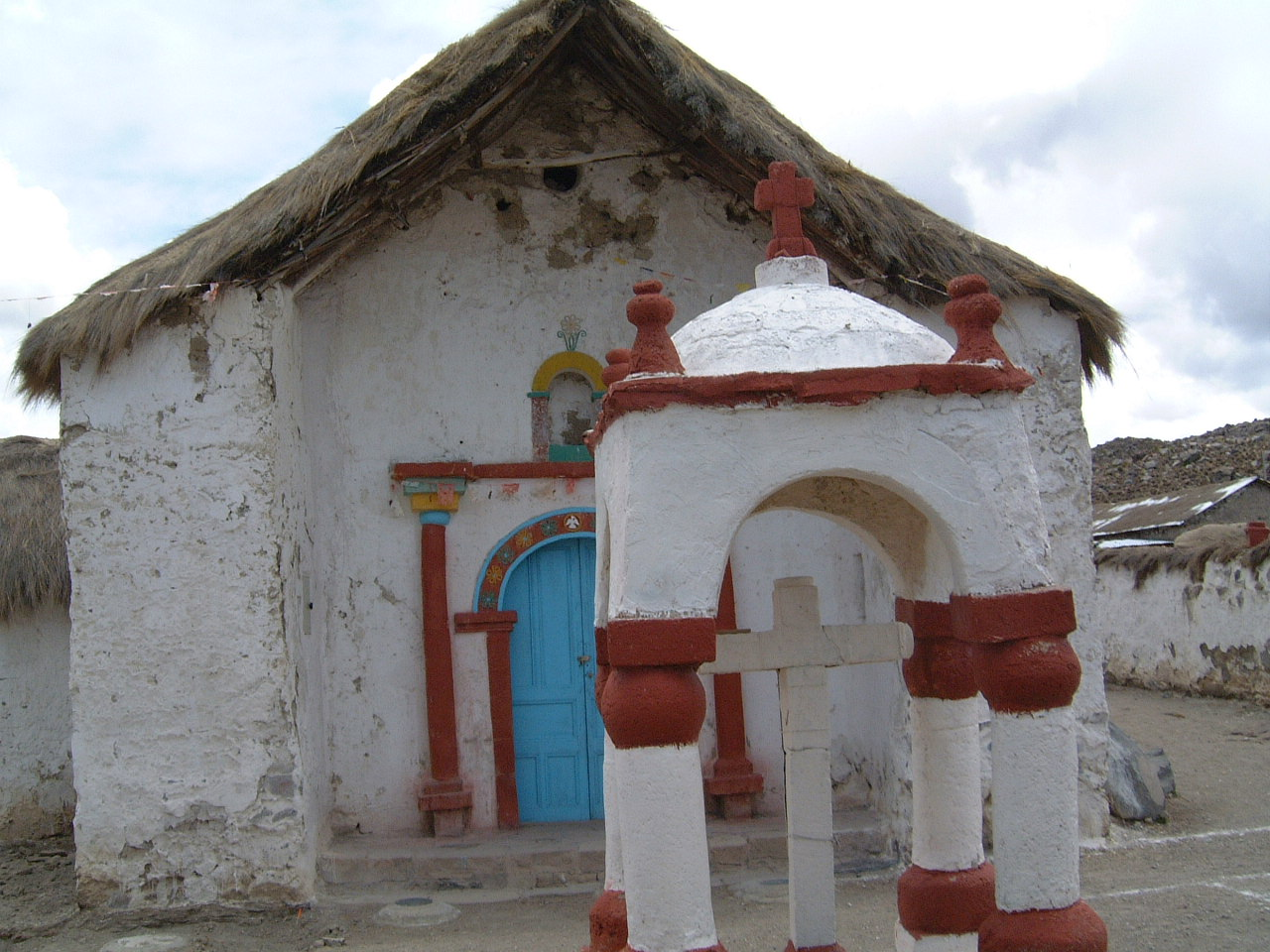
- Church at Parinacota

- Location in Chile Parinacota (Chile)
- Coordinates: 18.201856°S 69.268112°W
- Country: Chile
- Region: Arica y Parinacota
- Province: Parinacota
- Elevation: 4,400 m (14,400 ft)

Population (2012)
  - Total: 29
- Climate: ET

Parinacota is a Chilean hamlet in Putre, Parinacota Province, Arica and Parinacota Region.

== Location ==
It is situated on the highlands at an elevation of 4,400 metres (14,400 ft) in Lauca National Park near the small town of Putre and had 29 inhabitants as of 2002.

== Church ==
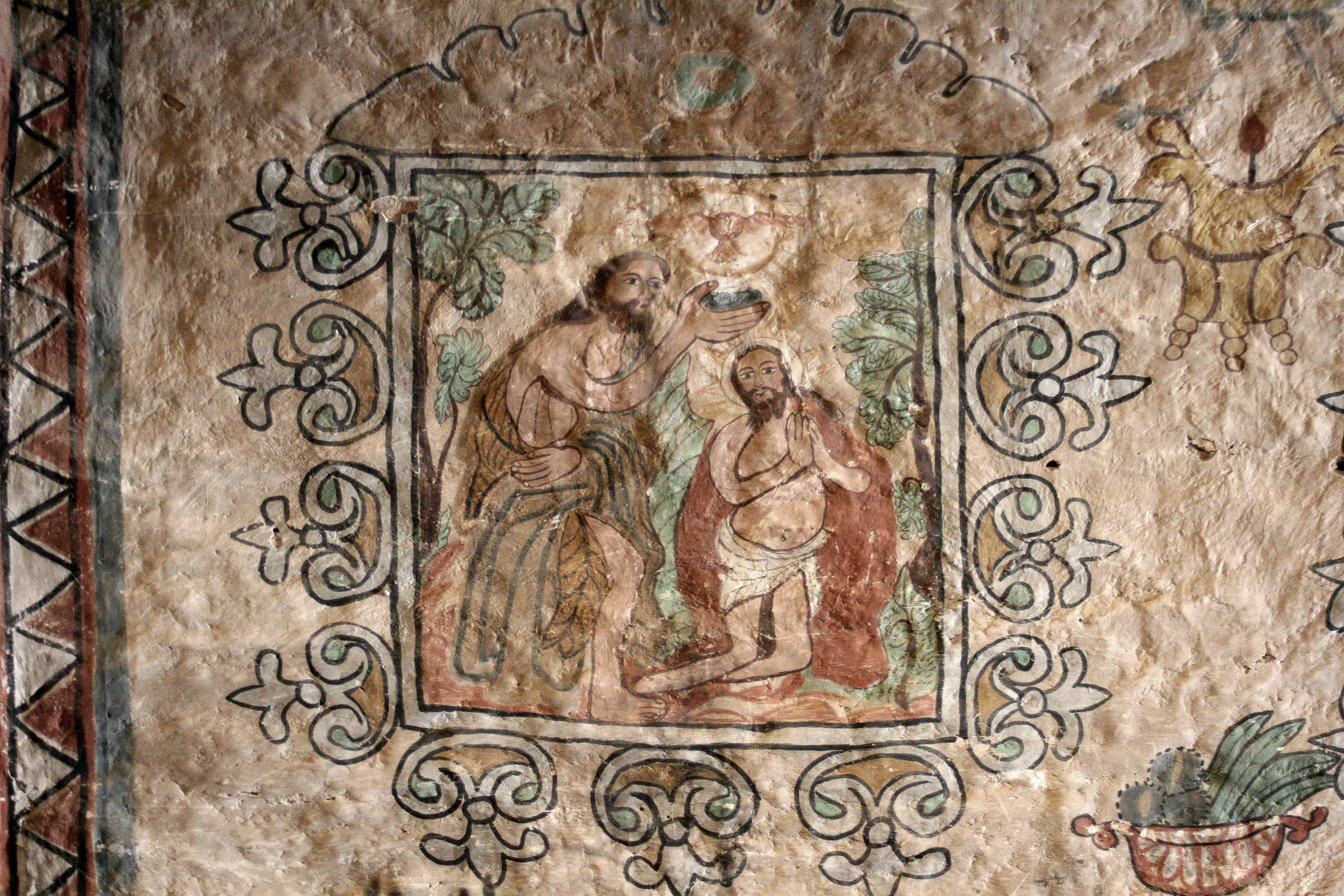
Fresque baptême

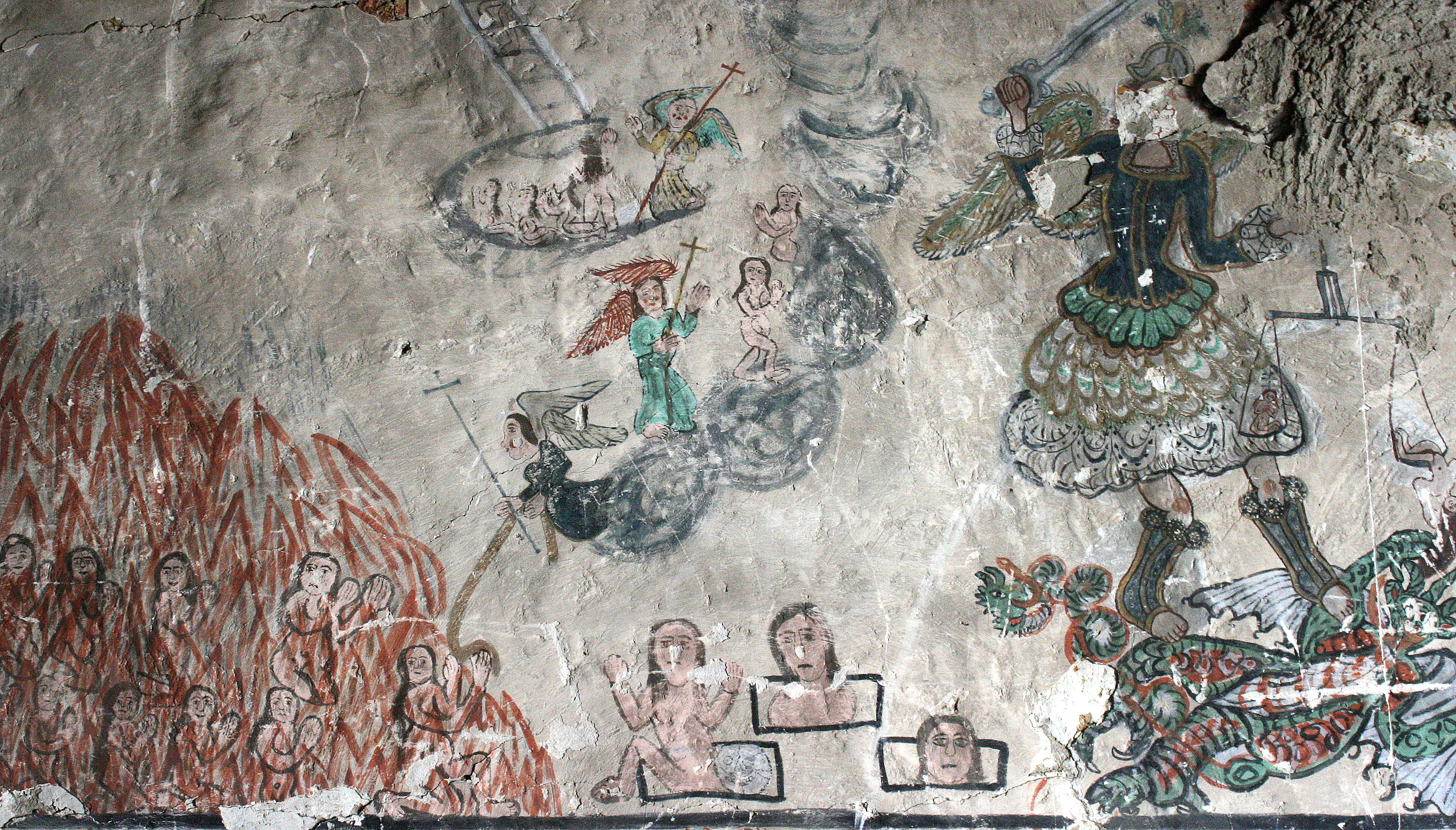
Fresque jugement dernier

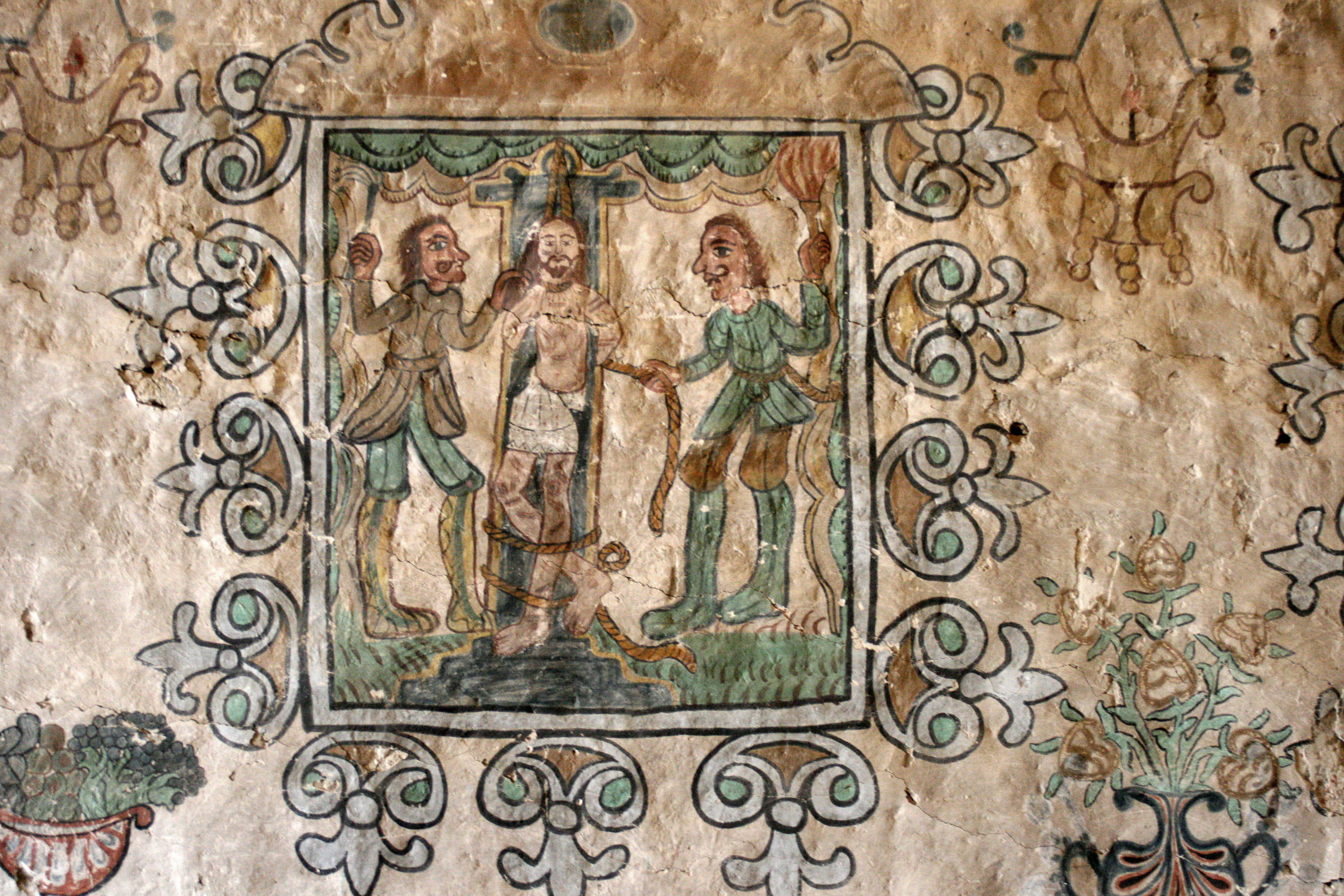
Fresque crucifixion

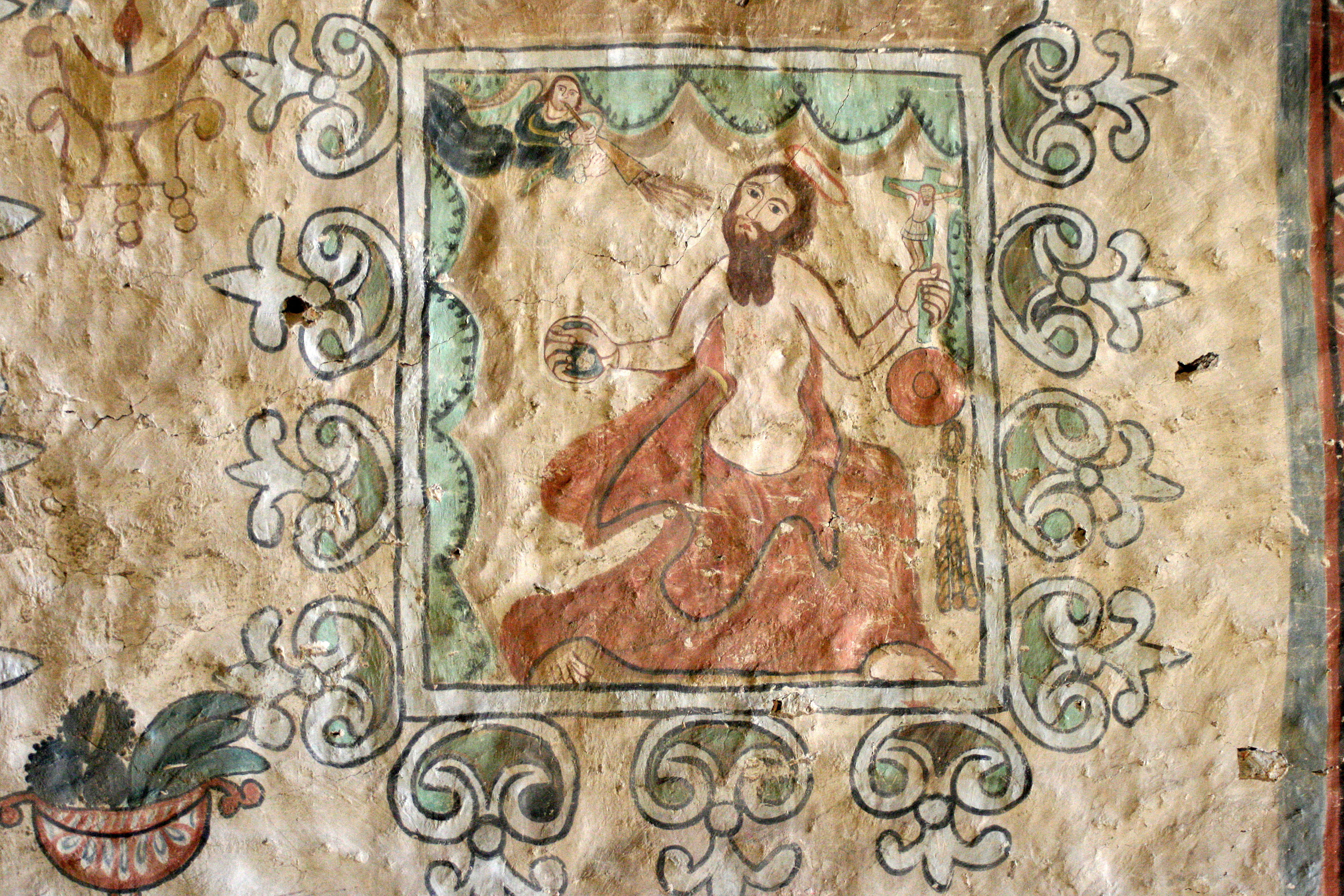
Fresque résurrection

The church was built in the 17th century in the form of a central nave with two side chapels. The walls are made of stone and clay and are supported by exterior arches of unmortared stone. The floor is brick with a central band of stone. Originally there was no choir. A choir without railing was built later-on whereas one of the most interesting frescoes of the area, the Last Judgment was destroyed. The atrium is surrounded by a clay wall on which are situated several figures made of red stone: A bishop, lilies, phalli and others. The square tower was rebuilt in 1789 and painted with white lime.

Noteworthy are the frescoes in the interior which were painted in water colors by Indians in the Andean baroque of the 17th century. The Last Judgment suggests that only women were condemned. The archangel St. Michael weighs a nude woman on a scale and there are trails to get to the purgatory, over clouds to heaven as well as stairs to the mouth of a dragon which leads to hell, where there are several torture instruments. The condemned women walk or are dragged by the hair or are ridden by demons. One of them leads the helpers of evil with a broad smile, not knowing what awaits her.

== Climate ==
Parinacota has an alpine climate (Köppen classification ETH). Due to its high elevation, there is high diurnal temperature variation. It has cool daily maxima throughout the year due to its high elevation, but minima are below freezing for the entire year, and frigid during the dry season from April to November. Precipitation is low and falls almost entirely between December and March: for the remainder of the year it totals just 20 millimetres or 0.8 inches over eight months.

Climate data for Parinacota
Month	Jan	Feb	Mar	Apr	May	Jun	Jul	Aug	Sep	Oct	Nov	Dec	Year
Mean daily maximum °C (°F)	13.5 (56.3)	13.1 (55.6)	13.0 (55.4)	12.7 (54.9)	10.8 (51.4)	9.3 (48.7)	8.8 (47.8)	10.2 (50.4)	11.3 (52.3)	13.3 (55.9)	13.9 (57.0)	13.9 (57.0)	12.0 (53.6)
Daily mean °C (°F)	5.4 (41.7)	5.4 (41.7)	4.8 (40.6)	3.5 (38.3)	1.3 (34.3)	−1.0 (30.2)	−1.1 (30.0)	−0.2 (31.6)	1.8 (35.2)	3.1 (37.6)	4.3 (39.7)	5.1 (41.2)	2.7 (36.8)
Mean daily minimum °C (°F)	−2.7 (27.1)	−2.2 (28.0)	−3.4 (25.9)	−5.7 (21.7)	−8.2 (17.2)	−11.2 (11.8)	−11.0 (12.2)	−10.5 (13.1)	−7.6 (18.3)	−7.1 (19.2)	−5.3 (22.5)	−3.7 (25.3)	−6.5 (20.2)
Average precipitation mm (inches)	103 (4.1)	90 (3.5)	54 (2.1)	7 (0.3)	0 (0)	2 (0.1)	1 (0.0)	1 (0.0)	2 (0.1)	2 (0.1)	5 (0.2)	33 (1.3)	300 (11.8)
Source: climate-data.org

== See also ==
- List of highest towns by country
