= Cosapilla =

Coordinates: 17°46′05″S 69°24′46″W

- Village
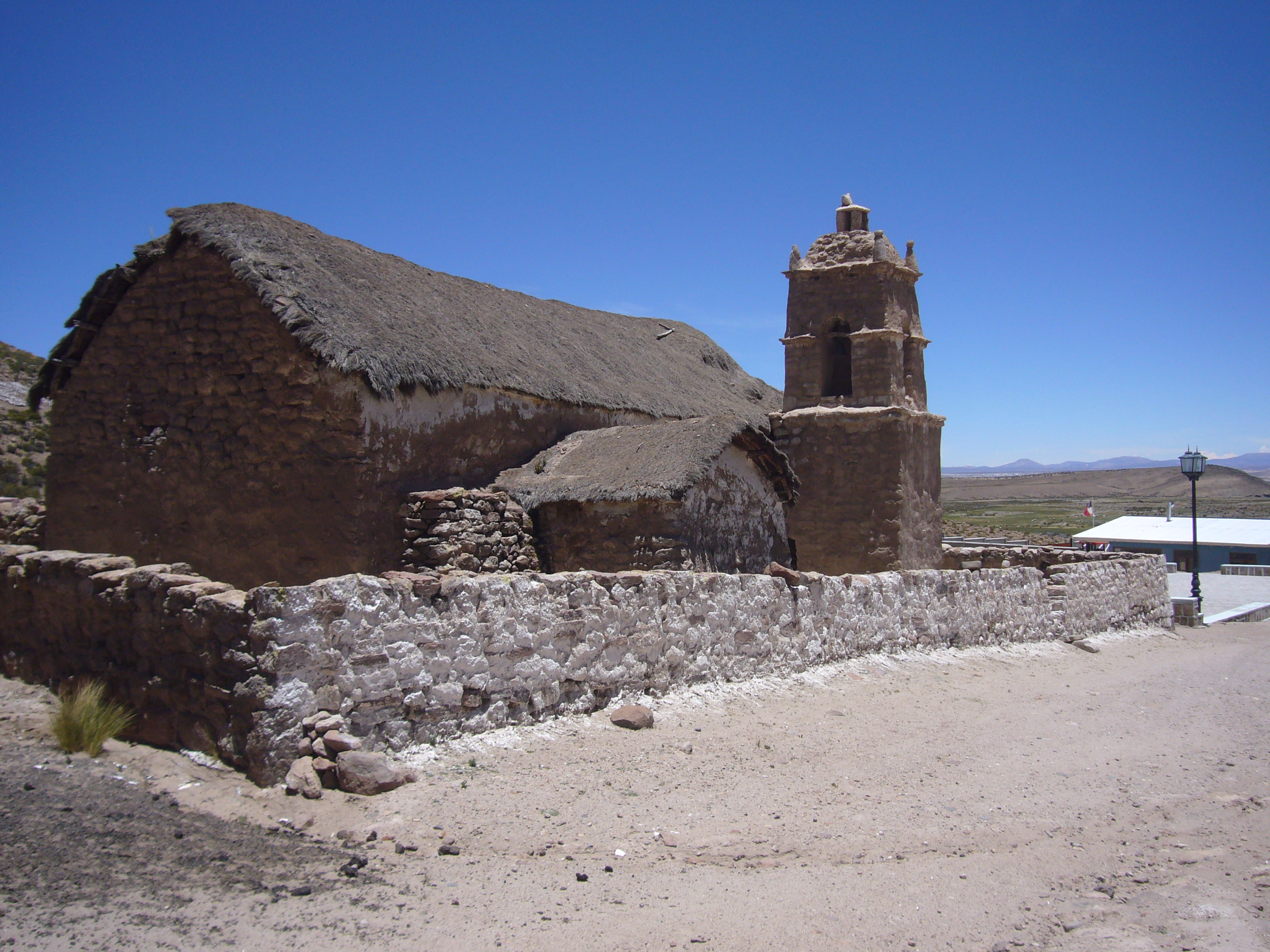
- Church with school in the background
- Interactive map of Cosapilla
- Country: Chile
- Region: Arica and Parinacota Region

Cosapilla is a village in the Arica and Parinacota Region, Chile.

There is a church with a cemetery and a Plaza in front of both. The other side of the plaza is taken up by the school.
