= General Lagos =

General Lagos Takura
- Commune
- Coat of arms Map of General Lagos commune in Arica and Parinacota Region Location in Chile
- Coordinates (commune): 17°52′S 69°35′W
- Country: Chile
- Region: Arica y Parinacota
- Province: Parinacota
- Named for: Pedro Lagos
- Capital: Visviri

Government
  - Type: Municipal council
  - Alcalde: Álex Castillo (REP)

Area
  - Total: 2,244.4 km^{2} (866.6 sq mi)
- Elevation: 4,093 m (13,428 ft)

Population (2017 Census)
  - Total: 684
  - Density: 0.305/km^{2} (0.789/sq mi)
  - Urban: 0
  - Rural: 684

Sex
  - Male: 412
  - Female: 272
- Time zone: UTC-4 (CLT)
  - Summer (DST): UTC-3 (CLST)
- Area code: 56 + 58
- Website: Municipality of General Lagos

General Lagos (indigenous name: Takura) is Chile's northernmost commune in Parinacota Province, Arica and Parinacota Region. Its capital is Visviri.

The area, once part of Peru, was captured by Chilean forces in the War of the Pacific by its namesake and commander of Chilean troops in the Battle of Arica, General Pedro Lagos.

Tacora volcano lies in this commune.

== Demographics ==
According to the 2002 census of the National Statistics Institute, General Lagos had 1,179 inhabitants (761 men and 418 women), all listed as living in rural areas. The population grew by 16.5% (167 persons) between the 1992 and 2002 censuses.

== Administration ==
As a commune, General Lagos is a third-level administrative division of Chile administered by a municipal council, headed by an alcalde who is directly elected every four years. The 2008-2012 alcalde was Gregorio Mendoza Chura.

Within the electoral divisions of Chile, General Lagos is represented in the Chamber of Deputies by Nino Baltolu (UDI) and Orlando Vargas (PPD) as part of the 1st electoral district, which includes the entire Arica and Parinacota Region. The commune is represented in the Senate by Fulvio Rossi Ciocca (PS) and Jaime Orpis Bouchon (UDI) as part of the 1st senatorial constituency (Arica and Parinacota Region and Tarapacá Region).
