= Tignamar =

Coordinates: 18°35′S 69°30′W

Ticnamar
- Village
- Interactive map of Ticnamar
- Country: Chile
- Region: Arica and Parinacota Region

Population (2002)
  - Total: 93

Tignamar is a village in the Arica and Parinacota Region, Chile.
