= Las Maitas =

Coordinates: 18°31′05″S 70°11′42″W

- Village
- Interactive map of Las Maitas
- Country: Chile
- Region: Arica and Parinacota Region

Las Maitas is a village in the Arica and Parinacota Region, Chile. In 2002, according to a national census, it had a population of 60 people: 30 men and 30 women.
