= Ancuta =

Coordinates: 18°27′01″S 69°12′04″W

- Village
- Interactive map of Ancuta
- Country: Chile
- Region: Arica and Parinacota Region

Arica and Parinacota in Chile

Ancuta is a village in the Arica and Parinacota Region, Chile.

It has a small colonial chapel.
