= Lluta River =

Coordinates: 18°24′55″S 70°19′35″W

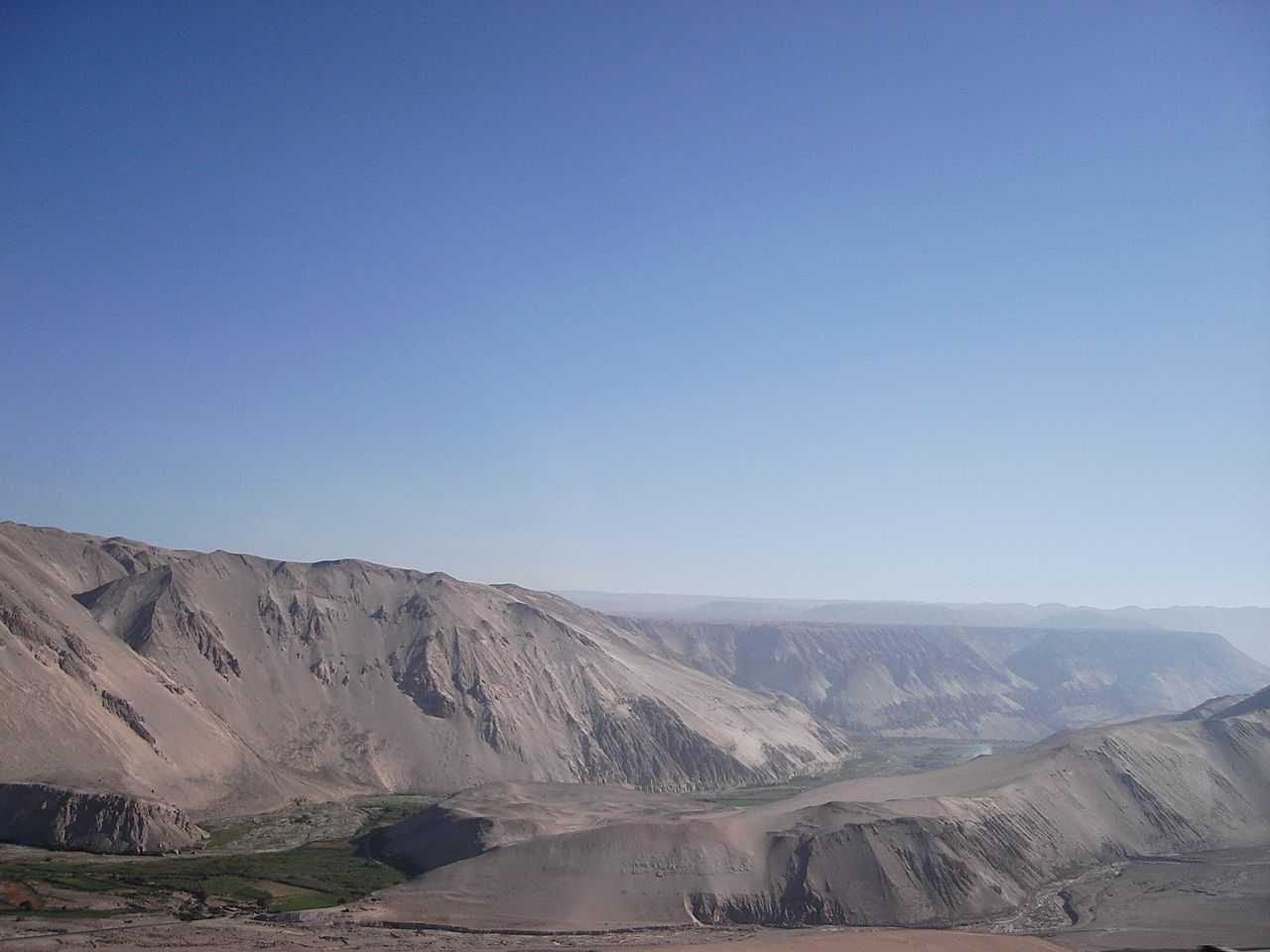
- Lluta Valley as seen from Chile Route 11

Location
- Country: Chile

Physical characteristics
- Source
  - elevation: 3,900 m (12,800 ft)
- Mouth
  - location: Pacific Ocean
- Length: 147 km (91 mi)
- Basin size: 3,400 km^{2} (1,300 sq mi)
- Discharge
  - average: 2.3 m^{3}/s (81 cu ft/s)

The Lluta River is a river located in the northern portion of the Arica y Parinacota Region of Chile. Its headwaters are on the western flanks of the Andes of the Parinacota Province, just a few kilometers south of the border with Peru, and empties into the Pacific Ocean at the village of Villa Frontera, about 4 km north of the city of Arica.

== Course ==
The Lluta originates at the confluence of the Quebrada Caracarani (which rises from the slopes of the Tacora volcano) and the Azufre River, at an elevation about 3,900 m asl. Along its first 36 km, the river flows southeast and then slowly begins to turn towards the west. In its descent to the lower elevations of the valley, the river starts to run through a canyon carved by the same river in rhyolite tuffs and other sediments scarcely joined.

In the vicinity of Socoroma, the river turns directly west and just past the canyon terminus, the river begins to widen. In Chironta, about 70 km from the sea, appear the first farms, whose foods are of a great importance for the consume of local people. Finally, the river empties into Pacific Ocean at an extensive beach, just a few kilometers north of Arica.

The hydrologic regime of the river basin is rain-dominated. The increase of its water volume occurs mainly in January and February, as a consequence of the phenomenon known as Bolivian Winter.

Under the Chilean proposal of 1975 to resolve the Atacama border dispute, the Lluta River would have become the northern border of Chile, and Bolivia would control the narrow strip between the river and the southern border of Peru.

== Water quality ==
Apart from its problems of salinity and acidity, the river has very elevated levels of boron, arsenic, and sulfate, among other pollutants, which restricts the agricultural activities that can be developed along the river banks. The river water is used only for irrigation of pastureland and crops which tolerate poor water quality, such as onions and potatoes.
