= Chile Route 11 =

Major road in Chile

Route 11
- Ruta 11

Location
- Country: Chile

Highway system
- Highways in Chile

Chile Route 11 (Ruta 11 CH) is a main road in the northernmost portion of Chile. It runs east for 192.25 km (119.46 mi) from Chile Route 5 at a roundabout in Villa Frontera, Arica Province to Chungará–Tambo Quemado. The route serves as the main access to Quebrada de Cardones Natural Monument and Lauca National Park.

The western portion of the road stretches along the valley floor of the lower course of the Lluta River. At higher elevations, the road winds through a highly mountainous area.
