= Poconchile =

Coordinates: 18°27′06″S 70°04′01″W

- Village
- Interactive map of Poconchile
- Country: Chile
- Region: Arica and Parinacota Region

Poconchile is a village in the Arica and Parinacota Region, Chile.
