= Villa Frontera =

Coordinates: 18°23′57″S 70°18′53″W

- Village
- Interactive map of Villa Frontera
- Country: Chile
- Region: Arica y Parinacota
- Province: Arica

Villa Frontera, also identified as Chacalluta, is a village within the Arica Province of the Arica and Parinacota Region, Chile.

== Location ==
Villa Frontera is on the Pacific Ocean coast and on the northern bank of the Lluta River. It is the northernmost settlement along the Chilean coast before the border with Peru (the name Villa Frontera means frontier town in English). The Playa Las Machas beach stretches south from the village to the town of Arica.

== Demographics and economy ==
Between the 2002 and 2017 census, the population grew from 370 to 870. As a location close to the border control with good road links to the rest of Chile, a substantial warehousing area has developed to the east of the village.

== Transport ==
The village is at the junction of Chile Route 5, part of the Pan-American highway, and the western terminus of Chile Route 11. Chacalluta International Airport sits between the village and the Peruvian border. Arica, 6km to the south, is the nearest ocean harbour. The Tacna-Arica Railway passes through the village however there is no station and in 2012 the line ceased operation.
