= Esquiña =

Coordinates: 18°56′08″S 69°31′48″W

- Village
- Interactive map of Esquiña
- Country: Chile
- Region: Arica and Parinacota Region

Esquiña is a village in the Arica and Parinacota Region, Chile.
