= Chitita =

Coordinates: 18°49′33″S 69°40′51″W

- Village
- Interactive map of Chitita
- Country: Chile
- Region: Arica and Parinacota Region

Chitita is a village in the Arica and Parinacota Region, Chile. It has a church that was on the Chilean tentative list for submission to the 1998 UNESCO World Heritage List.
