= Putre =

Town and commune in Chile

- Town and Commune
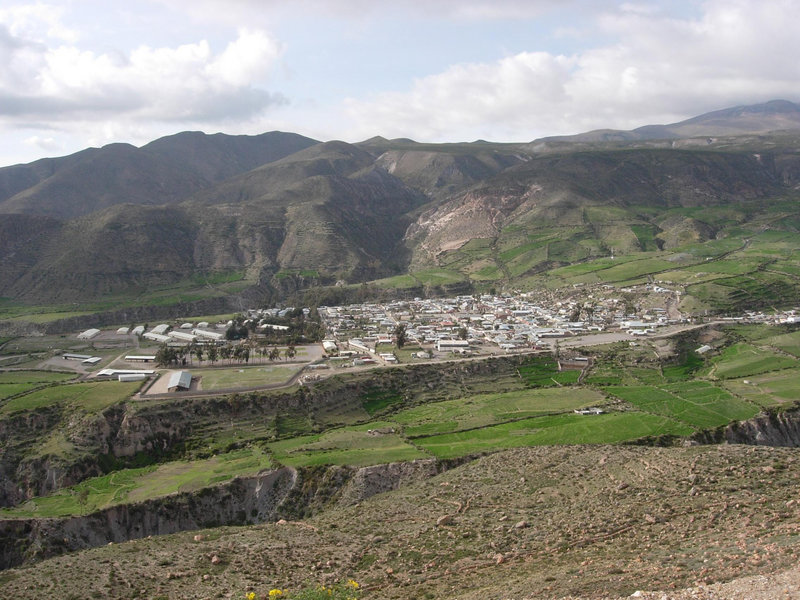
- Panoramic view of Putre

- Flag Coat of arms Map of Putre commune in Arica and Parinacota Region Location within Arica y Parinacota Location within Chile
- Coordinates (city): 18°11′49″S 69°33′34″W
- Country: Chile
- Region: Arica y Parinacota
- Province: Parinacota
- Founded: 1580
- Seat: Putre

Government
  - Type: Municipal council
  - Alcalde: Javier Tito

Area
  - Town and Commune: 5,902.5 km^{2} (2,279.0 sq mi)
- Elevation: 3,371 m (11,060 ft)

Population (2017 Census)
  - Town and Commune: 2,765
  - Density: 0.4684/km^{2} (1.213/sq mi)
  - Urban: 2,152
  - Rural: 613
- Demonym: Putreño / a

Sex
  - Male: 2,054
  - Female: 711
- Time zone: UTC-4 (CLT)
  - Summer (DST): UTC-3 (CLST)
- Area code: 56 + 58
- Climate: ET
- Website: Official website (in Spanish)

Putre is a Chilean town and commune, capital of the Parinacota Province in the Arica-Parinacota Region. It is located 130 km (81 mi) east of Arica, at an altitude of 3,500 m (11,483 ft). The town is backdropped by Taapaca volcanic complex.

Putre is on the edge of the Lauca National Park, and is popular with visitors to the National Park wishing to acclimatise to the altitude.

There is a historical church in Putre.

The commune also includes the localities of Socoroma, Tignamar, Belén, Chapiquiña, Pachama, Ancuta, Guallatire, Parinacota, Chucuyo and Caquena.

On March 6, 2011, a 6.2 magnitude earthquake centered 110 km (68 mi) beneath Putre shook northern Chile and southern Peru, causing no injuries and only minor damage.

== Climate ==
According to the Köppen climate classification, Putre has an alpine climate (ETH) bordering on a cool semi-arid climate (BSk).

Climate data for Putre (1976–2009)
Month	Jan	Feb	Mar	Apr	May	Jun	Jul	Aug	Sep	Oct	Nov	Dec	Year
Mean daily maximum °C (°F)	14.5 (58.1)	14.8 (58.6)	15.1 (59.2)	16.1 (61.0)	15.6 (60.1)	14.8 (58.6)	14.2 (57.6)	15.2 (59.4)	15.7 (60.3)	16.1 (61.0)	15.9 (60.6)	15.4 (59.7)	15.3 (59.5)
Daily mean °C (°F)	9.2 (48.6)	9.4 (48.9)	9.8 (49.6)	9.1 (48.4)	8.1 (46.6)	7.5 (45.5)	8.6 (47.5)	8.9 (48.0)	9.3 (48.7)	9.3 (48.7)	9.5 (49.1)	9.3 (48.7)	9.0 (48.2)
Mean daily minimum °C (°F)	3.9 (39.0)	3.9 (39.0)	3.7 (38.7)	3.5 (38.3)	2.5 (36.5)	1.4 (34.5)	0.7 (33.3)	1.9 (35.4)	2.2 (36.0)	2.5 (36.5)	3.1 (37.6)	3.2 (37.8)	2.7 (36.9)
Average precipitation mm (inches)	155 (6.1)	97 (3.8)	28 (1.1)	1 (0.0)	1 (0.0)	1 (0.0)	1 (0.0)	2 (0.1)	2 (0.1)	2 (0.1)	18 (0.7)	68 (2.7)	376 (14.7)
Source: Atlas Agroclimatico de Chile

== Demographics ==
According to the 2002 census of the National Statistics Institute, Putre had 1,977 inhabitants (1,345 men and 632 women). Of these, 1,235 (62.5%) lived in urban areas and 742 (38.5%) in rural areas. The population fell by 29.5% (826 persons) between the 1992 and 2002 censuses.

== Administration ==
As a commune, Putre is a third-level administrative division of Chile administered by a municipal council, headed by a mayor (alcalde) who is directly elected every four years. Since August 2023 the mayor has been Javier Tito Huaylla (Ind./UDI), who was elected by the communal council following the former mayor Maricel Gutiérrez Castro (Ind.) died in July 2023. The communal council has the following members:

- Juan Manuel Muñoz Cabrera (UDI)
- Jeannette Huanca Huanca (Ind./UDI)
- María Aria Santos (Ind./UDI)
- Marcos Jiménez Mamani (Ind./PR)
- Edie Zegarra Santos (Ind./PPD)
- Herman Gutiérrez Coloma (Ind./PPD)

Within the electoral divisions of Chile, Putre is represented in the Chamber of Deputies by Mr. Nino Baltolu (UDI) and Mr. Orlando Vargas (PPD) as part of the 1st electoral district, which includes the entire Arica and Parinacota Region.The commune is represented in the Senate by Fulvio Rossi Ciocca (PS) and Jaime Orpis Bouchon (UDI) as part of the 1st senatorial constituency (Arica and Parinacota Region and Tarapacá Region).
