= Manuel Villavicencio =

Peruvian Navy officer (1842–1925)

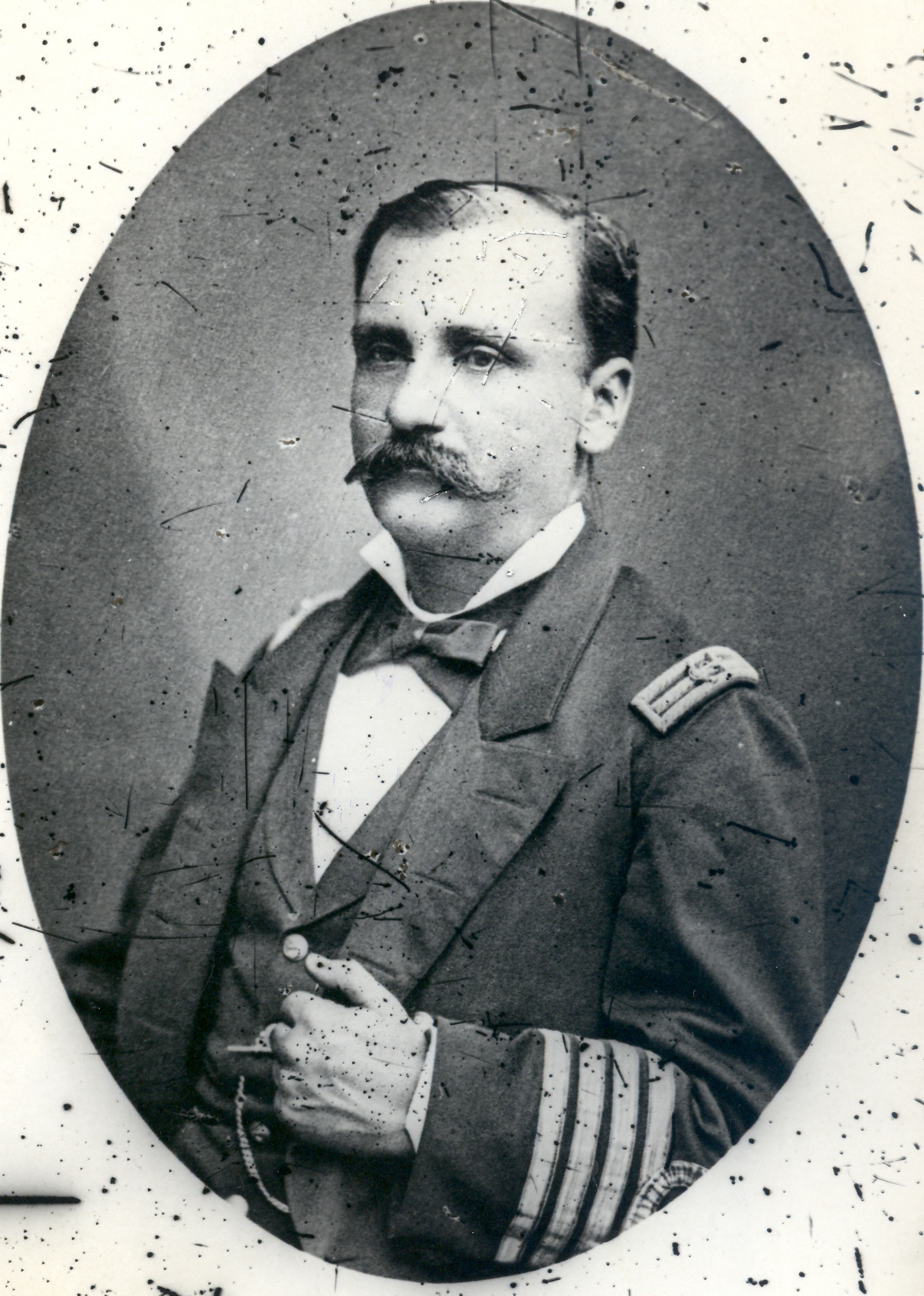

Member of the Senate
- In office 12 October 1924 – 20 December 1925
- Constituency: El Callao

Member of the Senate
- In office 28 July 1886 – 25 November 1886
- Constituency: Ancash

Personal details
- Born: Manuel Antonio Villavicencio Freyre; 13 July 1834 Lima, Peru
- Died: 20 December 1925 (aged 91)
- Spouse(s): María Ayllón; Carmen Coronel Zegarra

Military service
- Branch/service: Peruvian Navy
- Rank: Vice admiral

Manuel Antonio Villavicencio Freyre (13 June 1842 – 20 December 1925) was a prominent Peruvian Navy officer, who participated in the War of the Pacific. He also served as a Senator.

== Biography ==
=== Military career ===
He was the son of Manuel Villavicencio and Juana Freyre.

After completing his studies at the Colegio Peruano-Francés, he entered the Peruvian Naval School on August 1, 1855, when he was only 13 years old.

Upon completing his studies, he graduated with the class of midshipman on July 29, 1857, being embarked on the war steamer Izcuchaca. Later he would embark on various units of the Squadron. On March 30, 1858, he was assigned to the frigate Apurímac, with which he participated in the expedition to Ecuador in 1859 and 1860. Specifically, he participated in the blockade of Guayaquil, under the orders of Rear Admiral Ignacio Mariátegui y Tellería.

On August 6, 1861, he was assigned to the frigate Arica, rising in December of that same year to the rank of frigate lieutenant. For his support of the restorative revolution of 1865, which brought Mariano Ignacio Prado to power, he was successively promoted to second lieutenant and first lieutenant.

On May 21, 1865, he was assigned to the Chalaco, whose function was the transport of troops, weapons and provisions. Due to being on a commission trip to Guayaquil, he was unable to act in the battle of Callao on May 2, 1866.

In 1871 he passed command of the war steamer Mayro, with which he was stationed in Arica, remaining stationed in the south. He was there when the coup d'état of the colonels Gutiérrez took place, and Miguel Grau himself went to look for him there so that he would sign his support for the Navy protest manifesto. He was then promoted to corvette captain in November 1873 and frigate captain in June 1876.

In 1879 he was promoted to captain. When the War of the Pacific broke out between Peru and Chile, he resumed command of the Chalaco, with the mission of transporting troops and supplies to the battle fronts in the south, and of transferring from Panama the weapons acquired with great sacrifices, performing with value and efficiency in all the commissions entrusted to him. The Chalaco was a ship without armor and without artillery.

After the naval campaign in October 1879, President Prado gave him command of the corvette Unión, aboard which he would carry out his most resounding feat: the double rupture of the blockade from Arica.

=== Double breaking of the blockade of Arica ===
At dawn on March 17, 1880 on the shores of the port of Arica, the Unión managed to evade the vigilance of three enemy ships: the armored Cochrane, the monitor Huáscar and the Amazonas artillery transport. With the lights off, sailing recklessly close to the coast, the corvette Unión slipped into the interior of the roadstead and docked in the bay next to the monitor Manco Cápac. Sheltered by the Morro de Arica cannons, the "Union" carried out the unloading operations for eight hours.

The Cochrane and the Amazonas joined the Huáscar (former Peruvian monitor, captured by the Chileans), and opened fire on the Unión and on the monitor Manco Cápac during the morning and until four in the afternoon. The Chilean command assumed that the corvette Unión was disabled because it had suffered the impact of 48 cannon shots. However, after the unloading was over and when it was past five in the afternoon, Commander Villavicencio decided to set sail at full force to the south.

Unfortunately, the discharge of the supposed aid to the forces of the south that were fighting in Arica, was not what was expected, generating confusion in the troops and officers, once again politics was more important than the homeland.

Amid the cheers of the population and circumventing for the second time the blockade of the enemy ships, who thought that it was heading north, the corvette entered the sea. Surprised, the Chilean ships began the pursuit of the "Unión", but had to abandon it when night came.

As a result of his feat, the Peruvian sailor received the Steel Cross that the Peruvian government of Nicolás de Piérola had created to reward the merit of its soldiers and sailors. He was promoted to Sea Captain.

On January 17, 1881, after the occupation of Lima, Villavicencio gave the order to sink the corvette Unión, thus preventing it from falling into enemy hands.

He moved to the south to collaborate with the government of Francisco García Calderón. He was successively prefect of Ica (1881), Cuzco (1882) and Arequipa (1883). He was also Minister of War and Navy in the government of Lizardo Montero installed in Arequipa, a function that ended with the installation of the government of Miguel Iglesias in Lima, in 1883.

=== Post-war career ===
He supported General Andrés Avelino Cáceres in his fight against Miguel Iglesias, a ruler execrated by the population for having signed the peace of Ancón with Chile, with territorial transfer. Triumphant the cacerista revolution in 1885, he was appointed commander of the steam Santa Rosa. In 1886 he was elected Senator for Ancash.

He was General Commander of the Navy; Director of the Peruvian Naval School; Minister of War and Navy (1893 and 1902-1903); and president of the Superior Council of General Officers (1906). In 1894 he was promoted to rear admiral and in 1912 to vice admiral.

In 1912 he traveled to Europe on a commission trip. In 1925 he was elected Senator for El Callao. He died on December 20 of that year, being buried in the Crypt of the Heroes of the Presbítero Matías Maestro Cemetery.
