= José Sánchez Lagomarsino =

Peruvian Navy personnel

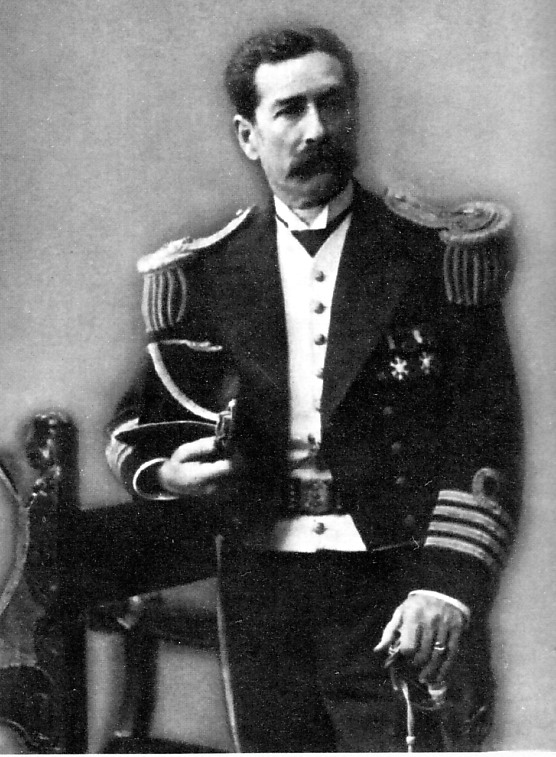
- Born: José María Sánchez Lagomarsino; 27 March 1844; Cajamarca, Peru
- Died: 19 March 1898 (aged 53); Chosica, Peru
- Military career
- Allegiance: Peru
- Branch: Peruvian Navy
- Service years: 1858-1895
- Rank: Captain
- Conflicts: Chincha Islands War; Battle of Callao; War of the Pacific; Battle of Punta Gruesa; Naval Battle of Arica; Battle of Arica

José María Sánchez Lagomarsino (27 March 1844 – 19 March 1898) was a captain of the Peruvian Navy, who fought during the War of the Pacific.

Lagomarsino was the commander of the Peruvian monitor Manco Cápac and he is mostly known for his defence of Arica during the Blockade of Arica which included a victory in the Naval Battle of Arica against the Chilean ironclad Huáscar.

Arica would fall during the Battle of Arica which lead to Lagomarsino scuttling Manco Cápac to avoid it falling into Chilean hands.
