= Naval Battle of Arica =

Naval engagements during the War of the Pacific

- Part of Blockade of Arica of the War of the Pacific
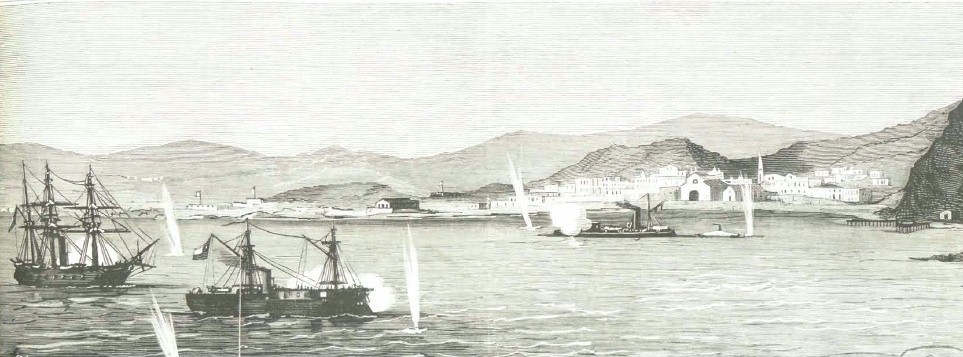
- The Peruvian monitor "Manco Capac" against the Chilean ships "Huascar" and "Magallanes".
Date	Friday, 27 February 1880
Location	Arica, Peru (now Chile)
Result	Peruvian victory

Belligerents
Chile	Peru

Commanders and leaders
Manuel Thomson †; Carlos Condell	Camilo Carrillo; José Lagomarsino

Strength
1 Monitor: Huáscar; 1 Gunboat: Magallanes	1 Monitor: Manco Cápac; Arica land defences: 5 batteries with 13 guns of different calibers

Casualties and losses
9 killed 18 wounded	3 killed 4 wounded 5 civilians killed

The Naval Battle of Arica (Spanish: Combate naval de Arica) was a naval battle which took place on 27 February 1880 during the Blockade of Arica as part of the War of the Pacific.

== Background ==
The blockade of Arica was conducted by the Chilean navy's ships Cochrane, Covadonga, and an unnamed armed transport, all three having arrived by the 7th of December, 1879. The town of Arica was relatively well defended, with four batteries including one on a bluff, the other three built of sand and turf. Several foreign ships observed during the blockade, including corvettes from the US, France, and the UK.

On 27 February, the Chilean Navy began bombarding the city's ground defenses. These defenses had a range of 3.5 km, providing a large covering zone for the remaining Peruvian ironclad, the Manco Cápac. The now Chilean warship Huáscar, after its capture at the Battle of Angamos, had been sent for repairs and fitted with two 40 lb Armstrong type guns, with a firing range between 6 and 7 km. The ironclad was put under the command of Captain Manuel Thomson. The Huáscar arrived in Arica on 25 February in order to take the place of the warship Almirante Cochrane in the port blockade as the Cochrane was needed to escort transports. Later the Magallanes, led by Captain Carlos Condell arrived to join the Huáscar in the operation.

== Battle ==
The battle itself consists of three separate engagements all taking place on the same day.

=== Initial Engagement ===
At 8:30 am, the Huáscar approached the coast, near the island of Alacrán, to reconnoitre the state of the forts that defended the port of Arica. As a result of this approach, the Peruvian defences of the Morro de Arica, under the command of Colonel Arnaldo Panizo, opened fire on the Huáscar, joined by the monitor Manco Cápac. On the Chilean side, the Magallanes gunboat is also involved, which at the beginning of the engagement was 6 miles north of the port, producing an exchange of fire that lasts until 9:20 a.m. As a result of this cannonade, the Huáscar receives 3 hits without consequences.

=== Attack on supply train ===
At 11:00 a.m., the lookouts of the Chilean ships spot a train coming from Tacna heading to Arica, so for the second time the Huáscar and the Magallanes approach the coast to cannonade the train. Again, combat was engaged with the Peruvian defences, including the batteries located on the beach. The Huáscar receives a direct hit that exploded next to the cannon of the port fortress, killing 8 servants and injuring 12 others. Among the fatal casualties, were the aspirant Eulogio Goycolea and the sailor Luis Segundo Ugarte, who was one of the sailors on the Esmeralda that tried to board the Huáscar in the combat on May 21 in Iquique. Huáscar's second commander, 1st Lieutenant Emilio Valverde, and 2nd Lieutenant Tomás Pérez, were wounded. Another strong grenade hit the forearm, causing severe damage. The Huascar retired and together with the Magallanes, took their usual position in the lock.

=== Naval battle ===
At around 1:00 pm, the monitor Manco Cápac, commanded by the frigate captain José Sánchez Lagomarsino, lifts pressure and leaves the bay at 1:15 pm in the direction of Huáscar. Among the crew of the Peruvian monitor, was captain Juan Guillermo More, who came as a volunteer.

An hour later, Commander Manuel Thomson orders an attack on the Peruvian monitor without initial consequences given the distance of 3,200m. At 2:30 pm, when the Manco Cápac was at 1800m, it opened fire but is weakened because one of its two guns got struck. During the combat the Huascar engine fails and the ship is immobilised. The Peruvians noticed this and concentrated fire on the immobile ship. A projectile from the Manco Cápac hits the chest of Commander Thomson who was on the poop deck, killing him instantly. The shot also knocked over a mast and destroyed the signal code. In the meantime, the engineers managed to get the engine back into operation, so Lieutenant Valverde removed the ship from the line of fire and Captain José Sánchez Lagomarsino ordered the return of Manco Cápac to the port at 3:30 pm, where it anchored at 4:30 pm.

Captain Condell assumed command of Huáscar and the command of the blockade, and sent Magallanes to Ilo to notify Commander General of the Squadron, Rear Admiral Galvarino Riveros Cárdenas and the Minister of War and Navy Rafael Sotomayor of Thomson's death.

== Aftermath ==
Arica was later taken by Chile in the Battle of Arica, in June, after the town had been weakened by the blockade, which prevented supply from the sea; important in the desert region.
