= Manuel Thomson =

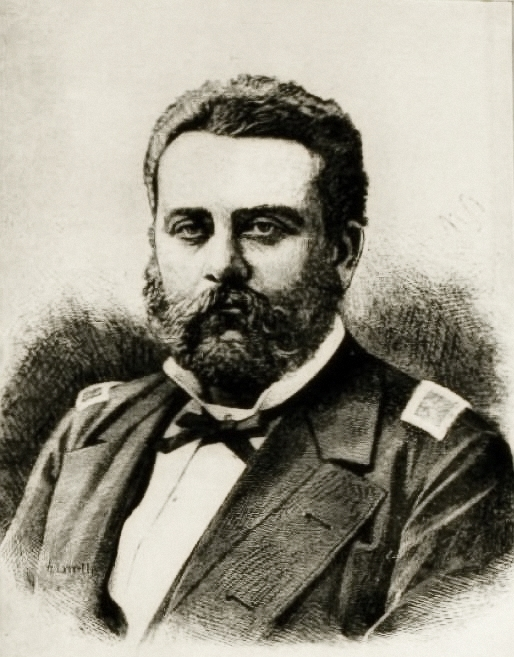
- Born: Manuel Tomás Thomson Porto Mariño; 3 November 1839; Valparaíso, Chile
- Died: 27 February 1880 (aged 40); Arica, Peru (now Chile)
- Education: Escuela Militar del Libertador Bernardo O'Higgins
- Military career
- Allegiance: Chile
- Branch: Chilean Navy
- Service years: 1851–1880
- Rank: Frigate captain
- Conflicts: Chincha Islands War; Battle of Pisagua; War of the Pacific; Naval Battle of Arica †

Manuel Tomás Thomson Porto Mariño (3 November 1839 – 27 February 1880) was a Chilean Navy officer who served in the War of the Pacific. Thomson was given command of the ironclad vessel Huáscar following its capture by Chile during the Battle of Angamos. Thomson then took the ship to Arica in order to bombard and blockade the city. While at Arica the Huáscar fought a duel with the Peruvian monitor Manco Cápac, known as the Naval Battle of Arica, during which Thomson was killed.

The Chilean submarine Thomson (SS-20) is named after him.
