= Caleta Vítor =

Coordinates: 18°47′07″S 70°20′10″W

- Village
- Interactive map of Caleta Vítor
- Country: Chile
- Region: Arica and Parinacota Region

Caleta Vítor is a village in the Arica and Parinacota Region, Chile.

Archaeological research discovered that the Caleta Vitor area was already inhabited about 10,000 years ago.
