= Camilo Carrillo =

Peruvian military officer

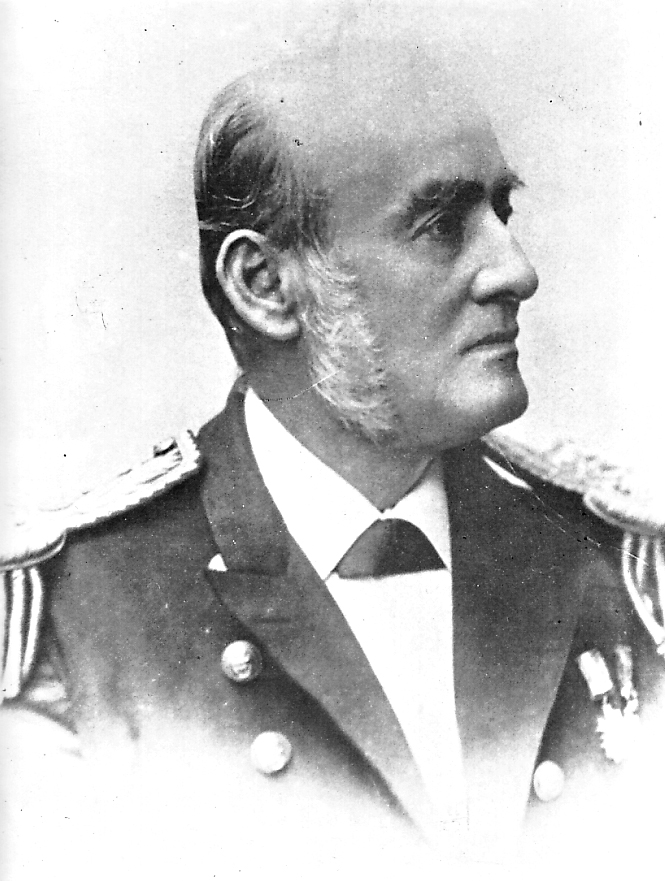
- Born: Camilo Nicanor Carrillo Martínez; 15 December 1830; Paita, Peru
- Died: 7 May 1901 (aged 70); Lima, Peru
- Education: National University of San Marcos
- Spouse: Francisca del Valle
- Military career
- Allegiance: Peru
- Branch: Peruvian Navy
- Service years: 1847-1881
- Rank: Captain
- Commands: Commander of the 3rd Naval Division (1879); Commander of the Batteries of Miraflores (1881)
- Conflicts: Chincha Islands War; Battle of Callao; War of the Pacific; Naval Battle of Arica; Battle of Miraflores

Camilo Nicanor Carrillo Martínez (15 December 1830 – 7 May 1901) was a Peruvian Navy officer and politician. He served in the Peruvian blockade of Bolivia in 1853 and commanded the Loa in the 1866 Battle of Callao during the Chincha Islands War with Spain. He served as minister of finance and commerce in 1870-71 and in 1873-74 before being elected to the Chamber of Deputies, of which he served as president from 1878. Carrillo returned to naval command during the War of the Pacific before becoming minister of war and the navy, serving in 1880 and 1899.

== Early life and naval career ==
Camilo Nicanor Carrillo Martínez was born in Paita on 15 December 1830. His father, of the same name, was a colonel in the cavalry of the Peruvian Army who joined the 1835 rebellion of Felipe Santiago Salaverry against president Luis José de Orbegoso. Salaverry was defeated by a Bolivian army, sent with the agreement of Orbegoso and the senior Carrillo was executed in 1836.

After studying at the Convictorio de San Carlos Carrillo junior joined the Peruvian Navy as a midshipman in 1847. He served aboard the steam vessel Rimac in 1850 and the brig Gamarra in 1851. During the Bolivian–Peruvian territorial dispute of 1853 Carrillo served in the Peruvian blockade of Bolivia. He was promoted to second lieutenant in 1854 and appointed to command the Panama. He retired on health grounds in 1856 but rejoined in 1859 as an instructor at the Military College, whilst also teaching mathematics at the Universidad Nacional Mayor de San Marcos.

Carrillo was promoted to first lieutenant in 1860 and later supervised the construction of river steamers. He served as second in command of the Morona steamer in the Peruvian Amazonia and was promoted to lieutenant commander by 1865, the same year he served as secretary to a boundary commission with Brazil. During the Chincha Islands War with Spain Carrillo commanded the Loa at the 2 May 1866 Battle of Callao. Later that year he was given command of the corvette Unión. Promoted to frigate captain in 1867 he was given command of the Independencia and then became port captain at Huanchaco. In 1868 he was sent to New Orelans, United States, to bring the river monitors Manco Cápac and Atahualpa to Peru, a risky, but successful, journey that took 16 months.

== Politics and later life ==
Carrillo was appointed Minister of Finance and Commerce by Peruvian President José Balta in July 1870 and remained in post until 20 September 1871. Carrillo married in 1871 to Francisca del Valle Solís. In 1872 he headed a commission looking into a possible Pacific-Atlantic canal. He remained a naval officer and in 1873 received promotion to full captain. On 7 November 1873 he returned to the role of Minister of Finance and Commerce, serving under president Manuel Pardo until 26 May 1874. Carrillo afterwards became director of the Naval Academy. In 1876 he was elected to the Chamber of Deputies, representing the province of Lower Amazonas. He was elected president of the chamber on 27 July 1878. Carillo returned to the naval academy as director in February 1879.

During the War of the Pacific with Chile Carrillo commanded the third Peruvian naval division before being appointed to command the coastal defence batteries at Arica. He was recalled to Lima in April 1880 and commanded its defences until appointed president of the council of ministers and minister of war and the navy in the provisional government of Francisco García Calderón. The war ended in Chilean victory.

Carrillo became head director general of the post office in 1895 and was appointed again as minister of war and the navy on 8 September 1899 by Eduardo López de Romaña, serving until 2 December when he returned to the post office. He was also a vice president and founding member of the Geographical Society of Lima and a member of the Society of Founders of Peruvian Independence. He died of arteriosclerosis at home in Lima on 7 May 1901. He was buried in the Presbítero Maestro Cemetery on 9 May.
