= Parinacota Province =

Parinacota Province Provincia de Parinacota
- Province
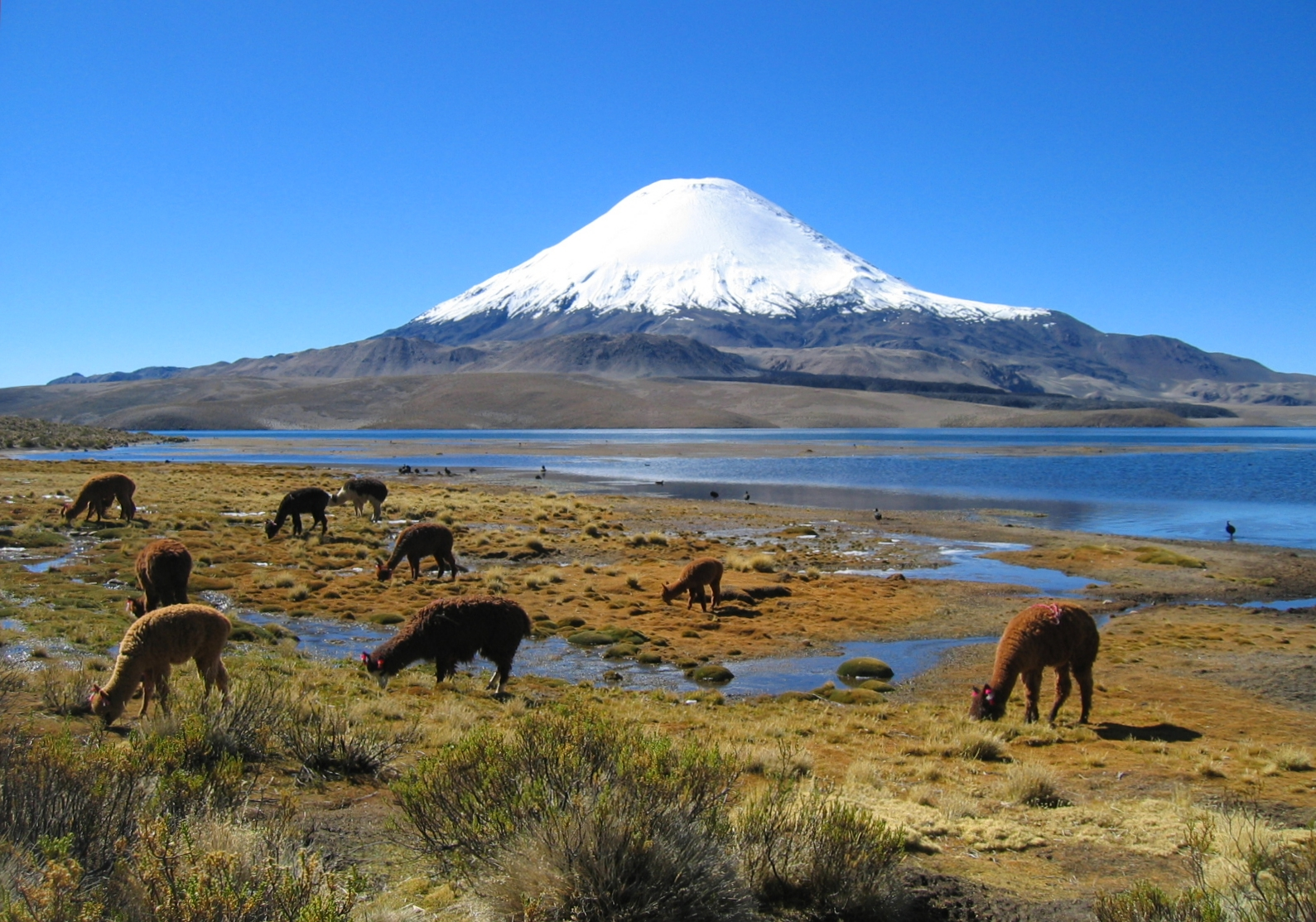
- Parinacota Volcano

- Seal

- Location in the Arica-Parinacota Region

- Location in Chile
- Coordinates: 18°11′47″S 69°33′34″W
- Country: Chile
- Region: Arica y Parinacota
- Named for: Parinacota Volcano
- Capital: Putre
- Communes: General Lagos; Putre

Government
  - Type: Provincial
  - Presidential Provincial Delegate: Wagner Sanhueza Guzmán

Area
  - Total: 8,146.9 km^{2} (3,145.5 sq mi)

Population (2002 Census)
  - Total: 3,156
  - Density: 0.3874/km^{2} (1.003/sq mi)
  - Urban: 1,235
  - Rural: 1,921

Sex
  - Men: 2,106
  - Women: 1,050
- Time zone: UTC-4 (CLT)
  - Summer (DST): UTC-3 (CLST)
- Area code: 56 + 58
- Website: Government of Parinacota

Parinacota Province (Spanish: Provincia de Parinacota) is one of two provinces of the Chilean region of Arica y Parinacota. Its capital is Putre. It is named after the Parinacota Volcano.

== History ==
Arica y Parinacota Region was created on October 8, 2007, under Law 20.175, promulgated on March 23, 2007, by President Michelle Bachelet in the city of Arica. The law divided the former Tarapacá Region into two: the northern portion became the XV Arica y Parinacota Region, and the southern portion remained the I Tarapacá Region.

== Geography and demography ==
According to the 2002 census by the National Statistics Institute (INE), the province spans an area of 8,146.9 km^{2} (3,146 sq mi) and had a population of 3,156 inhabitants (2,106 men and 1,050 women), giving it a population density of 0.4/km^{2} (1/sq mi). It is the second least populated province in the country after Antártica Chilena and fifth most sparsely populated province. Between the 1992 and 2002 censuses, the population fell by 17.3% (659 persons). The 2017 Census saw a 9.3% recovery to 3,449 people.

A 1995 study shows that contrary to the Chilean Spanish spoken in most of Chile there is at least among some of its inhabitants a pronunciation that lacks yeísmo.

== Administration ==
As a province, Parinacota is a second-level administrative division of Chile consisting of two communes: General Lagos in the northern portion and Putre in the south. The town of Putre serves as the provincial capital. The provincial government is led by delegate Wagner Sanhueza Guzmán, who was appointed by president Gabriel Boric.
