= Arica y Parinacota Region =

Region of Chile

Arica y Parinacota Region Región de Arica y Parinacota
- Region of Chile
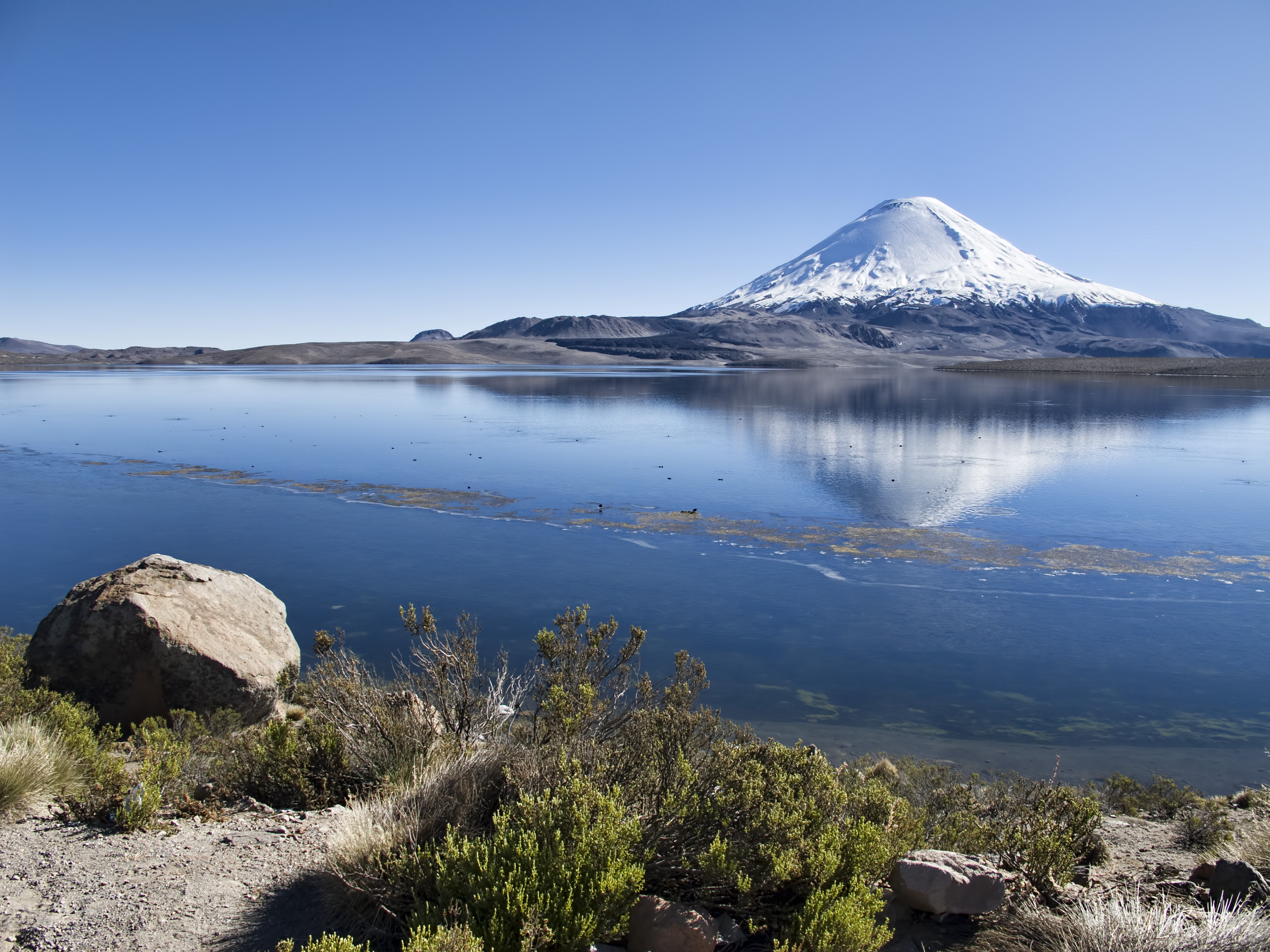
- Parinacota Volcano and Chungará Lake

- Flag Seal Coat of arms

- Map of Arica y Parinacota Region
- Coordinates: 18°28′30″S 70°18′52″W
- Country: Chile
- Capital: Arica
- Provinces: Arica, Parinacota

Government
  - Governor: Diego Paco (RN)
  - Presidential delegate: Cristián Sayes (RN)

Area
  - Total: 16,873.3 km^{2} (6,514.8 sq mi)
  - Rank: 12
- Highest elevation (Parinacota Volcano): 6,342 m (20,807 ft)
- Lowest elevation: 0 m (0 ft)

Population (2024)
  - Total: 244,569
  - Rank: 14
  - Density: 14.4944/km^{2} (37.5404/sq mi)

GDP (PPP)
  - Total: $2.315 billion (2014)
  - Per capita: $9,848 (2014)
- ISO 3166 code: CL-AP
- HDI (2023): 0.905; very high
- Website: gorearicayparinacota.cl (in Spanish)

The Arica y Parinacota Region (Spanish: Región de Arica y Parinacota pronounced [aˈɾikaj paɾinaˈkota]) is the northernmost of Chile's 16 first order administrative divisions. It comprises two provinces, Arica and Parinacota. It borders Peru's Department of Tacna to the north, Bolivia's La Paz and Oruro departments to the east and Chile's Tarapacá Region to the south. Arica y Parinacota is the 5th smallest, the 3rd least populous and the 6th least densely populated of the regions of Chile. Arica is the region's capital and largest city.

The region was a former Peruvian department, which was occupied by Chile under the 1883 Treaty of Ancón at the close of the War of the Pacific, and then formally annexed in 1929 by the Treaty of Lima. Following annexation, Arica y Parinacota went through a process of forced acculturation known as Chilenization with the aim of creating a dominance of Chilean traditions and culture.

== History ==
Its foundation is uncertain, as there is no consensus on the date of its establishment, nor are there historical documents that clearly attest to it. Its development was precarious until 1545, when the Indigenous man Diego Huallpa discovered in Potosí, the largest and richest silver mines of the New World. Arica became the natural port of Potosí for the export of silver, a fact reflected in its coat of arms. Owing to the silver shipments, the settlement was granted the title of city and came to be known at that time as La muy ilustre y Real Ciudad San Marcos de Arica (“The Very Illustrious and Royal City of San Marcos de Arica.”) From that point on, the city became the seat of one of the 77 corregimientos of the Viceroyalty of Peru, and its population reached 30,000 inhabitants.

With the creation of the system of intendancies, Arica came to depend directly on the Intendancy of Arequipa. In 1823, the Province of Arica was created as part of the Department of Arequipa, within the Republic of Peru. In 1828, the capital of the province of Arica was moved from Arica to Tacna. In 1837, the province, together with the Province of Tarapacá, became part of the newly created Littoral Department, with its capital in Tacna.

In 1855, Ramón Castilla, a native of Tarapacá, divided the Province of Tacna, within the Littoral Department into two provinces: Tacna and Arica. In 1857, the Department of Moquegua was created, comprising the provinces of Arica, Tacna, Moquegua, and Tarapacá, with Tacna as its capital. In 1868, the Littoral Province of Tarapacá was created, separating it from the Department of Moquegua. In 1875, the Littoral Province of Moquegua was created, with its capital in the city of Moquegua, and the Department of Moquegua was renamed the Department of Tacna. The Littoral Province of Tarapacá became the Department of Tarapacá in 1878, consisting of the provinces of Tarapacá and Iquique.

With the Treaty of Ancón, following the War of the Pacific, the Peruvian Department of Tarapacá was incorporated into Chile in 1883. Subsequently, the Province of Tarapacá was created, comprising the Department of Tarapacá and the Department of Pisagua. Meanwhile, Chile began administering Tacna, Arica, and later Tarata through the Province of Tacna and the Departments of Tacna and Arica. In 1925, Tarata was returned to Peru.

In 1929, following the signing of the Treaty of Lima, the Department of Arica, formerly part of the Province of Tacna, became definitively Chilean. Subsequently, Chile decided to incorporate the Department of Arica into the Province of Tarapacá.

The regionalization process carried out in 1976 by CONARA divided the country into thirteen regions, creating the First Region of Tarapacá based on the former province of the same name, composed of the departments of Arica, Pisagua, and Iquique. Iquique was designated as the capital of this new region, despite the fact that Arica was a more commercially active and more populous city. This decision sparked, from that time onward, a political struggle for reform of the existing regionalization.

During the 1990s, this pressure intensified, and during the presidential campaign of Ricardo Lagos, he promised the creation of the new Region of Arica and Parinacota and the Region of Los Ríos. It was not until 2004 that Article of the 1980 Constitution, which established a fixed number of regions, was amended—this being the first step toward the creation of Arica and Parinacota. Finally, on 16 may 2015, the executive branch announced the submission of a bill to create both regions. The bill was signed by President Lagos on 21 October and submitted to the National Congress on 13 December of the same year.

=== Creation of the new region ===
The bill presented at that time consisted of three main reforms:

1. The creation of the new Region of Arica and Parinacota, comprising the provinces of Arica and Parinacota, formerly part of the Region of Tarapacá.
2. The creation of a new senatorial constituency covering the new region. The existing District 1 would remain unchanged, and Senatorial Constituency No. 20 would be created for this purpose.
3. The Region of Tarapacá would thereafter be composed solely of the territory of the current Province of Iquique. This province would be divided into two provinces: Iquique, consisting of the commune of the same name and Alto Hospicio, and the new Province of Tamarugal, comprising the remaining communes, with Pozo Almonte as its provincial capital.

After the bill entered the National Congress, it was debated in the Chamber of Deputies, where it was approved both in general and in detail during the first constitutional procedure on 19 April 2006, with 90 votes in favor and 11 abstentions. However, the creation of a new electoral constituency was rejected, under the assumption that a comprehensive reform of the electoral system would be carried out in the future. The bill was then sent to the Senate for its second constitutional procedure. It was approved with amendments on 6 December 2006, requiring its return to the Chamber of Deputies, which approved the amendments during the third constitutional procedure on 19 December 2006.

Proposed flag for the Region of Arica and Parinacota

Following approval by both chambers, the bill was sent on 23 January 2007 to the Constitutional Court, which approved the amendment three days later. However, Ruling No. 719 of the court declared the second paragraph of Article 1 of the bill unconstitutional, stating that "its content does not have a direct relationship with the core or fundamental ideas of the original executive bill on the matter, thereby violating Article 69, paragraph one, of the Constitution," and therefore ordered its removal from the text.

This paragraph referred to the projected boundaries of the new region and originated from an amendment introduced by President Michelle Bachelet during the second constitutional procedure in December 2006. It had prompted an observation by Peru, within the context of the maritime boundary dispute between the two countries, by considering "the parallel of Boundary Marker No. 1 in the Chilean Sea" as the starting point of the northern border. Upon removal of the paragraph, the region's boundaries were defined according to those established for the provinces of Arica and Parinacota in Decree with Force of Law No. 2-18.175 of the Ministry of the Interior (1989). This decree defines the northern boundary of those provinces as "the border with Peru, from the Chilean Sea to the astronomical parallel of the Huaylas triangulation point" and "the border with Peru, from Cerro Quiñuta to the border with Bolivia," respectively, and the western boundary of the Province of Arica as "the Chilean Sea, from Punta Camarones to the border with Peru."

After completion of all legislative procedures, President Michelle Bachelet signed the promulgating decree of Law No. 20,175, which created the Region of Arica and Parinacota, and it entered into force on 8 October 2007.

== Administration ==
In 2007, the former Tarapacá Region was subdivided to create the Arica y Parinacota region and the present day Tarapacá Region to the south. The region is further subdivided into two provinces: Arica and Parinacota.

Region	Province	Commune	Area (km²)	2002 Population	Website
Arica y Parinacota
	Arica				
		Camarones	3,927	1,220	link
		Arica	4,799	185,268	link
Parinacota
		Putre	5,903	1,977	link
		General Lagos	2,244	1,179	link

== Demography ==
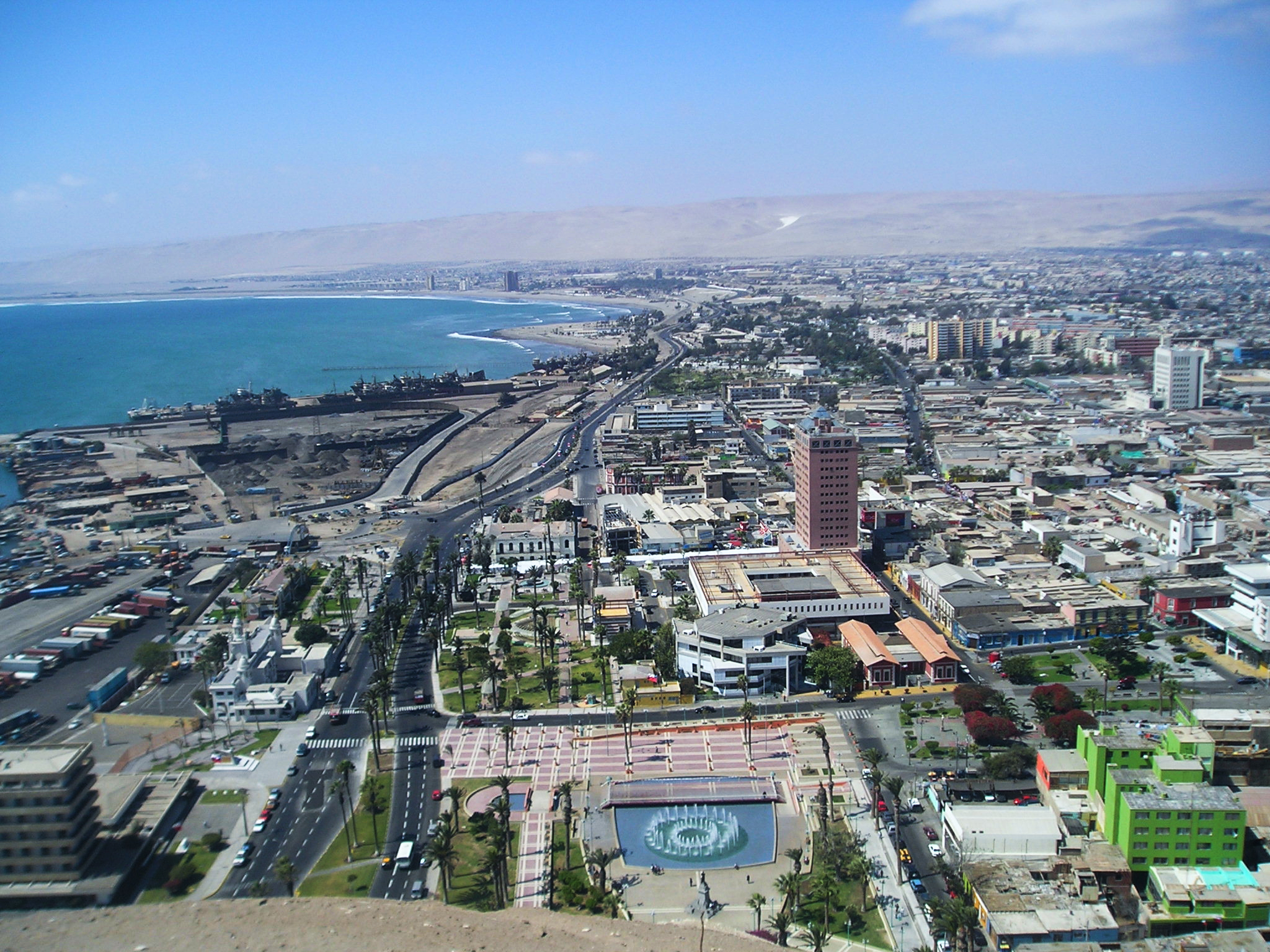
Arica

According to data from the 2024 Census of the National Statistics Institute, the region is populated by 244,569 inhabitants. Its density reaches 14.49 inhabitants per km².

This region has the largest Aymara population and the 2024 census recorded 70,270 inhabitants identifying as Aymara, as well as a significant number of immigrants from neighboring Peru and Bolivia. Included are those of Asian descent, such as Chinese and Japanese; and Arabs from Lebanon, Palestine and Syria. Most of the country’s Afro-Chilean population lives in Arica Province, descending from enslaved Africans brought to the area during the 17th and 18th centuries. According to the most recent census, 13,003 people representing 5.4% of the region's population identify as Afro-Chilean. There are a large number of Roma people or Gypsies in the Arica province as well, originated from Eastern Europe in the late 19th century.

At the level of cities, the most populated are: Arica, with 241,653 inhabitants and Putre, with 1,547 inhabitants.

=== Religion ===
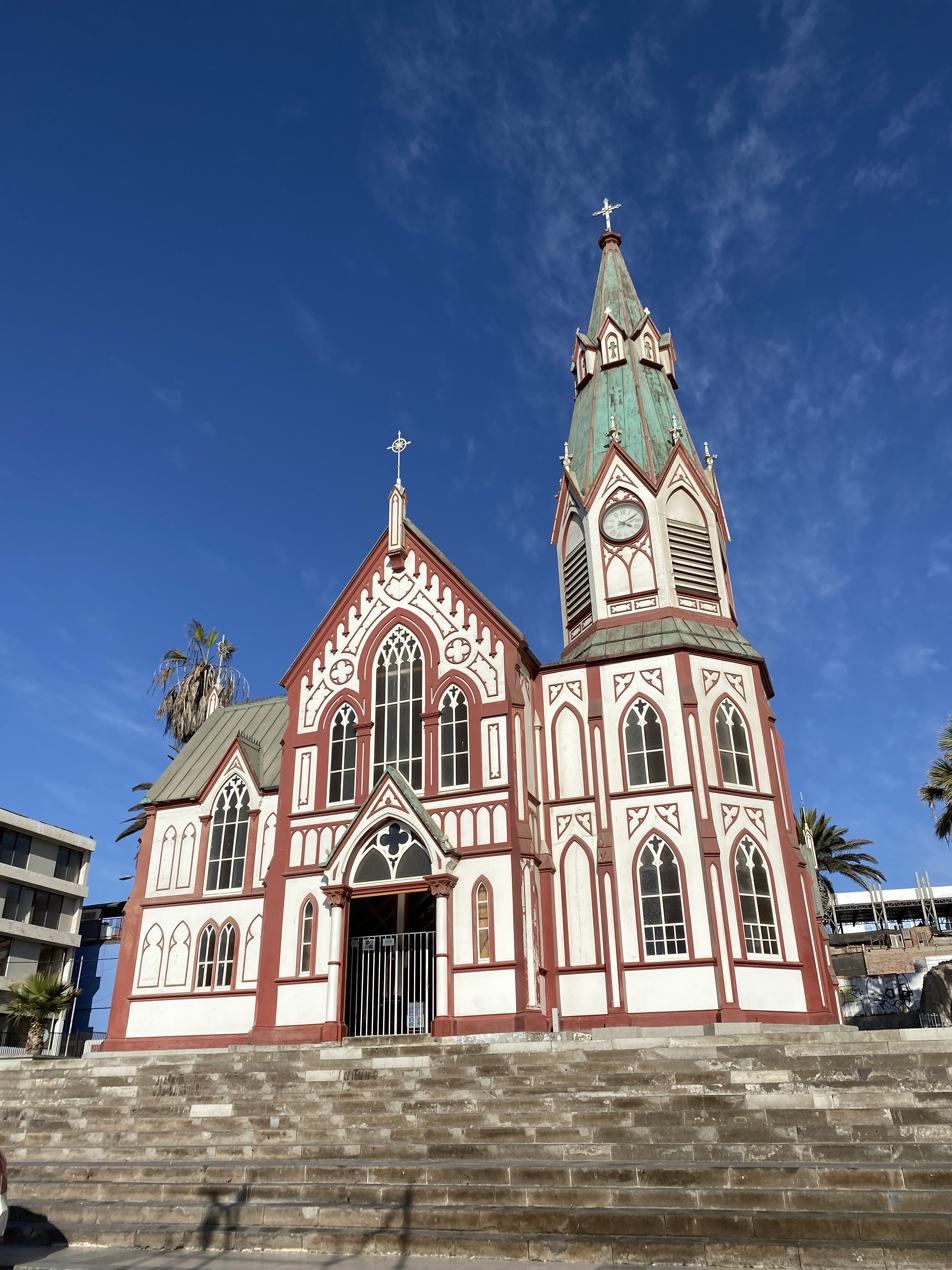
Catedral de San Marcos in Arica

According to 2024 census data on the population aged 15 years and over, totalled 147,837 or 60.4% of regional population, the region shows a religious composition broadly similar to that of northern Chile, combining a historically dominant Christian tradition with a relatively high proportion of people without religious affiliation. Of this total, 68,923 are men and 78,914 are women, showing a higher female participation in religious affiliation at the regional level.

The male-to-female ratio in the region is 87.3, a value above the national average (83.5). This indicates a relatively more balanced gender distribution compared to the country as a whole, although the general trend of female predominance remains.

In the national context, Arica and Parinacota is among the regions with the lowest absolute number of people declaring a religion, a situation largely explained by its smaller overall population. Nevertheless, the pattern observed in the region is consistent with that of Chile as a whole, where women outnumber men in religious self-identification.

Christianity is the majority religion in the region. Roman Catholicism is the largest religious affiliation, accounting for 110,281 people (56.1%) of the population aged 15 and over. Catholicism has historically played a central role in the cultural and social life of the region, influenced both by colonial heritage and Andean religious traditions. Evangelical and Protestant churches form the second-largest religious group, with 25,611 adherents. Their presence reflects broader national trends of evangelical growth, particularly in urban and peri-urban areas.

Other Christian denominations include Jehovah's Witnesses (3,278), members of The Church of Jesus Christ of Latter-day Saints (2,389), other Christian traditions (4,710), and a small number of Eastern Orthodox Christians (104).

Non-Christian religions are present in small numbers. These include Judaism (223), Islam (158), Buddhism (168), Hinduism (72), and the Baháʼí Faith (15). Their limited size reflects both national demographic patterns and the region's relatively small population.

A significant proportion of the population reports no religious affiliation, totaling 47,049 people, one of the notable features of the region's religious landscape. Additionally, 1,653 people did not declare a religion or belief.

== Geography ==
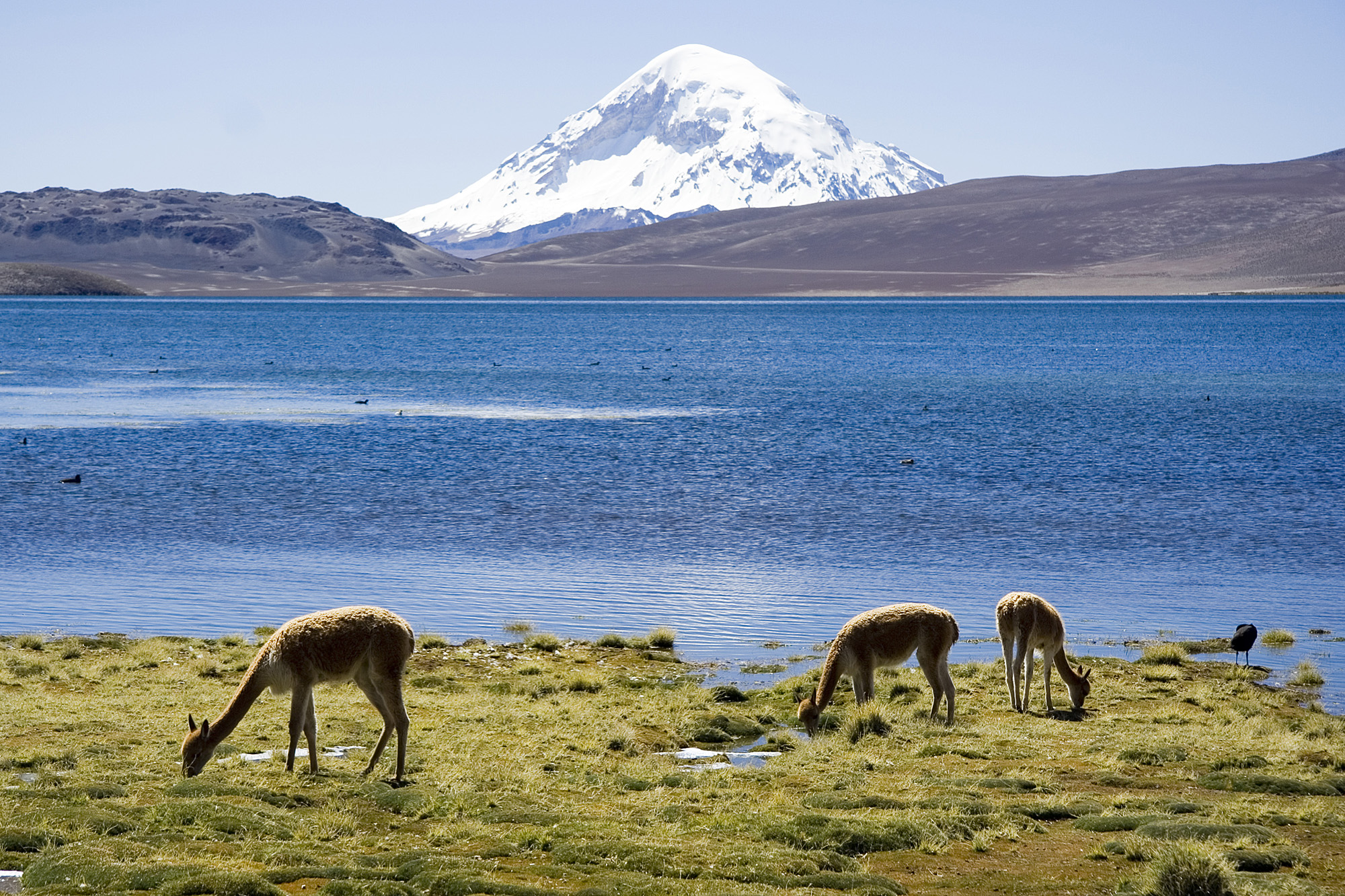
Lauca National Park

Due to its location, it is a region with desert characteristics. Its geography is composed of five clearly demarcated longitudinal zones. Coastal plains are extremely scarce and almost nonexistent, with the exception of Arica, owing to the presence of the Coastal Range, which begins at Cerro Camaraca, 30 km south of the Line of Concordance (Línea de la Concordia). This mountain range does not reach great heights but descends abruptly toward the sea. The Intermediate Depression reaches approximately 40 kilometers in width and 500 kilometers in length. This depression is intersected by ravines, which constitute the only watercourses in the region, the most notable being Azapa, Lluta, Camarones, and Vítor. Between these ravines lie the so-called pampas.

The Andes mountain range is divided into two branches: an eastern branch that runs through Bolivia and a western branch that passes through Chile. In this area there are several active volcanoes rising above 6,000 meters in elevation, such as Pomerape, Guallatiri, and Parinacota, the latter reaching 6,348 meters (20,827 ft) and constituting the highest point in the region. The Andean Altiplano, located between the eastern and western ranges, has an average elevation of 4,000 meters. It contains several endorheic rivers and lakes (the Caquena, Lauca, Isluga, and Cariquima rivers, Lake Chungará, and the Parinacota, Cotacotani, and Blanca lagoons), which give rise to salt flats such as the Surire Salt Flat, as well as bofedales (high-altitude wetlands). These environments support a high level of biodiversity, including animals such as llamas, guanacos, vicuñas, alpacas, and flamingos, as well as flora such as the llareta plant. The high altitude causes altitude sickness, also known as puna, in many people, due to the lower atmospheric pressure compared to what they are accustomed to.

=== Hydrology ===
The region's two main rivers are the Lauca, which drains into Bolivia's Coipasa salt flat (Lago Coipasa), and the Lluta, which flows into the Pacific Ocean.

=== Climate ===
The climate differs markedly between the coastal zone, the pampas, and the Altiplano. Along the coast, the climate is temperate, with high humidity and very low precipitation, remaining relatively stable throughout the year, with temperatures ranging between 15 °C and 30 °C depending on the season. Daily temperature variation is minimal. There is also abundant coastal cloud cover, which penetrates inland into the pampas and forms a dense fog locally known as camanchaca.

The Altiplano experiences very abrupt temperature changes, with daytime temperatures reaching up to 35 °C and dropping to –20 °C at night. A similar phenomenon occurs in the desert, although temperatures there do not reach such low nighttime values. Precipitation is virtually nonexistent; however, the limited rainfall that does occur generally falls on the Andean puna during the austral summer (February). This climatic phenomenon is known as the Altiplanic winter (invierno altiplánico) or Bolivian High (alta de Bolivia).

In the coastal sector, temperatures are mild, with only slight daily and seasonal variations. Toward the interior, considered an area of absolute desert, atmospheric dryness is extreme and daily thermal oscillations are very pronounced.

== Border dispute with Peru ==
Maritime claims of Ecuador and Peru, showing areas in dispute with Chile.

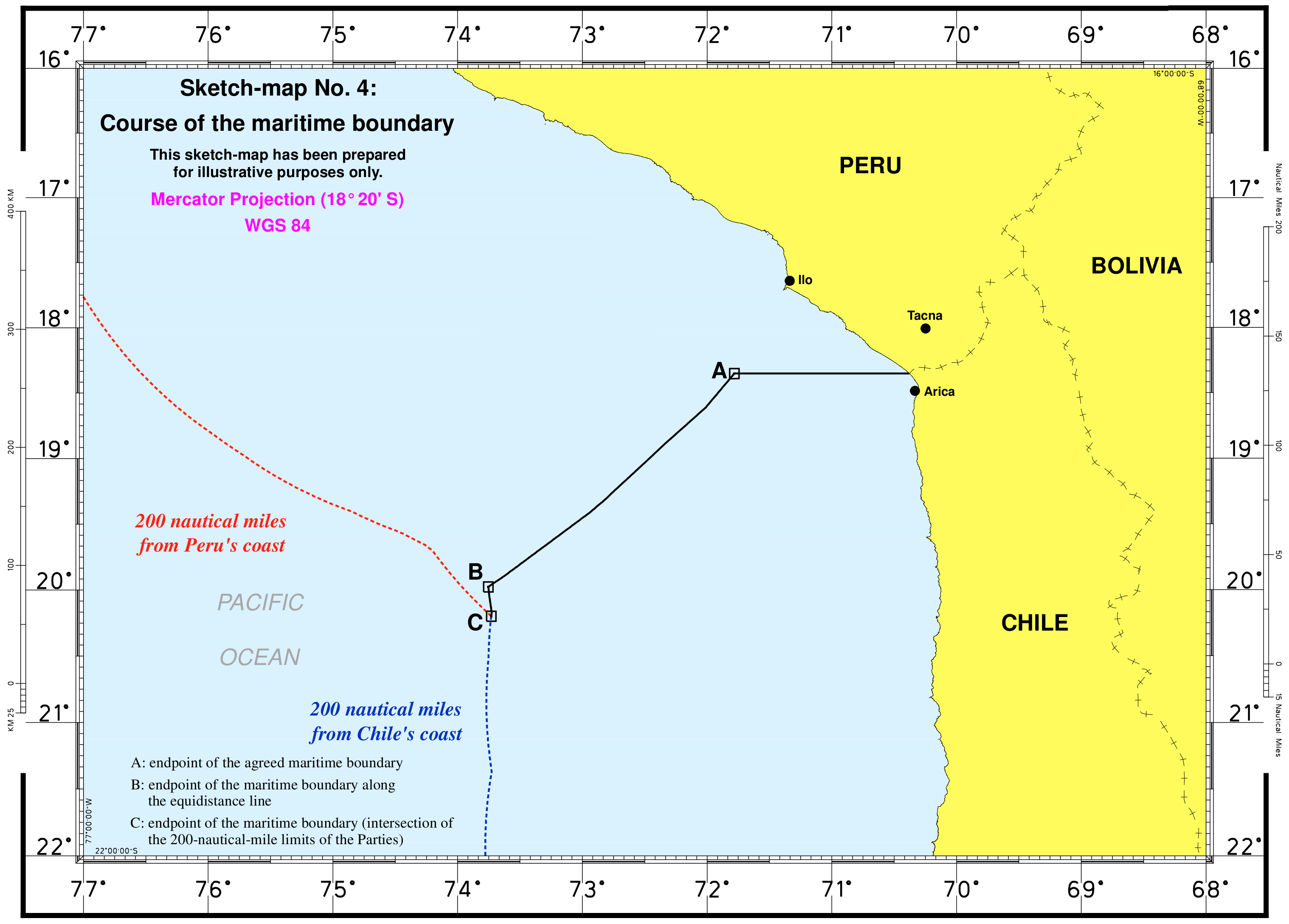
The maritime boundary between Chile and Peru as defined by the International Court of Justice on 27 January 2014.

On 26 January 2007, Peru's government issued a protest against Chile's demarcation of the coastal frontier the two countries share. According to the Peruvian Foreign Ministry, the Chilean legislatures had endorsed a plan regarding the Arica y Parinacota region which did not comply with the current established territorial demarcation. Moreover, it is alleged that the proposed Chilean law included an assertion of sovereignty over 19,000 m^{2} (204,514 sq ft) of land in Peru's Department of Tacna. According to the Peruvian Foreign Ministry, Chile has defined a new region "without respecting the Concordia demarcation."

For its part, the Chilean government has asserted that the region in dispute is not a coastal site named Concordia, but instead refers to boundary stone No. 1, which is located to the northeast and 200 meters inland. A possible border dispute was averted when the Chilean Constitutional Court formally ruled on 26 January 2007, against the legislation. While agreeing with the court's ruling, the Chilean government reiterated its stance that the maritime borders between the two nations were not in question and have been formally recognized by the international community. The Peruvian government has stated that it might turn to the international court at The Hague to solve the dispute.

On 27 January 2014, in the final ruling of the International Court of Justice located in The Hague, Peru gained some maritime territory. The maritime boundary extends only to 80 nautical miles off of the coast. From that point, the new border runs in a southwest direction to a point that is 200 miles equidistant from the coast of the two countries.

Under the ruling, Chile lost control over part of its formerly claimed maritime territory and gives additional maritime territory to Peru.

From the 27 January 2014 court press release:

The Court concludes that the maritime boundary between the Parties starts at the intersection of the parallel of latitude passing through Boundary Marker No. 1 with the low-water line, and extends for 80 nautical miles along that parallel of latitude to Point A. From this point, the maritime boundary runs along the equidistance line to Point B, and then along the 200-nautical-mile limit measured from the Chilean baselines to Point C. In view of the circumstances of the case, the Court has defined the course of the maritime boundary between the Parties without determining the precise geographical co-ordinates.

== Notable people ==
- Cristian Garín (born 30 May 1996), professional tennis player.
- Carolina Mestrovic (born 20 July 1991), singer, actress and TV host.
- Vlado Mirosevic (born 23 May 1987), member of the Chamber of Deputies of Chile
- Denisse van Lamoen (born 12 September 1979), first Chilean archer to compete at the Summer Olympics.
- Américo (born 24 December 1977), Tropical music and Chilean cumbia singer.
- Dante Poli (born 15 August 1976), football pundit and former player
- Manuel García (born 1 March 1970), folk-pop singer-songwriter and guitarist
- Humberto Donoso (1938–2000), former football player, played for Chile in the 1966 FIFA World Cup
- Guillermo Billinghurst (born 27 July 1851), former president of Peru
- Izkia Jasvin Siches Pastén (born 4 March 1986), President of Colegio Médico de Chile
- Osvaldo Hurtado (born 2 November 1957), former soccer player
- Sergio Hernández (born 27 April 1945), actor

== See also ==
- Ancuta
- Atacama Desert
- Azapa Valley
- Caleta Vítor
- Chitita
- Chucuyo
- Climate of Chile
- Cosapilla
- Esquiña
- Geography of Chile
- Las Maitas
- List of volcanoes in Chile
- Molinos
- Poconchile
- Tignamar
