= Lauca (disambiguation) =

Lauca may refer to:

- Lauca, a biosphere reserve in Chile
- Lauca Dam, a dam currently being built on the Cuanza River in Angola
- Lauca National Park, a national park in Chile
- Lauca River, a river flowing from Chile into Bolivia
- Lauca (volcano), a volcano in Chile
