= Parinacota (volcano) =

Volcano on the border of Chile and Bolivia

Parinacota Parina Quta
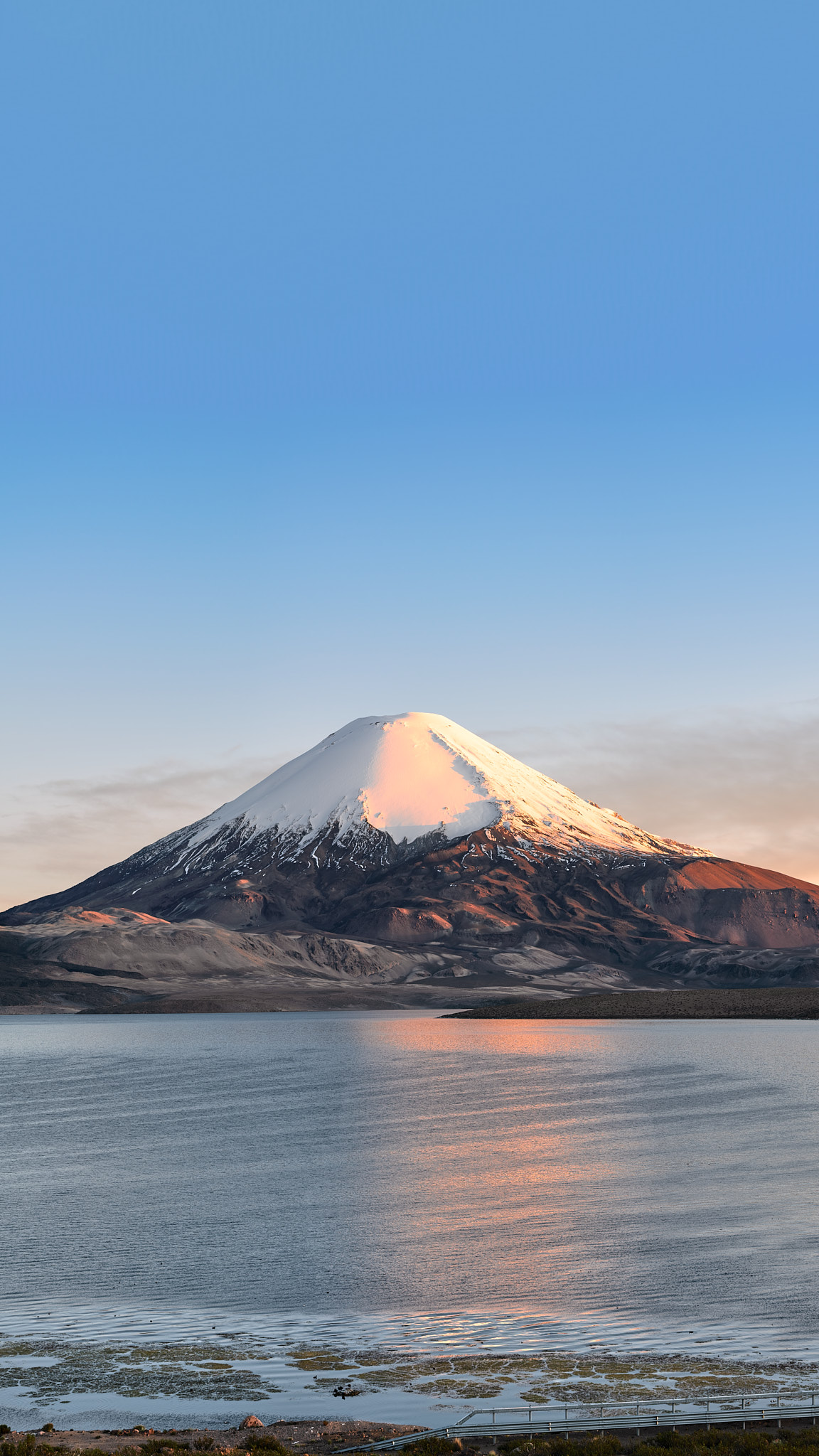
- Parinacota and Chungará Lake

Highest point
- Elevation: 6,380 m (20,930 ft)
- Listing: Ultra
- Coordinates: 18°09′58″S 69°08′31″W

Geography
- Location within Bolivia
- Location: Bolivia – Chile border
- Parent range: Andes

Geology
- Mountain type: Stratovolcano
- Volcanic zone: Central Volcanic Zone
- Last eruption: 290 CE ± 300 years

Climbing
- First ascent: 1928
- Easiest route: snow/rock scramble

Parinacota (in Hispanicized spelling), Parina Quta or Parinaquta is a dormant stratovolcano on the border of Bolivia and Chile. Together with Pomerape it forms the Nevados de Payachata volcanic chain. Part of the Central Volcanic Zone of the Andes, its summit reaches an elevation of 6,380 metres (20,930 ft) above sea level. The symmetrical cone is capped by a summit crater 1,000 metres (3,300 ft) wide. Further down on the southern slopes lie three parasitic centres known as the Ajata cones. These cones have generated lava flows. The volcano overlies a platform formed by lava domes and andesitic lava flows.

The volcano started growing during the Pleistocene and formed a large cone. At some point between the Pleistocene and the Holocene, the western flank of the volcano collapsed, generating a giant landslide that spread west and formed a large, hummocky landslide deposit. The avalanche crossed and dammed a previously existing drainage, impounding or enlarging Lake Chungará; numerous other lakes now forming the headwaters of the Rio Lauca sprang up within the deposit. Volcanic activity rebuilt the cone after the collapse, cancelling out the collapse scar.

Parinacota had numerous effusive and explosive eruptions during the Holocene, the latest about 200 years ago. While there are no recorded eruptions, legends of the local Aymara people imply that they may have witnessed one eruption. Renewed activity at Parinacota is possible in the future, although the relatively low population density in the region would limit potential damage. Some towns and a regional highway between Bolivia and Chile are potentially exposed to the effects of a new eruption.

== Name ==
The name "Parinacota" is Aymara. Parina means flamingo and quta lake. Parinacota and its neighbour Pomerape are also known as the Nevados de Payachata, "twins". This refers to the fact that the volcanoes resemble each other.

== Geomorphology and geology ==
Parinacota lies in the Altiplano, a high plateau in the Central Andes. The border between Bolivia and Chile bisects the volcano and runs along the rim of the crater, which lies in Bolivia. In Chile, where most of the edifice is located, Parinacota lies in the commune of Putre, Arica y Parinacota Region, and in Bolivia in the Oruro Department of the Sajama Province. The towns of Ajata and Parinacota lie southwest and west of the volcano, respectively. The region lies at high altitude and access is difficult, hampering research on the volcanoes of the Central Andes.

=== Regional ===
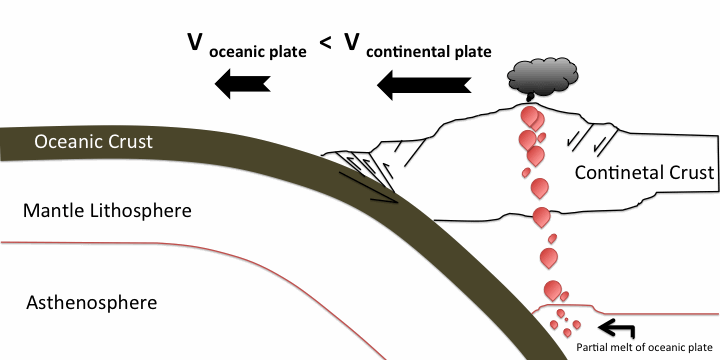
Subduction

The Nazca Plate and Antarctic Plate subduct beneath the South America Plate in the Peru-Chile Trench at a pace of 7–9 centimetres per year (2.8–3.5 in/year) and 2 centimetres per year (0.79 in/year), respectively, resulting in volcanic activity in the Andes. Present-day volcanism occurs within four discrete belts: The Northern Volcanic Zone (NVZ), the Central Volcanic Zone (CVZ), the Southern Volcanic Zone (SVZ) and the Austral Volcanic Zone (AVZ). These extend between 2°N-5°S, 16°S-28°S, 33°S-46°S and 49°S-55°S, respectively. Between them they contain about 60 active volcanoes and 118 volcanoes which appear to have been active during the Holocene, not including potentially active very large silicic volcanic systems or very small monogenetic ones. These belts of active volcanism occur where the Nazca Plate subducts beneath the South America Plate at a steep angle, while in the volcanically inactive gaps between them the subduction is much shallower; thus there is no asthenosphere between the slab of the subducting plate and the overriding plate in the gaps.

Parinacota is part of the CVZ, which contains about 44 active volcanoes. Most volcanoes of the CVZ are relatively poorly researched and many exceed 5,000 metres (16,000 ft) of elevation. Some of these edifices were active during historical time; these include El Misti, Lascar, San Pedro and Ubinas; the largest historical eruption of the CVZ occurred in 1600 at Huaynaputina. Other volcanoes in the CVZ that have been the subject of research are Galan and Purico complex. The CVZ has a characteristically thick crust (50–70 kilometres (31–43 mi)) and the volcanic rocks have peculiar oxygen and strontium isotope ratios in comparison to the SVZ and NVZ. Parinacota lies in a segment of the CVZ where the Peru-Chile Trench undergoes a 45° curvature, and where the direction of subduction changes from diagonal to perpendicular. The crust is especially thick there, the reasons for this are not agreed upon yet and may vary between the western and eastern sides of the CVZ.

Subduction-related volcanism in the region has been ongoing since 200 million years ago, burying most of the Precambrian basement. Various units of sedimentary and volcanic origin form most of the outcropping basement in the region. A dramatic increment of volcanic activity occurred approximately 27 million years ago, when the Farallon Plate broke apart and subduction increased substantially. On the Chilean side, the basement is formed by the Oligocene-Miocene Lupica formation, the Miocene Ajoya volcanics, the Lauca formation and the Lauca Ignimbrite. On the Bolivian side the oldest volcanites are the Oligocene Kollukollu formation 34 million years ago and the 23 million years old Rondal Lavas. Miocene volcanic activity generated the Berenguela, Carangas and Mauri formations, followed by the Perez formation during the Pliocene and Pleistocene. These formations were all affected by terrain uplift and folding, probably linked to changes in the subduction regime. Volcanism continued into the late Pleistocene and Holocene (Condoriri 650,000±70,000 and Pomerape between 300,000-100,000 years ago), and was accompanied by glacial activity during the Pleistocene. During this whole time period, volcanic activity progressively migrated westward; presently, it is located on the Bolivia-Chile border.

=== Local ===
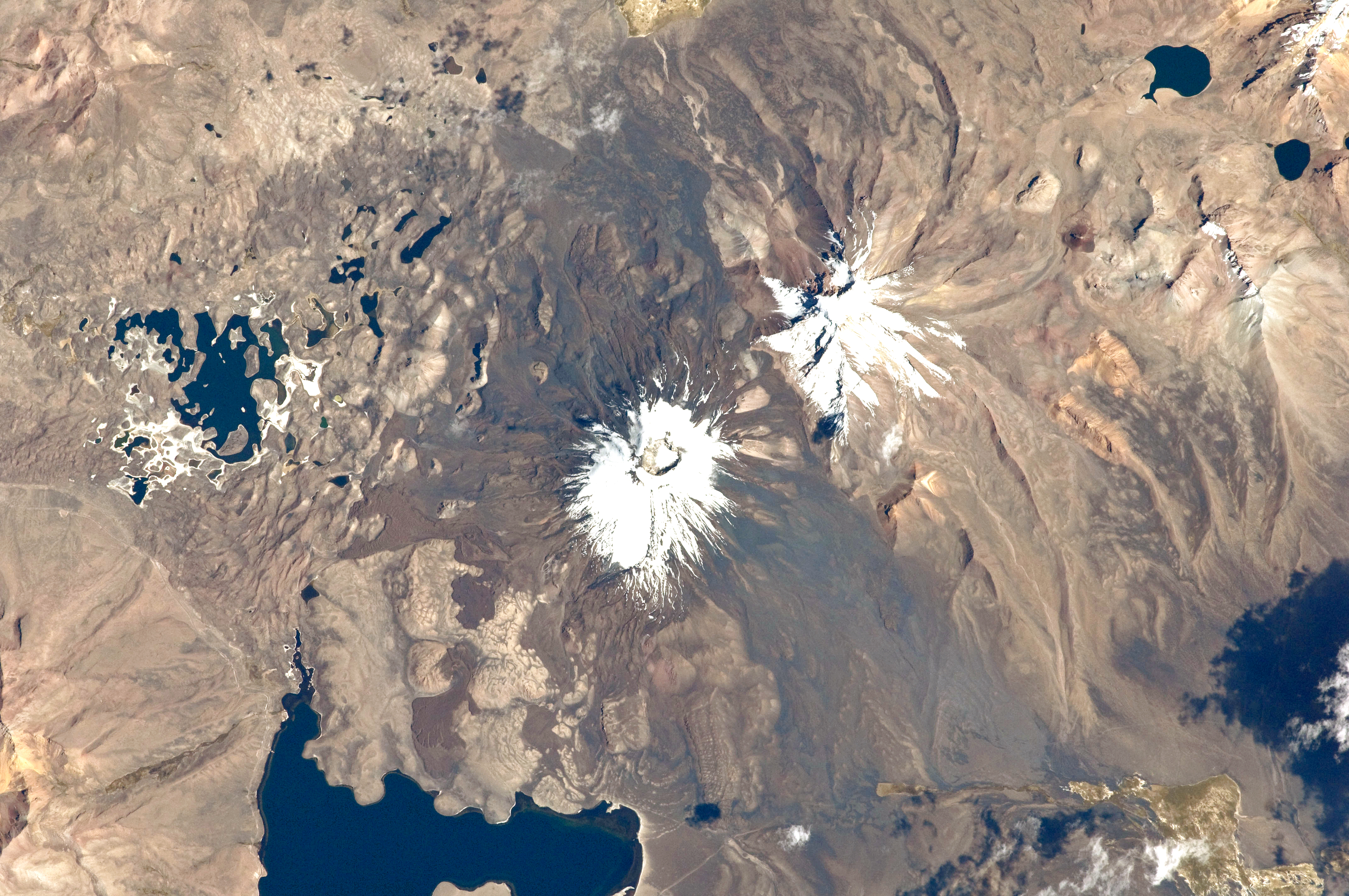
Parinacota volcano in the centre. Upper right is Pomerape, left are the Cotacotani Lakes and the avalanche deposit and the black structure below the middle is Lake Chungará

Parinacota is a highly symmetric volcanic cone, having the classical "regular cone" shape of a stratovolcano. The volcano is 6,250 metres (20,510 ft) or 6,380 metres (20,930 ft) high and features both blocky lava flows and scoria flows. Lava flows are fresh with levees, lobes and flow ridges, and reach lengths of 7 kilometres (4.3 mi) on the slopes of the cone. The lava flows are between 10–40 metres (33–131 ft) thick and can spread to widths of 1,200 metres (3,900 ft) at the foot of the volcano. Pyroclastic flows are also found, reaching lengths of 7 kilometres (4.3 mi) and are usually poorly consolidated, containing breadcrust bombs and breccia.

The volcano is capped by a 1 kilometre (0.62 mi) wide and 300 metres (980 ft) deep summit crater, which has a pristine appearance. Other data imply a width of 500 metres (1,600 ft) and a depth of 100 metres (330 ft). The crater is the source of pumice flows, which have well conserved surface features such as levees and lobes especially down on the eastern slope. These pumice flows extend as far as 2 kilometres (1.2 mi) away from the crater. An ashfall deposit spreads east from Parinacota to a distance of 15 kilometres (9.3 mi) in Bolivia. Ash and lapilli deposits have been found at the shores of Lake Chungará as well.

The cone sits atop a 50 metres (160 ft) thick multilobed andesitic platform known as the "Chungará Andesites" which crop out on the north shore of Lake Chungará in the form of a shelf. Overlying this shelf is a system of lava domes, which reach thicknesses of 150 metres (490 ft). The lava domes are accompanied by block and ash flow deposits that reach lengths of 3.5 kilometres (2.2 mi). A steep descent leads to Lake Chungará.

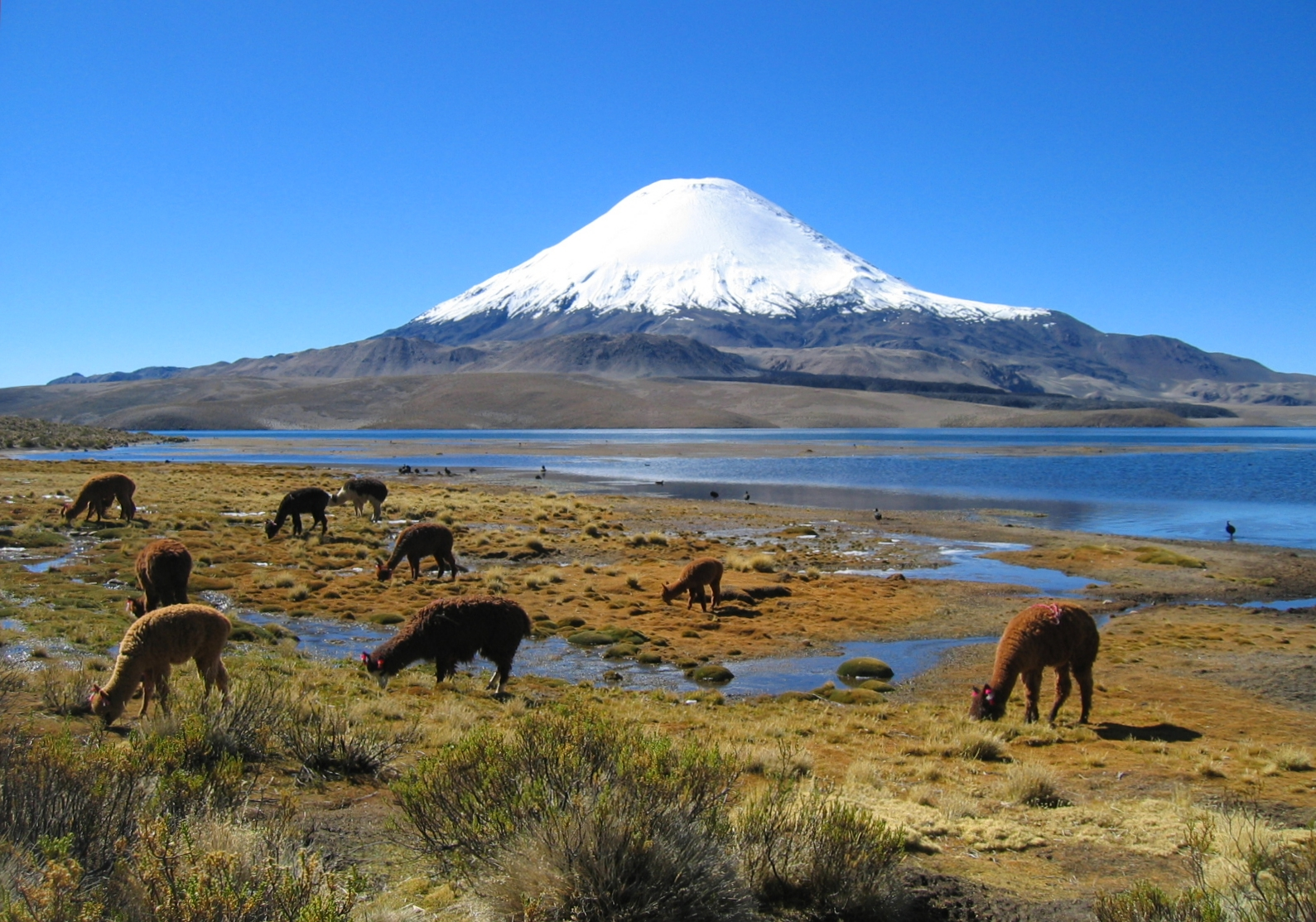
Parinacota volcano

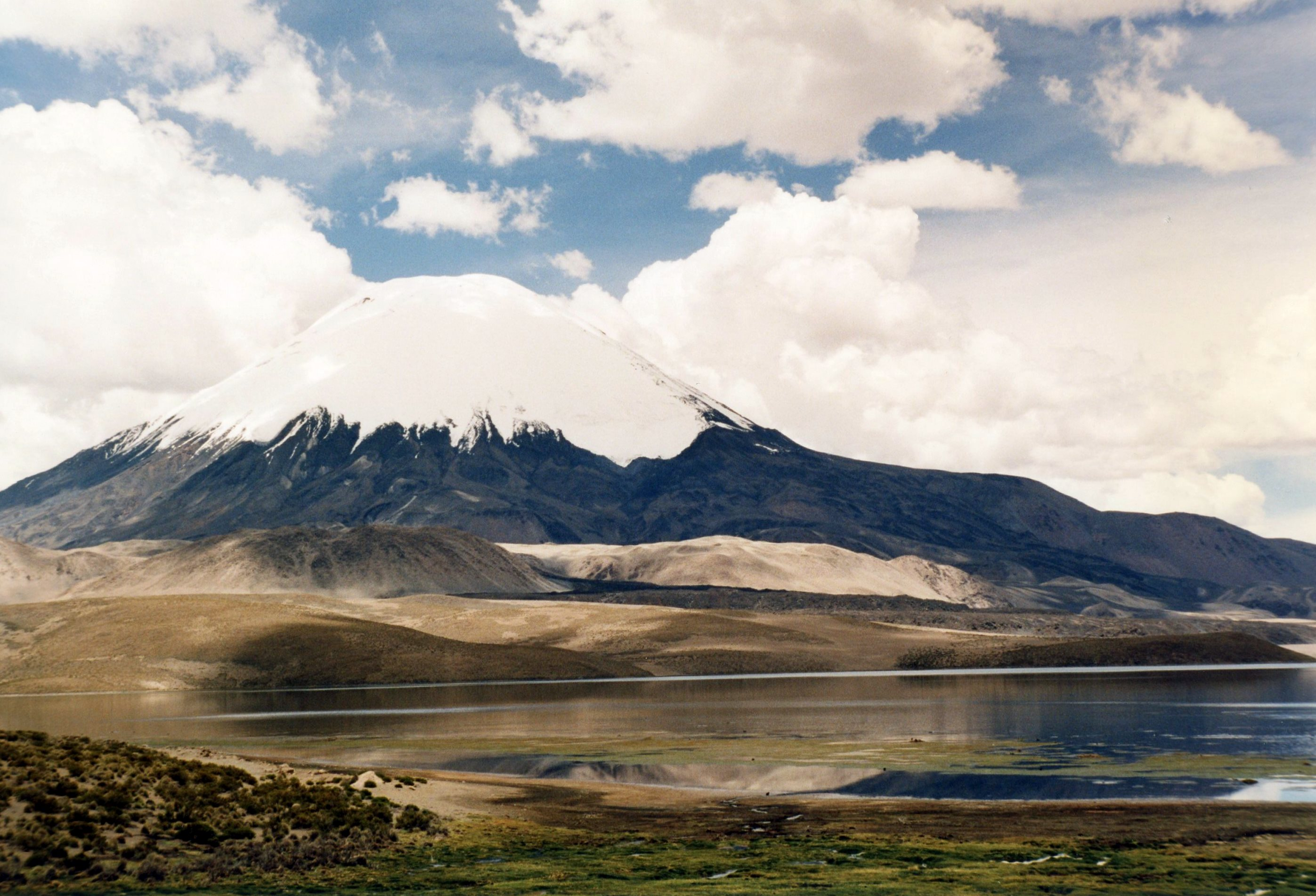
The white lava domes and a black lava flow are visible above the lake

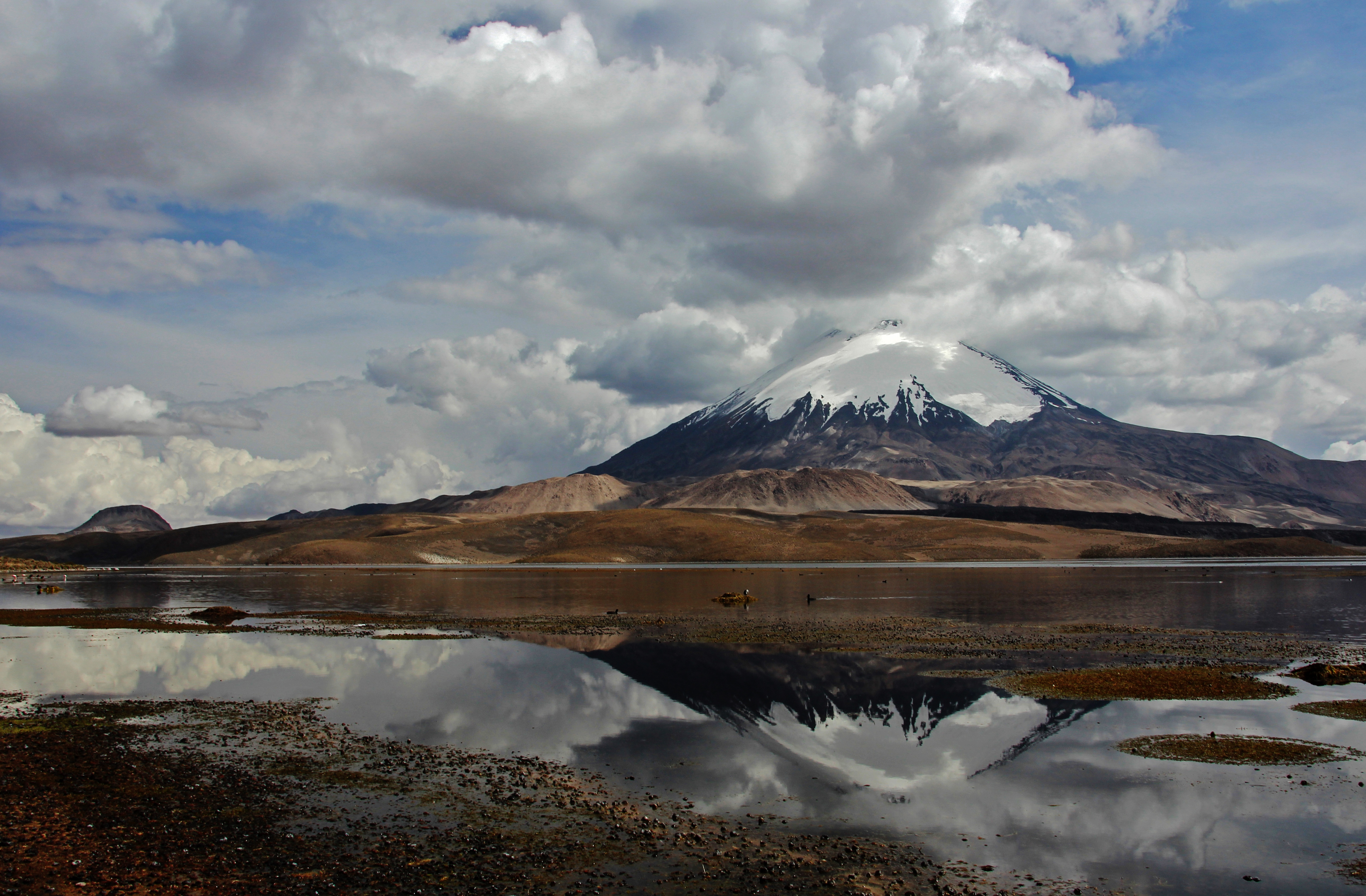
The domes at the foot of Parinacota are well visible. In the middle right of the image, one of the Ajata lava flows is recognizable

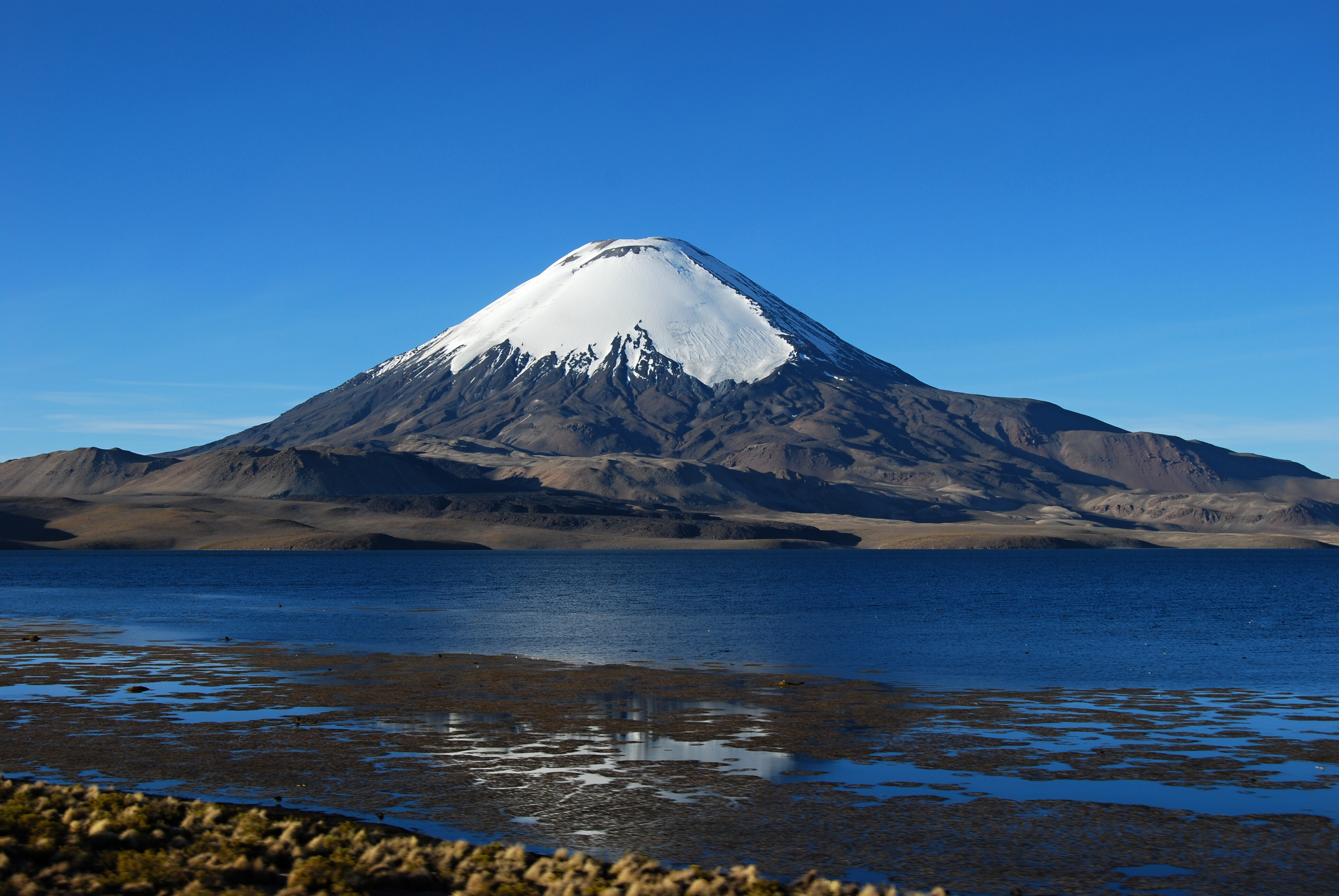
The grey lava domes and a black Ajata lava flow are clearly visible

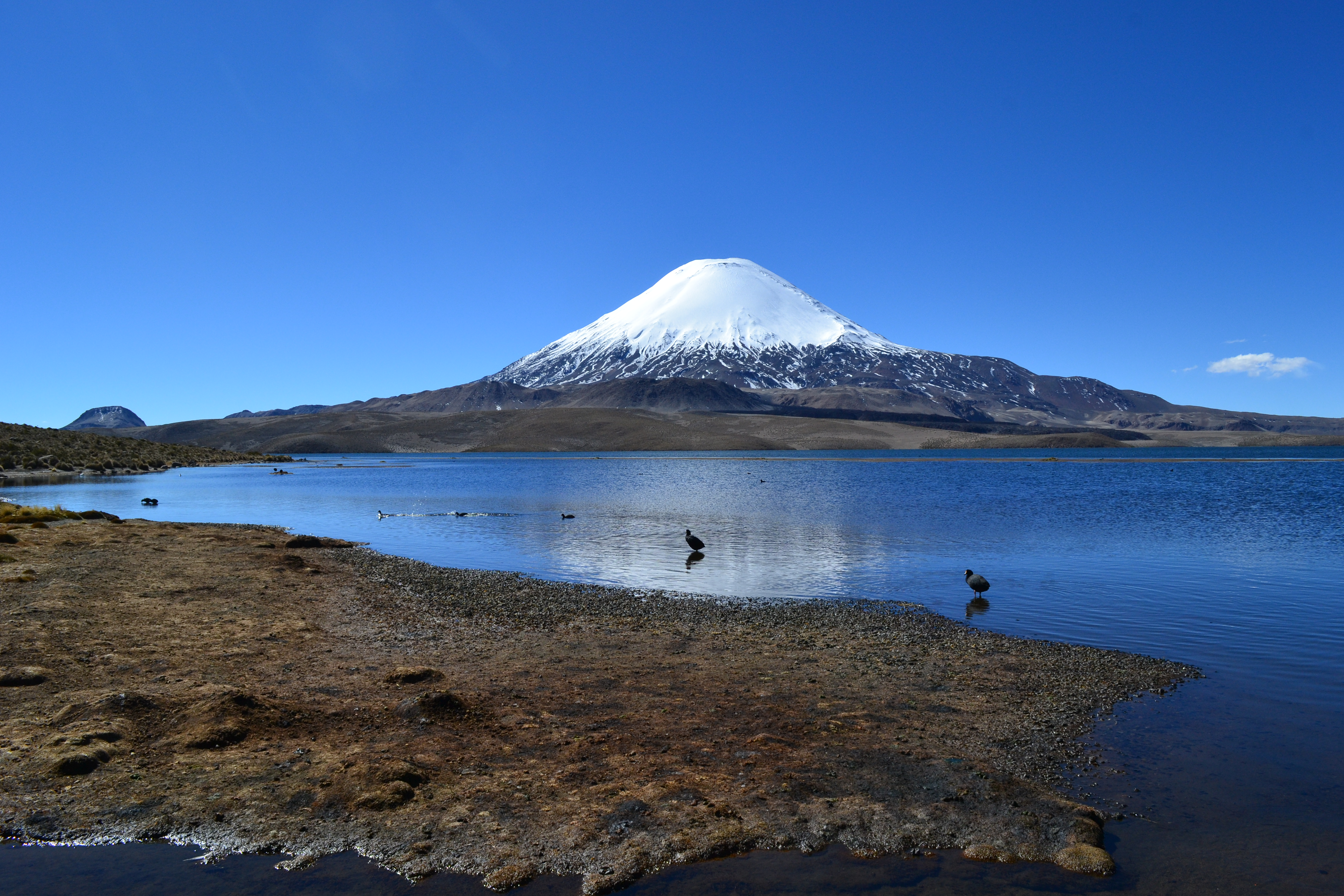
A black lava flow almost reaches the lake

South of the main edifice lie the parasitic vents known as the Ajata cones, which formed along a fissure that emanates from the main cone and is aligned with the regional Condoriri-Parinacota lineament. The dimensions of the cones reach 250 metres (820 ft) width and 70 metres (230 ft) height. The High Ajata flow emanates from a single cone and spreads southwest as a lobated lava flow. The middle Ajata flow is much smaller and is sourced to three different cones below the source of the High Ajata, each cone having its own small flow field. The upper and lower Ajata flows are only slightly smaller than the High Ajata flow and form superposed lava flows lower on the edifice. These lava flows are gray-black aa lava flows, commonly up to 20 metres (66 ft) thick; the longest of these flows reaches a length of 3 kilometres (1.9 mi).

Older are the large dacitic lava flows known as the "Border Dacites" on the southeastern side of Parinacota, which are 4 by 2 kilometres (2.5 mi × 1.2 mi) over horizontal distance. A similar but smaller lava flow lies west of the Border Dacites, entirely within Chile. These three lava flows have a total volume of about 6 cubic kilometres (1.4 cu mi). Overall, Parinacota rises 1,800 metres (5,900 ft) from a surface of 170–180 square kilometres (66–69 sq mi); the resulting edifice has a volume of 18–41 cubic kilometres (4.3–9.8 cu mi)

On the northern side Parinacota partly overlaps with Pomerape, which in turn overlies the rocks of Condoriri farther north; together the volcanoes form a north-northeast trending volcano chain. Parinacota, Pomerape, and volcanoes farther south like Quisiquisini, Guallatiri and Poquentica constitute the eastern margin of the Lauca basin. This is a relatively gentle plain drained by the Rio Lauca. A chain of dormant or extinct volcanoes farther west like Taapaca forms the western margin of the basin and separates the Altiplano from the steep dropoff to the Atacama west of the Lauca basin.

==== Glaciers ====
The old cone was subject to glaciation, and traces of glacial erosion are preserved on its lava flows. A system of moraines can be seen at an elevation of 4,500 metres (14,800 ft) on the southeastern foot of the volcano, where they partly cross the shores of Lake Chungará. Six such 5–10 metres (16–33 ft) high moraines have been identified there, they were formed during the regional Last Glacial Maximum (which did not coincide with the global last glacial maximum) although a pre-last glacial maximum origin has been proposed. Other, unspecified glacial deposits have also been observed in this area.

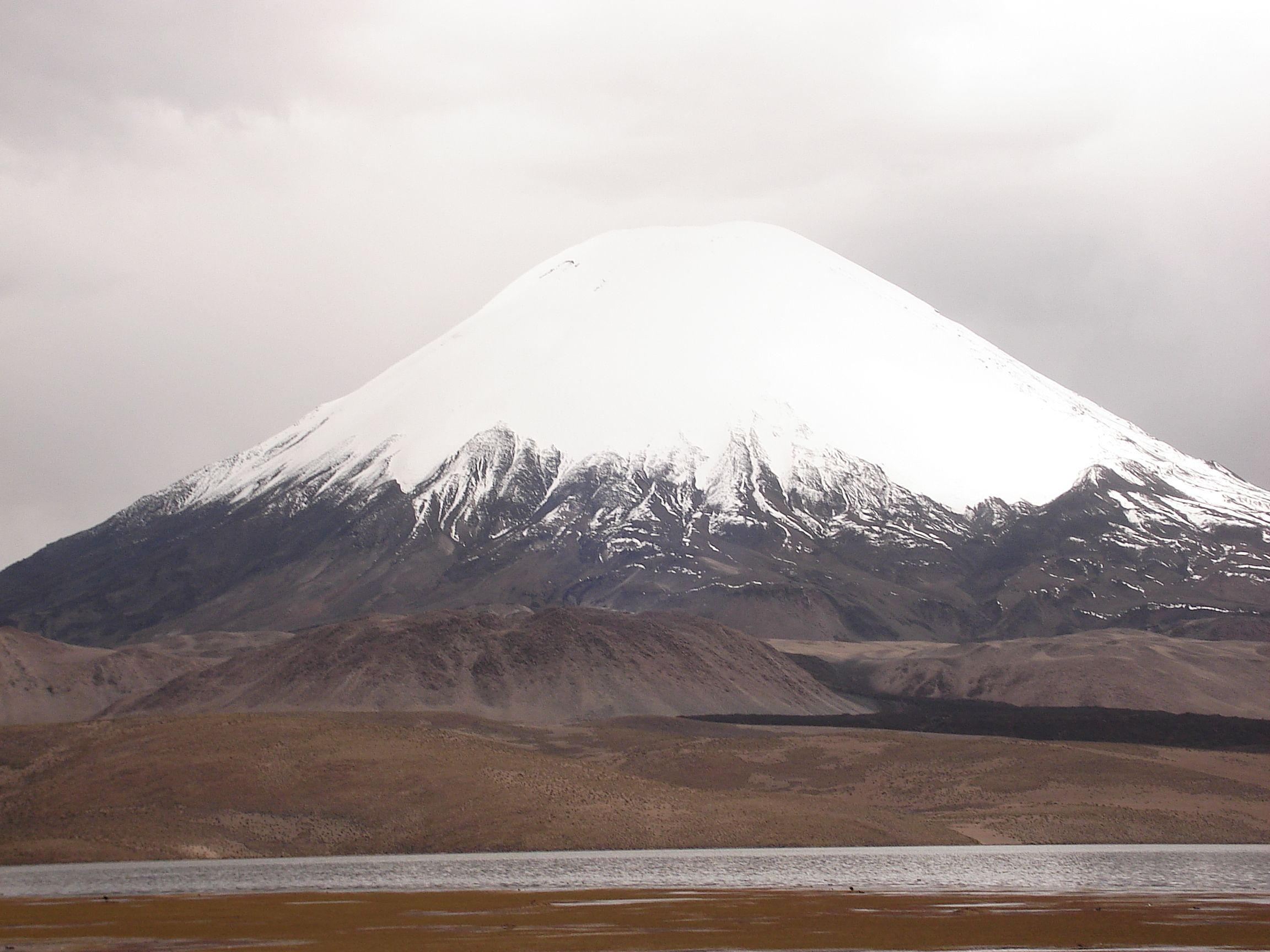
Parinacota with a snowcap

Presently, a 4 square kilometres (1.5 sq mi) or 12 square kilometres (4.6 sq mi) large ice cap covers the upper parts of the volcano and drops down to an elevation of about 5,600 metres (18,400 ft). There is also a large glacier on its southern flank. Some reports disagree with calling any part of Parinacota's ice cap a "glacier", however. Between 1987 and 2016, ice area at Parinacota and Pomerape declined by 1.94% every year. A retreat of 0.9 square kilometres (0.35 sq mi) was noted between 2002 and 2003, and as of 2007 most of the ice lies on the western slope of the mountain.

==== Sector collapse ====
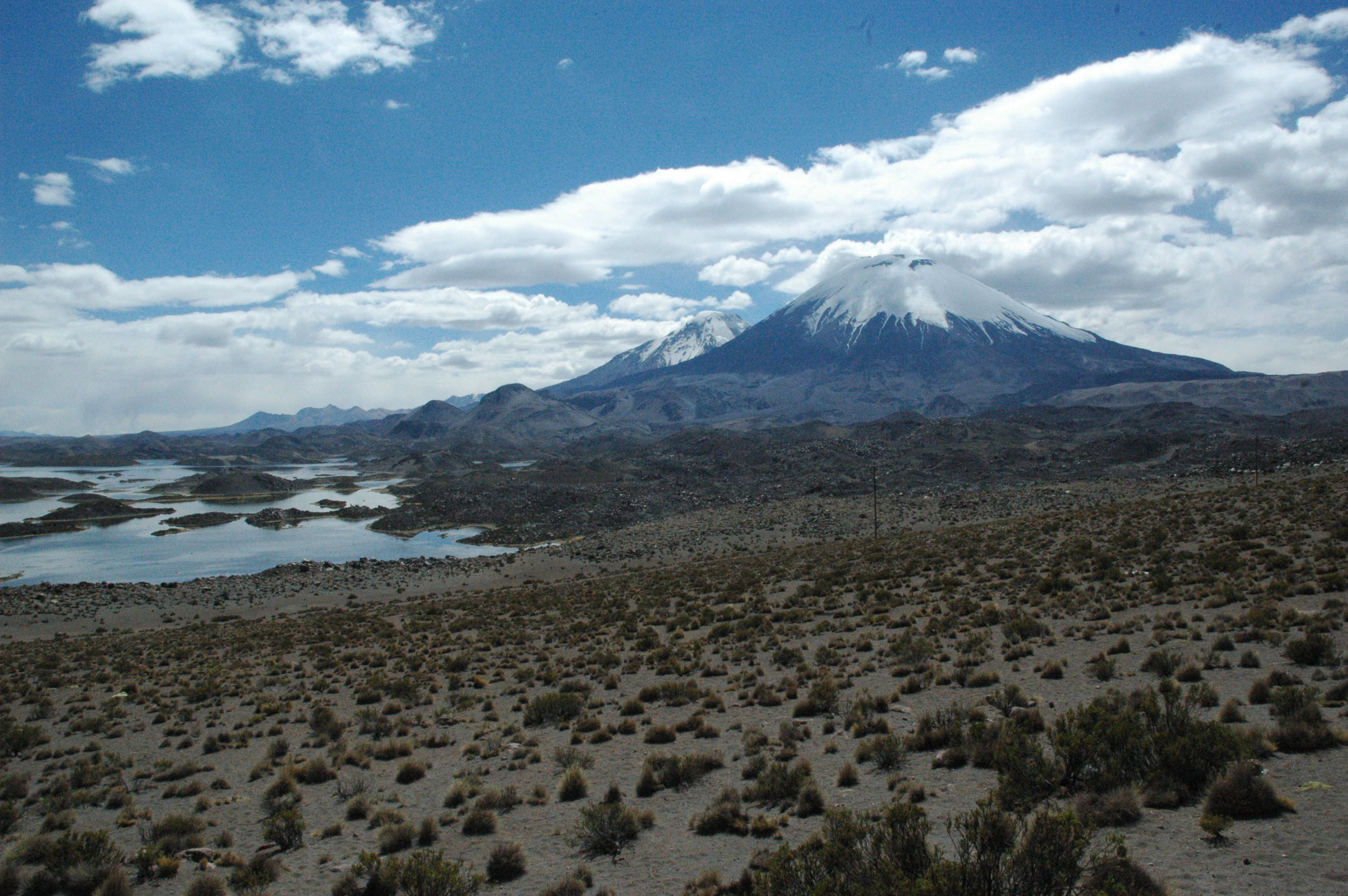
View on the sector collapse deposit. In the background Pomerape, on the left the Cotacotani Lakes

Parinacota shows evidence of a major sector collapse (a giant landslide), whose deposit was originally interpreted to be a lava flow. The collapse removed a volume of about 5–6 cubic kilometres (1.2–1.4 cu mi) from the cone, plunged over 1,900 metres (6,200 ft) vertical distance and flowed 23 kilometres (14 mi) west, covering a surface area of 110 square kilometres (42 sq mi) or 253 square kilometres (98 sq mi) with debris; the volume is not very well established.

As the volcano grew, it put more and more load on relatively weak sedimentary material that the volcano had developed on, deforming it, until these sedimentary rocks gave way. The western slope might have been weakened by glacial action, further facilitating the onset of the collapse. The collapse was probably sequential from the lower part of the edifice to the summit, and it formed an avalanche of rocks that flowed down the volcano. This flow was probably laminar and extremely fast (25–60 metres per second (82–197 ft/s) ), judging from the morphologies of the avalanche deposit, and it incorporated substantial pre-collapse sediments from the Lauca basin. As the avalanche descended the slopes of the volcano, it picked up enough speed to run up on some topographical obstacles. Such collapses have occurred on other volcanoes in the CVZ such as Llullaillaco, Ollagüe, Socompa and Tata Sabaya; the most recent event occurred between 1787 and 1802 at Tutupaca in Peru and was much smaller than the Parinacota sector collapse.

The collapse event resembled the one that occurred on Mount St. Helens during the latter's eruption in 1980, although the Parinacota collapse was three times larger. A separate, minor sector collapse occurred on a lava dome on the southwestern foot of the volcano at an unknown time. Such sector collapses are a common phenomenon on volcanoes.

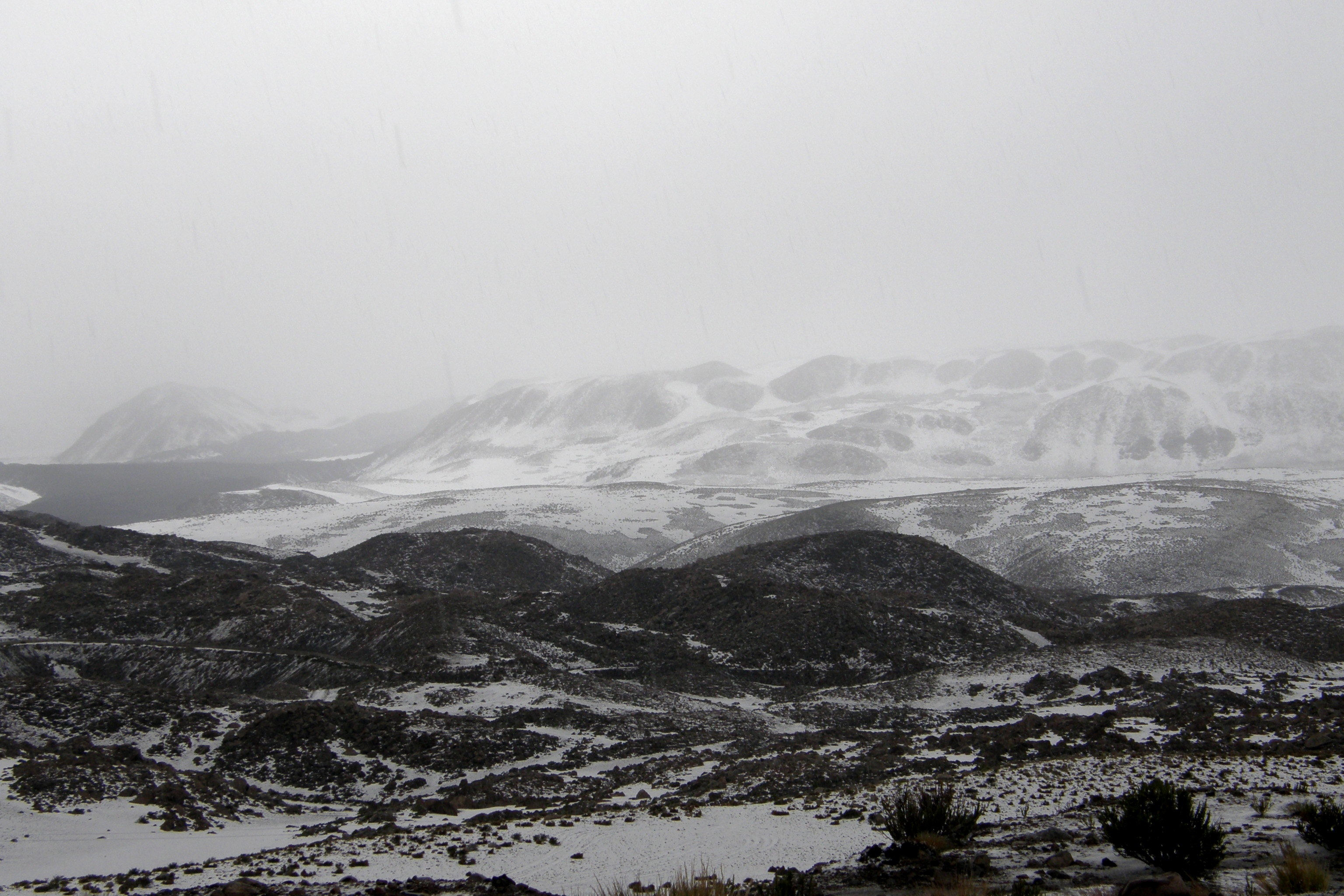
The snow covered collapse deposit

The avalanche eventually came to rest in a large "L" with the long side extending along the axis of the collapse and the short side closer to the edifice pointing north where its advance was limited by tomography, formed an exceptionally well preserved debris avalanche deposit. This deposit has a "hummocky" appearance typical for sector collapse deposits; individual hummocks can reach sizes of 400–500 metres (1,300–1,600 ft) and heights of 80 metres (260 ft), with the size decreasing away from the volcano. The formation of these hummocks was probably influenced by the pre-existing structure of the edifice; much of the original stratigraphy of the pre-collapse edifice was preserved within the final collapse deposit. As the avalanche came to rest, compressional ridges formed with axes perpendicular to the movement of the avalanche. A few large Toreva blocks lie in the avalanche deposit just at the foot of Parinacota, they reach heights of 250 metres (820 ft) and volumes of 0.05 cubic kilometres (0.012 cu mi). Large blocks with sizes of up to 100 metres (330 ft) are part of the deposit, and some of these blocks preserve details of the pre-collapse structure; the blocks reach sizes of 0.5–2 metres (1 ft 8 in – 6 ft 7 in) even at large distances from Parinacota. These large blocks dominate the avalanche deposit; fine material is not present in the Parinacota collapse deposit, an unusual feature among debris avalanches. Some blocks slid away from the main avalanche deposit. The avalanche deposit displays a noticeable split into two units; the upper one is andesitic and originated from the actual cone, the lower one is derived from the lava domes beneath the present-day edifice.

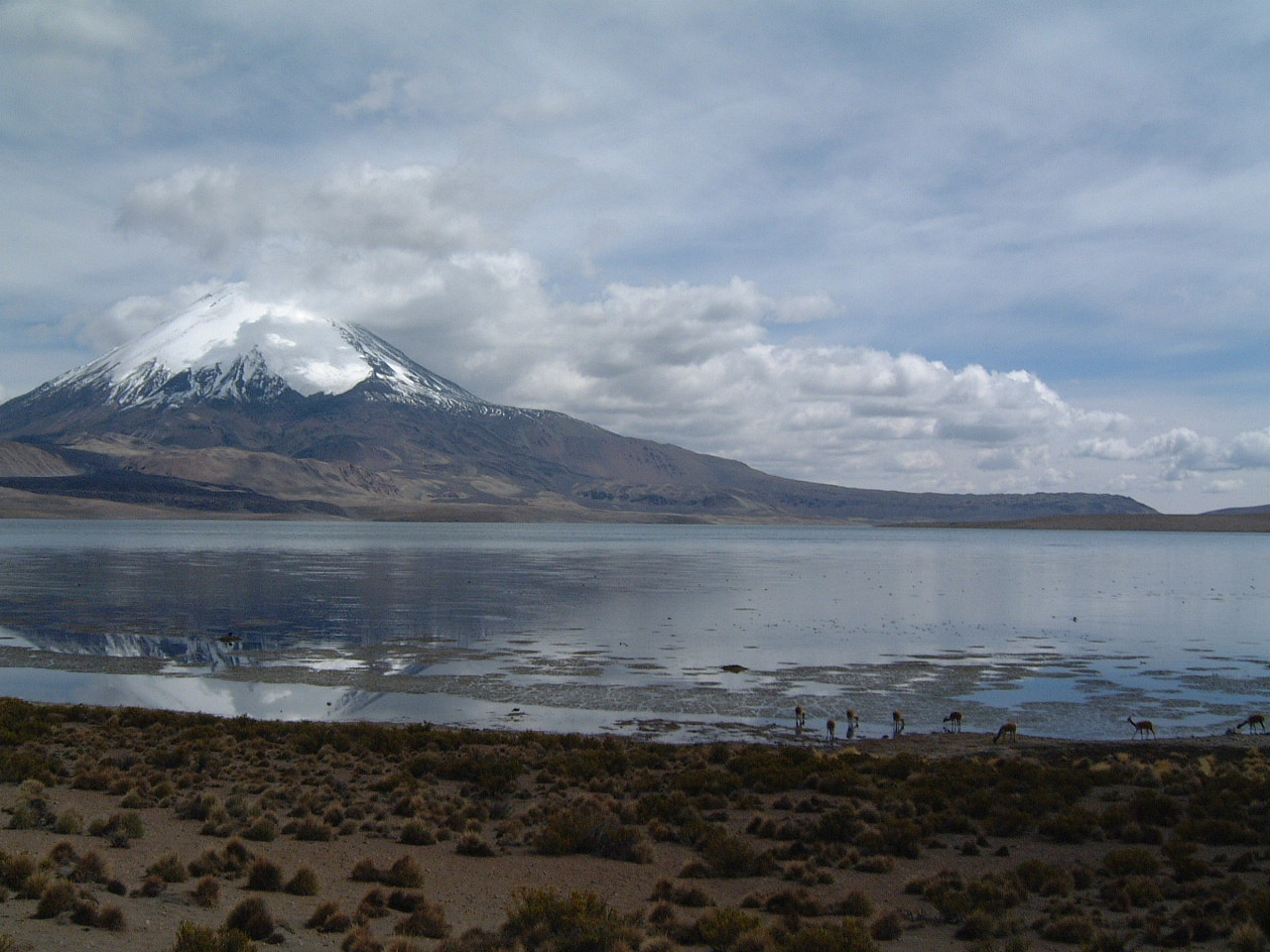
Lake Chungará

This collapse gave birth to Lake Chungará when the avalanche flowed across a westbound drainage between Choquelimpie and Parinacota, forming a 40 metres (130 ft) high volcanic dam that retained about 0.4 cubic kilometres (0.096 cu mi) of water. The formation of lakes during sector collapses has been observed at other volcanoes, including the 1988 Mount St. Helens collapse. Prior to the collapse, alluvial and riverine deposits occupied the area. In 2015 it was proposed that a much smaller lake occupied part of the Lake Chungará basin before the collapse.

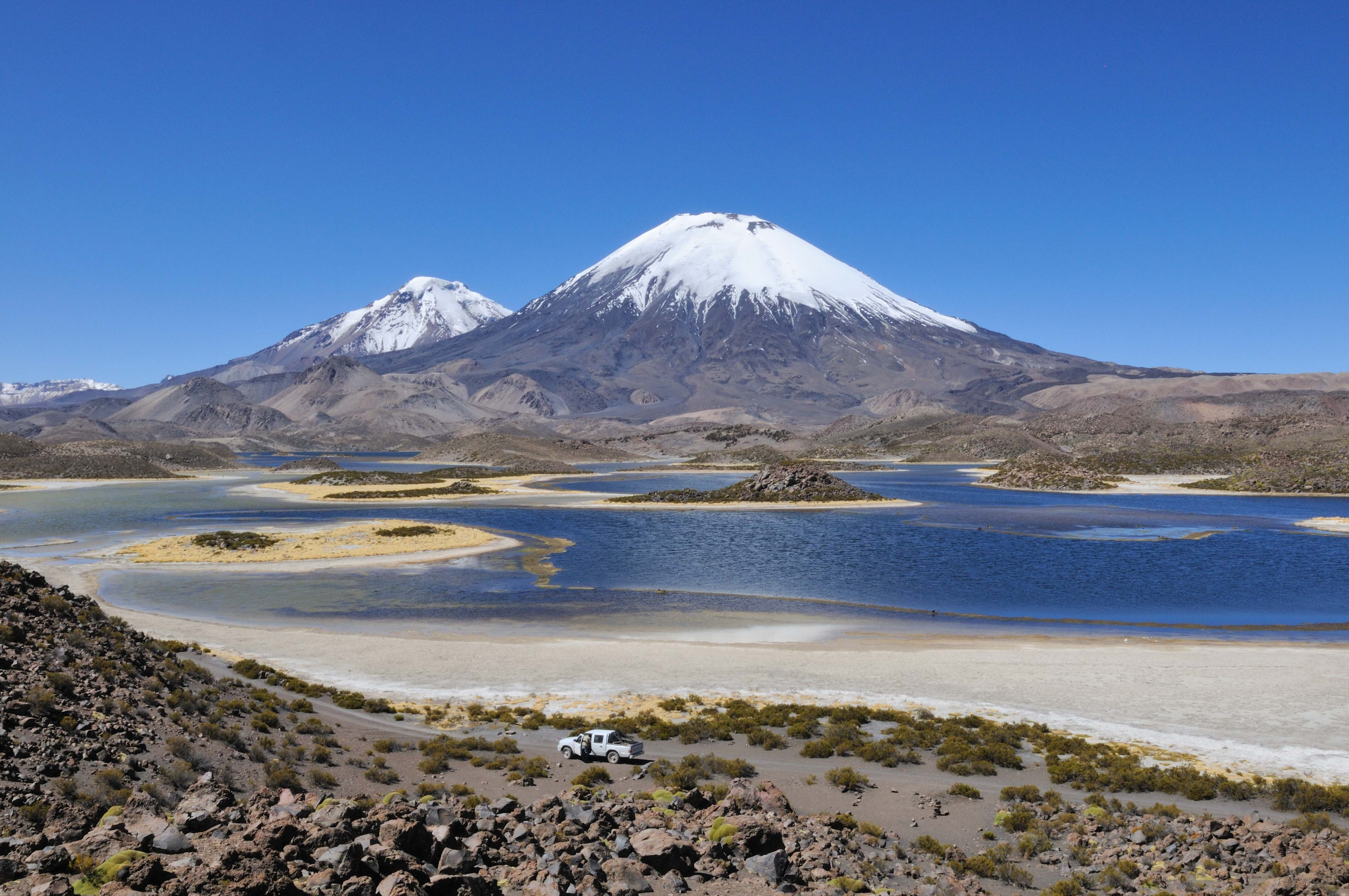
The Lagunas Cotacotani, with Parinacota and Pomerape in the background

Within the hummock-like topography of the deposit, a number of other lakes and peat filled basins are found, formed by water percolating through the avalanche deposit. These lakes are known as the Lagunas Cotacotani lakes, and are an important bird refuge. At least some of these lakes may be kettle holes, formed when blocks of ice transported within the avalanche melted. With increasing distance from the main cone the size of the lakes decreases. Some of these lakes are connected with each other and others are isolated, and during periods of low lake stands some of the lakes can become disconnected from each other. Springs at the foot of Parinacota form the Rio Benedicto Morales which flows through some of the lakes and ends in the main Lake Cotacotani. Otherwise, these lakes receive water from Lake Chungará through seepage. The lakes ultimately form the headwaters of the Rio Lauca, whose course previously extended across the area covered by the avalanche. The river has not carved an outlet all the way to Lake Chungará, probably because the relatively coarse avalanche deposit allows large amounts of water to seep through without carving a new river channel. The rate at which waters seep through the avalanche deposit has been estimated at 25 litres per second (0.88 cu ft/s); it has progressively decreased over time, probably as a consequence of increased siltation within the avalanche deposit. Thus the depth and surface area of Lake Chungará have increased since the formation of the lake, and so has evaporation, which currently removes almost 5/6 of the total inflow.

A pumice fall deposit of dacitic composition is associated with the sector collapse event, which together with lava bombs suggest that an eruption took place at the time of the collapse; this has been contested however. The sector collapse was probably not caused by an eruption, although the intrusion of a cryptodome may have helped. There is no evidence on the edifice for the existence of a collapse scar, indicating that post-collapse volcanic activity has completely filled up the space removed by the collapse. The volcanic edifice has reached a volume similar to its volume before the failure.

==== Surroundings ====
The terrain around Parinacota is mostly formed by Neogene volcanic rocks. These are for the most part over one million years old and include individual volcanic centres such as Caldera Ajoya, Caldera Lauca, Choquelimpie, Condoriri, Guane Guane, Larancagua and Quisiquisini, and the Miocene Lauca ignimbrite (2.7 ± 0.1 million years ago) that forms the basement. The activity of many of these centres occurred over 6.6 million years ago. At slightly larger distances lie the volcanoes Guallatiri, Nevados de Quimsachata and Taapaca. Proterozoic and paleozoic basement rocks crop out as charnockite/granulite east and as amphibolite/gneiss west of the volcano, respectively. Other formations include the volcaniclastic Lupica Formation of Oligocene-Miocene age and the lacustrine Lauca formation.

A number of volcanoes have been active around Parinacota in the last one million years. Pomerape northeast of Parinacota is similar to Parinacota but the greater degrees of erosional decay suggest it is older than Parinacota; a subsidiary vent dated 205,000 years ago is found on its eastern slope. Pomerape is a comparatively simple volcanic cone whose foot is covered by glacial debris. One age obtained on the cone is 106,000 ± 7,000 years ago. The Caquena and Chucullo rhyolitic to andesitic lava domes are found northwest and southwest of Parinacota, respectively; they are associated with the oldest stages of activity at Parinacota.

==== Periglacial and erosional landforms ====
Periglacial landscapes are frequent in the area; they include rounded landforms, smooth surfaces, solifluction terrain and striated terrain. This extensiveness is the result of the relatively dry climate in the region, which limits the development of glaciers. On Parinacota, landforms of this type are found starting from 4,450 metres (14,600 ft) elevation and become dominant above 5,300 metres (17,400 ft) until the glacier line. The extent of their development is a function of the age of the underlying rocks as well; Holocene volcanic rocks have little periglacial alteration while older rock formations at times are heavily altered. Lahars also occurred during the history of Parinacota; 0.2–2 metres (7.9 in – 6 ft 6.7 in) thick layers of lahar deposits are found on the southern and eastern slopes and form a fan on the northwestern slope of Parinacota. At this fan, lahar deposits reach distances of 15 kilometres (9.3 mi) away from the volcano.

Erosion has formed gullies on the upper sector of Parinacota. Otherwise, the volcanic rocks of Parinacota are well preserved owing to the arid climate and the youth of the volcano.

=== Petrology ===
Volcanic rocks erupted by Parinacota range in composition from basaltic andesite to rhyolite. Andesites from the old cone are classified as hornblende and pyroxene andesites. Minerals found within the rocks include amphibole, apatite, biotite, clinopyroxene, iron oxide and titanium oxide, feldspar, olivine, orthopyroxene, pyroxene, sanidine and zircon. Not all of these minerals are found in rocks from all stages of Parinacota. Some of these minerals, such as quartz and sanidine, were at least in part formed by the inclusion of foreign rocks into the magma. Gabbro and granite are found as xenoliths.

Overall, volcanic rocks at Parinacota belong to a potassium-rich calc-alkaline suite. The volcanites have characteristically high contents of barium and strontium, especially in the youngest Ajata rocks where their concentration is higher than in any other CVZ volcanic rock. A trend to a more tholeiitic composition in younger eruptions may reflect an increased magma flux and a decreased interaction with the upper crust.

The magmas that formed Parinacota and Pomerape are considered to be a group distinct from these that formed older volcanic centres in the region, but also distinct from the magmas that formed the subsidiary vent of Pomerape and the Ajata cones; these tend to be more mafic. In turn, the younger and older Ajata cone lavas have different compositions, one having a high quantity of strontium and the other a low one.

Magmas in the Parinacota region formed through distinct processes. One of these is fractional crystallization within closed magma chambers. Another is the mixing of different magmas, one of which in the case of Parinacota may be the Ajata magmas. More specifically, two different magmas with compositions akin to the Ajata magmas contributed the mafic element to the Parinacota magmas. Some differences in magma composition between various volcanoes and stages may reflect the occurrence of several different magma differentiation events.

Processes within magma chambers play an important role in the formation of the magmas erupted by volcanoes. The diversity of the petrographic patterns suggest that Parinacota did not have a single major magma chamber, but rather various magma reservoirs at various depths and with variable interconnection patterns. Some Ajata magmas bypassed the shallow reservoirs completely. Starting about 28,000 years ago however several different magma systems consolidated into one, probably as a result of more frequent injections of new magma and/or the accumulation of cumulates that insulated the magmatic system. The transit of the magmas through the conduit system probably takes several ten thousand years, and the residence time within magma chambers could be on the order of 100,000 years.

In the case of Parinacota, there is a noticeable difference between the pre-sector collapse and post-sector collapse magmas, indicating that a large turnover of the magmatic system was triggered by the landslide. More specifically, after the collapse erupted rocks became more mafic and their composition more influenced by fractional crystallization, while the preceding magmas were more strongly affected by mixing processes. Also, magma output increased significantly, while the resting time in the magma chambers decreased. Modelling indicates that over the short term, a collapse would cause activity to stop at a volcano of Parinacota's size, and over the long term the plumbing system would change and become shallower. Also, the plumbing system of the volcano would become more permissive to denser mafic magmas after a sector collapse, perhaps explaining why the Ajata vents were active after the collapse but the magma erupted through them influenced petrogenesis of main cone magmas much earlier. The magnitude of such changes is considerably larger than at neighbouring volcano Taapaca, where a sector collapse was not accompanied by changes in activity; presumably Parinacota's shallower magma supply system made it more susceptible to the effects of unloading.

The source of the Parinacota magmas is ultimately the mantle wedge above the slab of the Nazca Plate. Fluids released from the slab flux the wedge and trigger the formation of melts, with the assistance of asthenospheric material that is hotter and gets transported into the wedge. These ascending magmas then interact with the crust, resulting in extensive changes to their composition. The area in the crust where such interaction takes place is known as "MASH" or "Melting Assimilation Storage Homogenization", and it is there that the base magmas are formed which then enter into shallow magmatic systems. Further, the relative thickness of the crust and narrowness of the mantle wedge mean that garnet is stable within the wedge, causing the magmas to be influenced by garnet-linked petrogenic processes. Shallower crustal components such as the locally extensive Lauca-Perez ignimbrite may have been assimilated by Parinacota as well. These crustal components contributed about 12% of the primitive magmas as erupted by the Ajata cones, while the mantle wedge contributed 83%. Fluids from the slab and sediments subducted in the Peru-Chile Trench added the remaining 3 and 2%.

== Climate ==
Average temperatures at Parinacota are about 2.5–6 °C (36.5–42.8 °F), with the 0 °C (32 °F) isotherm hovering between 4,800–4,900 metres (15,700–16,100 ft) elevation. On neighbouring Sajama, on the summit temperatures range −7.5 – −14 °C (18.5–6.8 °F). The atmosphere becomes thinner and drier at higher altitudes, allowing both increased solar radiation to reach the surface during daytime and more thermal radiation from the ground to escape to the top of the atmosphere during night. This pattern determines a large diurnal temperature amplitude in the region, with variations on the scale of 20–16 °C (36–29 °F).

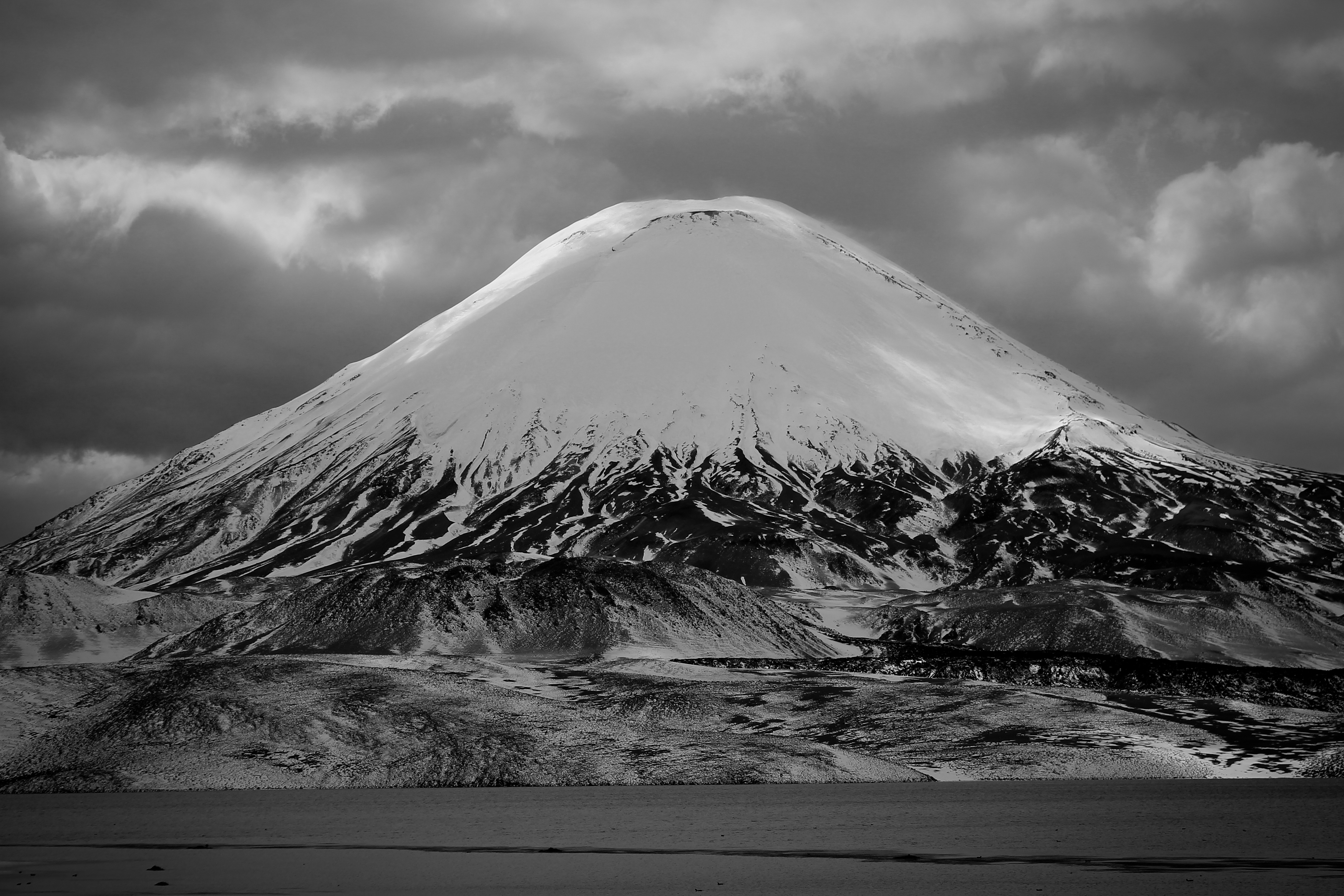
Parinacota after snowfall

Average precipitation at Parinacota is about 440 millimetres per year (17 in/year). Between about 12 and 26° degrees southern latitude, most of the moisture that arrives was absorbed by winds over the Amazon and transported to the Andes. Thus, humidity increases from west to east, with the Pacific coastline being particularly dry. Parinacota lies within the puna seca climate region, where precipitation occurs over 7 or 8 months of wet season and results in a total amount of 500–250 millimetres per year (19.7–9.8 in/year), most of it falling during the summer months when the Altiplano warms up under the sun, generating a monsoon-like wind current. The summer precipitation is also known as the "Bolivian winter" or "Altiplanic winter". This is an unusual precipitation pattern for Chile; most of the country has a mediterranean climate where most precipitation occurs during the winter months.

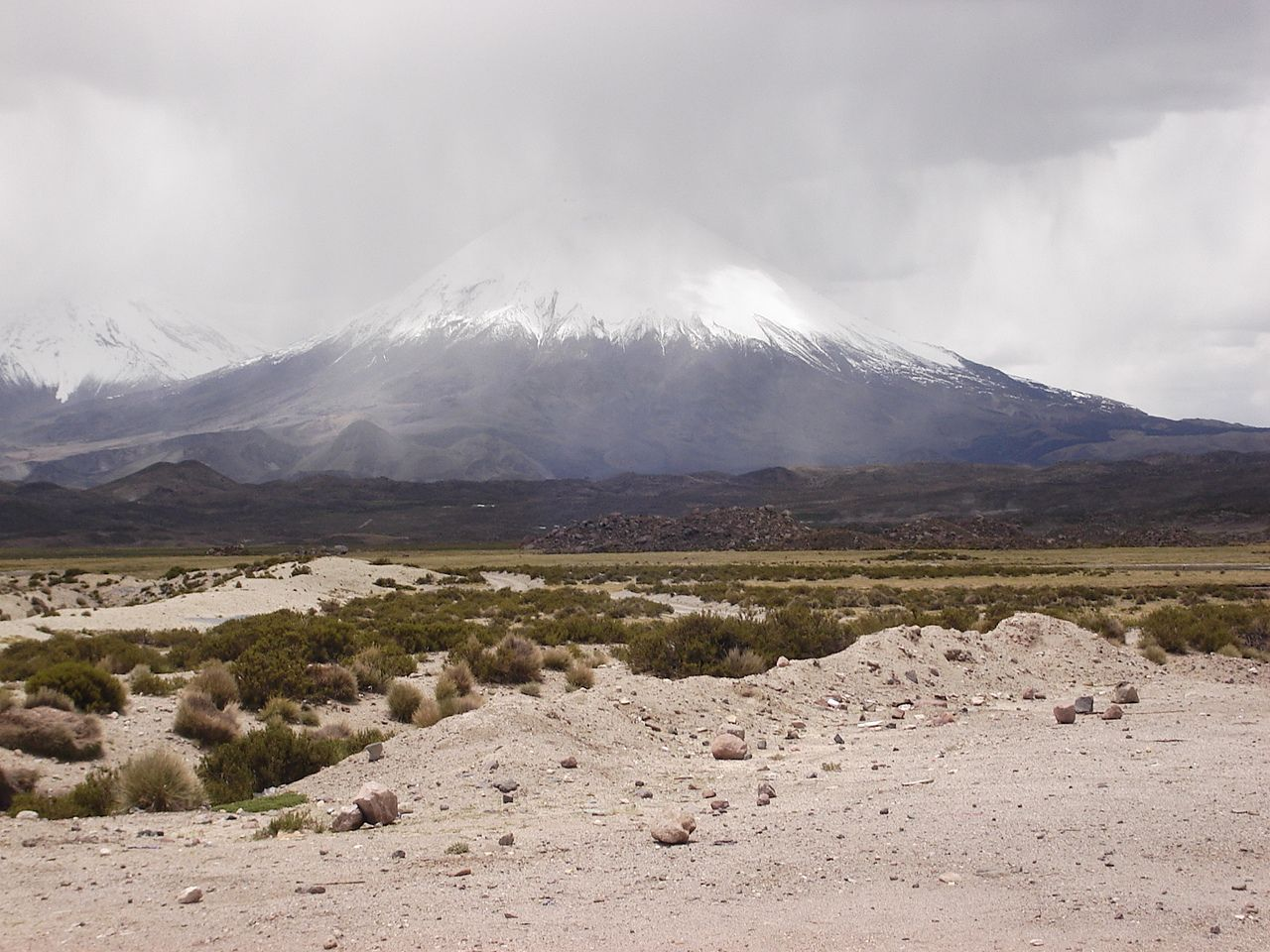
Cloudy Parinacota

The arid climate is a consequence of the activity of the South Pacific High just off the coast, the rain shadow effect of the Andes and the cold Humboldt Current in the Pacific Ocean. The dry climate became apparent in the region 10–15 million years ago. The generally arid climate of the region means that volcanoes can remain topographically recognizable for a long time, being subject to only minimal erosion. Likewise, the groundwater pools in the region tend to be fairly old, going back to 13,000–12,000 years ago. The climate was not always so dry in the past; around 28,000 years ago and between 13,000 and 8,200 years ago a wet period was accompanied by advances of glaciers. The middle Holocene was dry, after 4,000 years before present climate became wetter again. Because of the aridity, relatively little sediment is flushed into the Peru-Chile Trench from land, which has effects on the tectonics of the region and the chemistry of the magmas erupted in the volcanoes.

Winds at Parinacota come generally from the west, except during the wet season when easterly winds are common. This wind pattern is controlled by the formation of a high-pressure area and a shift of the subtropical jet stream to the south.

== Flora and fauna ==
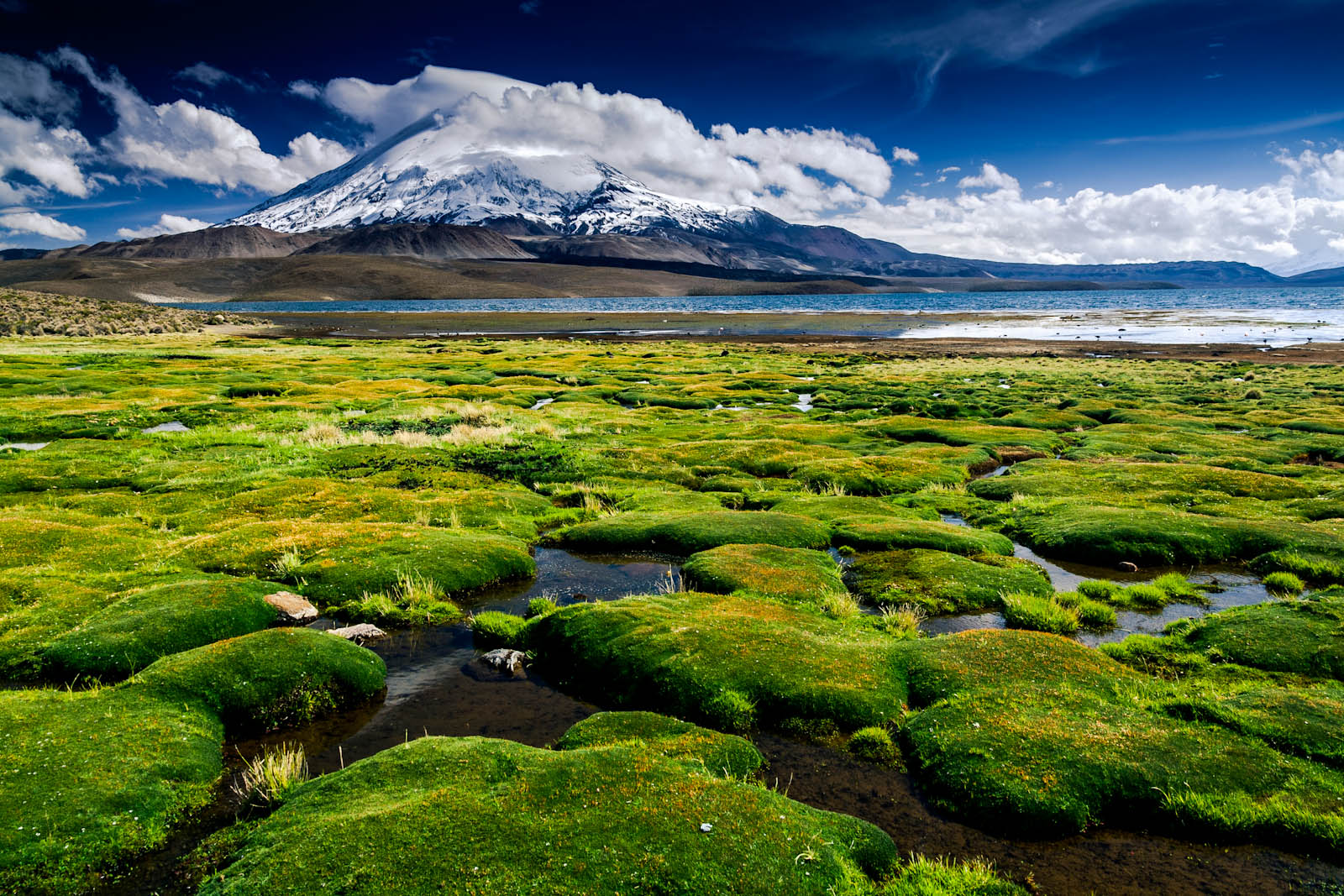
Plant communities in front of Lake Chungará

The Andes are a long mountain chain with different climates at various latitudes and elevations. Thus, vegetation differs from one location to the other. In the region of Parinacota, between 3,400–4,600 metres (11,200–15,100 ft) altitude the vegetation is formed by shrub steppe such as Baccharis incarum, Baccharis tola, Fabiana densa; the dominant species are Deyuexia breviaristata, Festuca orthophylla, Parastrephia lucida and Parastrphia quadrangularis. During the wet season, this vegetation is augmented by herbaceous plants. Above 4,000 metres (13,000 ft) a grass vegetation dominates, which on rocky ground occasionally gives way to cushion vegetation such as Azorella compacta, whose yellow colour is characteristic and can be seen from large distances. This type of xeric vegetation is also known as "puna". Herbs and shrubs reach elevations of 5,200 metres (17,100 ft). Polylepis tarapacana is the only true tree found at high elevations (up to 5,100 metres (16,700 ft)) and forms small woods. Close to water, the bofedal marsh-like vegetation prevails, with Oxychloe andina being the dominant species. Some genera and species are endemic to the puna; they include Chilotrichiops, Lampaya, Parastrephia and Oreocerus.

| Vegetation zone | Species |
|---|---|
| Wet sandy soils | Ephedra breana, Festuca, Pennisetum, Werneria glaberrima |
| Brackish and wet soils | Festuca orthophylla, Festuca scirpifolia, Poa |
| Wetlands and impermeable soils | Carex, Festuca scirphifolia, Oxychloe andina |
Some species in the grass vegetation area

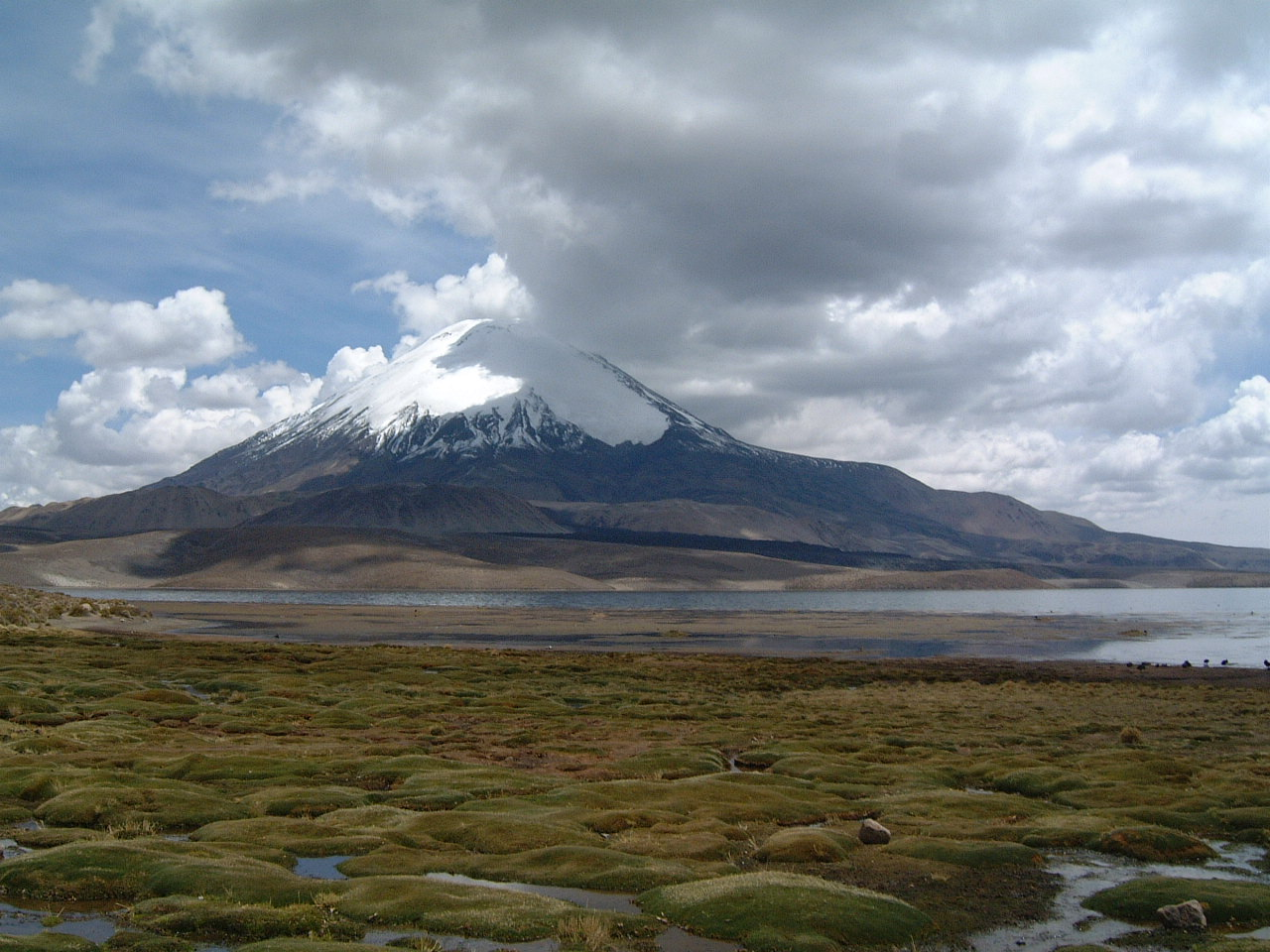

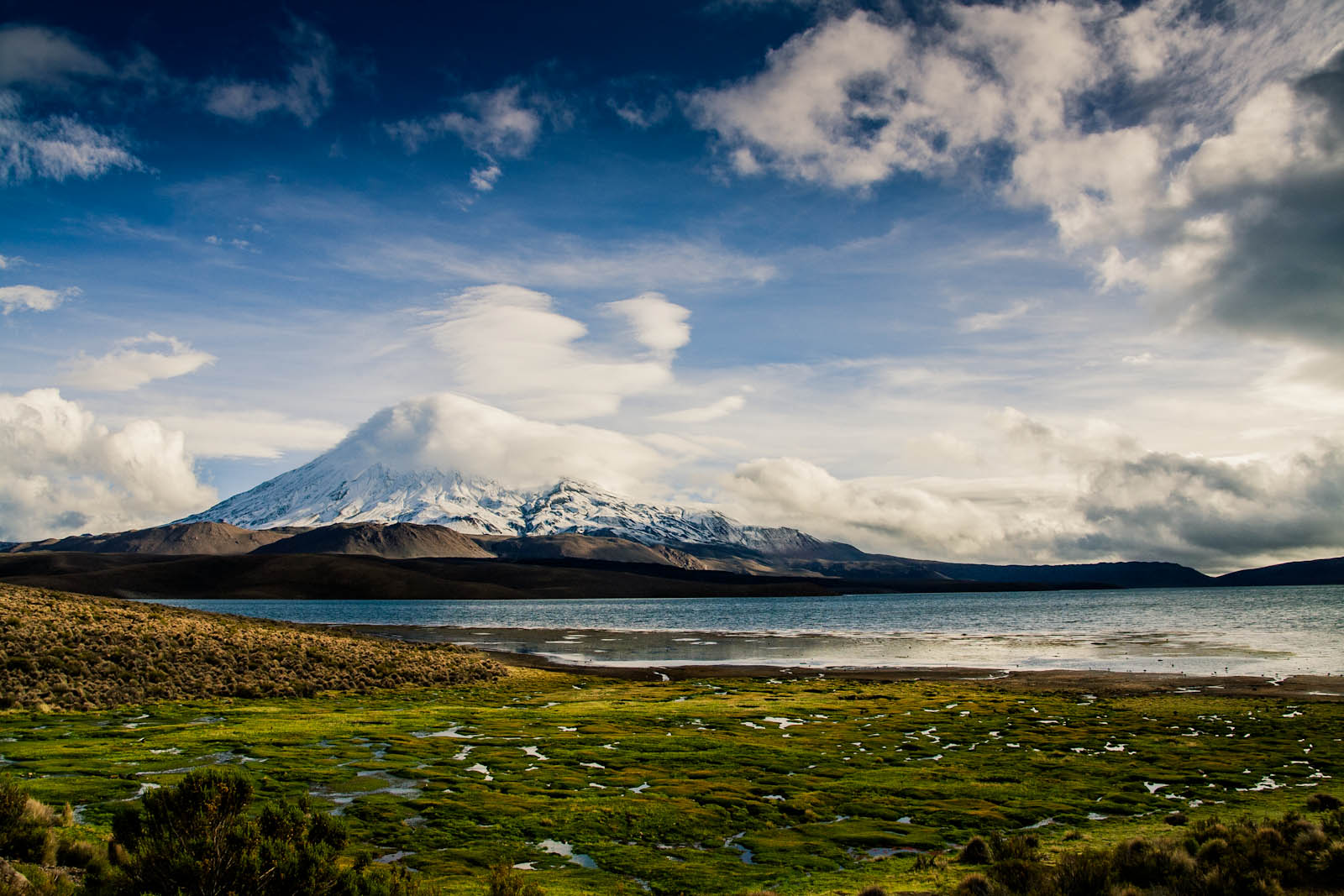
Vegetation at Lake Chungará; the summit of Parinacota is enveloped in a cloud

Among the ecological factors that determine vegetation in the region are lack of water, saline soils, plentiful solar irradiation, herbivores, wind and cold nighttime temperatures. These plant species which release airborne pollen can often be identified in samples taken from Parinacota's icecap, where winds deposit the pollen grains.

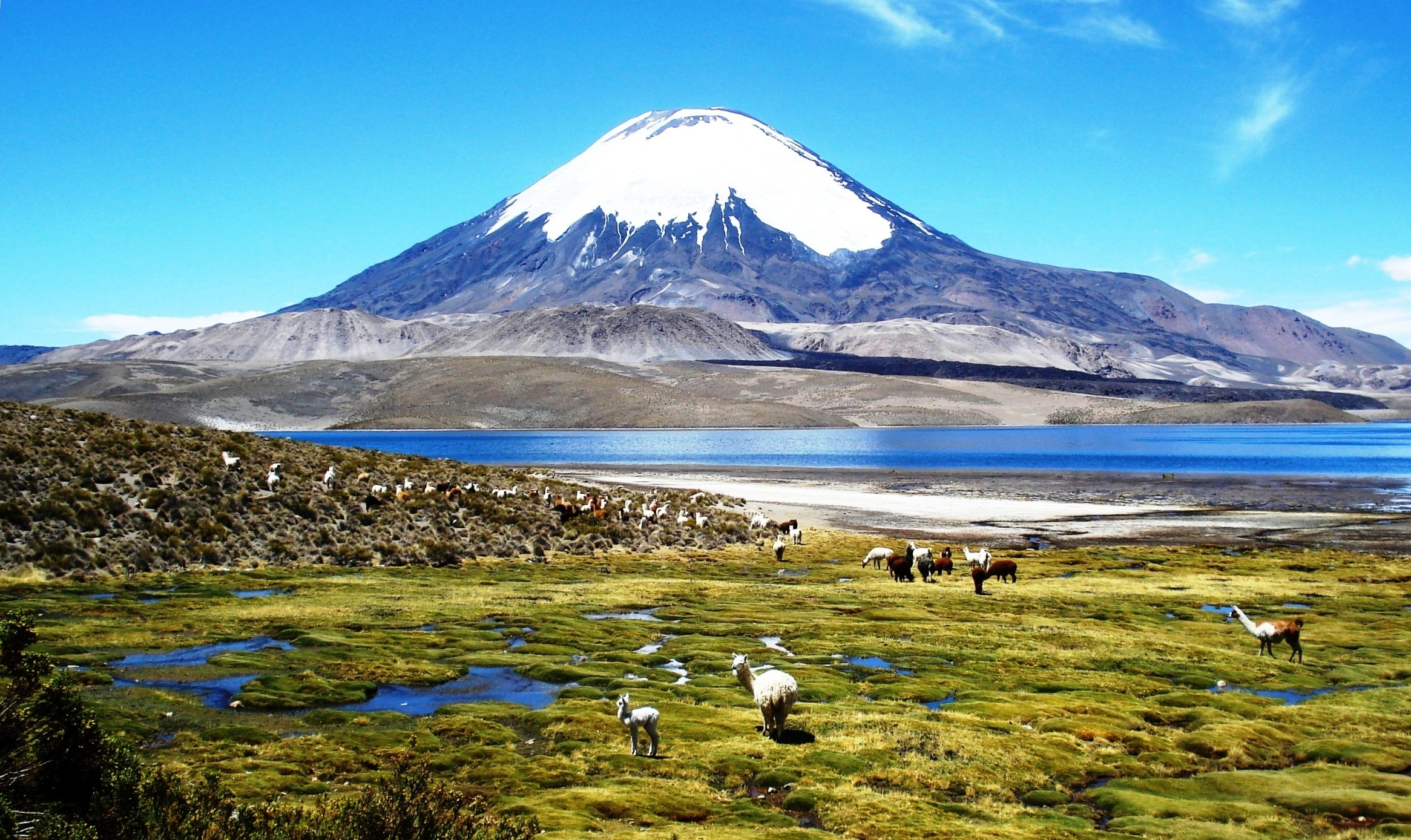
Animals in front of Lake Chungará

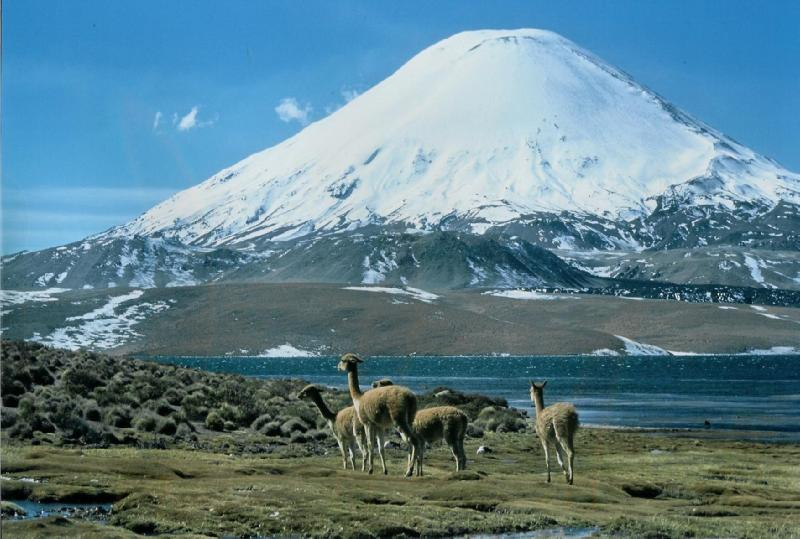
Animals in front of Lake Chungará

Animal species that live around Parinacota include flamingo, guanaco, huemul, rhea, vicuña and viscacha. Among predatory animals feature the Andean cat, the pampas cat and the puma. The most abundant animal species however are rodents, some of which can be found up to the highest treelines and which include the viscacha and the burrowing tuco-tuco. Also important are birds, such as the rhea, the tinamous, flamingos and various predatory and wetland birds, including the Andean condor.

Many mammal species in the area were decimated in the past, although some have displayed a recent recovery in numbers. Parinacota and surroundings in 1965 were made part of the Lauca National Park, which was further modified in 1970 and 1983 and is an UNESCO biosphere reserve. This natural preserve features a unique flora and fauna for Chile. However, potential future water diversions from Lake Chungará, the hunting of indigenous animals, overharvesting of the vegetation, overgrazing and the existence of a major border-crossing highway close to Lake Chungará constitute ongoing threats to the environment around Parinacota.

Lake Chungará adds to the local flora and fauna. These include charophytes, diatoms and aquatic macrophyte plants. Animal taxa found in the lake include bivalves, gastropods and ostracods. About 19 species of Orestias fish are found in the lake, some of which are endemic. The speciation of Orestias chungarensis, Orestias laucaensis and Orestias piacotensis was aided by the volcanic activity of Parinacota and its collapse, which separated the watersheds inhabited by their ancestor species and caused allopatric speciation.

== Eruptive history ==
Parinacota underwent five separate stages of volcanic activity. A relatively young age of the last eruption is presumed considering the good preservation of volcanic landforms, such as lava flows and the summit crater; SERNAGEOMIN considers it the most active volcano of the Central Andes by magma output. The high magma output may be facilitated by the presence of faults that facilitate the rising of magma; the Condoriri lineament in the area could be the fault that channels magma to Parinacota. The injection of mafic magmas into magma chambers and the mixing between magmas of different composition has been held responsible for the onset of eruptions at many volcanoes including Parinacota.

=== Chungará Andesites and lava domes ===
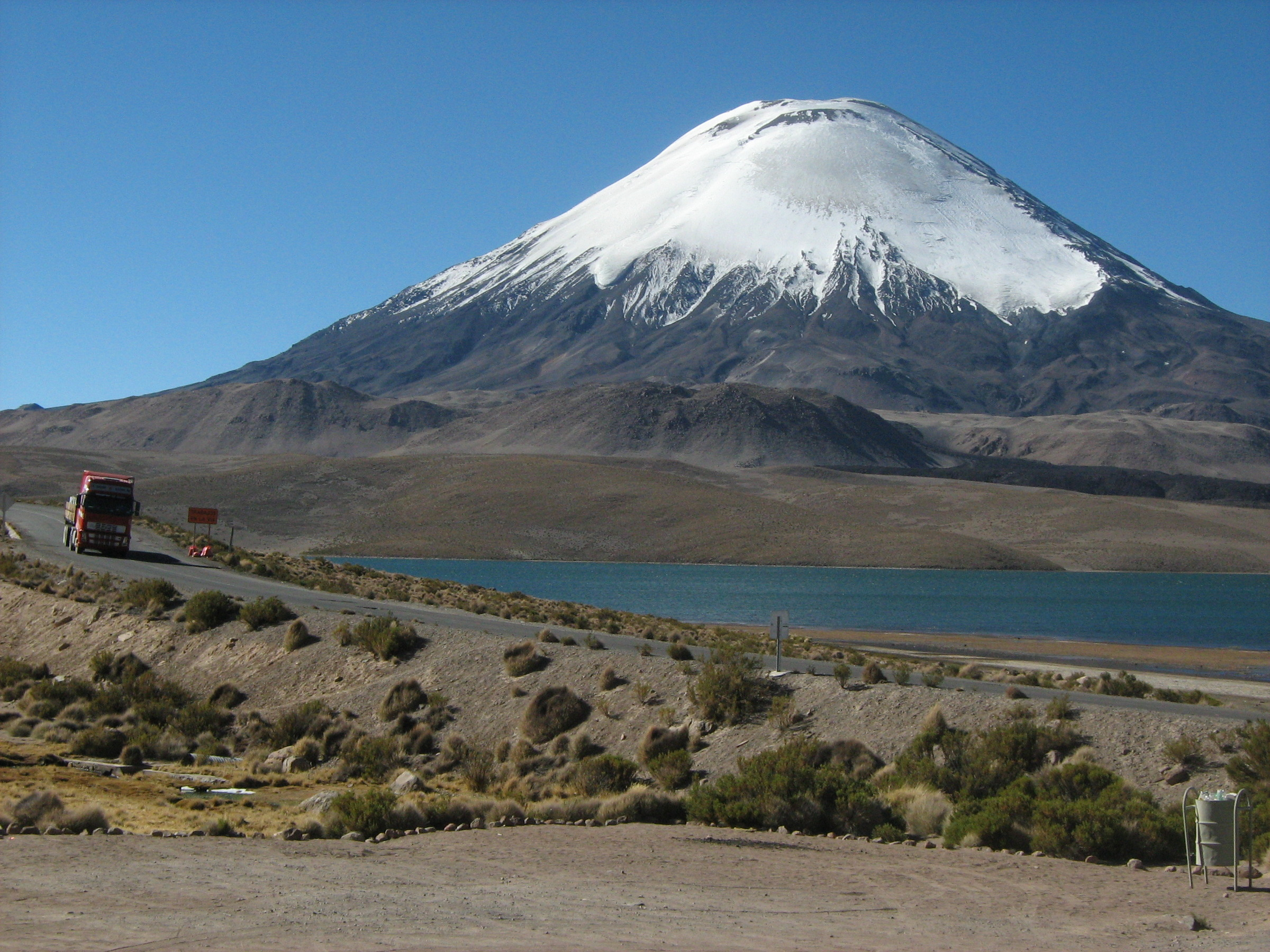
The lava domes are visible as grey hills

The oldest volcanic structure of Parinacota are the "Chungará Andesites" and the overlying lava dome, which form the platform that crops out on the southern side of the Parinacota volcano, facing Lake Chungará. Erosion and glacial action has smoothed the surfaces of these rocks, leaving no primary textures.

This platform was erupted between 300,000 and 100,000 years ago. The finer subdivision defines the "Chungará Andesites" as having erupted 163,000–117,000 years ago and the "Rhyolite domes" being 52,000–42,000 years old. Other dates obtained on these stages are 110,000 ± 4,000 and 264,000 ± 30,000 years ago for the Chungará Andesites and over 112,000 ± 5,000 for the "rhyolite domes". These two units are also called "Parinacota 1". A hiatus of over 60,000 years occurred between the eruption of the "Chungará Andesites" and the formation of the lava dome plateau. Traces of explosive activity during the lava dome stage have been found.

The "Chungará Andesites" have a volume of over 4 cubic kilometres (0.96 cu mi); material from these stages was incorporated in the collapse deposit. Pomerape volcano developed during this time as well. This and the long delay between the eruption of the Chungará Andesites and the rest of the volcano's history may imply that the magmatic systems involved were different. Magma output during the early stage was low, with a magma output of 0.13 cubic kilometres per year (0.031 mi^{3}/a) with the dome growth contributing 0.5 ± 0.18 cubic kilometres per year (0.120 ± 0.043 mi^{3}/a).

=== Old Cone and sector collapse ===
At the same time as the lava domes were emplaced, the Old Cone started growing a short distance northwest of the domes. The temporal gap between this stage of Parinacota's activity and the previous one may be because the deposits from this time interval are only poorly preserved. The Old Cone developed over 85,000 years until the sector collapse, and is also known as Parinacota 2. Outcrops of this stage are found mostly low on the southeastern and north-northwestern slopes; individual dates obtained on rocks from this stage are 20,000 ± 4,000, 46,700 ± 1,600, and 53,000 ± 11,000 years ago. The "Border Dacites" also belong to this stage, being dated at 28,000 ± 1,000 years ago. Likewise, ash fall deposits found in the Cotacotani lakes have been dated to this period of volcanic history, indicating that the Old Cone occasionally featured explosive eruptions. This stage erupted andesite and dacite in the form of three distinct suites. Magma output during this time was about 0.46 ± 0.11 cubic kilometres per year (0.110 ± 0.026 mi^{3}/a). This also was a time of glacier growth and development in the region, and consequently a glacier cap developed on the Old Cone during this time. By the time of the sector collapse, the glaciers were already retreating.

The date of the collapse is not known with certainty, because dates have been obtained on various materials with different stratigraphic interpretations. As of 2007 18,000 years ago was considered the most likely estimate, but ages as young as 8,000 years ago were also proposed. Radiocarbon dates from peat within the collapse deposit indicated an age of 13,500 years ago, or 11,500–13,500 years ago. Many dates were obtained on material predating the collapse that was embedded within the collapse deposit, and thus the most likely time for the collapse was considered to be 8,000 years ago. Later research indicated an age between 13,000 and 20,000 years ago, the most recent proposal is 8,800 ± 500 years before present.

The postulated period coincides with a global clustering of volcano collapse events; perhaps global warming occurring during this time when the last glacial maximum approached its end predisposed volcanoes to collapse. On the other hand, the younger dates of around 8,000 years ago significantly post-date the end of glaciation, thus if the collapse occurred at that time it was probably unrelated to glacial fluctuations. This collapse and the collapse of Socompa farther south may have affected humans in the region.

=== Young cone and Ajata ===
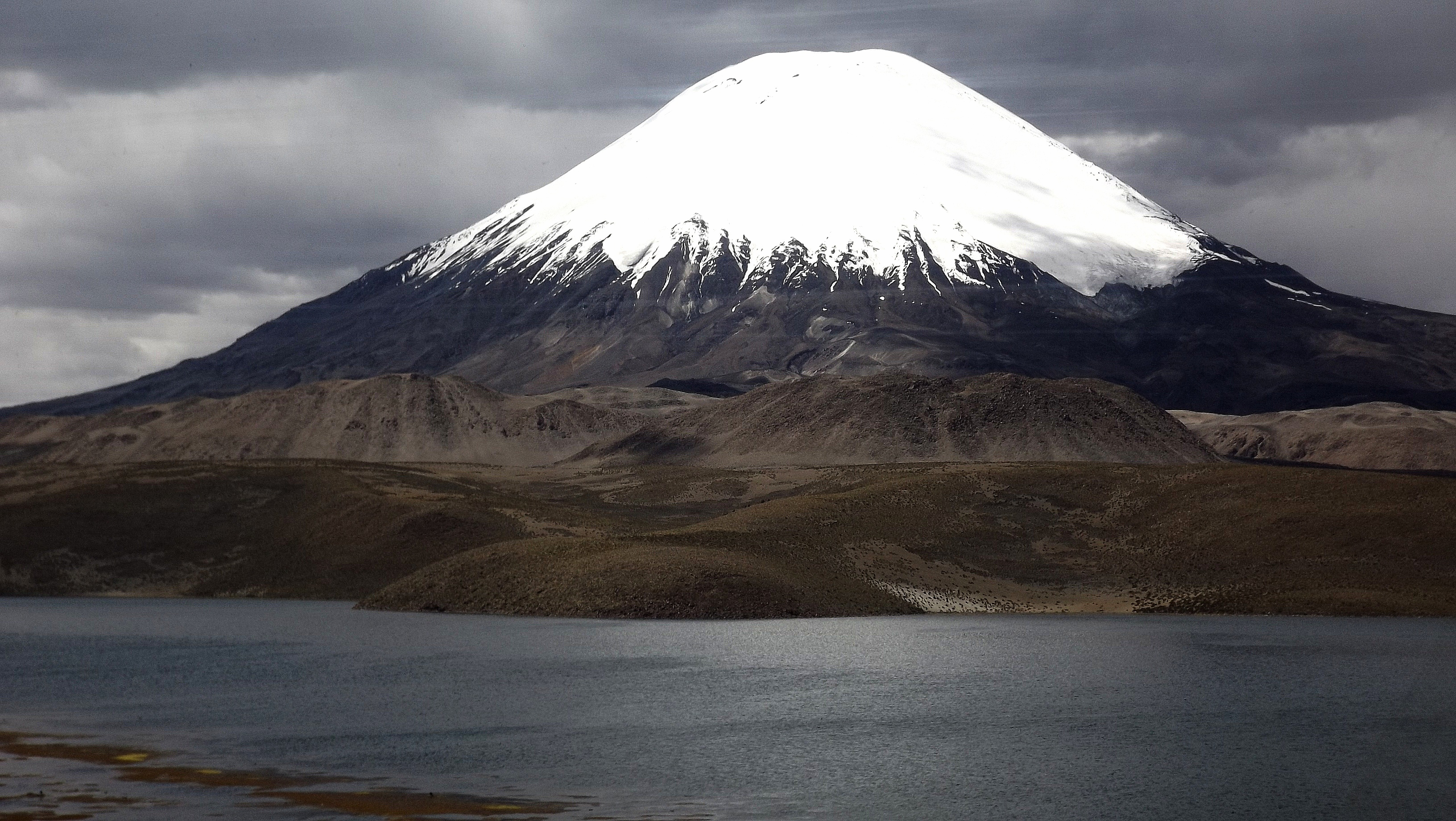
The young cone, in the foreground are lava domes from the plateau stage

After the collapse, the cone was relatively rapidly rebuilt during the Young Cone stage reaching a total volume of approximately 15 cubic kilometres (3.6 cu mi). The units erupted during this time are also known as the "healing flows" or Parinacota 3. During this stage, volcanic activity was focused on the summit crater. This stage was relatively short and accompanied by an increase in the magma output of Parinacota to 2–0.75 cubic kilometres per year (0.48–0.18 mi^{3}/a) depending on how the duration of this stage is measured. The higher magma flux is comparable to peak output by other large stratovolcanoes. The maximum possible magma flux at Parinacota during this period is about 10 cubic kilometres per year (2.4 mi^{3}/a).

Apart from lava flows, sub-Plinian eruptions generated pumice and scoria flows, with some individual explosive eruptions dated to 4,800 ± 800, 4,300 ± 2,600 and 3,600 ± 1,100 years ago. Based on the patterns of tephra deposition in Lake Chungará, it is inferred that the rate of explosive activity increased after the early Holocene until recent times; in addition, tephra falls contributed calcium to the lake waters and impacted its biological productivity. It has been proposed that dust particles found in ice cores at Nevado Sajama may actually be tephra from Parinacota.

Various Holocene dates have been obtained from rocks on the southern flank of the Young Cone; the youngest date for this stage was obtained by argon-argon dating: 500 ± 300 years ago. Further, an age of less than 200 BP has been determined by radiocarbon dating for a pyroclastic flow.

Other recent activity, originally considered to be the youngest, formed the Ajata cones. These cones are constructed by basaltic andesite with a volume of about 0.2 cubic kilometres (0.048 cu mi). The Ajata cones form four groups of different ages: The lower Ajata flows were erupted 5,985 ± 640 and 6,560 ± 1,220 years ago, the upper Ajata flows 4,800 ± 4,000 years ago, the middle Ajata flows 9,900 ± 2,100 years ago, and the High Ajata flows 2,000 – 1,300 years ago. These groups also form compositionally distinct units. The youngest surface exposure date obtained is 1,385 ± 350 years ago.

According to SERNAGEOMIN, Aymara legends referencing volcanic activity imply a latest eruption date of 1800 AD. One history narrating of a bearded man, son of the Sun, that was mistreated by a local town head with the exception of a woman and her son. They were warned that a great disaster would happen, and as they fled from the town it was destroyed by fire. Details of the story imply that the story might reference a small explosive eruption that sent a pyroclastic flow into Lake Chungará after the time of the Spanish conquest; the theory that it references the sector collapse conversely appears to be unlikely.

== Present-day activity and hazards ==
Presently, Parinacota is dormant, but future volcanic activity is possible. Explicit fumarolic activity has not been observed, but satellite imaging has shown the evidence of thermal anomalies on the scale of 6 K (11 °F), and reports of sulfurous smells at the summit imply that a fumarole may exist in the summit area. The volcano is seismically active including one potential seismic swarm, but earthquake activity is less than at Guallatiri farther south. Based on Landsat Thematic Mapper images, it was considered a potentially active volcano in 1991. A small explosion was reported in 2016.

The volcano is one among ten volcanoes in northern Chile monitored by SERNAGEOMIN and has a volcano hazard level published. The relatively low population density on the Bolivian side of the volcano means that renewed activity would not constitute a major threat there, although the town of Sajama may be affected. The Arica-La Paz highway runs close to the volcano and might be threatened by mud and debris flows, along with small communities in the area. Communities close to the volcano include Caquena, Chucullo and Parinacota. Potential hazards from future activity include the development of lahars from interactions between magma and the ice cap, pyroclastic flows especially on the southern flank, and eruptions from the flank vents; ash fall from prolonged flank vent eruptions could disturb pastures in the region. The important natural preserve that is the Lauca National Park could suffer significant disruption from renewed eruptions of Parinacota.

== Human history and cultural value ==
The region around Parinacota has been inhabited for about 7,000–10,000 years. Politically, since 1,000 years ago first Tiwanaku and then the Inka ruled over the region. Sources disagree on whether there are archaeological sites on the summit of Parinacota.

Several legends concern Parinacota and its sister mountain Pomerape, which are often portrayed as unmarried sisters. Some involve a dispute with or between the mountains Tacora and Sajama, often resulting in Tacora being driven off. Parinacota is one among several volcanoes that figure on the Chilean passport.

== Gallery ==
Parinacota and Pomerape, the Nevados de Payachata

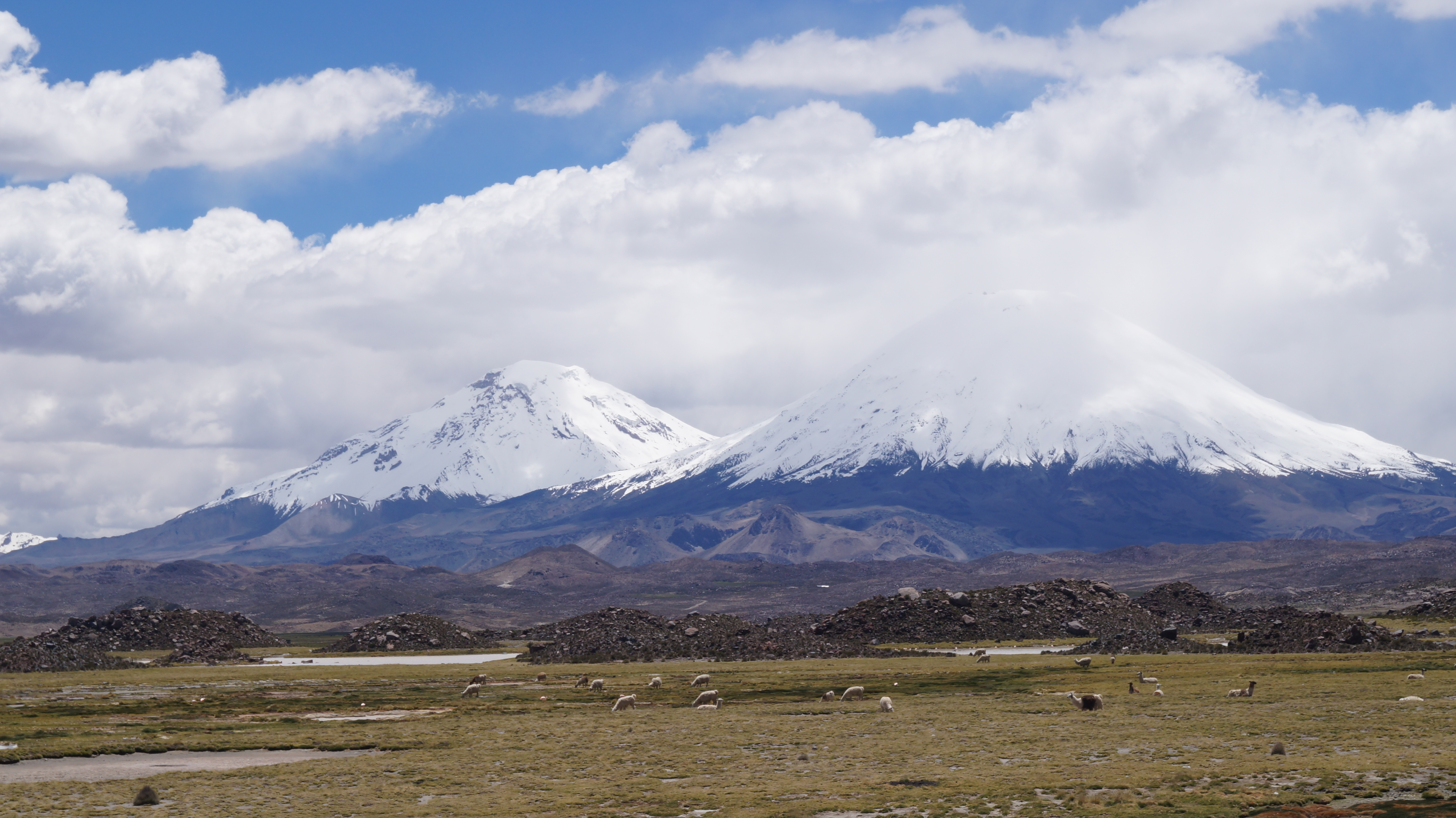
Parinacota on the right and Pomerape on the left

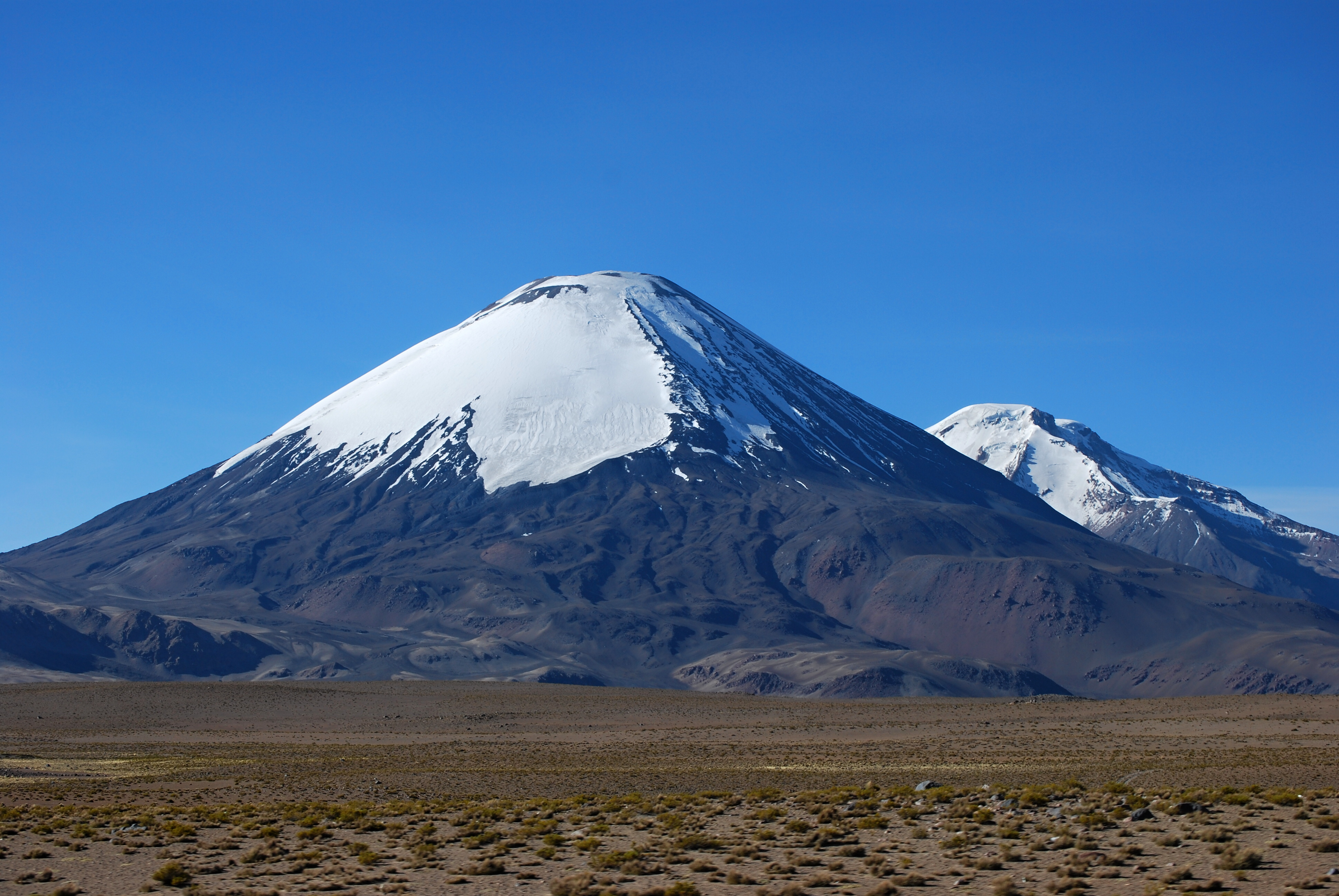
Parinacota and Pomerape

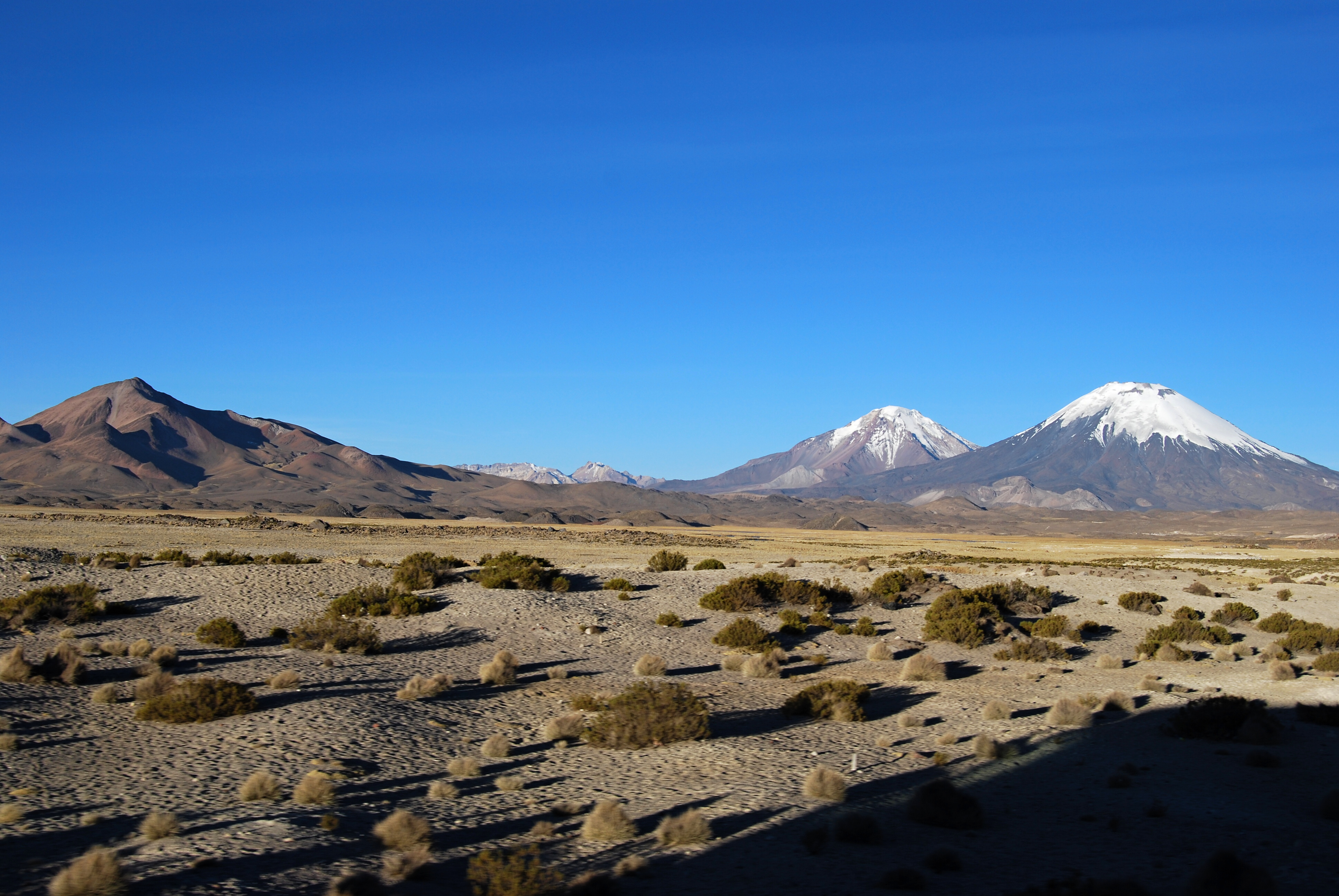
Parinacota on the right and Pomerape just right of the centre

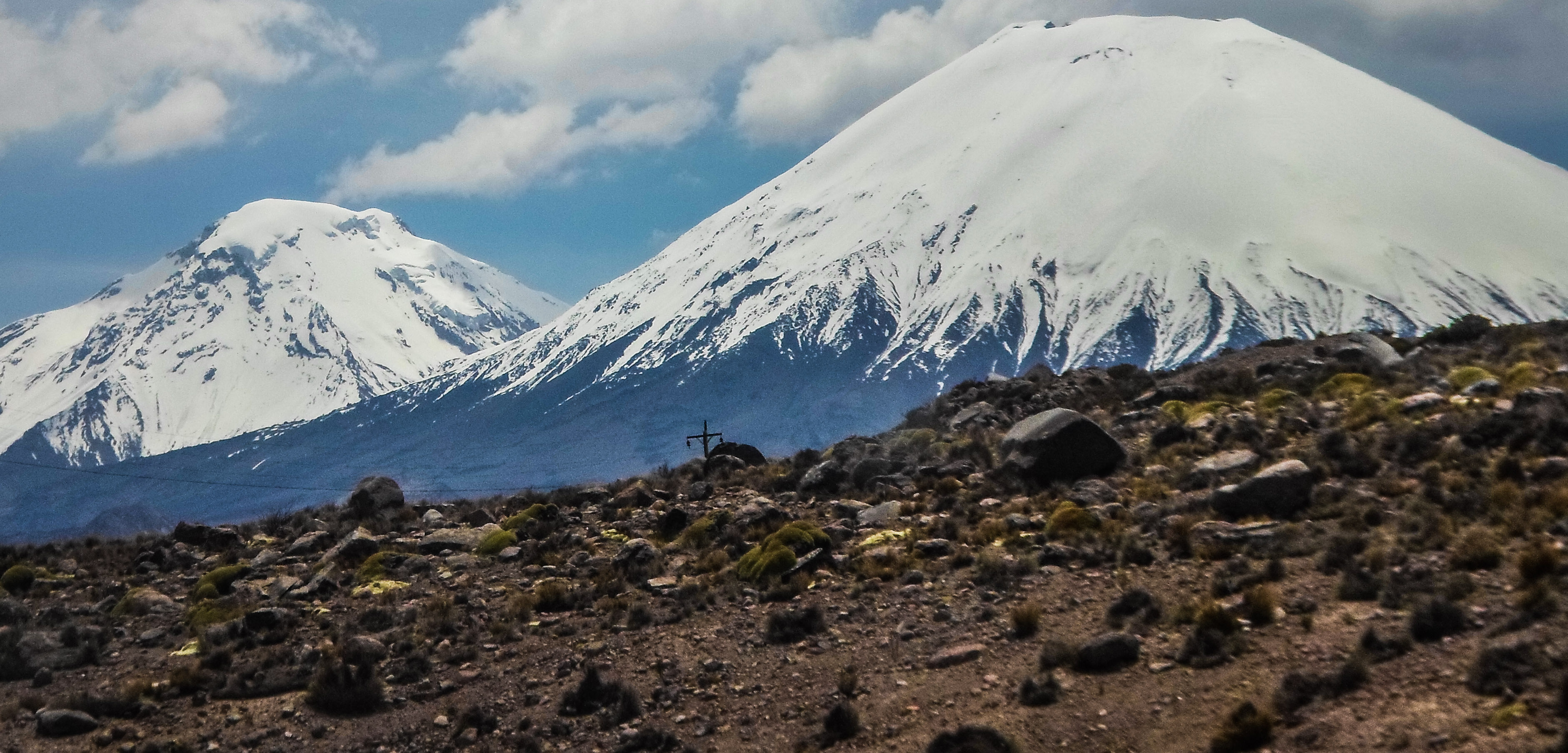
Parinacota, on the left Pomerape

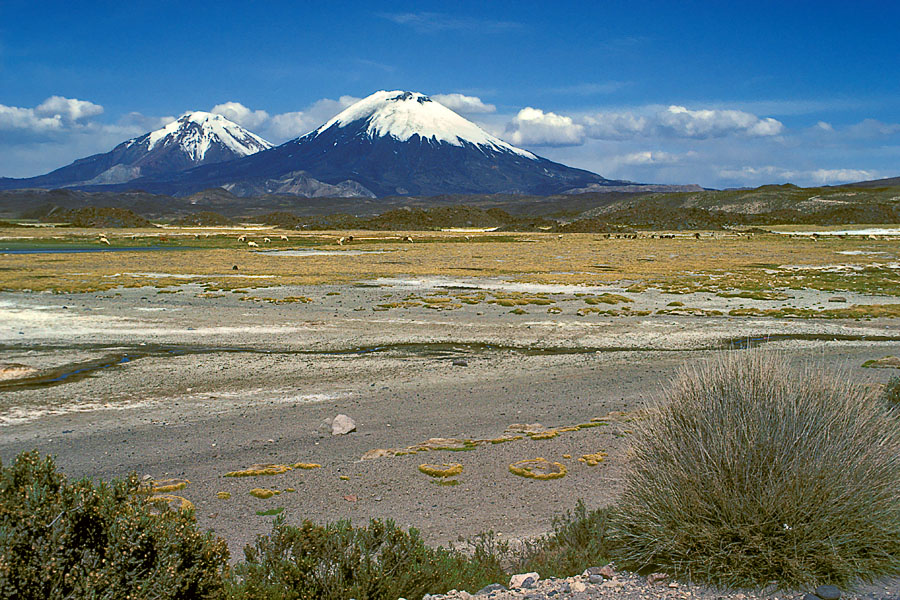
Parinacota, on the left Pomerape

== See also ==
- List of volcanoes in Bolivia
- List of volcanoes in Chile
