= Caldera Lauca =

Chilean caldera

The Caldera Lauca is a caldera in the Arica y Parinacota Region of Chile. It is located in the Cordillera Occidental, in the valley of the Lauca River. The elliptic caldera has an east-west extension of 23 kilometres (14 mi) and 50 kilometres (31 mi) in north-south direction, buried beneath the late Miocene Vilañuñumani-Tejene volcanic complex in the north and ending at Chucal in the south. The 21 mya Oxaya Ignimbrite originates in the caldera. The eastern border of the caldera is buried beneath younger ignimbrites and deposits but is located east of the Guallatiri volcano. An Oligocene fault marks the western edge of the caldera.

The caldera is filled up to 700 metres (2,300 ft) thick with 630 cubic kilometres (150 cu mi) of ignimbrite. Rocks have varying SiO_{2} content from 58 to 73%. One sample of Lauca ignimbrite is younger than the Lauca caldera.

It forms one of the older volcanic centres in the Payachata region, together with the Ajoya-Choquelimpie volcanic complex and the Caquena domes, while Pomerape and Parinacota are more recent volcanic centres.

== See also ==
- Altiplano-Puna volcanic complex
- Lauca
- Guallatiri
