= Choquelimpie =

Volcano in Chile

Coordinates: 18°18′19″S 69°16′42″W

Choquelimpie is a 5,327 metres (17,477 ft) high volcano in Chile. It is constructed from several separate layers of andesite and dacite on top of Tertiary and Precambrian layers. The volcano was active over six million years ago, with the neighbouring volcano Ajoya active over seven million years ago. Since then, erosion and glacial activity have dramatically reduced the height of the volcano and excavated a central depression.

Choquelimpie is part of one of two belts of volcanically-generated ore deposits. It is mined for silver and gold since Spanish times and a prospect in the 1980s indicated the presence of over eleven tons of ore.

== Geography and vegetation ==
Choquelimpie is located in Parinacota province, Arica y Parinacota Region, Chile. The border with Bolivia is 20 kilometres (12 mi) east.

The basement rock surrounding Choquelimpie is mostly of Tertiary age or younger, with the exception of a narrow segment of Precambrian schists. Some of the Tertiary rocks are sediments which accumulated in basins and are of volcanic or biogenic origin. Volcanism in the area started with ignimbrites and now-eroded stratovolcanoes which have been dated at 10 ± 0.6 mya and the 19 mya Condoriri ignimbrite. Local fault zones and lineaments also contribute to the geomorphology.

Plant species found at Choquelimpie include Poa grasses, ragworts and Xenophyllum.

== Geology ==
The former Choquelimpie volcano which partially overlaps with the Ajoya volcano to the northeast was about 5,600–6,000 metres (18,400–19,700 ft) high and surface area of 4.5 by 3.8 kilometres (2.8 mi × 2.4 mi). Later erosion removed most of the central portion of the volcano, lowering it to 4,550 metres (14,930 ft) and leaving a rim behind with altitudes of about 5,300 metres (17,400 ft). The rim was later breached by Milluni creek. Some hills within the central depression include Cerro Choquelimpie which is the main mining place. Mass failure may have also helped at exposing the buried parts of the volcano.

In order of age, five units have been distinguished. The oldest is a dacitic breccia up to 200 metres (660 ft) thick which forms Cerro Antena in the midwestern segment of the volcano. Two subsequent andesite and dacite layers form the bulk of the volcano's flanks. They include both breccia and lava flows and the andesite layer is up to 150 metres (490 ft) thick. Biotite, hornblende, plagioclase and quartz form most of the phenocrysts in these layers. Five different dacitic lava domes and lava dome like structures are found in the central sector of the volcano including Cerro Chivaque and form the penultimate layer. Finally, andesitic dykes and one dacitic pipe were intruded. Two major regional lineaments have influenced Choquelimpie volcanism. One caldera may be associated with Choquelimpie. Dates obtained from Choquelimpie are over 6.60 ± 0.2 mya old. Choquelimpie's rocks are overall calc-alkaline shoshonite in terms of composition.

Choquelimpie was glaciated during the Pleistocene glaciations, with lateral moraines and cirques well preserved. Three moraine stages have been distinguished, the middle stage of which was attributed to the Last Glacial Maximum although an older age is plausible. In the Late Glacial, about 12 glaciers descended from Choquelimpie, with end moraines at altitudes of 4,450–4,650 metres (14,600–15,260 ft). Some moraines were overrun by the Parinacota debris avalanche.

Volcanoes surrounding Choquelimpie include Caldera Lauca (10.5 ± 0.3 mya), Ajoya (7.06 ± 0.21 mya), Taapaca, Guallatiri and Parinacota. With decreasing age they are progressively less eroded and less affected by glacial action; Guallatiri is solfatarically active to the present day.

== Mining ==
A mine is located within the Choquelimpie volcano. Mining has been reported as early as 1643. Before 1980 roughly 1.5 tonnes (1.5 long tons; 1.7 short tons) gold and 200 tonnes (200 long tons; 220 short tons) silver were obtained. Estimates made in 1986-1987 indicate the existence of more than 11 million tons of ore. Ore grades estimated are 3 grams per tonne (0.11 oz/long ton) gold and 150–300 grams per tonne (5.4–10.8 oz/long ton) silver. Mineralization which formed the Choquelimpie mineral deposits occurred through pulses of hydrothermal processes in acid sulfate environments and subsequent supergene processes. Such processes may now be underway at Guallatiri.

The Choquelimpie mineral deposit belongs to a category of ore deposits in the Andes which forms a long belt of epithermal deposits. Another belt of copper porphyry deposits is also found in the Andes but independent of the epithermal belt. Orcopampa in Peru is another mineral deposit of this epithermal type. The mineral deposits are found within heavily altered breccias and porphyries in the case of Cerro Choquelimpie, with kaolinization and silification predominant. Propylitic modification is also present. The mineralization occurred 300 metres (980 ft) beneath the local water table.

Attempts to extract silver from sulfidic waste commenced in 1960 but success only occurred after 1980. The processing first occurred in Arica and later in a plant next to the mine. Acanthite, auripigment, galena, realgar and sphalerite are among the ores found at Choquelimpie. The surrounding rock contains alunite, barite, calcite, clays, pyrite and quartz. Enargite is also found at Choquelimpie. The mineral manganese-tennantite (Cu6(Cu_{4}Mn_{2})As_{4}S_{13}) was first discovered there.

The company Norsemont Mining owns the Choquelimpie mine. Previous companies involved in Choquelimpie included the Arica Mining Company. Shell Chile bought Choquelimpie in 1987. The discovery of gold at Choquelimpie in the 1980s, among other deposits, has contributed towards making Chile a major gold province. Migrant workers at Choquelimpie and other mines of the region brought their culture into Chile.

== Sources ==
- Groepper, H.; Calvo, M.; Crespo, H.; Bisso, C. R.; Cuadra, W. A; Dunkerley, P. M.; Aguirre, E. (1 October 1991). "The epithermal gold-silver deposit of Choquelimpie, northern Chile". Economic Geology. 86 (6): 1206–1221. Bibcode:1991EcGeo..86.1206G. doi:10.2113/gsecongeo.86.6.1206.
