= Lauca (volcano) =

Stratovolcano in Putre, Chile

- Location within Chile

Highest point
- Elevation: 5,140 m (16,860 ft)
- Coordinates: 18°20′S 69°23′W

Naming
- English translation: Aquatic grass
- Language of name: Aymara

Geography
- Location: Putre, Arica y Parinacota Region; Chile
- Parent range: Altiplano, Andes

Geology
- Rock age: Miocene-Pliocene
- Mountain type: Stratovolcano
- Volcanic belt: Central Volcanic Zone
- Last eruption: Pliocene

Lauca is a 5,140 metres (16,860 ft) high andesitic stratovolcano in the Central Volcanic Zone of the Andes on the Altiplano in northern Chile. Administratively it is located in Putre, Arica y Parinacota Region. The volcano was active during the Late Miocene from 10.5 million years ago onwards. A major ignimbrite collapsed the volcano in the Late Pliocene.

== Geology ==
Andesites from the Lauca volcano, active in the Late Miocene as of 10.5 million years ago, exist in two groups, plagioclase rich ones which underwent alteration and fine grained silicic ones that are fresher. The territory is underpinned with a crust formed from rocks of Precambrian to Cretaceous age, with thicknesses up to 70 kilometres (43 mi). Amphibole rich lava flows formed a uniform volcanic cone. A later major ignimbrite eruption caused the collapse of the centre and formed the Lauca ignimbrite. A caldera is present, with a lava dome at the northeastern rim.

The Lauca ignimbrite has a thickness up to 150 metres (490 ft), covering the El Diablo Formation in parts and filling the Lluta Canyon. Ar-Ar ages for this rhyolitic ignimbrite have been determined at 2.73 ± 0.02 Ma based on sanidine analysis and 2.87 ± 0.05 Ma from biotite. The Lauca ignimbrite has been correlated to the Pérez ignimbrite in Bolivia and the Pachía ignimbrite in southern Peru. Along the Copaquilla-Tignámar Fault, uplifting the eastern side over the western side, the Lauca ignimbrite has been displaced over 100 to 150 metres (330 to 490 ft), indicative of tectonic activity after deposition in the Late Pliocene. In parts, the Lauca ignimbrite is covered by conglomeratic terrace deposits.

== See also ==
- Caldera Lauca
- Lauca National Park
- Lauca River
- Lake Tauca
