= Caquena =

Coordinates: 18°03′S 69°12′W

- Village
- Interactive map of Caquena
- Country: Chile
- Region: Arica and Parinacota Region

Caquena is a village in the Arica and Parinacota Region, Chile.

== Climate ==
According to the Köppen climate classification, Caquena has a cold tundra climate (ET) with wet summers and dry winters. The diurnal range is high year-round.

Climate data for Caquena
Month	Jan	Feb	Mar	Apr	May	Jun	Jul	Aug	Sep	Oct	Nov	Dec	Year
Mean daily maximum °C (°F)	12.4 (54.3)	11.6 (52.9)	12.9 (55.2)	12.7 (54.9)	11.2 (52.2)	10.6 (51.1)	10.4 (50.7)	11.6 (52.9)	12.5 (54.5)	14.0 (57.2)	14.7 (58.5)	13.8 (56.8)	12.4 (54.3)
Daily mean °C (°F)	4.6 (40.3)	4.2 (39.6)	4.8 (40.6)	4.1 (39.4)	1.4 (34.5)	−0.1 (31.8)	−0.6 (30.9)	0.6 (33.1)	1.9 (35.4)	3.0 (37.4)	4.0 (39.2)	4.2 (39.6)	2.7 (36.8)
Mean daily minimum °C (°F)	−3.2 (26.2)	−3.1 (26.4)	−3.2 (26.2)	−4.5 (23.9)	−8.4 (16.9)	−10.9 (12.4)	−11.6 (11.1)	−10.4 (13.3)	−8.7 (16.3)	−8.0 (17.6)	−6.7 (19.9)	−5.3 (22.5)	−7.0 (19.4)
Average precipitation mm (inches)	123 (4.8)	108 (4.3)	75 (3.0)	13 (0.5)	1 (0.0)	3 (0.1)	8 (0.3)	8 (0.3)	1 (0.0)	5 (0.2)	10 (0.4)	59 (2.3)	414 (16.2)
Source: Atlas Agroclimatico de Chile
