= List of Liberty ships (C) =

This is a list of Liberty ships with names beginning with C.

== Description ==
The standard Liberty ship (EC-2-S-C1 type) was a cargo ship 441 feet 6 inches (134.57 m) long overall, with a beam of 56 feet 10 3/4 inches (17.34 m). It had a depth of 37 feet 4 inches (11.38 m) and a draft of 26 feet 10 inches (8.18 m). It was powered by a triple expansion steam engine, which had cylinders of 24 1/2 inches (62 cm), 37 inches (94 cm) and 70 inches (180 cm) diameter by 48 inches (120 cm) stroke. The engine produced 2,500ihp at 76rpm. Driving a four-blade propeller 18 feet 6 inches (5.64 m) in diameter, could propel the ship at 11 knots (20 km/h).

Cargo was carried in five holds, numbered 1–5 from bow to stern. Grain capacity was 84,183 cubic feet (2,383.8 m^{3}), 145,604 cubic feet (4,123.0 m^{3}), 96,429 cubic feet (2,730.6 m^{3}), 93,190 cubic feet (2,639 m^{3}) and 93,190 cubic feet (2,639 m^{3}), with a further 49,086 cubic feet (1,390.0 m^{3}) in the deep tanks. Bale capacity was 75,405 cubic feet (2,135.2 m^{3}), 134,638 cubic feet (3,812.5 m^{3}), 83,697 cubic feet (2,370.0 m^{3}), 82,263 cubic feet (2,329.4 m^{3}) and 82,435 cubic feet (2,334.3 m^{3}), with a further 41,135 cubic feet (1,164.8 m^{3}) in the deep tanks.

It carried a crew of 45, plus 36 United States Navy Armed Guard gunners. Later in the war, this was altered to a crew of 52, plus 29 gunners. Accommodation was in a three deck superstructure placed midships. The galley was equipped with a range, a 25 US gallons (95 L) stock kettle and other appliances. Messrooms were equipped with an electric hot plate and an electric toaster.

== Caesar Rodney ==
Caesar Rodney was built by Bethlehem Fairfield Shipyard, Baltimore, Maryland. Her keel was laid on 9 August 1942. She was launched on 21 September and delivered on 30 September. She was scrapped at Portland, Maine in November 1959.

== Caleb C. Wheeler ==
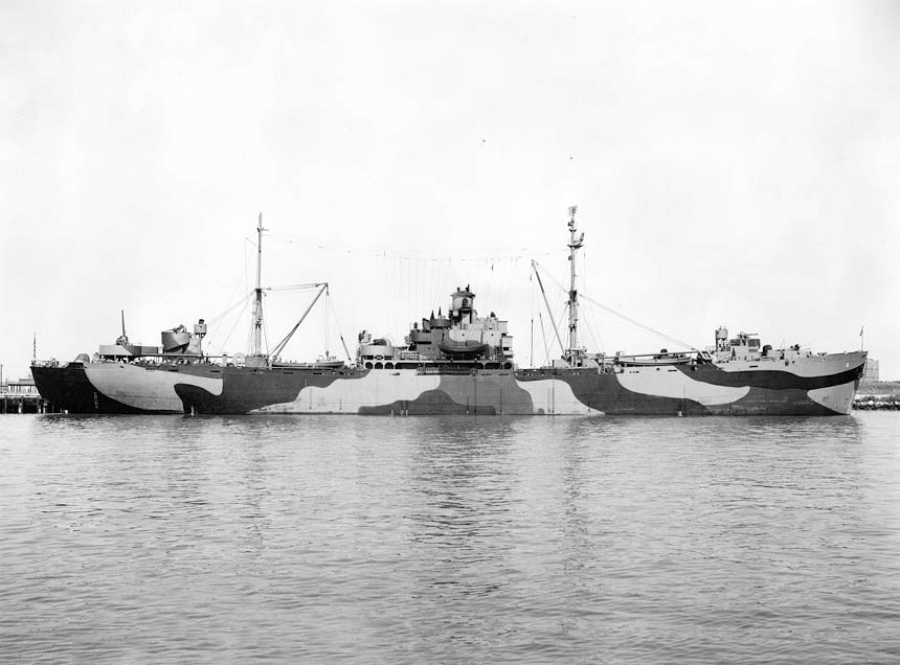
USS Oahu

Caleb C. Wheeler was built by Bethlehem Fairfield Shipyard. Her keel was laid on 14 August 1943. She was launched as Caleb C. Wheeler on 9 September and delivered to the United States Navy as Oahu on 15 September. A repair ship, she was laid up in reserve at San Diego, California in January 1947. Transferred to Suisun Bay in July 1963. Scrapped at Tacoma, Washington in June 1979.

== Caleb Strong ==
Caleb Strong was built by California Shipbuilding Corporation, Terminal Island, Los Angeles, California. Her keel was laid on 28 January 1942. She was launched on 16 April and delivered on 27 May. She was scrapped at Panama City, Florida in February 1966.

== Calvin Austin ==
Calvin Austin was built by New England Shipbuilding Corporation, South Portland, Maine. Her keel was laid on 23 October 1944. She was launched on 4 December and delivered on 14 December. She was scrapped at Panama City, Florida in September 1969.

== Calvin Coolidge ==
Calvin Coolidge was built by New England Shipbuilding Corporation. Her keel was laid on 19 October 1942. She was launched on 2 January 1943 and delivered on 4 February. She was scrapped at Wilmington, Delaware in January 1965.

== Cardinal Gibbons ==
Cardinal Gibbons was built by Bethlehem Fairfield Shipyard. Her keel was laid on 8 September 1942. She was launched on 10 October and delivered on 23 October. Built for the War Shipping Administration (WSA), she was operated under the management of Sword Line Inc. Laid up at Mobile, Alabama post-war, she was scrapped at Panama City, Florida in December 1970.

== Cardinal O'Connell ==
Cardinal O'Connell was built by New England Shipbuilding Corporation. Her keel was laid on 11 June 1945. She was launched on 31 August and delivered on 28 September. A boxed aircraft transport ship, she served with the United States Army Transportation Corps. Transferred to the Military Sea Transportation Service in December 1949. Returned to the United States Government in March 1945. Laid up in Puget Sound. Scuttled 93 nautical miles (172 km) off Cape Flattery, Washington in October 1969.

== Carl B. Eielson ==
Carl B. Eielson was built by Permanente Metals Corporation, Richmond, California. Her keel was laid on 4 January 1944. She was launched on 22 January and delivered on 29 January. She was scrapped at Portland, Oregon in March 1962.

== Carl E. Ladd ==
Carl E. Ladd was a tanker built by J. A. Jones Construction Co., Panama City, Florida. Her keel was laid on 19 June 1944. She was launched on 26 July and delivered on 11 August. Scrapped at Portland, Oregon in December 1967.

== Carleton Ellis ==
Carleton Ellis was a tanker built by California Shipbuilding Corporation. She was completed in October 1943. Built for the WSA, she was operated under the management of Barber Asphalt Corp. Sold in 1947 to Cuba Distilling Co., New York and renamed Catahoula. Converted in 1949 to carry vegetable oil and molasses. Sold in 1951 to National Navigation Corp., New York. Sold in 1952 to National Distillers Products Corp., New York. Sold in 1954 to San Rafael Compania Navigation, Panama and renamed Messaria. Operated under the management of Orion Shipping & Trading Co. Converted to a cargo ship at Schiedam, Netherlands. Converted at Kure, Japan to an ore carrier in 1955. Now 511 feet 6 inches (155.91 m) long and assessed at 8,466 GRT. Renamed Andros Merchant in 1957 and reflagged to Liberia. Sold in 1960 to Industries Marine Corp. Reflagged to Greece but remaining under the same managers. Management transferred to Capeside Steamship Co. in 1963. Scrapped at Sakaide, Japan in April 1967.

== Carl G. Barth ==
Carl G. Barth was built by Permanente Metals Corporation. Her keel was laid on 21 January 1944. She was launched on 9 February and delivered on 17 February. Built for the WSA, she was operated under the management of Olympic Steamship Company. To the French Government in 1947 and renamed Falaise. Operated under the management of Compagnie Générale Transatlantique. Management transferred to Compagnie des Messageries Maritimes in 1949, then Compagnie de Navigation Fraissinet et Cyprien Fabre in 1961. Scrapped at Ferrol, Spain in January 1964.

== Carl Oftedal ==
Carl Oftedal was built by New England Shipbuilding Corporation. Her keel was laid on 18 January 1945. Launched as George N. Drake on 13 March, she was delivered as Carl Oftedal on 28 March. Built for the Norwegian Government, she was sold in 1946 to Det Bergenske D/S, Bergen, Norway. Renamed Brant County in 1947. She collided with the American tanker Southern Cross in Delaware Bay on 28 March 1950. Both ships were damaged. Sold in 1954 to Halvorsen Shipping Co., Bergen and renamed Matang. Sold in 1956 to Hedwigshutte Kohlen & Kokswerke, Hamburg, West Germany and renamed Hedwigshutte. Sold in 1960 to Morania Compania Navigation and renamed Saronis. Reflagged to Greece and operated under the management of A. Luisi Ltd. Management transferred to J. C. Carras & Sons in 1965. Scrapped at Kaohsiung, Taiwan in January 1968.

== Carlos Carrillo ==
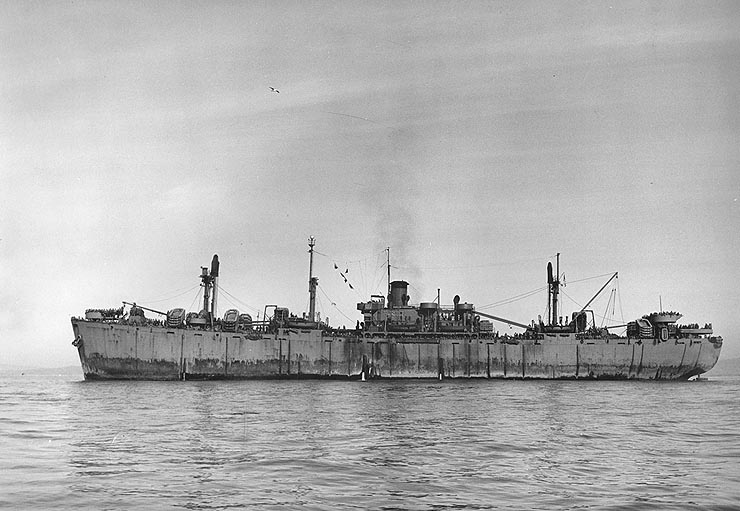
Carlos Carrillo

Carlos Carrillo was built by California Shipbuilding Corporation. Her keel was laid on 19 December 1942. She was launched on 15 January 1943 and delivered on 31 January. She was scrapped at Portland, Oregon in February 1963.

== Carlos J. Finlay ==
Carlos J. Finlay was built by Todd Houston Shipbuilding Corporation, Houston, Texas. Her keel was laid on 16 June 1944. She was launched on 25 July and delivered on 7 August. Laid up at Beaumont, Texas post-war, she was scrapped at Brownsville, Texas in September 1970.

== Carl R. Gray ==
Carl R. Gray was a tanker built by California Shipbuilding Corporation. She was completed in December 1943. To United States Navy as Gemsbok. Returned to WSA in May 1946 and renamed Carl R. Gray. Sold in 1948 to Maris Tramp System Inc. and renamed Alpha. Operated under the management of T. J Stevenson & Co. Sold in 1951 to Strathmore Shipping Co., New York and renamed Strathbay. Converted to a cargo ship at Savannah, Georgia in 1953. Sold in 1955 to Standard Steamship Corp. and renamed Columbia Trader. Operated under the management of West Coast Steamship Co., Portland, Oregon. Sold to her managers in 1959. Sold in 1963 to Saxis Steamship Co. and renamed Pilot Rock. Operated under the management of Columbia Steamship Co. Returned to United States Government in 1965. Scrapped at Portland, Oregon in March 1966.

== Carl Schurz ==
Carl Schurz was built by Oregon Shipbuilding Corporation, Portland, Oregon. Her keel was laid on 4 November 1942. She was launched on 30 November and delivered on 9 December. She was scrapped at Tacoma in October 1961.

== Carl Thusgaard ==
Carl Thusgaard was built by Bethlehem Fairfield Shipyard. Her keel was laid on 24 November 1943. She was launched as Carl Thusgaard on 17 December and delivered as Samkey on 24 December. To MoWT under Lend-Lease, she was operated under the management of New Zealand Shipping Company. Last reported on 31 January 1948 at 41°48′N 24°00′W, whilst on a voyage from London to Santiago de Cuba, Cuba. Presumed that her ballast shifted and she foundered. A board of inquiry heard that she was not fitted with shifting boards.

== Carl Zachary Webb ==
Carl Zachary Webb was built by Delta Shipbuilding Company, New Orleans, Louisiana. Her keel was laid on 20 November 1944. She was launched on 29 December and delivered on 20 January 1945. She was scrapped at Panama City, Florida in 1963.

== Carole Lombard ==
Carole Lombard was built by California Shipbuilding Corporation. Her keel was laid on 19 December 1943. She was launched on 15 January 1944 and delivered on 31 January. She was scrapped at Hirao, Japan in August 1959.

== Carter Braxton ==
Carter Braxton was built by Bethlehem Fairfield Shipyard. Her keel was laid on 3 September 1941. She was launched on 24 January 1942 and delivered on 18 March. Built for the WSA, she was operated under the management of Union Sulphur Company, New York. Sold to her managers in 1947 and renamed Herman Frasch. Sold in 1955 to Terminal Steamship Co. and renamed Cilco Ranger. Operated under the management of A. L. Burbank & Co. Sold in 1956 to North Atlantic Marine Co., New York and renamed Murray Hill. Sold later that year to Fairfield Steamship Corp. Sold in 1957 to Universal Tramp Shipping Co., Panama and renamed Sea Spray. Reflagged to Liberia and operated under the management of Seatraders Inc. Renamed Meltemi in 1968 and reflagged to Greece. Scrapped at Kaohsiung in June 1968.

== Casimir Pulaski ==
Casimir Pulaski was built by Southeastern Shipbuilding Corporation. Her keel was laid on 13 April 1943. She was launched on 25 June and delivered on 16 July. Laid up in the James River post-war, she was sold to shipbreakers in Cleveland, Ohio in October 1972.

== Casper S. Yost ==
Casper S. Yost was built by Permanente Metals Corporation. Her keel was laid on 23 September 1943. She was launched on 15 October and delivered on 24 October. Built for the WSA, she was operated under the management of American South African Line. Sold in 1948 to Union Sulphur Company and renamed Sulphur Mines. Sold in 1955 to Arthur Steamship Corp., New York and renamed Westport. Sold in 1956 to New England Industries Inc. Operated under the management of Overseas Navigation Corp. Sold in 1957 to Transportation Utilities Inc. Operated under the management of Phs. Van Ommeren Shipping. Management transferred to World Tramping Agencies in 1958. Sold in 1961 to Ferore Co. Inc. and renamed Ferore. Reflagged to Liberia and operated under the management of Burlingham Hupper Kennedy. Sold in 1963 to Far Eastern Marine Transport Co., Seoul, South Korea and renamed Sorabol. Sold in 1972 to Dong Chang Enterprise, South Korea. Scrapped at Masan, South Korea in May 1972.

== Cass Gilbert ==
Cass Gilbert was built by Oregon Shipbuilding Corporation. Her keel was laid on 27 March 1943. she was launched on 16 April and delivered on 24 April To the Soviet Union under Lend-Lease and renamed Stepan Razin. Scrapped at Vladivostok, Soviet Union in August 1969.

== Cassius Hudson ==
Cassius Hudson was built by J. A. Jones Construction Co., Brunswick, Georgia. Her keel was laid on 22 July 1944. She was launched on 31 August and delivered on 14 September. Built for the WSA, she was operated under the management of Alcoa Steamship Company. Struck a mine in the Gulf of Trieste (45°32′N 13°12′E on 16 October 1946 whilst on a voyage from the Hampton Roads, Virginia to Venice, Italy. She was taken in tow, but struck another mine and sank.

== Cebu ==
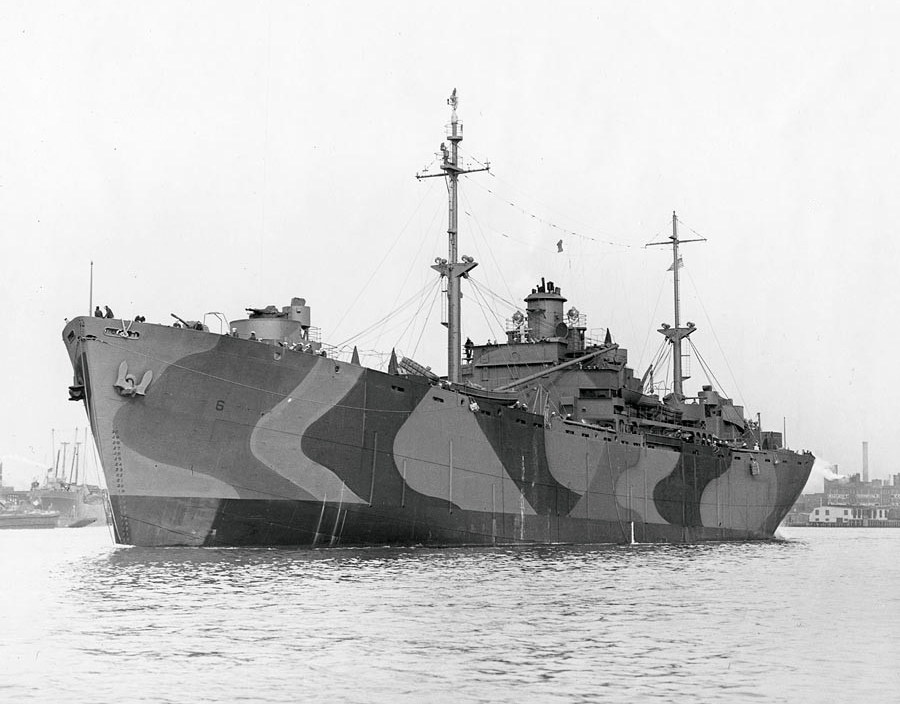
USS Cebu

Cebu was built by Bethlehem Fairfield Shipyards. Her keel was laid on 21 September 1943. She was launched as Francis P. Duffey on 18 October and delivered to the United States Navy as Cebu on 27 October. A repair ship, she was laid up in Suisun Bay in June 1947. She was scrapped at Portland, Oregon in October 1973.

== Cecil G. Sellers ==
Cecil G. Sellers was built by Permanente Metals Corporation. Her keel was laid on 22 April 1944. She was launched on 11 May and delivered on 19 May. She caught fire 200 nautical miles (370 km) south west of the Cocos Islands on 29 February 1948 whilst on a voyage from Fremantle, Australia to Cobh, Ireland. She was abandoned. The fire was extinguished and she was towed in to Fremantle on 19 March. Declared a constructive total loss, she was towed to Hong Kong in February 1949. Scrapped at Shanghai, China in November 1950.

== Cecil N. Bean ==
Cecil N. Bean was built by Delta Shipbuilding Company. Her keel was laid on 29 January 1944. She was launched on 6 March and delivered on 10 April. Built for the WSA, she was operated under the management of American Liberty Steamship Co. Management transferred to Fall River Steamship Co. in 1946. Sold in 1949 to Drytrans Inc., New York. Sold in 1957 to Bulkcargo Shipping Corp. and renamed Penn Voyager. Reflagged to Liberia and placed under the management of Pacific Steamship Agency. Sold in 1959 to Penntrans Co. Reflagged to the United States, remaining under the same management. Sold in 1961 to Delos Maritime Co. and renamed Delos Pioneer. Reflagged to Liberia and placed under the management of Pacific Steamship Agency. Sold in 1965 to Aris Steamship Co. and renamed Rena. Operated under the management of Astoria Steamship Agency. Scrapped at Utsumi, Japan in May 1967.

== C. Francis Jenkins ==
C. Francis Jenkins was built by J. A. Jones Construction Co., Brunswick. Her keel was laid on 20 July 1944. She was launched on 26 August and delivered on 9 September. Built for the WSA, she was operated under the management of Agwilines Inc. Management transferred to A. L. Burbank & Co. in 1946. Sold in 1947 to Compania de Navigatio Cristobal, Panama and renamed Ionian Leader. Operated under the management of Vergottis Ltd. Scrapped at Kaohsiung in November 1966.

== Champ Clark ==
Champ Clark was built by Todd Houston Shipbuilding Corporation. Her keel was laid on 2 November 1942. She was launched on 30 December and delivered on 14 January 1943. She was scrapped at Terminal Island in 1958.

== Charles A. Broadwater ==
Charles A. Broadwater was built by Oregon Shipbuilding Corporation. Her keel was laid on 10 August 1943. She was launched as Charles A. Broadwater on 29 August and delivered as Samthar on 9 September. To MoWT under Lend-Lease. Operated under the management of Royal Mail Lines. Sold to her managers in 1947 and renamed Barranca. Sold in 1956 to Corrado Società di Navigazione, Genoa and renamed Cesco Corrado. Scrapped at La Spezia in July 1967.

== Charles A. Dana ==
Charles A. Dana was built by North Carolina Shipbuilding Company, Wilmington, North Carolina. Her keel was laid on 15 June 1943. She was launched on 15 July and delivered on 22 July. Laid up at Beaumont post-war, She was scuttled off Aransas Pass, Texas in March 1976.

== Charles A. Draper ==
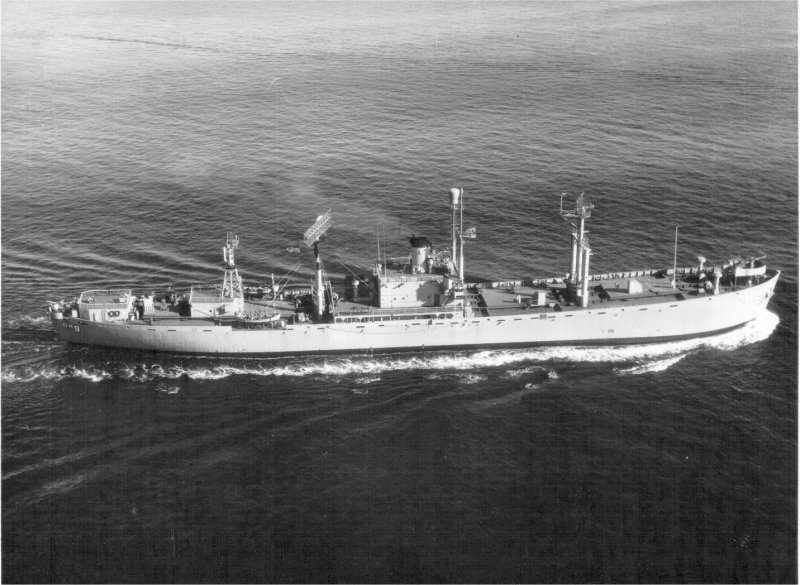
USS Investigator

Charles A. Draper was built by J. A. Jones Construction Company, Panama City. Her keel was laid on 28 November 1944. She was launched on 9 January 1945 and delivered on 24 January. A boxed aircraft transport ship, she was laid up in October 1945. Returned to service in February 1947 fo a few months, then laid up again. To United States Navy in July 1956. Converted at Charleston Naval Shipyard and entered service as USS Investigator. Placed in reserve in April 1965. Sold to shipbreakers in Karachi, Pakistan in December 1970. Resold to German breakers, resold again. Arrived at Santander, Spain for scrapping in May 1971.

== Charles A. Keffer ==
Charles A. Keffer was built by Southeastern Shipbuilding Corporation. Her keel was laid on 1 June 1944. She was launched on 15 June and delivered on 5 August. Laid up in the James River post-war, she was scrapped at Gandia, Spain in November 1972.

== Charles A. McAllister ==
Charles A. McAllister was built by Bethlehem Fairfield Shipyard. Her keel was laid on 14 April 1943. She was launched on 12 May and delivered on 21 May. She was scrapped at Baltimore in 1960.

== Charles A. McCue ==
Charles A. McCue was built by Bethlehem Fairfield Shipyard. Her keel was laid on 22 August 1944. She was launched on 22 September and delivered on 11 October. Built for the WSA, she was operated under the management of Pope & Talbot Inc. Sold in 1947 to General Freighting & Brokerage Corp., Dover, Delaware and renamed Joseph Feuer. Sold in 1951 to Pan-American Steamship Corp. and renamed Orion. Operated under the management of Orion Shipping & Trading Co. She came ashore at Madh Fort, on Madh Island, 15 nautical miles (28 km) north of Bombay, India on 25 July 1951 whilst on a voyage from "Navalakhi" to Bombay. She was refloated on 18 August. Although declared a constructive total loss, she was repaired. Sold in 1952 to Donosa Compania Navigation, Panama and renamed Ocean Leader, remaining under the same managers. Renamed Nicolaos in 1954. Sold in 1960 to Assimio Compania de Vapores, Panama. Renamed Nicolaos P. and reflagged to Greece. Driven ashore at Necochea, Argentina on 9 March 1965 whilst on a voyage from San Nicolas to Necochea. Declared a constructive total loss, she was sold for scrapping.

== Charles A. Warfield ==
Charles A. Warfield was built by California Shipbuilding Corporation. Her keel was laid on 31 May 1943. She was launched on 25 June and delivered on 9 July. She was scrapped at Mobile in April 1969.

== Charles A. Wickliffe ==
Charles A. Wickliffe was built by Delta Shipbuilding Company. Her keel was laid on 15 September 1943. She was launched on 30 October and delivered on 13 December. A tanker, she was built for the WSA and operated under the management of Keystone Shipping Corp. Laid up in the James River in 1946, she was sold in 1951 to Wickliffe Tankers Corp., New York. Sold in 1954 to Wickliffe Tanker SA, Panama and reflagged to Liberia. Sold in 1955 to Omnium Steamship Co. and renamed Omnium Carrier. Operated under the management of Omnium Freighting Corp. Converted to a cargo ship at Yokohama, Japan in 1957. Lengthened to 511 feet 6 inches (155.91 m) and now assessed at 8,196 GRT. Sold in 1968 to Suffolk Shipping Corp. and renamed Lavenham. Operated under the management of Eastern & European Shipping Co. Scrapped at Kaohsiung in June 1971.

== Charles A. Young ==
Charles A. Young was built by New England Shipbuilding Corporation. Her keel was laid on 20 October 1943. She was launched as Charles A. Young on 3 December and delivered as Samspring on 16 December. To MoWT under Lend-Lease, she was operated under the management of Royal Mail Lines. Sold to her managers in 1947 and renamed Beresina. Sold in 1956 to West Africa Navigation Co. Ltd and renamed African Monarch. Reflagged to Liberia and operated under the management of T. J. Verrando & Co. Sold in 1959 to General Navigation Co. of Monrovia, remaining under the same management. Management transferred to Transamerican Steamship Co. in 1963. Scrapped at Split, Yugoslavia in November 1969.

== Charles Brantley Aycock ==
Charles Brantley Aycock was built by Delta Shipbuilding Company. Her keel was laid on 9 May 1942. She was launched on 7 September and delivered on 30 September. She was scrapped at Tacoma in August 1962.

== Charles Bulfinch ==
Charles Bulfinch was built by Bethlehem Fairfield Shipyard. Her keel was laid on 14 May 1943. She was launched on 10 June and delivered on 22 June. She was sold to Canadian buyers in March 1970. Resold, she was scrapped at Vado Ligure, Italy in June 1971.

== Charles Carroll ==
Charles Carroll was built by Bethlehem Fairfield Shipyard. Launched in 1941, she was delivered on 19 January 1942. Laid up in the Hudson River post-war, she was scrapped at Kearny in January 1971.

== Charles C. Glover ==
Charles C. Glover was built by Bethlehem Fairfield Shipyard. Her keel was laid on 12 August 1944. She was launched on 16 September and delivered on 30 September. She ran aground 4 nautical miles (7.4 km) from the mouth of the Loire on 24 October 1945 and was abandoned. She was refloated on 20 November and taken in tow for Saint-Nazaire, France, but struck a mine and sank. Declared a constructive total loss, she was sold for scrapping in October 1946.

== Charles C. Jones ==
Charles C. Jones was built by Southeastern Shipbuilding Corporation. Her keel was laid on 18 September 1943. She was launched on 5 November and delivered on 17 November. She was scrapped at Rosyth, United Kingdom in October 1960.

== Charles C. Long ==
Charles C. Long was built by Bethlehem Fairfield Shipyard. Her keel was laid on 29 July 1943. She was launched as Charles C. Long on 24 August and delivered as Samur on 1 September. To MoWT under Lend-Lease, she was operated under the management of Lamport & Holt Line. To United States Maritime Commission (USMC) in 1948, officially renamed Charles C. Long. Laid up at Beaumont bearing name Samur. Scrapped at New Orleans in March 1966.

== Charles C. Pinckney ==
Charles C. Pinckney was built by North Carolina Shipbuilding Company. Her keel was laid on 11 December 1941. She was launched on 10 May 1942 and delivered on 28 May. Built for the WSA, she was operated under the management of American South African Lines. Torpedoed and damaged off the Azores on 27 January 1943. The unidentified submarine surfaced and was shelled by Charles C. Pinckney, which scored four hits. It was presumed that the submarine was sunk. Abandoned by her crew, she was reboarded the next day but was again abandoned due to the approach of a submarine. Torpedoed, shelled and sunk (36°40′N 30°45′W) by U-514, which surfaced amongst survivors, who established that U-514 had not been the first attacker.

== Charles C. Randleman ==
Charles C. Randleman was built by J. A. Jones Construction Company, Brunswick. Her keel was laid on 15 January 1945. She was launched on 25 February and delivered on 13 March. She was wrecked on the Apo Reef, Philippines on 31 August 1945 whilst on a voyage from Liverpool, United Kingdom to Manila, and San Jose, Philippines.

== Charles Crocker ==
Charles Crocker was built by California Shipbuilding Corporation. Her keel was laid on 18 April 1943. She was launched on 11 May and delivered on 24 May. She was scrapped at Portland, Oregon in January 1965.

== Charles D. McIver ==
Charles D. McIver was built by North Carolina Shipbuilding Company. Her keel was laid on 1 May 1943. She was launched on 25 May and delivered on 31 May. Built for the WSA, she was operated under the management of American South African Lines. Sunk by a mine or midget submarine torpedo off Ostend, Belgium (51°23′N 3°05′E) on 23 March 1945 whilst on a voyage from Antwerp to New York.

== Charles D. Poston ==
Charles D. Poston was built by California Shipbuilding Corporation. Her keel was laid on 2 May 1943. She was launched on 25 May and delivered on 8 June. Laid up at Mobile post-war, she was scrapped at Panama City, Florida in March 1971.

== Charles D. Walcott ==
Charles D. Walcott was built by J. A. Jones Construction Company, Panama City. Her keel was laid on 29 September 1944. She was launched on 7 November and delivered on 18 November. She was scrapped at Wilmington, North Carolina in August 1961.

== Charles Dauray ==
Charles Dauray was built by New England Shipbuilding Corporation. Her keel was laid on 17 February 1944. She was launched on 5 April and delivered on 15 April. Built for the WSA, she was operated under the management of United States Navigation Co. Sold in 1947 to Southern Seas Steamship Co. and renamed Edward O. McDonnell Jr., remaining under the same management. Sold later that year to Compania Navigation Pomarosa, Panama and renamed Enterprise. Operated under the management of S. G. Embiricos. Sold in 1954 to Society Armadora Insular, Panama and renamed Silver Wake, remaining under the same management. Sold in 1956 to Compania Comercial y Financeira Sudamericana, Panama and renamed Silver Fish. Operated under the management of Compagnia Armatoriale Italiana and Venice & Runciman Ltd. Sold later that year to Compagnia Armatoriale Panarea. Reflagged to Italy and operated under the management of Runciman Ltd. Sold for scrapping at La Spezia in January 1969.

== Charles Devens ==
Charles Devens was built by Permanente Metals Corporation. Her keel was laid on 22 August 1943. She was launched as Charles Devens on 13 September and delivered as Samdel on 21 September. To MoWT under Lend-Lease. Operated under the management of Ellerman's Wilson Line. Renamed Samdel in 1943. To USMC in 1947, officially renamed Charles Devens. Laid up in the James River still named Samdel. Scrapped at Baltimore in February 1959.

== Charles E. Duryea ==
Charles E. Duryea was built by Permanente Metals Corporation. Her keel was laid on 31 March 1943. She was launched as Charles E. Duryea on 27 April and delivered as Orel on 10 May. To the Soviet Union. Renamed Ivan Polzunov in 1947. Reported scrapped in the Soviet Union in 1973; deleted from Lloyd's Register in 1977.

== Charles E. Smith ==
Charles E. Smith was built by Permanente Metals Corporation. Her keel was laid on 20 August 1943. She was launched on 11 September and delivered on 19 September. Built for the WSA, she was operated under the management of Matson Navigation Co. Sold in 1947 to Lloyd Triestino, Trieste, Italy and renamed Alga. Sold in 1965 to Grimaldi Compagnia di Navigazione, Palermo, Sicily. Sold in 1969 to Cossira SpA di Navigazione, Palermo. Scrapped at La Spezia in April 1969.

== Charles F. Amidon ==
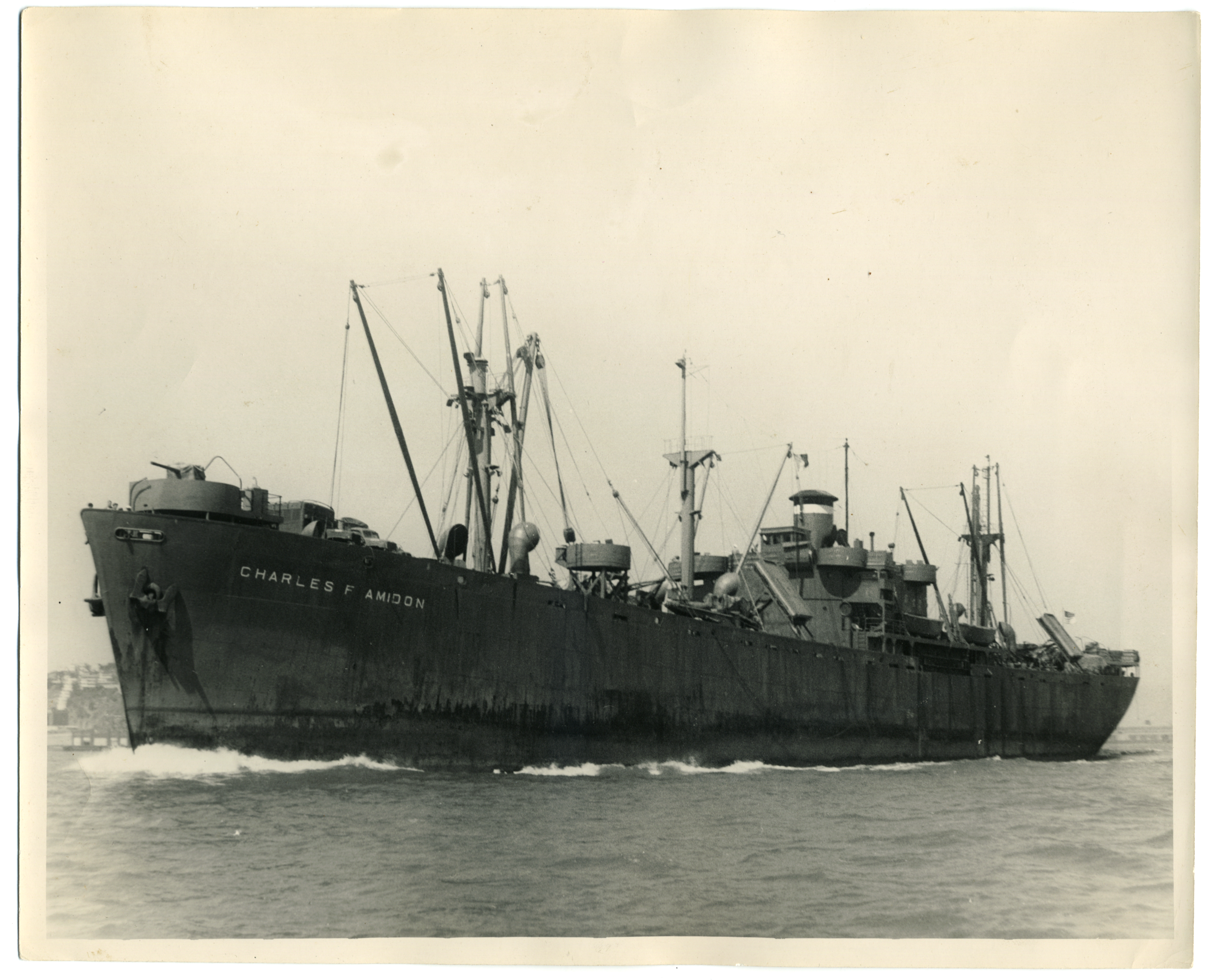
Charles F. Amidon

Charles F. Amidon was built by Oregon Shipbuilding Corporation. Her keel was launched on 24 September 1943. She was launched on 11 October and delivered on 19 October. She was scrapped at Tacoma in March 1961.

== Charles Fort ==
Charles Fort was built by California Shipbuilding Corporation. Her keel was laid on 20 November 1943. She was launched on 17 December and delivered on 31 December. Built for the WSA, she was operated under the management of Seas Shipping Co. Sold in 1947 to Compania Navigation del Caribe and renamed Emanicpator. Reflagged to Panama and operated under the management of Lemos & Pateras. Sold later that year to Compania Naviggation Transpacifica, Panama, remaining under the same managers. Management transferred to G. Lemos Bros. in 1953. Renamed Stefanios in 1961 and reflagged to Greece. Ran aground 5 nautical miles (9.3 km) north of the Camarinal Lighthouse, Spain (36°01′N 5°43′W) on 12 October 1964 whilst on a voyage from Murmugao, India to Emden, West Germany. Refloated on 21 October and taken in to Gibraltar. Declared a constructive total loss, she was scrapped at Santander in April 1965.

== Charles G. Coutant ==
Charles G. Coutant was built by Permanente Metals Corporation. Her keel was laid on 8 August 1943. She was launched on 29 August and delivered on 7 September. Built for the WSA, she was operated under the management of Polaris Steamship Co. Management transferred to Atlantic Trading Co., New York in 1946. Sold later that year to her managers and renamed Atlantic Sea. Operated under the management of Boyd, Weir & Sewell. Management transferred to Livanos & Co in 1948, then Maritime Brokers Inc. in 1952. Sold in 1953 to Atlantic Freighters Ltd., Panama. Operated under the management of S. Livanos. Sold in 1962 to Mutual Steamship Operators, Panama and renamed Splendid Sea. Operated under the management of Lugano. Sold in 1970 to European Commerce & Navigation Co., Panama and renamed Tenacidad. Scrapped at Split in May 1972.

== Charles Goodnight ==
Charles Goodnight was built by Todd Houston Shipbuilding Corporation. Her keel was laid on 19 November 1943. She was launched on 5 January 1944 and delivered on 19 January. Built for the WSA, she was operated under the management of Grace Line Inc. To the French Government in 1947. Renamed Baccarat and operated under the management of Compagnie Française de Navigation à Vapeure Chargeurs Réunis. Sold in 1954 to Southern Cross Steamship Co. and renamed Margalitis. Reflagged to Liberia and operated under the management of Eastern Steamship Agency. Sold in 1964 to Universal Mariners SA., Panama and renamed Winona. Remaining under the Liberian Flag and operated under the management of Sincere Navigation Corp., Taipei, Taiwan. Sold to her managers in 1968. Scrapped at Aioi, Japan in December 1968.

== Charles Goodyear ==
Charles Goodyear was built by Oregon Shipbuilding Corporation. Her keel was laid on 26 September 1942. She was launched on 25 October and delivered on 5 November. She was scrapped at Kearny in 1962.

== Charles Gordon Curtis ==
Charles Gordon Curtis was built by Oregon Shipbuilding Corporation. Her keel was laid on 8 October 1942. She was launched on 4 November and delivered on 15 November. Built for the WSA, she was operated under the management of Seas Shipping Co. Inc. Transferred to the Soviet Union in 1944 and renamed Sergei Kirov. Renamed S. Kirov in 1947. Scrapped at Aviles, Spain in November 1971.

== Charles H. Cugle ==
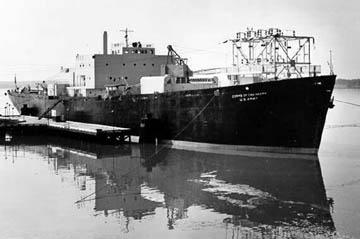
Sturgis

Charles H. Cugle was built by J. A. Jones Construction Co., Panama City. Her keel was laid on 23 June 1945. She was launched on 13 August and delivered on 31 August. Built as a boxed aircraft transport ship, she was laid up post-war. In 1964, she was converted to a barge with a nuclear power station on board. The work was done by Alabama Shipbuilding & Drydock Co. She was lengthenedby 212 feet (65 m) and her beam was widened to 65 feet (20 m). Renamed Sturgis, she was operated by the United States Army Corps of Engineers. Laid up in the James River after withdrawal from service, She was scrapped in 2019.

== Charles Henderson ==
Charles Henderson was built by Delta Shipbuilding Company. Her keel was laid on 7 April 1943. She was launched on 10 May and delivered on 25 May. Built for the WSA, she was operated under the management of Mississippi Shipping Co. Caught fire and exploded at Bari, Italy on 9 April 1945. The stern part of the ship was obliterated. The bow section was sold to Genoa shipbreakers in 1948.

== Charles H. Herty ==
Charles H. Herty was built by Southeastern Shipbuilding Corporation. Her keel was laid on 2 October 1943. She was launched on 17 November and delivered on 30 November. She was scrapped at Panama City, Florida in 1967.

== Charles H. Lanham ==
Charles H. Lanham was built by Todd Houston Shipbuilding Corporation. Her keel was laid on 25 January 1945. She was launched on 7 March and delivered on 17 March. Built for the WSA, she was operated under the management of American Liberty Steamship Co. Management transferred to United States Lines in 1946, then to Shephard Steamship Co. later that year. Laid up in the James River in 1949, she was sold in 1951 to Terrace Navigation Corp., New York and renamed Thunderbird. Sold in 1956 to Sagamore Navigation Corp. Reflagged to Liberia and operated under the management of James W. Elwell & Co. Sold in 1961 to Providence Navigation Co., Nassau, Bahamas. Reflagged to the United Kingdom, remaining under the same management. Sold in 1963 to Kai Lee Maritime Lines, Taipei and renamed New Kailing. Scrapped at Kaohsiung in December 1967.

== Charles H. Marshall ==
Charles H. Marshall

Charles H. Marshall was built by J. A. Jones Construction Company, Panama City. Her keel was laid on 11 October 1944. She was launched on 17 November and delivered on 27 November. Built for the WSA, she was operated under the management of Polarus Steamship Co., New York. Sold to her managers in 1947, she was renamed Polaris Pioneer in 1949. Sold in 1951 to American Union Transport Inc., New York and renamed Transamerican. Sold in 1954 to Rutland Navigation Corp. and renamed Gertrud Therese. Placed under the flag of Liberia and the management of Transamerican Steamship Corp., New York. Sold in 1959 to Pacific Thunder Steamship Corp and renamed Pacific Thunder. Reflagged to the United States, remaining under the same management. Sold to her managers in 1960 and renamed Transmariner. Sold in 1961 to Liberty Navigation & Trading Co. Placed under the management of J. H. Winchester & Co. Returned to the United States Government in 1963 and laid up in the James River. Scrapped at Santander in June 1972.

== Charles H. Shaw ==
Charles H. Shaw was built by New England Shipbuilding Corporation. Her keel was laid on 21 February 1945. She was launched as Charles H. Shaw on 19 April and delivered as Lesvos on 19 May. To the Greek Government under Lend-Lease. Sold in 1946 to Livanos Maritime Co. and renamed Meandros. Renamed Alfios in 1962. Sold in 1964 to Atlantic Freighters Ltd. and renamed Atlantic Sailor. Remaining under the Greek flag and operated under the management of S. Livanos. Scrapped at Kaohsiung in April 1967.

== Charles H. Windham ==
Charles H. Windham was built by California Shipbuilding Corporation. Her keel was laid on 15 March 1943. She was launched on 10 April and delivered on 23 April. She was scrapped at Baltimore in March 1960.

== Charles J. Colden ==
Charles J. Colden was built by Permanente Metals Corporation. Her keel was laid on 10 May 1944. She was launched on 31 May and delivered on 8 June. Laid up in the James River post-war, she was scrapped at Kearny in November 1971.

== Charles J. Finger ==
Charles J. Finger was built by Todd Houston Shipbuilding Corporation. Her keel was laid on 8 December 1943. She was launched on 28 January 1944 and delivered on 8 February. Built for the WSA, she was operated under the management of Overlakes Freight Corporation. Sold in 1947 to Det Ostasiatische Kompagni, Copenhagen, Denmark and renamed St. Thomas. Sold in 1951 to Aragon Compania Navigation, Panama and renamed Cavostaras. Operated under the management of Orion Shipping & Trading Co. Sold in 1953 to Compania Europa Commerciales y Maritima, Panama and renamed Despina. Renamed Amfithea in 1959 and reflagged to Greece. Sold in 1964 to Chowggule Steamships Co., Goa, India and renamed Maratha Explorer. Sold in 1966 to Pent-Ocean Steamships, Bombay and renamed Samudra Vijay. Scrapped at Bombay in August 1970.

== Charles J. Folger ==
Charles J. Folger was built by Permanente Metals Corporation. Her keel was laid on 15 December 1942. She was launched on 12 January 1943 and delivered on 24 January. She was scrapped at Baltimore in April 1960.

== Charles John Seghers ==
Charles John Seghers was built by Permanente Metals Corporation. Her keel was laid on 17 February 1944. She was launched on 7 March and delivered on 15 March. Built for the WSA, she was operated under the management of Weyerhaeuser Steamship Co. Sold in 1946 to Garibaldia Società Co-op di Navigazione a Resp., Genoa and renamed Caprera. Scrapped at Vado Ligure in December 1968.

== Charles L. McNary ==
Charles L. McNary was built by Todd Houston Shipbuilding. Her keel was laid on 11 October 1944. She was launched on 16 November and delivered on 25 November. She was scrapped at Terminal Island in April 1966.

== Charles Lummis ==
Charles Lummis was built by California Shipbuilding Corporation. Her keel was laid on 13 April 1943. She was launched on 5 May and delivered on 18 May. She was scrapped at Portland, Oregon in May 1965.

== Charles M. Conrad ==
Charles M. Conrad was built by Permanente Metals Corporation. Her keel was laid on 7 October 1942. She was launched on 14 November and delivered on 27 November. She was scrapped at Tacoma in August 1963.

== Charles M. Hall ==
Charles M. Hall was built by Permanente Metals Corporation. Her keel was laid on 5 September 1942. She was launched on 16 October and delivered on 26 October. She struck a submerged object in the Seine on 6 October 1945 and was subsequently laid up in the James River. Declared a constructive total loss, she was scrapped in Baltimore in 1958.

== Charles Morgan ==
Charles Morgan was built by Todd Houston Shipbuilding Corporation. Her keel was laid on 20 October 1943. She was launched on 30 November and delivered on 11 December. Built for the WSA, she was operated under the management of United Fruit Company. Bombed and sunk off Utah Beach, Normandy, France on 10 June 1944. Salvage attempts were abandoned the next day and she was declared a total loss.

== Charles M. Russell ==
Charles M. Russell was built by Oregon Shipbuilding Corporation. Her keel was laid on 18 July 1943. She was launched on 7 August and delivered on 14 August. Built for the WSA, she was operated under the management of Coastwise Line. Sold in 1947 to Scindia Steam Navigation Co., Bombay and renamed Jalakendra. Sold in 1961 to Alberta Shipping Co. and renamed Herakles. Reflagged to the Lebanon and operated under the management of Frinton Shipbrokers. Management transferred to Pegasus Ocean Services in 1964. Scrapped at Onomichi, Japan in April 1968.

== Charles M. Schwab ==
Charles M. Schwab was built by Bethlehem Fairfield Shipyard. Her keel was laid on 1 March 1943. She was launched on 7 April and delivered on 16 April. Laid up in the Hudson River post-war, she was scrapped in August 1970, either at Kearny or Panama City, Florida.

== Charles N. Cole ==
Charles N. Cole was built by New England Shipbuilding Corporation. Her keel was laid on 18 December 1944. She was launched on 21 February 1945 and delivered on 7 March. Built for the WSA, she was operated under the management of Stockard Steamship Corp. Laid up in 1948, she was sold in 1951 to Universal Oil Carriers, New York and renamed Audrey II. Sold in 1955 to West Coast Steamship Co., Portland, Oregon and renamed Pacific Trader. Sold in 1963 to Saxis Steamship Co. and renamed Warm Springs. Operated under the management of Columbia Steamship Co. Sold in 1966 to Maiden Steamship Corp. and renamed Barbara. Operated under the management of Maritime Leasing Ltd. Scrapped at Hong Kong in August 1967.

== Charles N. McGroarty ==
Charles N. McGroarty was built by Permanente Metals Corporation. Her keel was laid on 24 June 1943. She was launched on 15 July and delivered on 26 July. She was scrapped at Oakland, California in December 1959.

== Charles Nordhoff ==
Charles Nordhoff was built by Oregon Shipbuilding Corporation. Her keel was laid on 17 September 1943. She was launched on 2 October and delivered on 10 October. She was scrapped at Bilbao in July 1970.

== Charles Paddock ==
Charles Paddock was built by California Shipbuilding Corporation. Her keel was laid on 2 December 1943. She was launched on 26 December and delivered on 13 January 1944. Built for the WSA, she was operated under the management of Seas Shipping Co. Driven ashore at Gibraltar in January 1946. Management transferred to T. J. Stevenson & Co. in 1948. Laid up in 1949, she was sold in 1951 to Ocean Freighting & Brokerage Corp., New York and renamed Kenneth H. Stevenson. Sold in 1962 to Artemision Steamship Co., Panama and renamed Skiathos. Reflagged to Liberia and operated under the management of Northern Ships Agency. Sold in 1966 to Hercules Navigation, Panama and renamed Demitrios. Remaining under the Liberian flag and operated under the management of Carras Maritime Corp. Sprang a leak and sank off Diego Suarez, Madagascar (9°20′S 48°30′E) on 12 July 1967 whilst on a voyage from Bombay to a Polish port.

== Charles Piez ==
Charles Piez was built by Bethlehem Fairfield Shipyard. Her keel was laid on 2 March 1943. She was launched on 10 April and delivered on 22 April. She was scrapped at Hamburg in July 1961.

== Charles P. Steinmetz ==
Charles P. Steinmetz was built by Permanente Metals Corporation. Her keel was laid on 4 February 1943. She was launched on 4 March and delivered on 15 March. She was scrapped at Panama City, Florida in May 1962.

== Charles Robinson ==
Charles Robinson was built by Permanente Metals Corporation. Her keel was laid on 8 June 1943. She was launched on 28 June and delivered on 12 July. Built for the WSA, she was operated under the management of Pope & Talbot. Sold in 1947 to Compagnia Italiana Maritima, Rome, Italy and renamed Saronno. Scrapped at La Spezia in September 1963.

== Charles Scribner ==
Charles Scribner was built by Bethlehem Fairfield Shipyard. Her keel was laid on 10 October 1943. She was launched on 6 November and delivered on 15 November. Built for the WSA, she was operated under the management of W. Rountree Co. Sold in 1947 to Marian Navigation Co. and renamed Sea Prince. Reflagged to Panama and operated under the management of American Shipping & Transport Corp. Sold in 1948 to Scindia Steam Navigation Co., Bombay and renamed Jalamayur. Reflagged to the United Kingdom. Reflagged to India in 1957. Sold in 1968 to Pent-Ocean Steamships, Bombay and renamed Samudra Daya. Sold for scrapping at Bombay in October 1973.

== Charles S. Fairchild ==
Charles S. Fairchild was built by Permanente Metals Corporation. Her keel was laid on 19 December 1942. She was launched on 17 January 1943 and delivered on 28 January. To the Soviet Union under Lend-Lease and renamed Krasnohvardeyets. Reported scrapped in the Soviet Union in 1971. Deleted from shipping registers in 1981.

== Charles S. Haight ==
Charles S. Haight was built by J. A. Jones Construction Company, Brunswick. Her keel was laid on 15 August 1944. She was launched on 23 September and delivered on 3 October. Built for the WSA, she was operated under the management of Marine Transit Co. Ran aground on the Avery Ledge, off Cape Ann, Massachusetts on 2 April 1946 whilst on a voyage from Newport to Boston, Massachusetts. Declared a total loss, she caught fire on 17 August during salvage operations and was burnt out.

== Charles Sumner ==
Charles Sumner was built by New England Shipbuilding Corporation. Her keel was laid on 15 February 1943. She was launched on 15 April and delivered on 30 April. She was scrapped at Philadelphia in 1962.

== Charles Tufts ==
Charles Tufts was built by New England Shipbuilding Corporation. Her keel was laid on 1 September 1944. She was launched on 17 October and delivered on 26 October. Built for the WSA, she was operated under the management of Prudential Steamship Corp. Sold in 1951 to North Atlantic Steamship Corp., New York and renamed Mariner. Sold in 1955 to Cayenne Compania Armadora, Panama and renamed Confiaza. Reflagged to Liberia and operated under the management of Diamantis Pateras. Sold in 1956 to Nereid Shipping Co., Panama and renamed Tiryns. Remained under the Liberian flag and operated under the management of Adamanthos Ship Operating Co. Sold in 1964 to Austin Navigation Corp., Liberia and renamed Rossana. Operated under the management of Eddie Steamship Co. Sold in 1965 to Aegean Shipping Co. and renamed Demetra. Operated under the management of Ionian Sea Operators. Sold in 1967 to Eptanisos Shipping Co. and renamed Blue Pennant, remaining under the same management. Scrapped at Sakaide in September 1968.

== Charles T. Yerkes ==
Charles T. Yerkes was a tanker built by California Shipbuilding Corporation. She was completed in December 1943. To the United States Navy as Jaguar. Returned to WSA in 1946 and renamed Charles T. Yerkes. Sold in 1948 to Ocean Tankers Ltd, Dover, Delaware and renamed Harry Peer. Operated under the management of Dow & Symmers. Sold in 1949 to Tini Steamship Co., Dover and renamed Tini. Converted to a grain carrier. She was driven ashore near Cape Le Havre, France on 15 November 1950. She was refloated on 17 November. Sold in 1951 to Compania de Navigation Las Cruces, Panama and renamed Illenano. Operated under the management of Carras Ltd. Sold in 1954 to S. N. Difonos, Athens, Greece. Remained under the Panamanian flag and same managers. Ran aground on the Prong's Reef, off the Prong's Lighthouse, India on 4 June 1954 whilst on a voyage from Fremantle to Bombay and was severely damaged. Declared a constructive total loss. She was sold to Bombay shipbreakers and scrapped.

== Charles W. Eliot ==
Charles W. Eliot was built by New England Shipbuilding Corporation. Her keel was laid on 6 April 1943. She was launched on 24 May and delivered on 31 May. Built for the WSA, she was operated under the management of Sprague Steamship Co. She struck two mines off Juno Beach, Normandy on 28 June 1944 whilst on a voyage from Normandy to the United Kingdom. She was towed into deep water, sinking by the stern. Attacked and sunk by Luftwaffe aircraft.

== Charles Wilkes ==
Charles Wilkes was built by Permanente Metals Corporation. Her keel was laid on 2 January 1943. She was launched on 7 February and delivered on 20 February. To the Soviet Union and renamed Kolkoshnik. Reported scrapped in the Soviet Union in 1976. Deleted from shipping registers in 1983.

== Charles Willson Peale ==
Charles Willson Peale was built by Oregon Shipbuilding Corporation. Her keel was laid on 11 November 1942. She was launched on 7 December and delivered on 15 December. Successfully fought off an attack by U-199 50 nautical miles (93 km) south of Rio de Janeiro, Brazil on 27 June 1943. Scrapped at Baltimore in June 1960.

== Charles W. Stiles ==
Charles W. Stiles was built by J. A. Jones Construction Company, Brunswick. Her keel was laid on 9 September 1944. She was launched on 18 October and delivered on 31 October. Built for the WSA, she was operated under the management of Seas Shipping Co. Sold in 1947 to Global Transport Ltd., Panama and renamed Global Shipper. Sold in 1948 to Torvald Klaveness Rederi, Oslo, Norway and renamed Bygdin. Sold in 1949 to Skibs A/S Akershus and renamed Aura. Operated under the management of Gorrissen & Klaveness. Sold in 1950 to Skibs A/S Akersviken, remaining under the same management. Management transferred to Torvald Klaveness Rederi in 1958. Sold in 1959 to Raoussa Compania Navigation, Panama and renamed Florentia. Operated under the management of Embiricos Ltd. Renamed Metamorfosis in 1964. Scrapped in China in March 1969.

== Charles W. Wooster ==
Charles W. Wooster was built by Delta Shipbuilding Company. Her keel was laid on 6 April 1944. She was launched on 20 April and delivered on 31 May. She was scrapped at Brownsville in December 1969.

== Charlotte Cushman ==
Charlotte Cushman was built bh Permanente Metals Corporation. Her keel was laid on 27 March 1944. She was launched on 15 April and delivered on 22 April. She was scrapped at Tacoma in March 1961.

== Charlotte P. Gilman ==
Charlotte P. Gilman was a tanker built by California Shipbuilding Corporation. She was completed in October 1943. Built for the WSA, she was operated under the management of Los Angeles Tanker Operators Inc. To the Soviet Union under Lend-Lease in 1944 and renamed Apsherson. Returned to USMC in 1948 and renamed Charlotte P. Gilman. Laid up in the Hudson River. Sold in 1951 to Hess Inc. Perth Amboy, New Jersey and renamed Hess Bunker. Sold in 1954 to San Rafael Compania Navigation, Panama and renamed Aegeus. Reflagged to Liberia and operated under the management of Orion Shipping & Trading Co. Converted to a cargo ship at Schiedam in 1955, then lengthened at Maizuru later that year to 511 feet 6 inches (155.91 m). Assessed at 8,394 GRT. Renamed Andros Eagle in 1957. Sold in 1960 to Monterey Shipping Corp and renamed Evinos. Reflagged to Greece, remaining under the same management. Sold in 1962 to Vari Compania SA, Panama and renamed Vari. Remaining under the Greek flag and operated under the management of Trans-Ocean Steamship Agency. Sold in 1965 to Syra Compania Maritima, Panama and renamed Syra, remaining under the same flag and managers. Sold in 1967 to Far Eastern Marine Transport Co., Seoul and renamed Halla. Scrapped at Masan in 1972.

== Chatham C. Lyon ==
Chatham C. Lyon was built by North Carolina Shipbuilding Company. Her keel was laid on 28 June 1943. She was launched on 27 July and delivered on 12 August. She was scrapped at Kearny in May 1967.

== Chief Charlot ==
Chief Charlot was built by Permanente Metals Corporation. Her keel was laid on 19 September 1943. She was launched on 12 October and delivered on 21 October. She was scrapped at Seattle in December 1958.

== Chief Joseph ==
Chief Joseph was built by Oregon Shipbuilding Corporation. Her keel was laid on 7 March 1943. She was launched on 27 March and delivered on 4 April. Built for the WSA, she was operated under the management of Sudden & Christenson. To the United States War Department, then lent to the Chinese Government in 1946. Sold to China Merchants Steam Navigation Company in 1947 and renamed Hai Chang. Departed from Kaohsiung for Keelung, Taiwan on 14 October 1962. Subsequently foundered off Penghu (approximately 23°38′N 119°50′E).

== Chief Osceola ==
Chief Osceola was built by J. A. Jones Construction Company, Panama City. Her keel was laid on 28 August 1944. She was launched on 4 October and delivered on 19 October. Built for the WSA, she was operated under the management of United States Navigation Co. Sold in 1947 to George D. Gratsos Ltd., Athens and renamed George D. Gratsos. Ran aground in the Chacao Channel on 26 July 1965 and was severely damaged. Subsequently, laid up at Athens. Scrapped at Valencia, Spain in May 1967.

== Chief Ouray ==
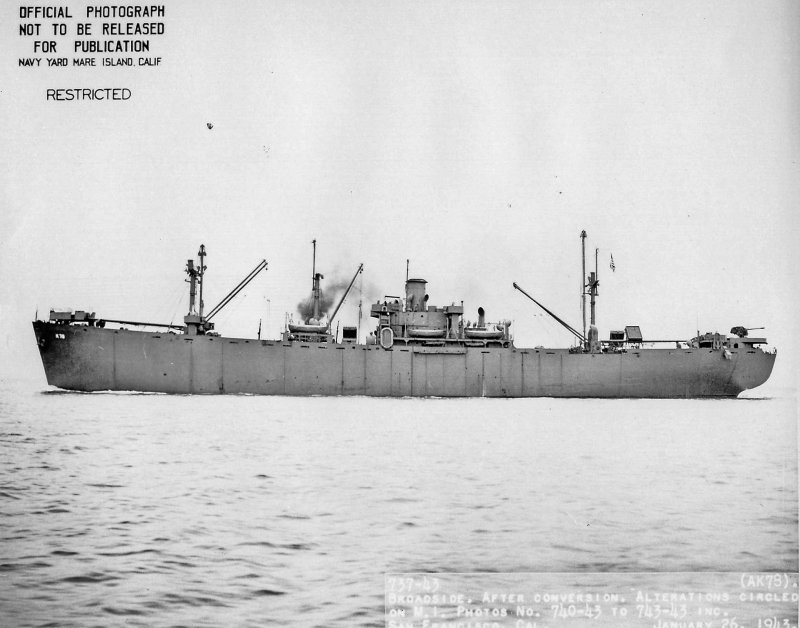
USS Deimos

Chief Ouray was built by Permanente Metals Corporation. Her keel was laid on 27 November 1942. She was launched on 28 December and delivered on 12 January 1943. To the United States Navy, renamed Deimos. Torpedoed and damaged by Ro-103 off Guadalcanal, Solomon Islands on 23 June 1943 whilst on a voyage from Guadalcanal to Espiritu Santo. She was scuttled by USS O'Bannon.

== Chief Washakie ==
Chief Washakie was built by Oregon Shipbuilding Corporation. Her keel was laid on 30 November 1942. She was launched on 24 December and delivered on 31 December. Built for the WSA, she was operated under the management of Northland Transportation Co., Seattle. Sold to her managers in 1948. Sold in 1949 to Alaska Steamship Co., Seattle. Renamed Chena in 1950. Converted to a container ship in 1953. Scrapped at Kaohsiung in December 1971.

== Chilton Seam ==
Chilton Seam was a collier built by Delta Shipbuilding Corporation. Her keel was laid on 19 April 1945. She was launched on 16 June and delivered on 17 August. Built for the WSA, she was operated under the management of Union Sulphur Company. Sold in 1946 to A. H. Bull Steamship Co., New York and renamed Mae Scrapped at Hirao in May 1963.

== C. H. M. Jones ==
C. H. M. Jones was built by New England Shipbuilding Corporation. Her keel was laid on 14 July 1944. She was launched on 31 August and delivered on 9 September. She was scrapped at Kearny, New Jersey in 1961.

== Chourre ==
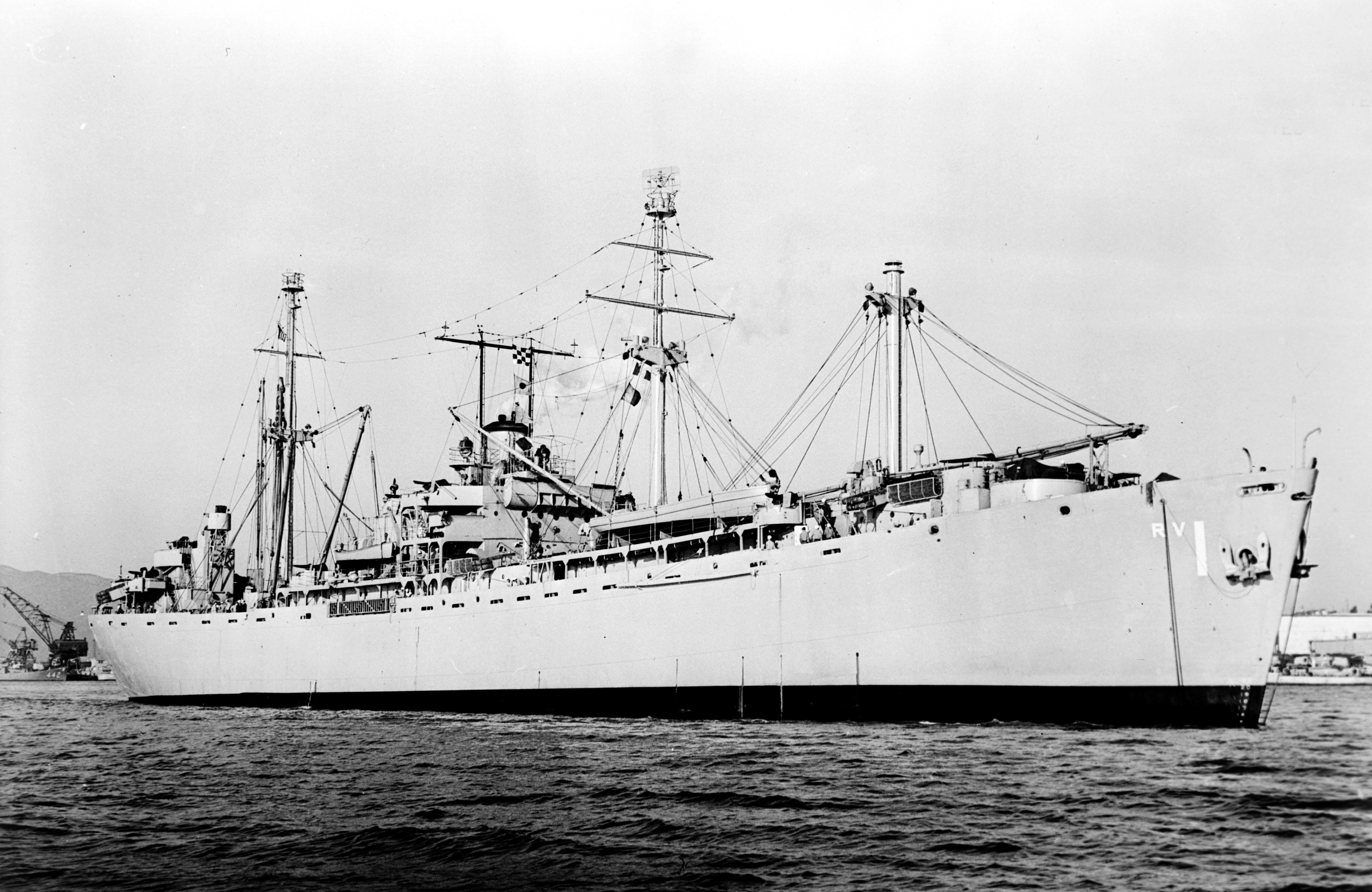
USS Chourre

Chourre was built by Bethlehem Fairfield Shipyards. Her keel was laid on 20 April 1944. She was launched as Dumaran on 22 May and delivered as Chourre on 31 May. Built for the United States Navy, she was laid up at Stockton, California in November 1948. Recommissioned in February 1952, she was laid up in Suisun Bay in September 1955. She was sold to American shipbreakers in February 1971.

== Christian Bergh ==
Christian Bergh was built by Delta Shipbuilding Company. Her keel was laid on 1 August 1944. She was launched on 11 September and delivered on 16 October. Built for the WSA, she was operated under the management of Standard Fruit & Steamship Co. Sold in 1948 to Albatross Steamship Co., New York. Sold in 1952 to North Seas Navigation Corp., New York and renamed Seavigil Operated under the management of Orion Shipping & Trading Co. Sold in 1953 to Ocean Transportation Co. and renamed Ocean Nimit. Operated under the management of Maritime Overseas Corp. Sold in 1961 to Doric Shipping & Trading Co. and renamed Evicynthia. Operated under the management of Starboard Shipping Inc. Sold in 1964 to Peggy Navigation Co., Panama and renamed Loyal Defenders. Reflagged to Liberia and operated under the management of China Marine Investment Co. Scrapped at Aioi in January 1967.

== Christian Michelson ==
Christian Michelson was built by Bethlehem Fairfield Shipyard. Her keel was laid on 27 April 1943. She was launched as John T. Finney on 21 May and delivered as Christian Michelson on 31 May. She was torpedoed and damaged in the Mediterranean Sea 80 nautical miles (150 km) west of Bizerta, Algeria by U-410 on 26 September 1943 whilst on a voyage from New York to Bizerta. She subsequently exploded and sank.

== Christopher C. Andrews ==
Christopher C. Andrews was built by Permanente Metals Corporation. Her keel was laid on 28 May 1943. She was launched on 24 June and delivered on 10 July. To the United States Navy as Hyperion. Returned to WSA in November 1945 and renamed Christopher C. Andrews. Scrapped at Baltimore in August 1961.

== Christopher Gadsden ==
Christopher Gadsden was built by North Carolina Shipbuilding Company. Her keel was laid on 15 November 1942. She was launched on 18 December and delivered on 31 December. She was scrapped at New Orleans in November 1970.

== Christopher Gale ==
Christopher Gale was built by North Carolina Shipbuilding Company. Her keel was laid on 19 February 1943. She was launched on 21 March and delivered on 28 March. She was scrapped in New Orleans in 1962.

== Christopher Greenup ==
Christopher Greenup was built by Oregon Shipbuilding Corporation. Her keel was laid on 11 February 1943. She was launched on 5 March and delivered on 15 March. She was scrapped at Tacoma in June 1962.

== Christopher L. Sholes ==
Christopher L. Sholes was a tanker built by California Shipbuilding Corporation. She was completed in October 1943. Built for the WSA, she was operated under the management of Spencer Kellogg & Sons. Management transferred to Keystone Tankship Corp in 1946. Sold in 1948 to Southeastern Oil Inc., Jacksonville, Florida. Sold in 1950 to Petróleos Mexicanos, Mexico City and renamed Escolin. Renamed Ciudad Modero later that year. Scrapped at Tampico, Mexico in 1966.

== Christopher Newport ==
Christopher Newport was built by Bethlehem Fairfield Shipyard. Her keel was laid on 25 August 1941. She was launched on 15 February 1942 and delivered on 30 March. Torpedoed and damaged in the Barents Sea by Luftwaffe aircraft on 4 July 1942 whilst on a voyage from Reykjavík, Iceland to a port in the north of the Soviet Union. HMS P614 attempted to scuttle her. Torpedoed and sunk (75°49′N 25°15′E by U-457.

== Christopher S. Flanaghan ==
Christopher S. Flanaghan was built by Todd Houston Shipbuilding Company. Her keel was laid on 18 February 1944. She was launched on 27 March and delivered on 7 April. She was scrapped at Portland, Oregon in November 1963.

== Christy Mathewson ==
Christy Mathewson was built by Permanente Metals Corporation. Her keel was laid on 18 April 1943. She was launched on 14 May and delivered on 26 May. Scrapped at Tsuneishi, Japan in September 1960.

== Chung Cheng ==
Chung Cheng was built by Permanente Metals Corporation. Her keel was laid on 19 August 1943. She was launched as Murat Halstead on 13 September and delivered to the Chinese Government as Chung Cheng on 22 September. Torpedoed and sunk in the Arabian Sea (13°26′N 54°30′E) by U-188 on 5 February 1944 whilst on a voyage from Cochin, India to an American port.

== Chung Shan ==
Chung Shan was built by Permanente Metals Corporation. Her keel was laid on 15 August 1943. She was launched as Henry M. Teller on 6 September and delivered as Chung Shan on 14 September. To China under Lend-Lease. Returned to the USMC in 1947 and renamed Henry M. Teller. Operated under the management of Sudden & Christensen. Laid up in the James River in 1949. To United States Department of Commerce in 1951. Operated under the management of Pope & Talbot Inc. Laid up in the James River in 1952. Scrapped at Bilbao in September 1971.

== Chung Tung ==
Chung Tung was built by Bethlehem Fairfield Shipyard. Her keel was laid on 7 March 1944. She was launched as William Hodson on 8 April and delivered as Chung Tung on 18 April. To China under Lend-Lease. Returned to USMC in 1947 and renamed Arthur P. Fairfield. Renamed Admiral Arthur P. Fairfield in 1948, operated under the management of American Pacific Steamship Co. Management transferred to Pacific Far East Line in 1949. Laid up in 1950, then sold in 1951 to Pacific Cargo Carriers Corp. and renamed Sea Coronet. Operated under the management of Orion Shipping & Trading Co. Sold in 1954 to Alaska Steamship Co. and renamed Tonsina. Modified to carry containers. Converted to a container ship in 1964, able to carry 175 24 ft containers. Scrapped at Sakaide in June 1970.

== C. J. Jones ==
C. J. Jones was built by Oregon Shipbuilding Corporation. Her keel was laid on 26 July 1943. She was launched as C. J. Jones on 14 August, and delivered as Sambut on 21 August. Built for the Ministry of War Transport (MoWT), she was operated under the management of P. Henderson & Co. Shelled and sunk in the Strait of Dover (51°08′N 1°35′E) by shore-based artillery on 6 June 1944 whilst on a voyage from the River Thames to Normandy.

== C. K. McClatchy ==
C. K. McClatchy was built by California Shipbuilding Corporation. Her keel was laid on 10 February 1944. She was launched on 7 March and delivered on 29 March. Built for the WSA, she was operated under the management of Matson Navigation Co. To the Italian Government in 1947 and renamed Ambra. Transferred to Lloyd Triestino. Sold in 1963 to San Antonio Inc. Renamed Andarin and reflagged to Panama. Operated under the management of Compagnia Armatoriale Italiana. Scrapped at Hirao in August 1968.

== Clara Barton ==
Clara Barton was built by California Shipbuilding Corporation. Her keel was laid on 19 July 1942. She was launched on 25 August and delivered on 12 September. Laid up in the James River post-war, she was scrapped at Darıca, Turkey in October 1970.

== Clarence Darrow ==
Clarence Darrow was built by California Shipbuilding Corporation. Her keel was laid on 30 April 1943. She was launched on 23 May and delivered on 6 June. Built for the WSA, she was operated under the management of Matson Navigation Co. Sold in 1947 to Det Forenede D/S A/S, Copenhagen and renamed Oregon. Sold in 1957 to White Cross Maritime Ltd. and renamed White Cross. Reflagged to Liberia and operated under the management of S. Livanos Ltd. Sold in 1960 to United White Shipping Ltd., Liberia, remaining under the same management. Sold in 1964 to Century Shipping Lines, Manila and renamed Don Ramon. Renamed Safe Philippine Anchorage in 1965. Scrapped at Kaohsiung in 1968.

== Clarence F. Peck ==
Clarence F. Peck was built by New England Shipbuilding Corporation. Her keel was laid on 20 December 1944. She was launched on 10 February 1945 and delivered on 28 February. Built for the WSA, she was operated under the management of Shephard Steamship Co. Sold inn 1947 to Society Maritime San Nicolas of Panama and renamed Eurystheus. Operated under the management of Atlas Trading Corp. Reflagged to Honduras in 1951 and placed under the management of Petmar Agencies. Reflagged to Liberia in 1952. Sold later that year to Compania de Vapores san Antonio, Panama. Remained under the Liberian flag but management transferred to P. D. Marchessini & Co. Struck a reef off Goa, Portuguese India in July 1960 but arrived at Bombay safely. Sold in 1961 to Marchessini Lines and renamed Esfahan. Remaining under the same flag and management. Sold later that year to Sotiras Compania Maritime, Panama and renamed Fotini P. Reflagged to Greece and placed under the management of Phoenix Maritime Agencies. Scrapped at Shodoshima, Japan in June 1967.

== Clarence H. Matson ==
Clarence H. Matson was built by California Shipbuilding Corporation. Her keel was laid on 13 December 1944. She was launched on 8 January 1944 and delivered on 26 January. She was scrapped at Portland, Oregon in November 1969.

== Clarence King ==
Clarence King was built by Permanente Metals Corporation. Her keel was laid on 11 June 1943. She was launched on 1 July and delivered on 13 July. Built for the WSA, she was operated under the management of Mississippi Shipping Co. Sold in 1947 to Atlantic Maritime Co. and renamed Atlantic Pilot. Operated under the management of Boyd, Weir & Sewell Inc. Sold in 1948 to Compania Carreto di Navigaiton, Panama. Renamed Pilot in 1953. Sold in 1959 to Dernia Compania de Navigation, Panama and renamed Anastasia IV. Operated under the management of J. Livanos & Sons. Sold in 1964 to Cardinal Seafaring Lines and renamed Amazon River. Reflagged to the United Kingdom, remaining under the same managers. Ran aground on the Seranilla Bank, 200 nautical miles (370 km) south west of Jamaica on 17 May 1964 whilst on a voyage from Cuba to a Japanese port. Refloated on 27 May and towed in to Kingston, Jamaica. Towed to Curaçao in October, declared a constructive total loss. Sold for breaking in 1965 and renamed River. Arrived at Genoa under tow on 25 December 1966. Moved to Vado Ligure on 18 February 1967. She subsequently sank, presumed then scrapped.

== Clarence Roberts ==
Clarence Roberts was built by Todd Houston Shipbuilding Corporation. Her keel was laid on 3 October 1944. She was launched on 8 November and delivered on 17 November. Sold for scrapping on 23 January 1964, she was scrapped at Philadelphia in December 1971.

== Clark Howell ==
Clark Howell was built by Southeastern Shipbuilding Corporation. Her keel was laid on 21 January 1944. She was launched on 14 March and delivered on 29 March. Built for the WSA, she was operated under the management of Parry Navigation Co. Sold in 1947 to Anthony D. Stathatos, Athens and renamed Eptanissos. Sold in 1961 to Seafarers Investment Inc., remaining under the Greek flag and placed under the management of Stathatos & Co. Scrapped at Shanghai in May 1967.

== Clark Mills ==
Clark Mills was built by Alabama Drydock Company. She was launched on 30 November 1942, and delivered in December. Torpedoed by an aircraft and damaged off Bizerta (37°20′N 10°20′E) on 9 March 1944 and was beached. Declared a constructive total loss, she was later salvaged. In 1949, she was towed to Barcelona for scrapping, arriving on 24 September.

== Claude Kitchin ==
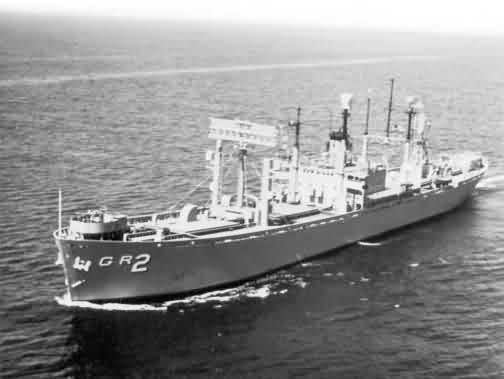
USS Lookout

Claude Kitchin was built by J. A. Jones Construction Co., Panama City. Her keel was laid on 5 April 1945. She was launched on 24 May and delivered on 25 June. A boxed aircraft transport ship, she was acquired by the United States Navy in August 1954. Converted at Charleston Navy Yard to a radar picket ship and renamed Lookout. Placed in reserve in September 1965. Sold to shipbreakers in Bilbao in November 1970.

== Claus Spreckels ==
Claus Spreckels was built by Permanente Metals Corporation. Her keel was laid on 26 November 1943. She was launched on 15 December and deleivered on 22 December. Built for the WSA, she was operated under the management of Lykes Bros. Steamship Co. Sold in 1946 to Società Anonima Industria Armamento, Genoa and renamed Humanitas. Sold in 1962 to Plamar SA, Panama and renamed Albada. Reflagged to Liberia and operated under the management of Olympic Maritime SA. Sold in 1964 to Mediterranean Shipping Co., Beirut, Lebanon and renamed Reneka. Sold in 1966 to San Carlos Shipping Co. and renamed San Carlo. Reflagged to Panama and operated under the management of Levant Shipping Co. Scrapped at La Spezia in May 1966.

== Clement Clay ==
Clement Clay was built by North Carolina Shipbuilding Company. Her keel was laid on 18 July 1943. She was launched on 21 July and delivered on 28 July. She was scrapped at Hirao in February 1962.

== Cleveland Abbe ==
Cleveland Abbe was built by Oregon Shipbuilding Corporation. Her keel was laid on 24 July 1942. She was launched on 31 August and delivered on 12 September. Laid up in the James River post-war, she was scrapped at Castellón de la Plana, Spain in May 1972.

== Cleveland Forbes ==
Cleveland Forbes was built by Permanente Metals Corporation. Her keel was laid on 9 February 1944. She was launched on 26 February and delivered on 6 March . Built for the WSA, she was operated under the management of Inter-Ocean Steamship Co. Management transferred to American Foreign Steamship Co. in 1946. Sold later that year to Compania Argentina de Navigación Dodero, Buenos Aires, Argentina and renamed Lancero. Renamed Resero in 1948. Sold in 1951 to Flota Argentina de Navigación de Ultramar, Buenos Aires. Sold in 1961 to Empresa Lineas Maritimas Argentines, Buenos Aires. Sold in 1964 to Motorex Sudamericana, Panama and renamed Francisco Hache. Sold later that year to Magellan Strait Development Corp., Liberia and renamed Marnic. Ran aground at San Salvador, Bahamas on 15 November 1964 whilst on a voyage from Maracaibo, Venezuela to New York. Refloated on 17 November, declared a constructive total loss. Scrapped at Aviles in March 1965.

== Clifford D. Mallory ==
Clifford D. Mallory was built by Bethlehem Fairfield Shipyard. Her keel was laid on 30 January 1943. She was launched on 11 March and delivered on 26 March. To United States Navy in January 1956. Subsequently, laid up at Mobile. Scrapped at Panama City, Florida in December 1971.

== Clifford E. Ashby ==
Clifford E. Ashby was built by Todd Houston Shipbuilding Corporation. Her keel was laid on 13 January 1945. She was launched on 17 February and delivered on 28 February. Built for the WSA, she was operated under the management of A. H. Bull & Co. Management transferred to Stockard Steamship Corp. in 1946. Sold in 1951 to Aegean Marine Corp., New York and renamed Peconic Bay. Sold in 1952 to Trojan Steamship Corp., New York and renamed Trojan Trader. Sold in 1957 to New England Industries Inc. and renamed Armonk. Operated under the management of Overseas Navigation Corp. Sold in 1960 to Marine Rice Transport Corp. and renamed Marine Rice Queen. Operated under the management of Marine Transport Lines. Sold in 1963 to Bulk Food Carriers, New York and renamed Sello Rojo. Sold in 1964 to United Steam Navigation Co. and renamed Alnfield. Reflagged to the United Kingdom and operated under the management of Hunting & Son Ltd. Sold in 1967 to Cascade Co. Ltd., Hamilton, Bermuda, remaining under the British flag. Reported to have been sold in 1968 to Action S.A. and renamed Ceres and reflagged to Argentina, but the sale was not completed. Scrapped at Vado Ligure in April 1970, still named Alnfield.

== Clinton Kelly ==
Clinton Kelly was built by Oregon Shipbuilding Corporation. Her keel was laid on 11 July 1943. She was launched on 31 July and delivered on 7 August. She was scrapped at Seattle in March 1962.

== Clyde Austin Dunning ==
Clyde Austin Dunning was built by Todd Houston Shipbuilding Corporation. Her keel was laid on 8 November 1944. She was launched on 14 December and delivered on 22 December. Built for the WSA, she was operated under the management of Norton Lilly Management Co. Management transferred to Ponchelet Steamship Co. in 1946 then Pitston Marine Corp. in 1948. Sold in 1951 to Clifton Steamship Corp., New York and renamed Boy. Sold in 1958 to Long, Quinn & Nolan, New York and renamed Joan O'Berg. Sold in 1961 to Charterhouse Corp., New York and renamed Eldermere. Sold later that year to Hanover Steamship Corp. and renamed Ocean Merchant. Reflagged to Greece and operated under the management of Jason Steamship Co. Sold in 1963 to International Union Lines and renamed Union Skipper. Reflagged to Liberia and operated under the management of China Union Lines. Scrapped at Kaohsiung in November 1969.

== Clyde L. Seavey ==
Clyde L. Seavey was built by Permanente Metals Corporation. Her keel was laid on 22 October 1943. She was launched on 16 November and delivered on 26 November. She was scrapped at Richmond in January 1966.

== Coasters Harbor ==
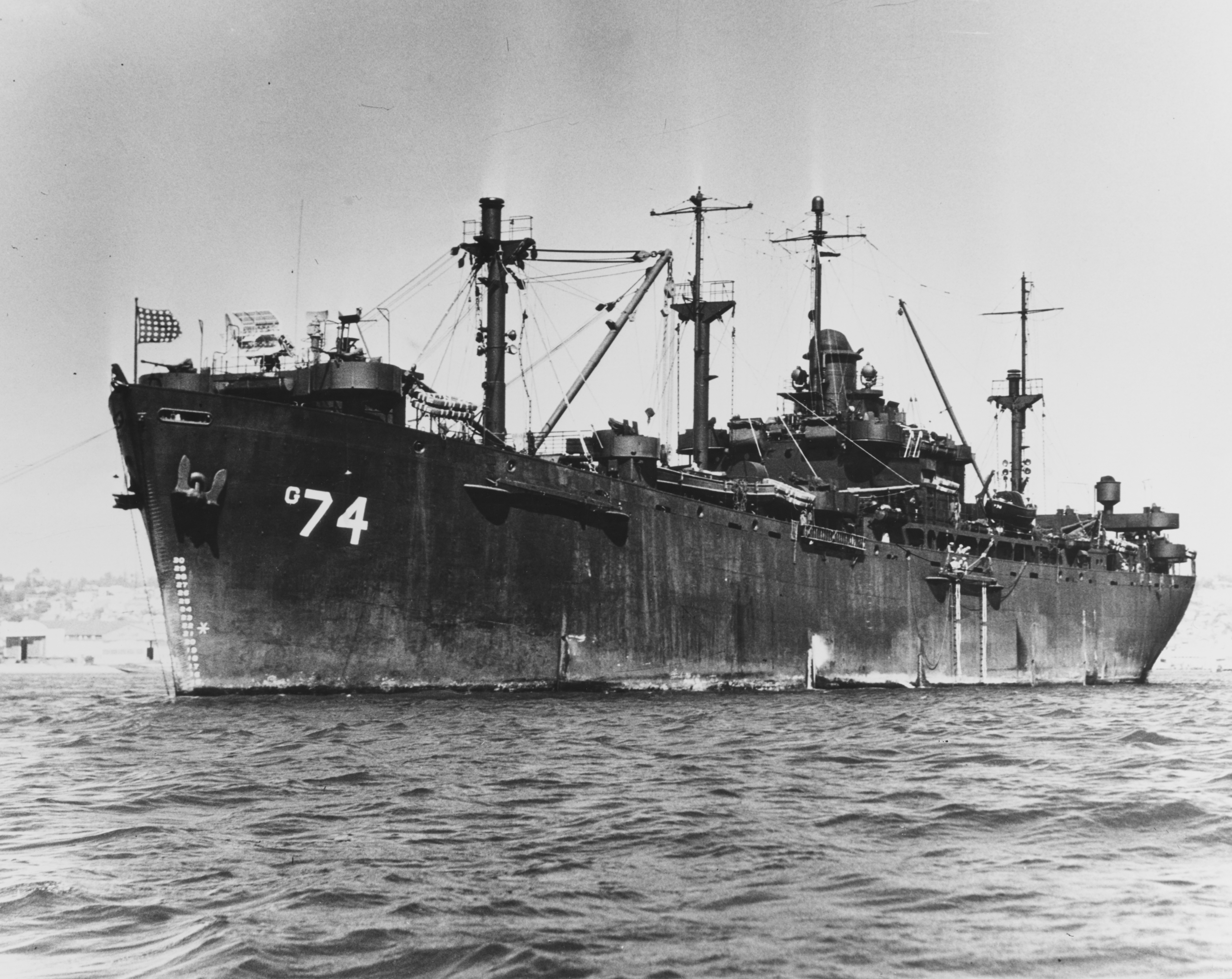
USS Coasters Harbor

Coasters Harbor was built by New England Shipbuilding Corporation. Her keel was laid on 4 October 1944. She was launched on 17 November and delivered 27 November. To the United States Navy, completed by Todd Shipbuilding Company, Brooklyn, New York. Took part in Operation Crossroads in 1946. Placed in reserve at San Diego in July 1947. Struck from the navy in April 1960. Scrapped at Sakai in March 1961.

== Colin P. Kelly Jr. ==
Colin P. Kelly Jr. was built by Alabama Drydock Company. She was launched on 31 December 1942, and delivered in January 1943. Built for the WSA, she was operated under the management of Waterman Steamship Co. Struck a mine off Ostend on 4 June 1945 whilst on a voyage from a British port to Antwerp and was severely damaged. Drydocked at Tilbury, United Kingdom for examination on 3 August. Towed to Sunderland on 29 August. Declared a constructive total loss, she was scrapped at Rotterdam, Netherlands in April 1948.

== Collin McKinney ==
Collin McKinney was built by Delta Shipbuilding Company. Her keel was laid on 28 April 1944. She was launched on 21 June and delivered on 5 August. She was scrapped at Portland, Oregon in January 1967.

== Collis P. Huntington ==
Collis P. Huntington was built by North Carolina Shipbuilding Company. Her keel was laid on 17 September 1942. She was launched on 1 November and delivered on 12 November. She was scrapped at New Orleans in March 1968.

== Conrad Kohrs ==
Conrad Kohrs was built by Permanente Metals Corporation. Her keel was laid on 29 May 1943. She was launched on 19 June and delivered on 30 June. Built for the WSA, she was operated under the management of South Atlantic Steamship Line. Sold in 1947 to Società Anonima Industria Armamento, Genoa and renamed Aequitas II. Scrapped at Hirao in September 1963.

== Conrad Weiser ==
Conrad Weiser was built by Bethlehem Fairfield Shipyard. Her keel was laid on 25 April 1943. She was launched on 21 May and delivered on 29 May. Laid up at Beaumont post-war, she was scuttled off Port Mansfield, Texas on 28 January 1976.

== Cornelia P. Spencer ==
Cornelia P. Spencer was built by North Carolina Shipbuilding Company. Her keel was laid on 29 March 1943. She was launched on 24 April and delivered on 30 April. Built for the WSA, she was operated under the management of A. L. Burbank & Co. Torpedoed and sunk in the Indian Ocean (2°08′N 50°10′E) by U-188 on 21 September 1943 whilst on a voyage from Aden to Durban, Union of South Africa.

== Cornelius Cole ==
Cornelius Cole was built by California Shipbuilding Corporation. Her keel was laid on 28 June 1943. She was launched as Cornelius Cole on 22 July and delivered as Samsurf on 5 August. To MoWT under Lend-Lease. Operated under the management of Cunard White Star Line. Returned to USMC in 1947, officially renamed Cornelius Cole. Laid up at Mobile still bearing name Samsurf. Scrapped at Mobile in April 1961.

== Cornelius Ford ==
Cornelius Ford was built by Walsh-Kaiser Company, Providence, Rhode Island. Her keel was laid on 7 November 1943. She was launched on 19 February 1944 and delivered on 22 May. Laid up in the Hudson River post-war, She was scrapped at Kearny in January 1972.

== Cornelius Gilliam ==
Cornelius Gilliam was built by Oregon Shipbuilding Corporation. Her keel was laid on 5 May 1942. She was launched on 16 June and delivered on 28 June. She was scrapped at Panama City, Florida in April 1970.

== Cornelius Harnett ==
Cornelius Harnett was built by North Carolina Shipbuilding Company. Her keel was laid on 23 September 1942. She was launched on 6 November and delivered on 20 November. She was scrapped at Portland, Oregon in March 1968.

== Cornelius Vanderbilt ==
Cornelius Vanderbilt was built by Permanente Metals Corporation. Her keel was laid on 15 January 1944. She was launched on 2 February and delivered on 10 February. Built for the WSA, she was operated under the management of Alaska Steamship Co. To the United States War Department in 1946. Sold in 1947 to Lloyd Triestino and renamed Stella. Renamed Spuma later that year. Sold in 1964 to Fratelli d'Amico, Rome. Scrapped at Trieste in November 1967.

== Cotton Mather ==
Cotton Mather was built by Bethlehem Fairfield Shipyard. Her keel was laid on 28 September 1942. She was launched on 31 October and delivered on 10 November. She was scrapped at Boston in 1960.

== Crawford W. Long ==
Crawford W. Long was built by Southeastern Shipbuilding Corporation. Her keel was laid on 31 December 1942. She was launched on 10 April 1943 and delivered on 22 May. She was scrapped at Kearny in July 1969.

== Crosby S. Noyes ==
Crosby S. Noyes was built by Bethlehem Fairfield Shipyard. Her keel was laid on 13 June 1943. She was launched on 15 Julyand delivered on 26 July. She was scrapped at Wilmington, Delaware in April 1965.

== Culebra Island ==
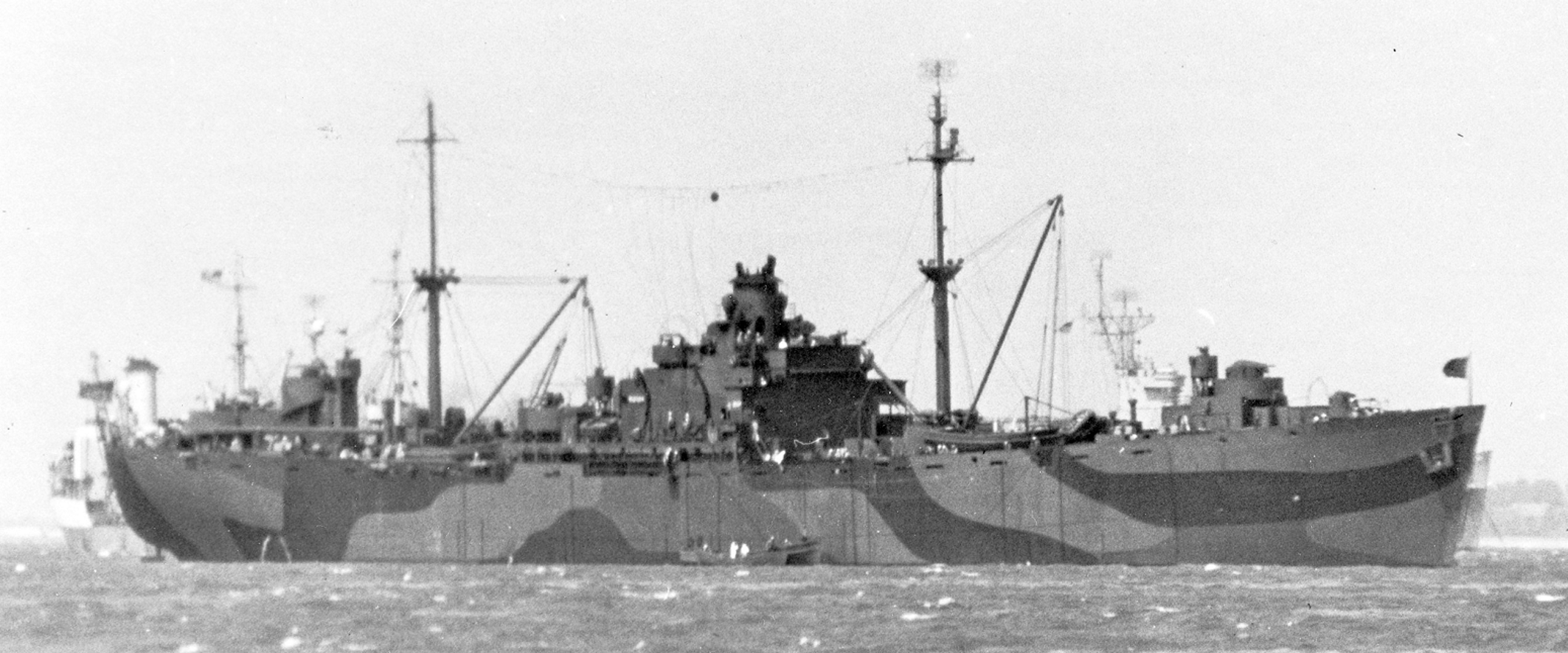
USS Culebra Island

Culebra Island was built by Bethlehem Fairfield Shipyard. Her keel was laid on 29 October 1943. She was launched as John F. Goucher on 23 November and delivered to the United States Navy as Culebra Island on 29 November. Place in reserve at San Diego in November 1946. Subsequently returned to the USMC, renamed John F. Goucher and laid up in Suisun Bay. Scrapped at Portland, Oregon in February 1974.

== Cushing Eells ==
Cushing Eells was built by Oregon Shipbuilding Corporation. Her keel was laid on 7 February 1943. She was launched on 1 March and delivered on 12 March. Built for the WSA, she was operated under the management of American Mail Line. Sold in 1947 to N. C. & A. C. Hadjipateras, Athens and renamed Aghios Nicolaos. Sold in 1960 to Diamond Freighters Corp. and renamed Praotis. Operated under the management of D. Pateras Ltd. Sold in 1961 to Jugoslavenska Plovidba, Split and renamed Jablanica. Scrapped at Split in January 1971.

== Cushman K. Davis ==
Cushman K. Davis was built by Oregon Shipbuilding Corporation. Her keel was laid on 7 April 1943. She was launched on 20 April and delivered on 5 May. She was scrapped at Portland, Oregon in June 1966.

== Cuttyhunk Island ==
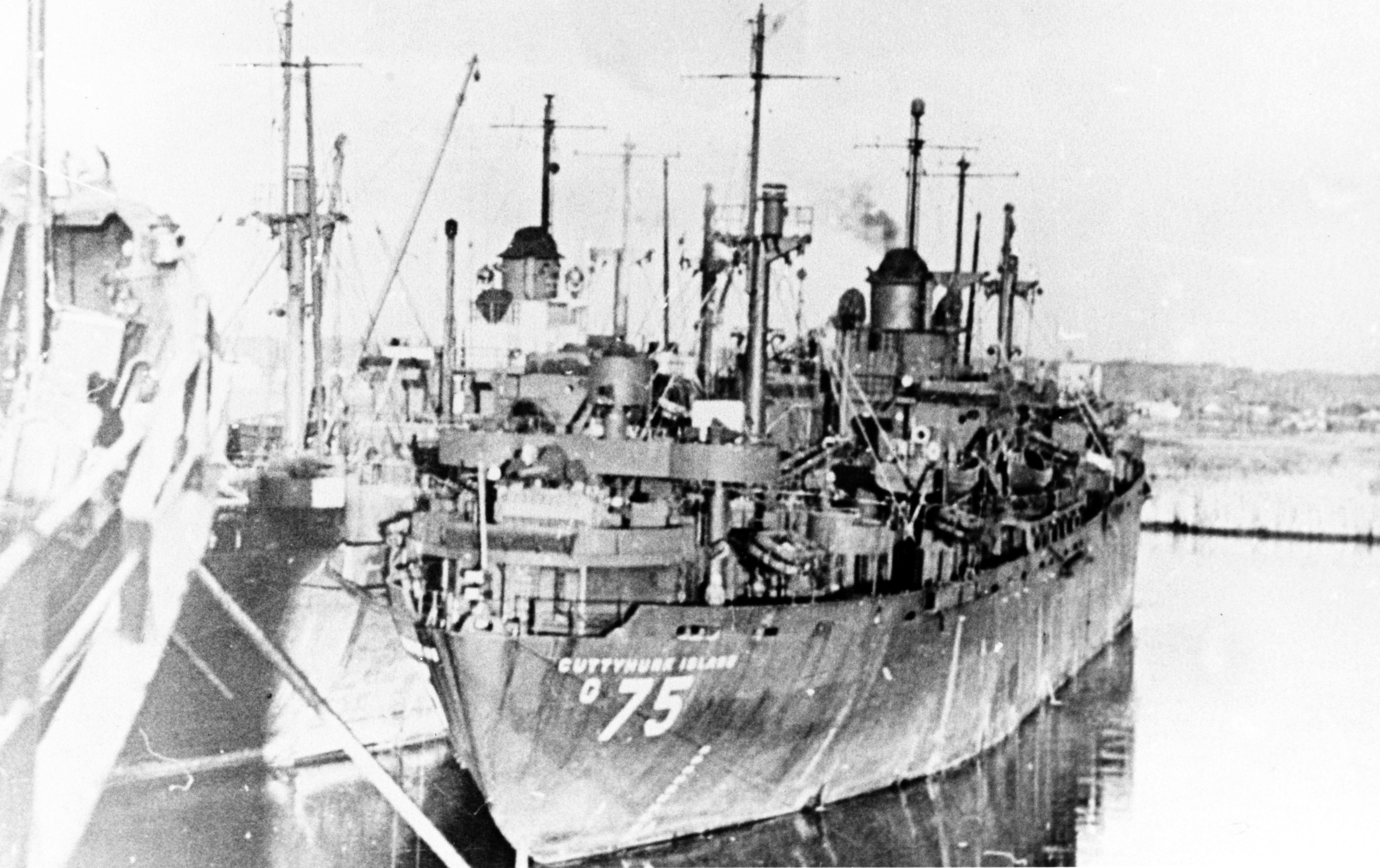
USS Cuttyhunk Island

Cuttyhunk Island was built by New England Shipbuilding Corporation. Her keel was laid on 16 October 1944. She was launched on 26 November. Completed by Eureka Shipbuilding Corp., Newburg, New York, she was delivered to the United States Navy on 7 December. Placed in reserve at Orange, Texas in January 1947. Scrapped at Mobile in September 1960.

== C. W. Post ==
C. W. Post was built by St. Johns River Shipbuilding Company, Jacksonville. Her keel was laid on 6 October 1944. She was launched on 8 November and delivered on 17 November. She was laid up in the James River in November 1944. Sold for scrapping in 1971. Broke free from the tug Dolphin X 240 nautical miles (440 km) east of Cape Henry, Virginia on 17 October 1971 whilst being towed from the Hampton Roads to Santander. The tow was reconnected and the tug put in to Halifax, Canada for repairs. Scrapped at Santander in December 1971.

== Cyril G. Hopkins ==
Cyril G. Hopkins was built by Todd Houston Shipbuilding Corporation. Her keel was laid on 14 October 1944. She was launched on 18 November and delivered as Navarchos Koundouriotis on 28 November. Built for John S. Carras, Chios, Greece. Sold in 1962 to Cardamyla Marine Enterprises. Operated under the management of A. Lusi Ltd. Ran aground at Mar del Plata, Argentina on 20 October 1964 whilst on a voyage from Mar del Plata to Marseille, France. She broke in two and was declared a constructive total loss. Both sections later refloated and scrapped locally.

== Cyrus Adler ==
Cyrus Adler was built by Delta Shipbuilding Company. Her keel was laid on 21 April 1944. She was launched on 19 June and delivered on 26 July. She was scrapped at Baltimore in January 1960.

== Cyrus H. K. Curtis ==
Cyrus H. K. Curtis was built by New England Shipbuilding Corporation. Her keel was laid on 19 July 1943. She was launched on 31 August and delivered on 10 September. She was scrapped at Baltimore in 1958.

== Cyrus Hamlin ==
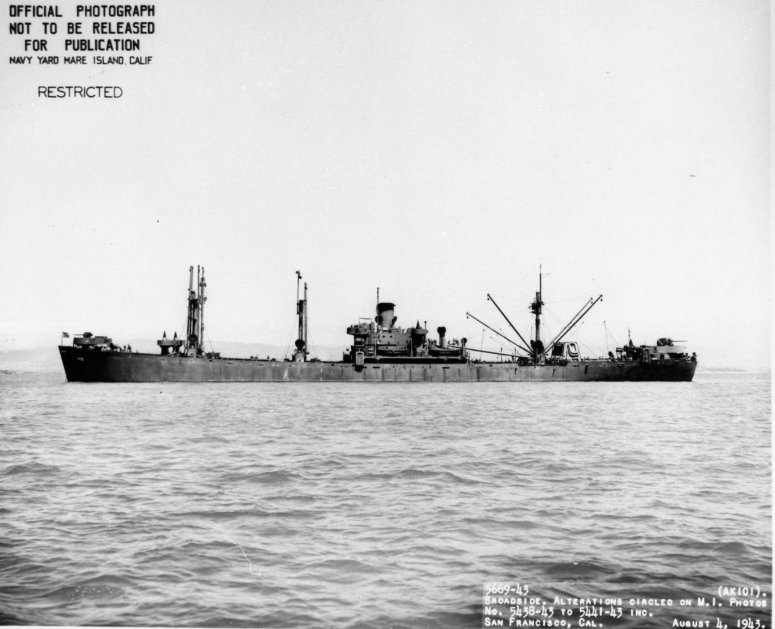
USS Lyra

Cyrus Hamlin was built by Permanente Metals Corporation. Her keel was laid on 25 April 1943. She was launched as Cyrus Hamlin on 24 May and delivered to the United States Navy as Lyra on 10 June. Returned to WSA in 1946 and renamed Cyrus Hamlin. Sold in 1947 to A. G. Pappadikis, Piraeus, Greece and renamed Virginia. Sold in 1964 to Marfrontera Compania Navigation, Panama and renamed Amedeo. Remaining under the Greek flag and operated under the management of Carapanayoti Ltd. Scrapped at Kaohsiung in April 1967.

== Cyrus H. McCormick ==
Cyrus H. McCormick was built by Permanente Metals Corporation. Her keel was laid on 22 August 1942. She was launched on 2 October and delivered on 13 October. Built for the WSA, she was operated under the management of American President Lines. Torpedoed and sunk by U-1107 75 nautical miles (139 km) off Brest, France on 18 April 1945 whilst on a voyage from New York to Antwerp.

== Cyrus K. Holliday ==
Cyrus K. Holliday was a tanker built by California Shipbuilding Corporation. She was completed in November 1943. To the United States Navy and renamed Gazelle. Returned to WSA in May 1946 and renamed Cyrus K. Holliday. Sold in 1948 to Intercontinental Steamship Corp and renamed Evistar. Operated under the management of Triton Shipping Co. Renamed Chrysstar in 1949. Sold in 1950 to Liberian Shipping Inc., Monrovia, Liberia and renamed Chrysanthy, remaining under the same management. Converted to a cargo ship at Antwerp in 1955. Renamed Rhapsody on conversion, she was reflagged to Greece in 1959. Renamed Fos in 1960. Sold in 1966 to Trans-Pacific Shipping Co. and renamed Pacific Logger. Reflagged to Liberia and operated under the management of Lasco Shipping Co. Scrapped at Kaohsiung in September 1968.

== Cyrus T. Brady ==
Cyrus T. Brady was built by Permanente Metals Corporation. Her keel was laid on 13 September 1943. She was launched on 5 October and delivered on 15 October. Laid up in the James River post-war, she was scrapped at Santander in February 1971.

== Cyrus W. Field ==
Cyrus W. Field was built by Permanente Metals Corporation. Her keel was laid on 25 March 1943. She was launched on 23 April and delivered on 6 May. She was scrapped at Wilmington, North Carolina in November 1961.

== Sources ==
- Sawyer, L. A.; Mitchell, W. H. (1985). The Liberty Ships (2nd ed.). London: Lloyd's of London Press Ltd. ISBN 1-85044-049-2.
