= Cotton Mather (disambiguation) =

Cotton Mather (1663–1728) was a Puritan clergyman and author in colonial New England.

Cotton Mather may also refer to:

- Cotton Mather (band), American rock band from Austin, Texas
- Cotton Mather Mills, a pseudonym used by Elizabeth Gaskell (1810–1865), English novelist, biographer and short story writer
- Robert Cotton Mather (1808–1877), English missionary in India
- SS Cotton Mather, Liberty ship built in the United States during World War II
