= Burns Steamship Company =

Former Shipping Company

- Industry: Shipping
- Founded: February 25, 1936 in Los Angeles, United States
- Defunct: 1956
- Key people: Leroy Burns

SS Caddopeak - Lurline Burns, sister ship SS Point Bonita

Burns Steamship Company was a shipping company founded in Los Angeles, California on February 25, 1936, by Leroy Burns. Burns Steamship Company had offices in San Francisco and Los Angeles. Leroy Burns was in the lumber business in Ohio in 1937, before he moved to San Francisco. In San Francisco he purchased the ship SS Caddopeak , his first ship, he renamed her the Lurline Burns. In 1940 he moved to Los Angeles with headquarters in Beverly Hills, California. Burns Steamship Company's ship the SS Lurline Burns was taken over for the World War II effort. Burns Steamship Company closed in 1956.

== World War II ==
Burns Steamship Company operated a fleet of ships that were used to help the World War II effort. During World War II Burns Steamship Company operated Merchant navy ships for the United States Shipping Board. During World War II was active with charter shipping with the Maritime Commission and War Shipping Administration.Burns Steamship Company Liberty ships and Victory ships for the merchant navy. The ship was run by its Burns Steamship Company and the US Navy supplied United States Navy Armed Guards to man the deck guns and radio.

== Ships ==
  - Caddopeak renamed Lurline Burns
- Palmyra 1,381–ton cargo ship built in 1880. Other names: Genoa, Naples Trieste, Patras, Corfu, and built as Gibraltar.

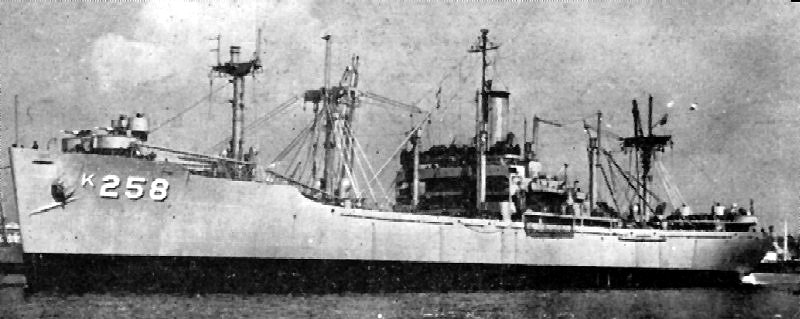
A Victory ship of World War II

Liberty ship of World War II

  - Victory Ships:
- Calvin Victory
- Roswell Victory
- Rutgers Victory

  - Liberty ships operated:
- SS Carl E. Ladd
- Queens Victory
- Horatio Allen
- John L. Stoddard

== See also ==
- World War II United States Merchant Navy
- Coast Lines
