= USS Besboro =

Cargo ship of the United States Navy

- Besboro sister ship SS Point Bonita

History

United States
- Name: Caddopeak (1918–37); Lurline Burns (1937–43); Besboro (1943–46); Lurline Burns (1946–47); Shapur
- Namesake: Besboro, an island in Norton Sound off the coast of Alaska
- Owner: USSB (1918–22); Cook (1922–23); Charles Nelson Co. (1923–37); Burns Steamship Company (1937–43); U.S. Navy (1943–46); Maritime Administration (1946–47); Waterman (1947—?)
- Builder: Albina Engine & Machine Works Portland, Oregon
- Yard number: 8
- Laid down: date unknown
- Launched: 18 October 1918
- Sponsored by: Mrs. George Rogers
- Completed: in 1918 as SS Caddopeak
- Acquired: by the Navy, 8 June 1943
- Commissioned: 22 September 1943 as USS Besboro (AG-66) at Seattle, Washington
- Decommissioned: 3 May 1946, at San Francisco, California
- Stricken: 8 October 1946
- Identification: U.S. Official No.: 217293
- Fate: Sold, 23 May 1947
- Notes: no record of ship after 1961

General characteristics
- Type: USSB Design 1049 cargo ship
- Tonnage: 2,865 GRT 4,000 DWT
- Displacement: 1,716 tons (light); 5,500 (full load) tons
- Length: 300 ft (91 m)
- Beam: 44 ft (13 m)
- Draft: 19 ft (5.8 m)
- Propulsion: triple expansion reciprocating steam engine, single screw, 1,470shp
- Speed: 9 knots (10 mph; 17 km/h)
- Troops: 340
- Complement: 68 officers and enlisted
- Armament: three single 3 in (76 mm) dual purpose gun mounts; four single 20 mm AA gun mounts

USS Besboro (AG-66) was built as Caddopeak, a United States Shipping Board (USSB) Emergency Fleet Corporation Design 1049 cargo ship built by Albina Engine & Machine Works, launched 18 October 1918. From 1922 Caddopeak served several commercial shipping companies until sold in 1937 to Burns Steamship Company and renamed Lurline Burns. On 2 February 1942 the ship was delivered to the War Shipping Administration, allocated to the United States Army and operated by Burns and Alaska Steamship Company under an Army charter agreement.

On 9 June 1943 Lurline Burns was purchased by the U.S. Navy and commissioned on 22 September 1943 as the miscellaneous auxiliary USS Besboro (AG-66) assigned to duties transporting cargo and troops between Seattle and Alaska. Besboro decommissioned on 3 May 1946 and on 1 July 1946 turned over to the Maritime Commission for disposal. After spending time in the Maritime Commission reserve fleet at Suisun Bay the ship was sold commercial and later was under Panamanian registry as Shapur.

== Service history ==
Caddopeak was built by the Albina Engine & Machine Works as a United States Shipping Board (USSB) Emergency Fleet Corporation Design 1049, a particular design also known as the Albina type, in 1918 at Portland, Oregon. In a departure from the usual practice of launching a hull at about 75% completion the ship, Albina's hull number 8, was launched 98% completed on 18 October 1918 at 4:30 p.m. sponsored by Mrs. George Rogers whose husband was the builder's superintendent. Until 1922 Caddopeak was owned by the USSB and then sold to Cook which operated the ship briefly until 1923. The ship operated under the Charles Nelson Company from 1923 to 1937. In 1937 Caddopeak was sold to the Burns Steamship Company and renamed Lurline Burns.

Lurline Burns was delivered to the War Shipping Administration on 2 February 1942 by the Burns Steamship Company and operated under a United States Army Transportation Corps agreement by Burns Steamship Company as agent until 11 June 1942 when the agent was changed to the Alaska Steamship Company. On 1 March 1943 the operating agent was again changed to the Burns Steamship Company. The ship was purchased by the Navy on 9 June 1943. The ship was commissioned at Seattle, Washington on 22 September 1943 as USS Besboro Classified a miscellaneous auxiliary and designated AG-66 under the command of Lt. Comdr. Robert M. Baughman, USNR. Besboro reported for shakedown training on 1 October and completed it two weeks later.

She got underway for Alaskan waters on the 14th and arrived in Dutch Harbor on the 23d. For almost 31 months—through the end of World War II and during the early postwar period—Besboro steamed along a resupply circuit carrying cargo and troops between Seattle, Washington, and various points on the coast of Alaska. She returned south for the last time early in 1946. After an inspection and survey at the Mare Island Naval Shipyard, the cargoman was declared surplus to the needs of the Navy. Accordingly, Besboro was decommissioned at San Francisco, California, on 3 May 1946. She was turned over to the U.S. Maritime Commission for disposal on 1 July 1946, and her name was struck from the Navy list on 8 October 1946.

On 23 May 1947, she was sold to the Waterman Steamship Corporation which firm converted her back to mercantile service and restored her former name. However, Lurline Burns did not stay long in its service. By 1948, the Hong Kong firm, Wellem & Co. operated her under Panamanian registry as SS Shapur. That company employed her until 1960 or 1961 when all reference to her in mercantile records ceased.

== Bibliography ==
- Lloyds. "Lloyd's Register 1935–36" (PDF). Lloyd's Register (through PlimsollShipData).
- Maritime Administration. "Lurline Burns". Ship History Database Vessel Status Card. U.S. Department of Transportation, Maritime Administration. Archived from the original on 30 June 2015.
- McKellar, Norman L. "Contract Steel Ships, Part IV" (PDF). Steel Shipbuilding under the U. S. Shipping Board, 1917–1921. ShipScribe.
- Naval History And Heritage Command. "Besboro". Dictionary of American Naval Fighting Ships. Naval History And Heritage Command.
- NavSource. "USS Besboro (AG-66)". NavSource.
- "Los Angeles Harbor (note on bottom right of page)". Pacific Marine Review. 15 (November). San Francisco: J.S. Hines: 127. 1918.
