= USS Lyra =

Cargo ship of the United States Navy

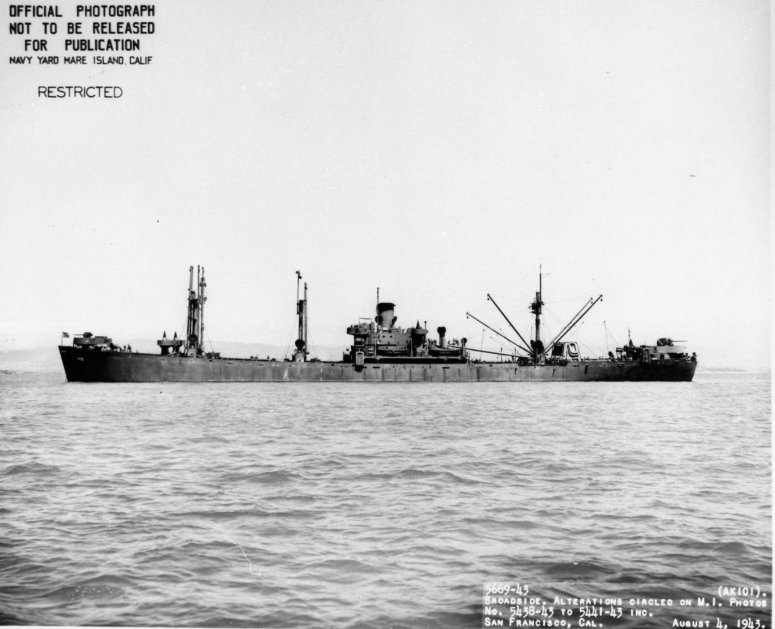
- USS Lyra (AK-101) (broadside view) at anchor in San Francisco Bay, 4 August 1943.

History

United States
- Name: Cyrus Hamlin; Lyra
- Namesake: Cyrus Hamlin; The constellation Lyra
- Ordered: as a Type EC2-S-C1 hull, MCE hull 1555
- Builder: Permanente Metals Corporation, Richmond, California
- Yard number: 1555
- Way number: 2
- Laid down: 25 April 1943
- Launched: 28 May 1943
- Sponsored by: Mrs. Harry N. Nelson
- Acquired: 10 June 1943
- Commissioned: 22 July 1943
- Decommissioned: 3 May 1946
- Identification: Hull symbol: AK-101; Hull symbol: IX-173; Code letters: NBMK
- Fate: Sold, 7 January 1947

Greece
- Name: Virginia
- Namesake: US State of Virginia
- Owner: A. G. Pappadakis, Piraeus, Greece
- Acquired: 7 January 1947
- Fate: Sold, 1951

Greece
- Name: Virginia
- Owner: Freighters & Tankers Agency Corp, New York City
- Acquired: 1951
- Fate: Sold, 1953

Greece
- Name: Virginia
- Owner: J. J. Culucundis, Piraeus and Freighters & Tankers Agency Corp, New York
- Acquired: 1953
- Fate: Sold, 1954

Greece
- Name: Virginia
- Owner: J. J. Culucundis, Piraeus and A G Pappadakis & Co Ltd, London
- Acquired: 1954
- Fate: Sold, 1964

Greece
- Name: Virginia
- Owner: Amedeo - Marfrontera Cia Nav. SA, Republic of Panama
- Acquired: 1964
- Fate: Sold to Taiwan breakers arrived Kaohsiung, 3 April 1967

General characteristics
- Class & type: Crater-class cargo ship
- Displacement: 4,023 long tons (4,088 t) (standard); 14,550 long tons (14,780 t) (full load)
- Length: 441 ft 6 in (134.57 m)
- Beam: 56 ft 11 in (17.35 m)
- Draft: 28 ft 4 in (8.64 m)
- Installed power: 2 × Babcock & Wilcox header-type boilers, 220psi 450°; 2,500 shp (1,900 kW)
- Propulsion: 1 × Joshua Hendy vertical triple-expansion reciprocating steam engine; 1 × shaft
- Speed: 12.5 kn (23.2 km/h; 14.4 mph)
- Capacity: 7,800 t (7,700 long tons) DWT; 444,206 cu ft (12,578.5 m^{3}) (non-refrigerated)
- Complement: 255
- Armament: 1 × 5 in (127 mm)/38 caliber dual-purpose (DP) gun; 1 × 3 in (76 mm)/50 caliber DP gun; 2 × 40 mm (1.57 in) Bofors anti-aircraft (AA) gun mounts; 6 × 20 mm (0.79 in) Oerlikon cannon AA gun mounts

USS Lyra (AK-101) was a Crater-class cargo ship in the service of the US Navy in World War II. It was the only ship of the Navy to have borne this name. It is named after the constellation Lyra.

== Construction ==
Lyra was laid down 25 April 1943 as Liberty ship SS Cyrus Hamlin, MCE hull 1555, by Permanente Metals Corporation, Yard No. 1, Richmond, California, under a Maritime Commission (MARCOM) contract; renamed Lyra 27 May 1943; launched 28 May 1943; sponsored by Mrs. Harry N. Nelson; acquired by the Navy 10 June 1943; converted by General Engineering & Drydock Co., San Francisco, California, completed 22 July 1943; and commissioned 22 July 1943.

== Service history ==
Lyra departed San Francisco 28 August 1943, with 8,000 tons of lend-lease cargo for New Zealand. En route she towed one unit of a sectional dock to Espiritu Santo, New Hebrides, and arrived Wellington, New Zealand, 19 October. The cargo ship returned to San Francisco 24 November. On 17 December she began a three-day experimental run to help perfect towing techniques.

Two days after Christmas, she again departed for Espiritu Santo towing Auxiliary Repair Dry Dock ARD-12. The ship then proceeded to Tulagi and Munda, Solomon Islands, embarking 200 troops from the latter for transport to Guadalcanal, which she reached 29 February 1944. Lyra returned to Tulagi and Guadalcanal, and was back in San Francisco 2 April after steaming 13,567 miles (21,834 km). From 29 April to 30 June, she made two short voyages between the west coast and Pearl Harbor.

The cargo ship's next assignment was a towing operation to Manus, Admiralty Islands, between 21 August and 15 January 1945. On 26 February she voyaged to Samar, Philippine Islands, and returned to home port 1 June. Her seventh voyage, 17 June to 24 August, took her to Honolulu and Saipan. She sailed from San Francisco 26 September to Samar for her last assignment before decommissioning in Norfolk 3 May 1946. Lyra was redelivered to War Shipping Administration (WSA) 5 days later. She was sold 7 January 1947, to A. G. Pappadakis and operated out of Piraeus, Greece, as Virginia.

== Bibliography ==
Online resources

- "Lyra". Dictionary of American Naval Fighting Ships. Naval History and Heritage Command. 29 July 2015. This article incorporates text from this source, which is in the public domain.
- "Kaiser Permanente No. 1, Richmond CA". www.ShipbuildingHistory.com. 13 October 2010.
- "USS Lyra (AK-101)". NavSource. 13 June 2014.
- "CYRUS HAMLIN (AK-101)". United States Department of Transportation. Archived from the original on December 12, 2019.
