= SS Carl E. Ladd =

World War II Liberty ship of the United States

History

United States
- Name: Carl E. Ladd
- Namesake: Carl E. Ladd
- Owner: War Shipping Administration (WSA)
- Operator: States Marine Corporation
- Ordered: as type (EC2-S-C1) hull, MC hull 2312
- Builder: J.A. Jones Construction, Panama City, Florida
- Cost: $1,054,625
- Yard number: 53
- Way number: 5
- Laid down: 19 June 1944
- Launched: 26 July 1944
- Sponsored by: Mrs. Carl E. Ladd
- Completed: 11 August 1944
- Identification: Call sign: WSIT
- Fate: Scrapped, 1967

General characteristics
- Class & type: Liberty ship; type EC2-S-C1, standard
- Tonnage: 10,865 LT DWT; 7,176 GRT
- Displacement: 3,380 long tons (3,434 t) (light); 14,245 long tons (14,474 t) (max)
- Length: 441 feet 6 inches (135 m) oa; 416 feet (127 m) pp; 427 feet (130 m) lwl
- Beam: 57 feet (17 m)
- Draft: 27 ft 9.25 in (8.4646 m)
- Installed power: 2 × Oil fired 450 °F (232 °C) boilers, operating at 220 psi (1,500 kPa); 2,500 hp (1,900 kW)
- Propulsion: 1 × triple-expansion steam engine, (manufactured by Willamette Iron & Steel Corp., Portland, Oregon); 1 × screw propeller
- Speed: 11.5 knots (21.3 km/h; 13.2 mph)
- Capacity: 562,608 cubic feet (15,931 m^{3}) (grain); 499,573 cubic feet (14,146 m^{3}) (bale)
- Complement: 38–62 USMM; 21–40 USNAG
- Armament: Varied by ship; Bow-mounted 3-inch (76 mm)/50-caliber gun; Stern-mounted 4-inch (102 mm)/50-caliber gun; 2–8 × single 20-millimeter (0.79 in) Oerlikon anti-aircraft (AA) cannons and/or, 2–8 × 37-millimeter (1.46 in) M1 AA guns

SS Carl E. Ladd was a Liberty ship built in the United States during World War II. She was named after Carl E. Ladd, a researcher and professor in the field of agriculture, and a university administrator. Ladd was the Director of Extension of the New York State College of Agriculture at Cornell, and the dean of the colleges of agriculture and home economics at Cornell from 1932 to 1943.

== Construction ==
Carl E. Ladd was laid down on 19 June 1944, under a Maritime Commission (MARCOM) contract, MC hull 2312, by J.A. Jones Construction, Panama City, Florida; she was sponsored by Mrs. Carl E. Ladd, the widow of the namesake, and launched on 26 July 1944.

== History ==
She was allocated to States Marine Corporation, 11 August 1944, transferred to the Burns Steamship Company, 10 March 1945, and the American Haw. Steamship Co., 27 February 1947. On 5 October 1948, she was laid up in the National Defense Reserve Fleet, in Astoria, Oregon.

On 7 June 1954, she was withdrawn from the fleet to be loaded with grain as part of the "Grain Program 1954". She returned to the fleet on 23 June 1954, full of grain. On 7 October 1957, she was withdrawn to unload, she returned empty on 12 October 1957. On 6 July 1967, she was sold, for $51,700 to Universal Salvage and Construction Co., to be scrapped. She was withdrawn from the fleet on 30 September 1967.

== Bibliography ==
- "Jones Construction, Panama City FL". www.ShipbuildingHistory.com. 13 October 2010.
- Maritime Administration. "Carl E. Ladd". Ship History Database Vessel Status Card. U.S. Department of Transportation, Maritime Administration. This article incorporates text from this source, which is in the public domain.
- Davies, James (May 2004). "Specifications (As-Built)" (PDF). p. 23.
- "SS Carl E. Ladd".
