= Utsumi =

Utsumi (written: 内海) is a Japanese surname. Notable people with the surname include:

- Chieko Utsumi (born 1903), Japanese physical educator
- Kenji Utsumi (内海 賢二, 1937–2013), Japanese voice actor
- Utsumi Tadakatsu (内海 忠勝, 1843–1905), Japanese politician and cabinet minister
- Takeshi Utsumi, American operations researcher
- Tomohide Utsumi (内海 知秀, born 1958), Japanese basketball coach
- Yoshio Utsumi (内海 善雄, born 1942), former secretary general of International Telecommunication Union
- Hideaki Utsumi (内海 秀明), former Capcom sound designer

== Fictional characters ==
- Shō Utsumi (内海 将), a character in the anime series SSSS.Gridman
- Yukie Utsumi (内海 幸枝), a character in the novel Battle Royale
