= USS Coasters Harbor =

Cargo ship of the United States Navy

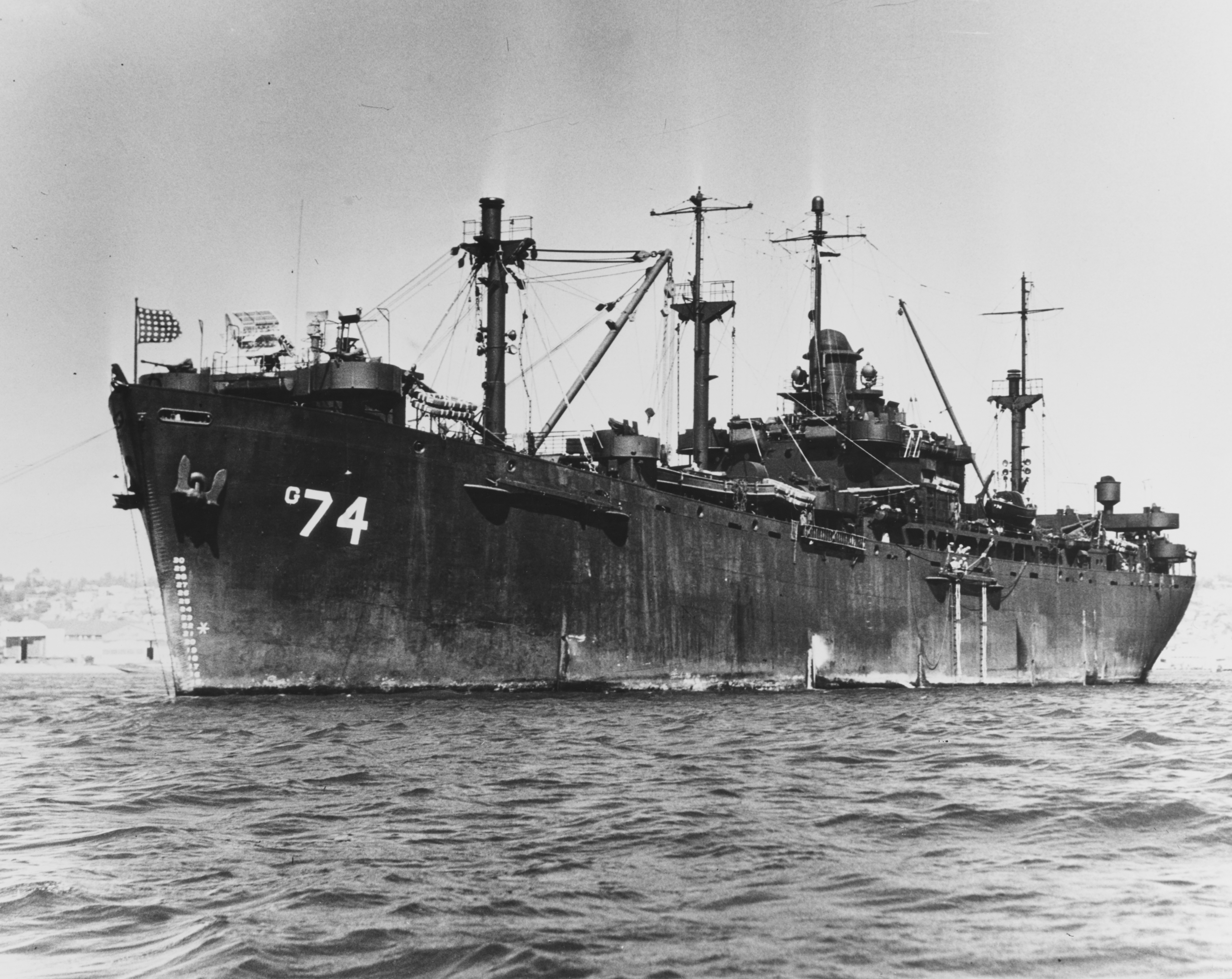

History

United States
- Name: Coasters Harbor
- Namesake: An island in Narragansett Bay, Rhode Island
- Builder: New England Shipbuilding Corporation, South Portland, Maine
- Laid down: 4 October 1944 as type (EC2-S-C1) hull, (MCE 3073)
- Launched: 17 November 1944
- Sponsored by: Mrs. M. M. Naples
- Acquired: by the Navy 26 November 1944
- Commissioned: 29 July 1945 as USS Coasters Harbor (AG-74)
- Decommissioned: 3 July 1947, at San Diego, California
- In service: 26 November 1944
- Out of service: 30 November 1944
- Reclassified: AKS-22, 18 August 1951
- Refit: Todd Shipbuilding Company, Brooklyn, New York
- Stricken: 1 April 1960
- Fate: sold for scrapping, 5 December 1960

General characteristics
- Type: Basilan-class miscellaneous auxiliary
- Displacement: 5,766 tons light; 14,350 tons full load
- Length: 441 ft 6 in (134.57 m)
- Beam: 66 ft 11 in (20.40 m)
- Draft: 23 ft (7.0 m)
- Propulsion: reciprocating steam engine, single shaft, 1,950hp.
- Speed: 12 knots
- Complement: 891 officers and enlisted
- Armament: one single 3 in (76 mm) dual purpose gun mount; four single 40 mm AA gun mounts

USS Coasters Harbor (AG-74) was a Basilan-class miscellaneous auxiliary acquired by the U.S. Navy during World War II. She was configured as a repair ship and sent to the Pacific Ocean just as the war ended. She was retained to participate in atomic testing at Bikini Atoll.

== Constructed in Portland, Maine ==
Coasters Harbor was launched 17 November 1944 by New England Shipbuilding Corporation, South Portland, Maine, under a U.S. Maritime Commission contract; sponsored by Mrs. M. M. Naples; transferred to the Navy 26 November 1944; commissioned the same day, ferried to Todd Shipbuilding Company, Brooklyn, New York; decommissioned 30 November 1944 for conversion to an electronics repair ship; and was recommissioned 29 July 1945.

== World War II-related service ==
Sailing from Norfolk, Virginia, 29 August, Coasters Harbor reached San Diego, California, 19 September and Sasebo, Japan, 31 October. She remained there servicing vessels of the occupation force until 5 March 1946.

== Atomic testing at Bikini Atoll ==
Coasters Harbor sailed westward to take part in Operation Crossroads. Following the atomic weapons tests Coasters Harbor returned to the U.S. West Coast, arriving at San Pedro, California, 14 September.

== Post-war decommissioning ==
She was placed out of commission in reserve at San Diego, California, 3 July 1947. She was redesignated AKS-22, 18 August 1951 and stricken from the Navy List on 1 April 1960.
