= USS Cuttyhunk Island =

Auxiliary ship

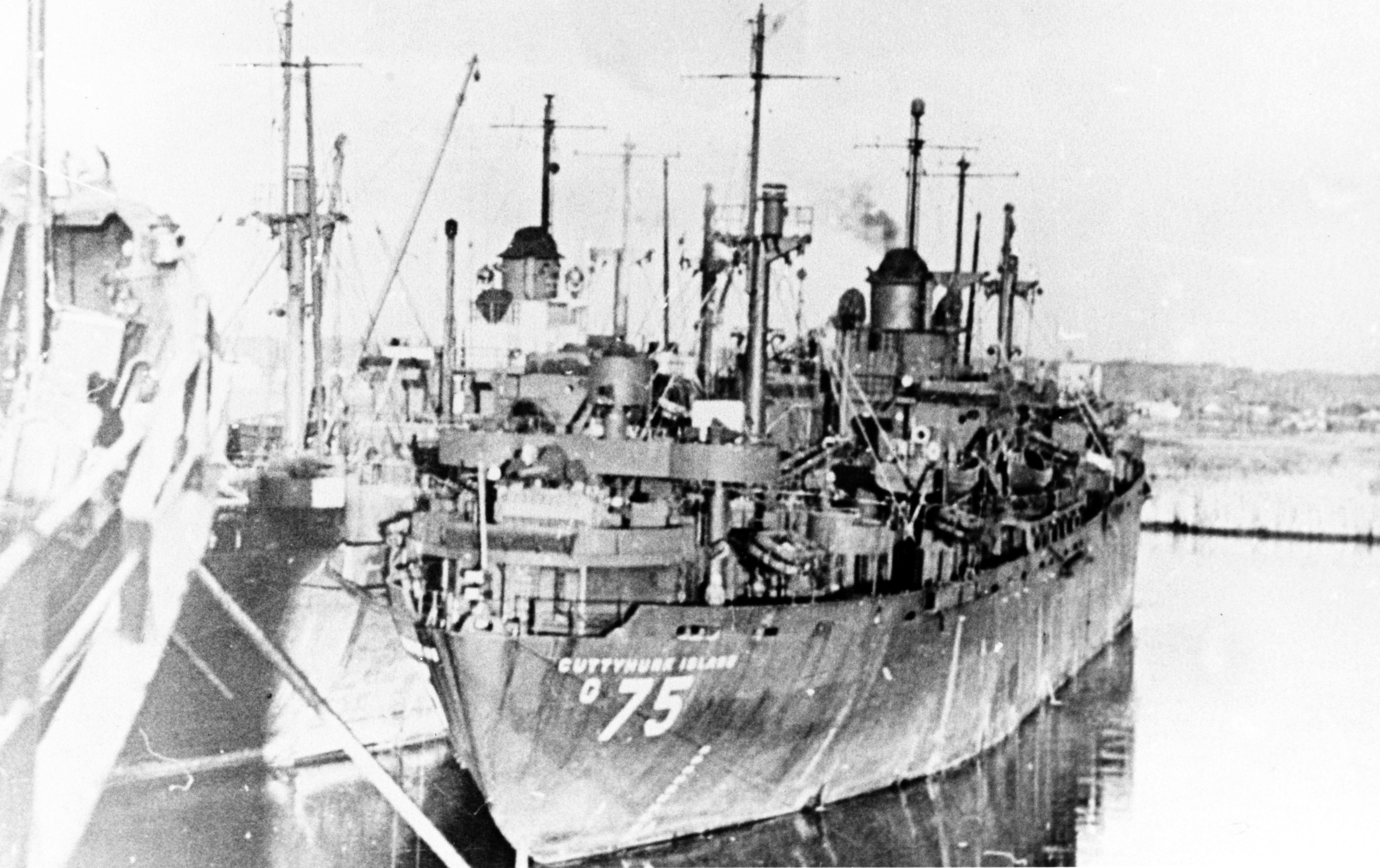
- Cuttyhunk Island, circa in 1946

History

United States
- Name: Cuttyhunk Island
- Namesake: Cuttyhunk Island
- Builder: New England Shipbuilding Corporation, South Portland, Maine
- Laid down: 16 October 1944 as type (EC2-S-C1) hull, (MCE hull 3088)
- Launched: 26 November 1944
- Sponsored by: Mrs. M. M. Dayo
- Acquired: by the Navy, 7 December 1944
- Commissioned: 1 September 1945 as USS Cuttyhunk Island (AG-75)
- Decommissioned: 3 May 1946, at Orange, Texas
- Reclassified: AKS-23, 18 August 1951
- Refit: Eureka Shipbuilding Corporation, Newburg, New York
- Stricken: date unknown
- Fate: scrapped 1960

General characteristics
- Type: Belle Isle-class miscellaneous auxiliary
- Displacement: 5,371 tons light; 14,350 tons full load
- Length: 442 ft (135 m)
- Beam: 57 ft (17 m)
- Draft: 23 ft (7.0 m)
- Propulsion: reciprocating steam engine, single shaft, 1,950hp
- Speed: 11.5 knots
- Complement: 891 officers and enlisted
- Armament: four 40 mm single gun mounts

USS Cuttyhunk Island (AG-75/AKS-23) was a Belle Isle-class miscellaneous auxiliary acquired by the U.S. Navy during World War II. Cuttyhunk Island was built as the war was coming to an end, and was used as a transport. She was later classified as a stores ship and eventually scrapped.

== Constructed at Portland, Maine ==
Cuttyhunk Island (AG-75) was launched 26 November 1944 by New England Shipbuilding Corporation, South Portland, Maine, under a U.S. Maritime Commission contract; sponsored by Mrs. M. M. Dayo.

== World War II-related service ==
Cuttyhunk Island was acquired by the Navy 7 December 1944; outfitted at Eureka Shipbuilding Corp., Newburg, New York; and commissioned 1 September 1945.

Cuttyhunk Island departed Norfolk, Virginia, 24 November 1945 to carry troops from Bermuda to Boston, Massachusetts.

== Post-war decommissioning ==
She reported to Orange, Texas, 31 January 1946, and there was placed out of commission in reserve 3 May 1946. She was reclassified General Stores Issue Ship AKS-23, 18 August 1951.
