= SS Clifford D. Mallory =

Liberty ship of WWII

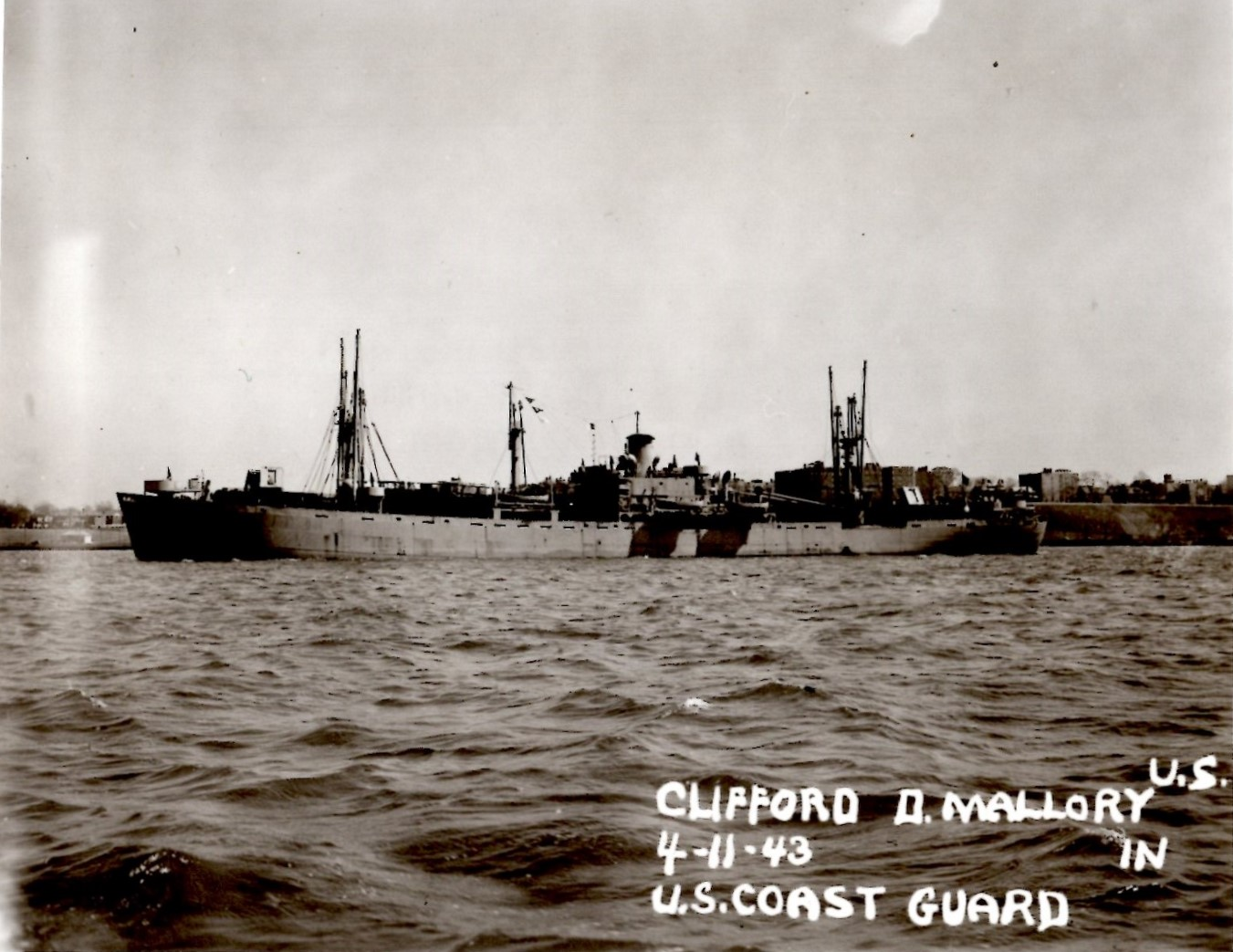
- Liberty Ship SS Clifford D. Mallory, 11 April 1943

History

United States
- Name: Clifford D. Mallory
- Namesake: Clifford D. Mallory
- Owner: War Shipping Administration (WSA)
- Operator: Marine Transport Lines, Inc.
- Ordered: as type (EC2-S-C1) hull, MCE hull 952
- Awarded: 30 January 1942
- Builder: Bethlehem-Fairfield Shipyard, Baltimore, Maryland
- Cost: $1,063,757
- Yard number: 2102
- Way number: 6
- Laid down: 30 January 1943
- Launched: 11 March 1943
- Completed: 26 March 1943
- Identification: Call sign: KKNI
- Fate: Laid up in reserve fleet, 1 June 1948, converted for USN use, 1 June 1955

United States
- Name: Clifford D. Mallory
- Builder: Mississippi Shipping Co., Mobile, Alabama
- Reclassified: Hull symbol: YAG-49; type EC2-S-22a
- Fate: Returned to reserve fleet, 17 January 1956, sold for scrapping, 28 October 1971
- Notes: USN never acquired the converted ship

General characteristics
- Class & type: Liberty ship; type EC2-S-C1, standard
- Tonnage: 10,865 LT DWT; 7,176 GRT
- Displacement: 3,380 long tons (3,434 t) (light); 14,245 long tons (14,474 t) (max)
- Length: 441 feet 6 inches (135 m) oa; 416 feet (127 m) pp; 427 feet (130 m) lwl
- Beam: 57 feet (17 m)
- Draft: 27 ft 9.25 in (8.4646 m)
- Installed power: 2 × Oil fired 450 °F (232 °C) boilers, operating at 220 psi (1,500 kPa); 2,500 hp (1,900 kW)
- Propulsion: 1 × triple-expansion steam engine, (manufactured by General Machinery Corp., Hamilton, Ohio); 1 × screw propeller
- Speed: 11.5 knots (21.3 km/h; 13.2 mph)
- Capacity: 562,608 cubic feet (15,931 m^{3}) (grain); 499,573 cubic feet (14,146 m^{3}) (bale)
- Complement: 38–62 USMM; 21–40 USNAG
- Armament: Varied by ship; Bow-mounted 3-inch (76 mm)/50-caliber gun; Stern-mounted 4-inch (102 mm)/50-caliber gun; 2–8 × single 20-millimeter (0.79 in) Oerlikon anti-aircraft (AA) cannons and/or, 2–8 × 37-millimeter (1.46 in) M1 AA guns

SS Clifford D. Mallory was a Liberty ship built in the United States during World War II. She was named after Clifford D. Mallory, a vice president of the Mallory and Clyde Lines, a Shipping Board Emergency Fleet Corporation officer, and founder of C.D. Mallory & Co.

== Construction ==
Clifford D. Mallory was laid down on 30 January 1943, under a Maritime Commission (MARCOM) contract, MCE hull 952, by the Bethlehem-Fairfield Shipyard, Baltimore, Maryland; she was launched on 11 March 1943.

== History ==
She was allocated to the Marine Transport Lines, Inc., on 26 March 1943.

On 1 June 1948, she was first laid up in the Defense Reserve Fleet, in Mobile, Alabama.

=== Conversion to minesweeper ===
On 1 June 1955, she was withdrawn from the reserve fleet and transported to the Mississippi Shipping Co., in Mobile, for conversion to a minesweeper. The conversion included installing equipment for remote control propulsion, adding a 1,000 U.S. gal/min (0.063 m^{3}/s) ballasting pump, and changing buoyant material in all five holds. She had been assigned the new classification of YAG, Auxiliary Service Craft, Miscellaneous, and the hull number 49, but after conversion she was not acquired by the USN and was placed back into the Reserve Fleet, in Mobile, 17 January 1956.

== Fate ==
On 28 October 1971, she was sold, along with 13 other ships, for $513,800, to Union Minerals & Alloys Corp., for scrapping. She was withdrawn from the fleet on 16 December 1971.

== Bibliography ==
- "Bethlehem-Fairfield, Baltimore MD". www.ShipbuildingHistory.com. 7 August 2021.
- Maritime Administration. "Clifford D. Mallory". Ship History Database Vessel Status Card. U.S. Department of Transportation, Maritime Administration.
- Davies, James (May 2004). "Specifications (As-Built)" (PDF). p. 23.
- "SS Clifford D. Mallory".
- Sawyer, L.A.; Mitchell, W.H. (1985). The Liberty Ships. Bury St. Edmunds, Suffolk, Great Britain: St. Edmundsbury Press Ltd. ISBN 1850440492.
