= SS Cotton Mather =

Liberty ship of WWII

History

United States
- Name: Cotton Mather
- Namesake: Cotton Mather
- Owner: War Shipping Administration (WSA)
- Operator: American Export Lines, Inc.
- Ordered: as type (EC2-S-C1) hull, MCE hull 922
- Awarded: 1 January 1942
- Builder: Bethlehem-Fairfield Shipyard, Baltimore, Maryland
- Cost: $1,060,049
- Yard number: 2072
- Way number: 16
- Laid down: 28 September 1942
- Launched: 31 October 1942
- Sponsored by: Mrs. R.M. Meyers
- Completed: 30 November 1942
- Identification: Call sign: KHPW
- Fate: Sold for scrapping, 24 November 1959

General characteristics
- Class & type: Liberty ship; type EC2-S-C1, standard
- Tonnage: 10,865 LT DWT; 7,176 GRT
- Displacement: 3,380 long tons (3,434 t) (light); 14,245 long tons (14,474 t) (max)
- Length: 441 feet 6 inches (135 m) oa; 416 feet (127 m) pp; 427 feet (130 m) lwl
- Beam: 57 feet (17 m)
- Draft: 27 ft 9.25 in (8.4646 m)
- Installed power: 2 × Oil fired 450 °F (232 °C) boilers, operating at 220 psi (1,500 kPa); 2,500 hp (1,900 kW)
- Propulsion: 1 × triple-expansion steam engine, (manufactured by Vulcan Iron Works, Wilkes-Barre, Pennsylvania); 1 × screw propeller
- Speed: 11.5 knots (21.3 km/h; 13.2 mph)
- Capacity: 562,608 cubic feet (15,931 m^{3}) (grain); 499,573 cubic feet (14,146 m^{3}) (bale)
- Complement: 38–62 USMM; 21–40 USNAG
- Armament: Varied by ship; Bow-mounted 3-inch (76 mm)/50-caliber gun; Stern-mounted 4-inch (102 mm)/50-caliber gun; 2–8 × single 20-millimeter (0.79 in) Oerlikon anti-aircraft (AA) cannons and/or, 2–8 × 37-millimeter (1.46 in) M1 AA guns

SS Cotton Mather was a Liberty ship built in the United States during World War II. She was named after Cotton Mather, a New England Puritan minister, prolific author, and pamphleteer.

== Construction ==
Cotton Mather was laid down on 28 September 1942, under a Maritime Commission (MARCOM) contract, MCE hull 922, by the Bethlehem-Fairfield Shipyard, Baltimore, Maryland; she was sponsored by Mrs .R.M. Meyers, the wife of a yard employee, and was launched on 31 October 1942.

== History ==
She was allocated to American Export Lines Inc., on 30 November 1942. On 22 May 1950, she was laid up in the National Defense Reserve Fleet, Wilmington, North Carolina. On 24 November 1959, she was sold for scrapping to Walsh Construction Co., for $71,825. She was removed from the fleet on 9 February 1960.

== Bibliography ==
- "Bethlehem-Fairfield, Baltimore MD". www.ShipbuildingHistory.com. 14 August 2008.
- Maritime Administration. "Cotton Mather". Ship History Database Vessel Status Card. U.S. Department of Transportation, Maritime Administration.
- Davies, James (May 2004). "Specifications (As-Built)" (PDF). p. 23.
- "SS Cotton Mather".
