= Potosi =

Potosí or Potosi may refer to the following topics, whose names generally originate from the name of Potosí, a city in modern-day Bolivia that was the center of world silver production during the reign of the Spanish Empire:

== Places ==
=== United States ===
- Potosi, Missouri, in Washington County
- Potosi, Nevada, a ghost town in Clark County, Nevada
- Potosi, Texas, in Taylor County
- Potosi (town), Wisconsin, in Grant County
  - Potosi, Wisconsin, a village within the Town of Potosi

=== Elsewhere ===
- Potosí, the capital of Potosí Department, Bolivia, a silver mining center and UNESCO World Heritage Site
- Potosí Department, a department in southwestern Bolivia
- Potosí, Nicaragua, a town in Rivas Department
- Potosi, Venezuela, a disestablished town in Táchira
- San Luis Potosí City, capital and most populous city of San Luis Potosí, Mexico

== Mountains ==
- Potosi Mountain (Nevada), U.S.
- Potosí mountain range or Cordillera de Potosí, to the southeast of the city of Potosí, Bolivia
- Potosi Peak, in the Sneffels Range, Colorado, US
- Cerro de Potosí, a mountain near the city of Potosí, Bolivia, also known as Cerro Rico; a Spanish colonial mining site
- Cerro Potosí, a mountain in Nuevo León, Mexico
- Huayna Potosí, a mountain in the La Paz Department, Bolivia
- Wayna Potosí (Oruro), a mountain in the Oruro Department, Bolivia

== Other uses ==
- Potosi (barque), an 1895 German sailing ship named after the Bolivian city
- Potosi Correctional Center, a prison near Potosi, Missouri
- Potosi Mining District, in Clark County, Nevada
- Potosi, Trelawny, Jamaica, a former sugar plantation
- Potosi Pinyon (Pinus culminicola), a species of pine tree native to northeast Mexico
- Potosi pupfish (Cyprinodon alvarezi), a species of fish once endemic to Mexico, but now extinct in the wild

== See also ==
- Potosi Mine (disambiguation)
- Potosi Mountain (disambiguation)
