= Ñuñu Qullu (Sajama) =

Mountain in Bolivia

- Location within Bolivia

Highest point
- Elevation: 4,723 m (15,495 ft)
- Coordinates: 18°09′37″S 68°25′28″W

Geography
- Location: Bolivia, Oruro Department, Sajama Province
- Parent range: Andes

Ñuñu Qullu (Aymara ñuñu breast, qullu mountain, "breast mountain", also spelled Nunu Kkollu) is a 4,723-metre-high (15,495 ft) mountain in the Andes of Bolivia. It is situated in the Oruro Department, Sajama Province, in the north of the Turco Municipality. Ñuñu Qullu lies south-west of the mountain Yaritani, north-east of the volcanic complex of Asu Asuni and south-east of the mountains Chunkarani, Milluni and Pukarani.
