= Potosi Mountain =

Potosi Mountain may refer to:

- Cerro Rico ("Rich Mountain") in Bolivia, also known as Potosi Mountain
- A mountain of the Potosí mountain range in Bolivia
- Huayna Potosí, Bolivia
- Potosi Mountain (Nevada)
- Wayna Potosí (Oruro), Bolivia

== See also ==
- Potosi (disambiguation)
