= Chaidamuite =

Sulfate mineral

General
- Category: Sulfate minerals
- Formula: ZnFe^{3+}(SO_{4})_{2}(OH)·4(H_{2}O)
- IMA symbol: Cdm
- Strunz classification: 7.DC.30
- Crystal system: Triclinic
- Crystal class: Pedial (1) (same H-M symbol)
- Space group: P1
- Unit cell: a = 7.309(2) Å, b = 7.202(2) Å, c = 9.691(3) Å; α = 89.64(3)°, β = 105.89(1)°, γ = 91.11(1)°; Z = 2

Identification
- Color: Brown to yellow-brown
- Crystal habit: Tabular pseudocubic crystals and granular masses; pseudomonoclinic
- Cleavage: On {001} and {100}, perfect.
- Fracture: conchoidal
- Mohs scale hardness: 2.5–3
- Luster: Vitreous
- Streak: Pale yellow
- Diaphaneity: Translucent
- Optical properties: Biaxial (+)
- Refractive index: n_{α} = 1.632 n_{β} = 1.640 n_{γ} = 1.688
- Birefringence: δ = 0.056
- Pleochroism: Strong: X= pale yellow, colorless; Y= pale yellow; z= Brownish yellow
- 2V angle: 44°

Chaidamuite is a rare zinc – iron sulfate mineral with chemical formula: ZnFe^{3+}(SO_{4})_{2}(OH)·4H_{2}O.

It was first described for an occurrence in the Xitieshan mine south of Mt. Qilianshan in the Chaidamu basin, Qinghai Province, China and was named for the locality. It occurs as an oxidation phase in a lead zinc deposit. In the type locality it is associated with the rare minerals: coquimbite, copiapite, butlerite and zincobotryogen. In addition to the Chinese occurrence, it has been reported from the Getchell Mine in the Potosi District in Humboldt County, Nevada.

== Bibliography ==
- Clark, A.M. (1993) Hey's Mineral Index (3rd edition). Alphabetical Index of Mineral Species, Varieties and Synonyms and Chemical Classification. 121 p. Chapman & Hall, New York, NY.
- Jambor, J.L., and Burke, E.A.J. (1990) New Mineral Names. American Mineralogist, 75, 1431–1437.
- Li, W., Chen, G., and Peng, Z. (1986) Chaidamuite. Acta Mineralogica Sinica, 6, 109.
- Li, W.M., and Wang, Q.G. (1990) Determination and Refinement of the Crystal Structure of Chaidamuite (Issue 5). Science in China Series B-Chemistry, 33, 623–630
- Mandarino, J.A., and de Fourestier, J., (2005) Mineral Species First Found in People's Republic of China. (No. 2). Rocks and Minerals, 80, 114–117.
