= Pukarani (Bolivia) =

Mountain in Bolivia

- Location within Bolivia

Highest point
- Coordinates: 18°08′29″S 68°26′13″W

Geography
- Location: Bolivia, Oruro Department, Sajama Province
- Parent range: Andes

Pukarani (Aymara pukara fortress, -ni a suffix to indicate ownership, "the one with a fortress", Hispanicized spelling Pocarani) is mountain in the Andes of Bolivia. It lies in the Oruro Department, Sajama Province, in the north of the Turco Municipality. Pukarani is situated northeast of the volcanic complex of Asu Asuni and Milluni and east of Chunkarani.
