= Potosi Mine =

Potosi Mine may refer to:

- Cerro Rico, near Potosí, Bolivia, famous for providing vast quantities of silver for Spain during the period of the New World Spanish Empire
- Potosi Mining District in southern Nevada, U.S., named after Potosí, Bolivia
- San Luis Potosí, a Mexican state, well known for its gold and silver mines, also named after Potosí, Bolivia

== See also ==
- Potosi (disambiguation)
