= Wichhu Qullu (Sajama) =

Mountain in Bolivia

- Location within Bolivia

Highest point
- Elevation: 4,040 m (13,250 ft)
- Coordinates: 18°15′44″S 68°48′04″W

Geography
- Location: Bolivia; Oruro Department, Sajama Province, Turco Municipality
- Parent range: Andes, Cordillera Occidental

Wichhu Qullu (Aymara jichu, wichhu stipa ichu, qullu mountain, "ichu mountain", also named Wichukkollu Loma (Spanish loma hill) is a mountain in a volcanic field in the Cordillera Occidental of Bolivia northeast of the summit of the Chullkani volcano. It is located in the Oruro Department, Sajama Province, Turco Municipality, between Jach'a K'uchu in the northeast and Liyun Ikiña in the southwest. The peak of Wichhu Qullu reaches a height of approximately 4,040 m (13,255 ft).

The Wichhu Qullu lavas, named after the mountain, are lava flows whose outcrops are best visible in the Qhuyani (Khoyani), Liyun Ikiña and Wichhu Qullu valleys.
