= Jach'a K'uchu (Bolivia) =

Mountain in Bolivia

- Location within Bolivia

Highest point
- Elevation: 4,508 m (14,790 ft)
- Coordinates: 18°15′07″S 68°46′39″W

Geography
- Location: Bolivia; Oruro Department, Sajama Province, Turco Municipality
- Parent range: Andes, Cordillera Occidental

Jach'a K'uchu (Aymara jach'a big, k'uchu corner, "big corner", also named Jachcha Khuchu, Jachcha Kuchu) is a 4,508-metre-high (14,790 ft) mountain in a volcanic field in the Cordillera Occidental of Bolivia northeast of the Chullkani volcano. It is located in the Oruro Department, Sajama Province, Turco Municipality. Jach'a K'uchu is one of five mountains which belong to the so-called Jitiri Dome.
