= Chullcani =

Volcano in the Andes of Bolivia

Chullkani
- Location within Bolivia

Highest point
- Elevation: 5,032 m (16,509 ft)
- Coordinates: 18°18′39″S 68°50′24″W

Geography
- Location: Bolivia; Oruro Department
- Parent range: Andes, Cordillera Occidental

Geology
- Rock age: Miocene
- Last eruption: Upper Pliocene

Chullkani (possibly a broken name from Aymara Chullunkhäni ("the one with the icicles"), Hispanicized spelling Chullcani) is a 5,032-metre-high (16,509 ft) volcano in the Cordillera Occidental in the Andes of Bolivia. It is located in the Oruro Department, Sajama Province, Turco Municipality. It lies near two lower peaks both named Wayna Chullunkhäni ("young Chullunkhäni"). The eastern one called Wayna Chullunkhäni (Hispanicized Huayna Chulluncani) lies at 18°18′30″S 68°48′27″W, and the one northwest of Chullkani, also spelled Huayna Chuluncani, lies at 18°14′57″S 68°51′22″W at a creek named Wayna Chullkani (Huayna Chullcani).

Activity at Chullkani commenced in the upper Miocene with the cryptodome Ch'ankha Muqu. This lava dome is formed by porphyritic andesite and has dimensions of 100 by 500 metres (330 ft × 1,640 ft) at an altitude of 4,110 metres (13,480 ft). Later, southeast of Chullkani formed the rhyolitic Yapu Qullu lava dome. Crystalline flows named Thuwas Qalani (Tobas Khalani) are up to 50 metres (160 ft) thick and contain lithic fragments and pumice. Chullkani proper formed 6.13± 0.12 Ma from andesites. Another group of five peaks stretching northeast are lava domes and named Jitiri, Picha Qullu (Picha Kkollu), Llallawi (Llalahui) (or Llallani), Jach'a K'uchu and Wila Lat'arata. A dacite lava dome named Liyun Ikiña was erupted 6.2±0.4 Ma.

During the Pliocene, fissure eruptions formed the trachytic Pérez Formation which crops out north of Chullkani. In the Wanq'u Jaqhi gorge (Huancoaki), these deposits crop out 50–55 metres (164–180 ft). Andesitic lavas erupted 2.3±0.2 Ma are named Wichhu Qullu lavas. Another effusive activity generated the Carbón Qullu lavas (Carbon Kollu) and finally the Pukara lava dome, whose collapse generated the Thuwas Ventilla pyroclastic flow.
