= Kunturiri (Sajama) =

Mountain in Bolivia

- Location within Bolivia

Highest point
- Elevation: 4,512 m (14,803 ft)
- Coordinates: 18°2′54″S 68°9′21″W

Geography
- Location: Bolivia, Oruro Department
- Parent range: Andes

Kunturiri (Aymara kunturi condor, -ri nominal suffix, hispanicized spelling Condoriri) is a mountain in the Andes of Bolivia, about 4,512 metres (14,803 ft) high. It is situated in the Oruro Department, Sajama Province, Turku Municipality, Turku Canton, northeast of Turku (Turco). The rivers Kunturiri and Phurqi Q'awa (Porkhekhaua) originate near the mountain. They flow down to Turku River, a left tributary of Lauca River.

== See also ==
- Asu Asuni
- Sajama
- Sajama National Park
- Wayna Potosí
- List of mountains in the Andes
