= Kusin Ch'utu =

Mountain in Bolivia

- Location within Bolivia

Highest point
- Elevation: 5,020 m (16,470 ft)
- Coordinates: 18°06′50″S 68°19′07″W

Geography
- Location: Bolivia, Oruro Department, Sajama Province
- Parent range: Andes

Kusin Ch'utu (Aymara kusi happiness, fortune, good luck, -n(i) a suffix to indicate ownership, ch'utu peak of a mountain, top of the head, Hispanicized spelling Cusin Chuto) is a 5,020-metre-high (16,470 ft) mountain in the Andes of Bolivia. It is located in the Oruro Department, Sajama Province, in the north of the Turco Municipality. Kusin Ch'utu is situated north-east of the mountains Qhapaqa, Yaritani and Kimsa Chata. The river Q'ulini ("the one with stripes", Culini) originates at the mountain. It flows to the south-east.
