= Carole Lombard =

American actress (1908–1942)

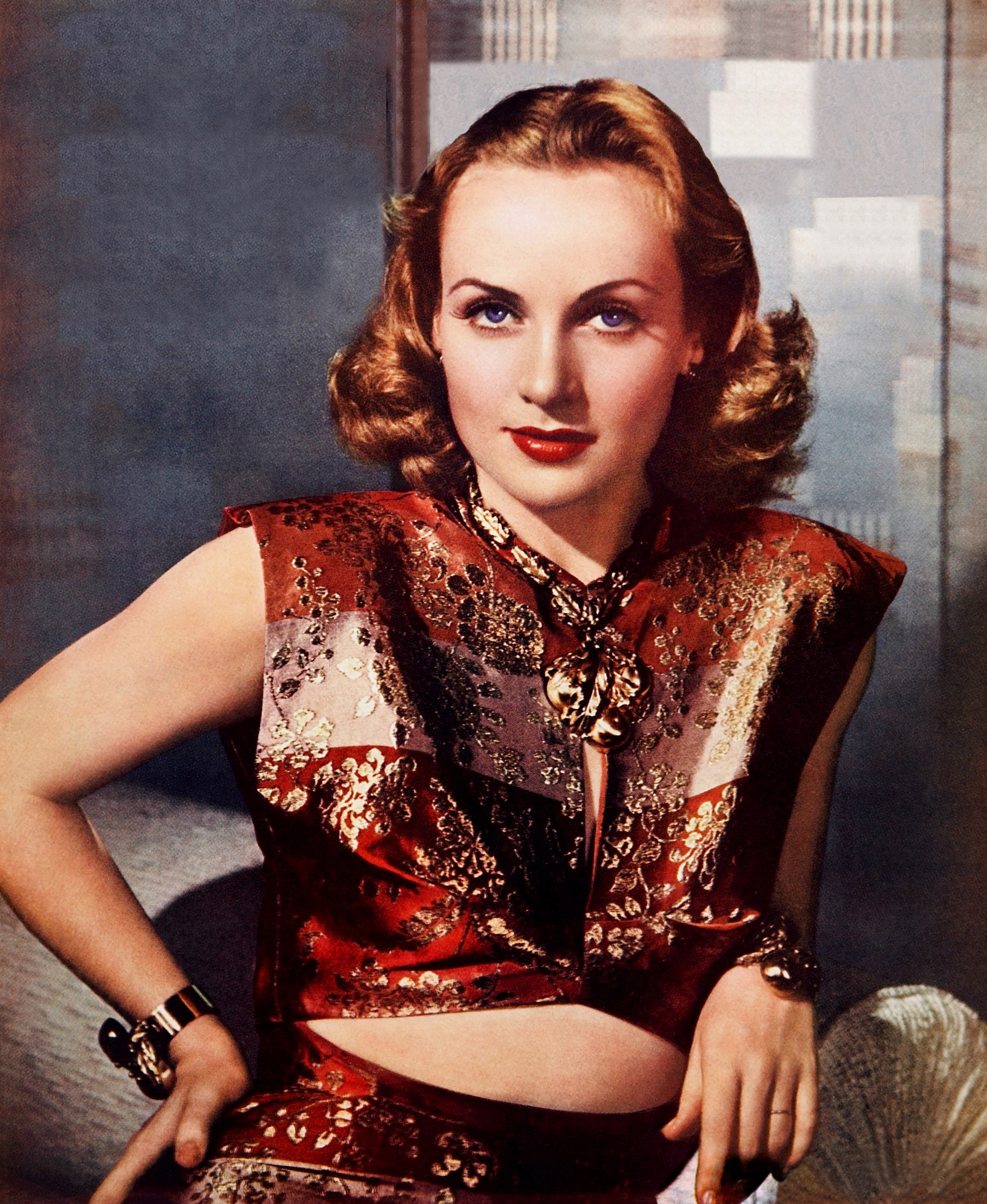
- Lombard in 1940
- Born: Jane Alice Peters; October 6, 1908; Fort Wayne, Indiana, U.S.
- Died: January 16, 1942 (aged 33); Mount Potosi, Nevada, U.S.
- Resting place: Forest Lawn Memorial Park, Glendale, California, U.S.
- Occupation: Actress
- Years active: 1921–1942
- Spouses: William Powell (m. 1931; div. 1933) Clark Gable (m. 1939)

Carole Lombard (born Jane Alice Peters; October 6, 1908 – January 16, 1942) was an American actress, particularly noted for her energetic, often off-beat roles in screwball comedies. In 1999, the American Film Institute ranked Lombard 23rd on its list of the greatest female stars of Classic Hollywood Cinema.

Lombard was born into a wealthy family in Fort Wayne, Indiana, but was raised in Los Angeles by her single mother. At 12, she was recruited by director Allan Dwan and made her screen debut in A Perfect Crime (1921). She signed a contract with the Fox Film Corporation at age 16, but mainly played bit parts and was dropped after a year. Her career came close to ending shortly before her 19th birthday when a shattered windshield from a car accident left a scar on her face, but she overcame this challenge and appeared in 15 short comedies for Mack Sennett from 1927 to 1929, and then began appearing in feature films such as High Voltage (1929) and The Racketeer (1929). After a successful appearance in The Arizona Kid (1930), she was signed to a contract by Paramount Pictures.

Paramount quickly began casting Lombard as a leading lady, primarily in drama films. Her profile increased when she married William Powell in 1931, but the couple divorced amicably after two years. A turning point in Lombard's career came when she starred in Howard Hawks's pioneering screwball comedy Twentieth Century (1934). The actress found her niche in this genre, and continued to appear in films such as Hands Across the Table (1935, forming a popular partnership with Fred MacMurray); My Man Godfrey (1936), for which she was nominated for the Academy Award for Best Actress and co-starring with Powell; and Nothing Sacred (1937). At this time, Lombard married Clark Gable, and the supercouple gained much attention from the media. Keen to win an Oscar, Lombard began to move toward serious roles at the end of the decade. Unsuccessful in this aim, she returned to comedy in Alfred Hitchcock's Mr. & Mrs. Smith (1941) and Ernst Lubitsch's To Be or Not to Be (1942), her final film role.

Lombard died at the age of 33 in the crash of TWA Flight 3 on Mount Potosi, Nevada, while returning from a war bond tour. She was one of the definitive actresses of the screwball comedy genre and American comedy and an icon of American cinema.

== Life and career ==
=== Early life and education (1908–1920) ===
Lombard was born in Fort Wayne, Indiana, on October 6, 1908, at 704 Rockhill Street. Christened Jane Alice Peters, she was the third child and only daughter of Frederic Christian Peters and Elizabeth Jayne "Bessie" (Knight) Peters. Her two older brothers, with whom she was close all her life, were Frederic Charles and John Stuart. Lombard's parents both came from wealthy families, and biographer Robert Matzen called her early years her "silver spoon period". Her parents' marriage was strained, and in October 1914, her mother took the children and moved to Los Angeles. Although the couple did not divorce, the separation was permanent. Her father's continued financial support allowed the family to live comfortably, and they settled into an apartment near Venice Boulevard.

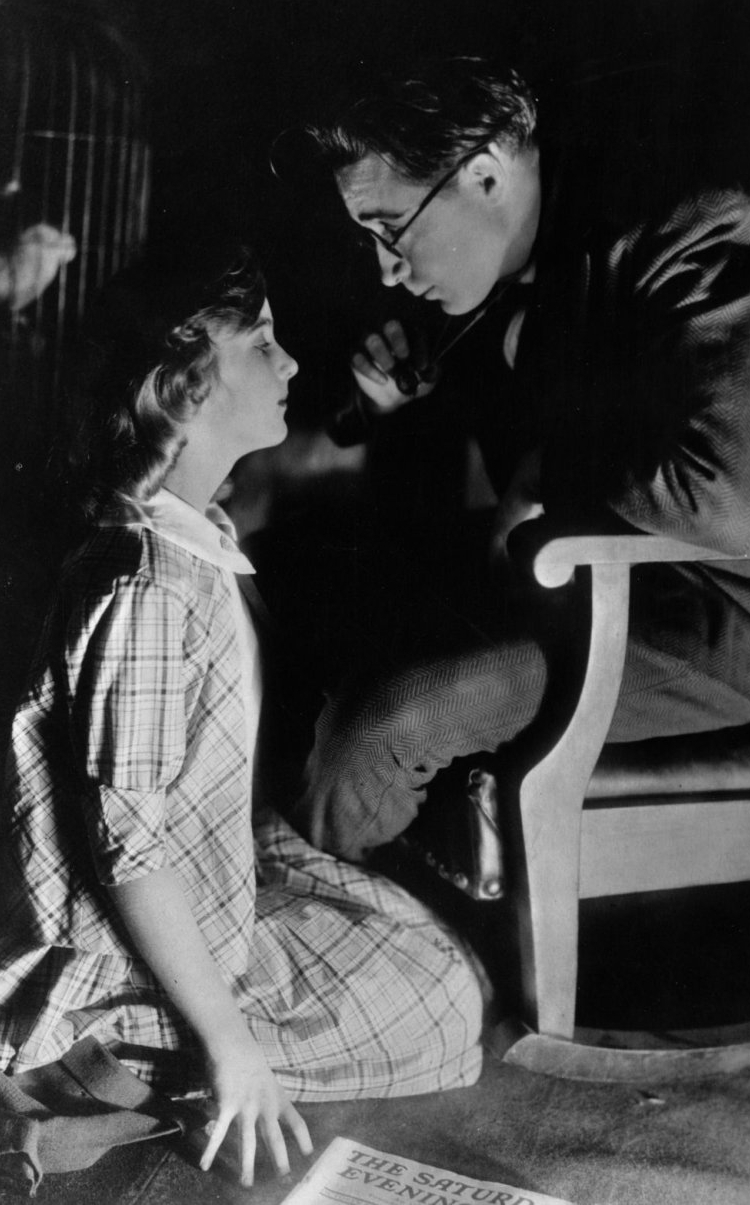
Lombard, aged 12, with Monte Blue in her film debut, A Perfect Crime (1921)

At Virgil Junior High School, Lombard participated in tennis, volleyball, and swimming, and won trophies in athletics. At the age of 12, her passion for sports landed Lombard her first screen role. While playing baseball, she caught the attention of film director Allan Dwan, who later recalled seeing "a cute-looking little tomboy... out there knocking the hell out of the other kids, playing better baseball than they were. And I needed someone of her type for this picture." With the encouragement of her mother, Lombard took a small role in the melodrama A Perfect Crime (1921). She was on set for two days, playing the sister of Monte Blue. Dwan later said "She ate it up."

=== Career beginnings and Fox contract (1921–1926) ===
Though A Perfect Crime was not widely distributed, the experience spurred Lombard and her mother to audition for more film work, but she was unsuccessful. While appearing as the queen of Fairfax High School's May Day Carnival at the age of 15, Lombard was scouted by an employee of Charlie Chaplin and offered a screen test to appear in The Gold Rush (1925). Lombard did not win the role, but her test was seen by the Vitagraph Film Company, which expressed interest in signing her. Although this did not materialize, their condition that she adopt a new first name led to her selecting the name "Carole" after a girl with whom she played tennis at Virgil Jr. High School.

In October 1924, 16-year-old Lombard signed a contract with the Fox Film Corporation. Lombard's mother contacted gossip columnist Louella Parsons, who arranged a screen test. According to biographer Larry Swindell, Lombard's beauty convinced studio head Winfield Sheehan to sign her to a $75-per-week contract, and she abandoned her schooling to pursue the new career. Fox disliked her surname and she was renamed Carole Lombard, the surname of a family friend.

Most of Lombard's appearances with Fox were bit parts in low-budget Westerns and adventure films. She later said, "All I had to do was simper prettily at the hero and scream with terror when he battled with the villain." However, she enjoyed other aspects of film work such as photo shoots, costume fittings, and socializing with actors on the studio set. Lombard embraced the flapper lifestyle and became a regular at the Cocoanut Grove nightclub, where she won several Charleston dance competitions.

In March 1925, Lombard landed a leading role in the drama Marriage in Transit with Edmund Lowe. A reviewer for Motion Picture News wrote that Lombard displayed "good poise and considerable charm". However, the studio heads were unconvinced that Lombard was leading-lady material, and her contract was not renewed. Wes D. Gehring, in his 2003 biography Carole Lombard: The Hoosier Tornado, has suggested a facial scar resulting from a car crash was a factor in this decision, but that incident occurred nearly two years later on September 9, 1927. According to historian Olympia Kiriakou, on the night of the crash, Lombard was on a date with a man named Harry Cooper. On Santa Monica Boulevard, Cooper hit another car; the windshield shattered and shards of glass cut "Lombard's face from her nose and across her left cheek to her eye." Lombard underwent reconstructive surgery and faced a long recovery period. For the remainder of her career, Lombard learned to hide the mark with makeup and careful lighting. At the time of the crash, Lombard was already under contract with Mack Sennett. In October 1927, Lombard and her mother Bess sued Cooper for $35,000 in damages, citing in the lawsuit that "where she formerly was able to earn a salary of $300 monthly as a Sennett girl, she is now unable to obtain employment of any kind." The lawsuit was settled out of court, and Lombard received $3,000. Although Lombard feared that the incident would end her career, Sennett pledged to help her recover. He afforded her "lucrative film roles and ample publicity", including the nickname "Carole of the Curves". Kiriakou explains, "the nickname simultaneously drew audiences' focus away from her facial scars and worked harmoniously with the physicality and female sensuality that were emblematic of Lombard's performances" in Sennett's films.

=== Breakthrough and early success (1927–1929) ===
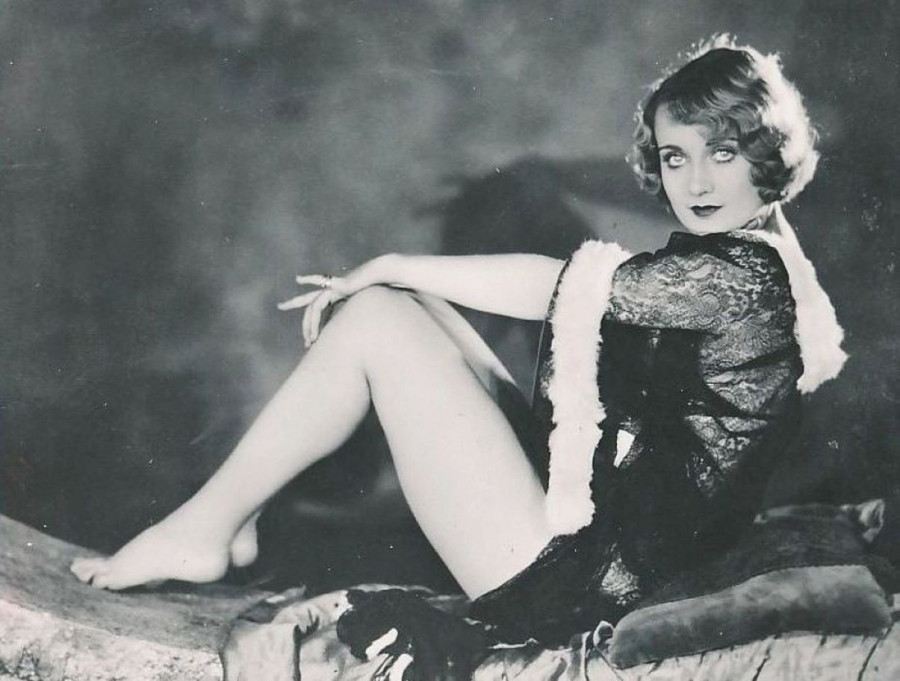
Lombard in a publicity still from 1927, during her time as a "Mack Sennett girl"

Although Lombard initially had reservations about slapstick comedies, she became one of Sennett Bathing Beauties and appeared in 18 short films from September 1927 to March 1929. Lombard's first experiences in comedy provided valuable training for her future comedic work. In 1940, she called her Sennett years "the turning point of [my] acting career".

Sennett's productions were distributed by Pathé Exchange, and the company began casting Lombard in feature films. She had prominent roles in Show Folks and Ned McCobb's Daughter (both 1928), and reviewers observed that she made a "good impression" and was "worth watching". The following year, Pathé elevated Lombard to a leading lady. Her success in Raoul Walsh's picture Me, Gangster (also 1928), with June Collyer and Don Terry in his film debut, finally eased the pressure that her family had been exerting for her to succeed.

In Howard Higgin's High Voltage (1929), Lombard's first sound film, she played a criminal in the custody of a deputy sheriff, both of whom are among bus passengers stranded in deep snow. Her next film, the comedy Big News (1929), cast her with Robert Armstrong and was a critical and commercial success. Lombard was reunited with Armstrong for the crime drama The Racketeer, released in late 1929. The review in Film Daily wrote: "Carol Lombard proves a real surprise, and does her best work to date. In fact, this is the first opportunity she has had to prove that she has the stuff to go over."

=== Paramount contract and first marriage (1930–1933) ===
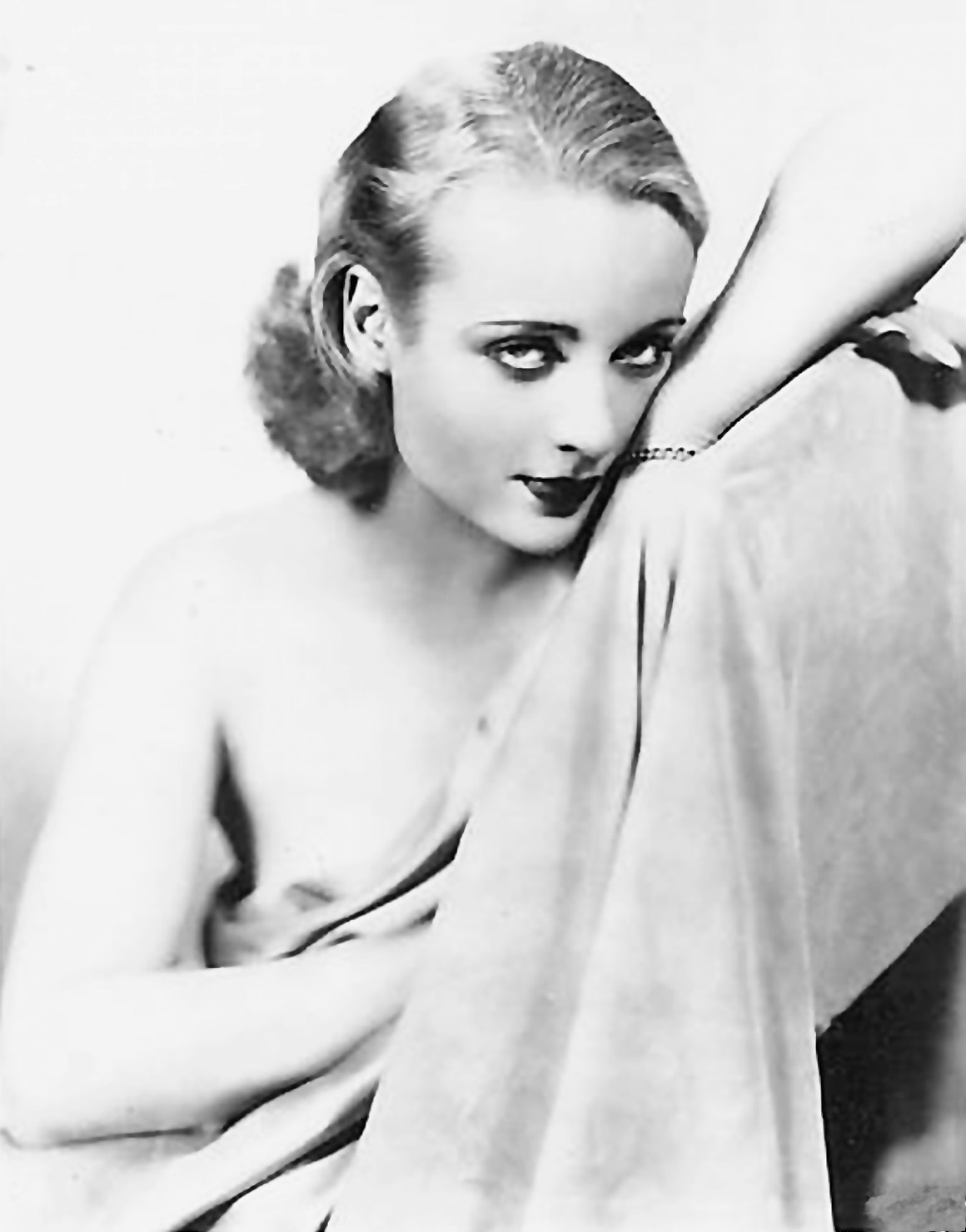
Lombard in a picture taken by William E. Thomas, 1929

Lombard returned to Fox for a one-off role in the Western The Arizona Kid (1930). It was a big release for the studio, starring the popular actor Warner Baxter, in which Lombard received third billing. Following the success of the film, Paramount Pictures recruited Lombard and signed her to a $350-per-week contract, gradually increasing to $3,500 per week by 1936. They cast her in the Buddy Rogers comedy Safety in Numbers (also 1930), and one critic observed of her work, "Lombard proves [to be] an ace comedienne." For her second assignment, Fast and Loose (also 1930) with Miriam Hopkins, Paramount mistakenly credited the actress as "Carole Lombard". She decided she liked this spelling and it became her permanent screen name. (Note: In her lifetime, the media reported that Lombard added the extra "e" to Carol at the advice of a numerologist. She denied this to Garson Kanin, saying, "That's a lot of bunk." Some of the Mack Sennett shorts had already used the spelling "Carole", but this is thought to have been an accident. Her name was not consistently billed and reported with this spelling until 1930. She legally changed her name to "Carole Lombard" in 1936.)

Lombard appeared in five films released during 1931, beginning with the Frank Tuttle comedy It Pays to Advertise. Her next two films, Man of the World and Ladies Man, both featured William Powell, Paramount's top male star. Lombard had been a fan of the actor before they met and they were soon in a relationship. The differences between the pair have been noted by biographers: She was 22, carefree, and famously foul-mouthed, and he was 38, intellectual, and sophisticated. Despite this, Lombard married Powell on June 26, 1931, at her Beverly Hills home. Talking to the media, she argued for the benefits of "love between two people who are diametrically different", claiming that their relationship allowed for a "perfect see-saw love".

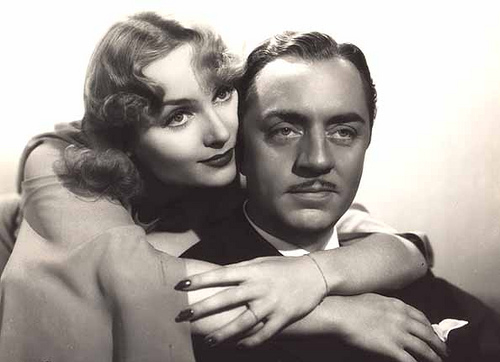
Lombard with her first husband, William Powell

The marriage to Powell increased Lombard's fame, while she continued to please critics with her work in Up Pops the Devil and I Take this Woman (both 1931). In reviews for the latter film, which co-starred Gary Cooper, several critics predicted that Lombard was set to become a major star. She went on to appear in five films throughout 1932. No One Man and Sinners in the Sun were not successful, but Edward Buzzell's romantic picture Virtue was well received. After featuring in the drama No More Orchids, Lombard was cast as the wife of a con artist in No Man of Her Own with Clark Gable The film was a critical and commercial success, and Wes Gehring writes that it was "arguably Lombard's finest film appearance" to that point. It was the only picture that Gable and Lombard made together. There was no romantic interest at this time, however, as she recounted to Garson Kanin: "[we] did all kinds of hot love scenes ... and I never got any kind of tremble out of him at all". (Note: At the time, Lombard was married to Powell (and told Kanin she was "on my ear about a different number at that time") while Gable was married to Ria Langham and having an affair with Joan Crawford.)

In August 1933, Lombard and Powell divorced after 26 months of marriage, but they remained friends until the end of Lombard's life. At the time, she blamed the end of their marriage on their careers, but in a 1936 interview, she admitted that this "had little to do with the divorce. We were just two completely incompatible people".

She appeared in five films that year, beginning with the drama From Hell to Heaven and continuing with Supernatural, her only horror vehicle. After a small role in The Eagle and the Hawk, a war film starring Fredric March and Cary Grant, she starred in two melodramas: Brief Moment, which critics enjoyed, and White Woman, where she was paired with Charles Laughton.

Lombard was involved romantically with Russ Columbo, the famous crooner killed in a tragic accident in 1934. Lombard had been guiding Columbo's movie and radio career and told Sonia Lee of Mirror magazine in 1934 that they had been engaged. Other press outlets had reported on their relationship earlier that year; Screenland Magazine declared, "the Russ Columbo and Carole Lombard romance is one of Hollywood's most charming."

=== Success in screwball comedies (1934–1935) ===
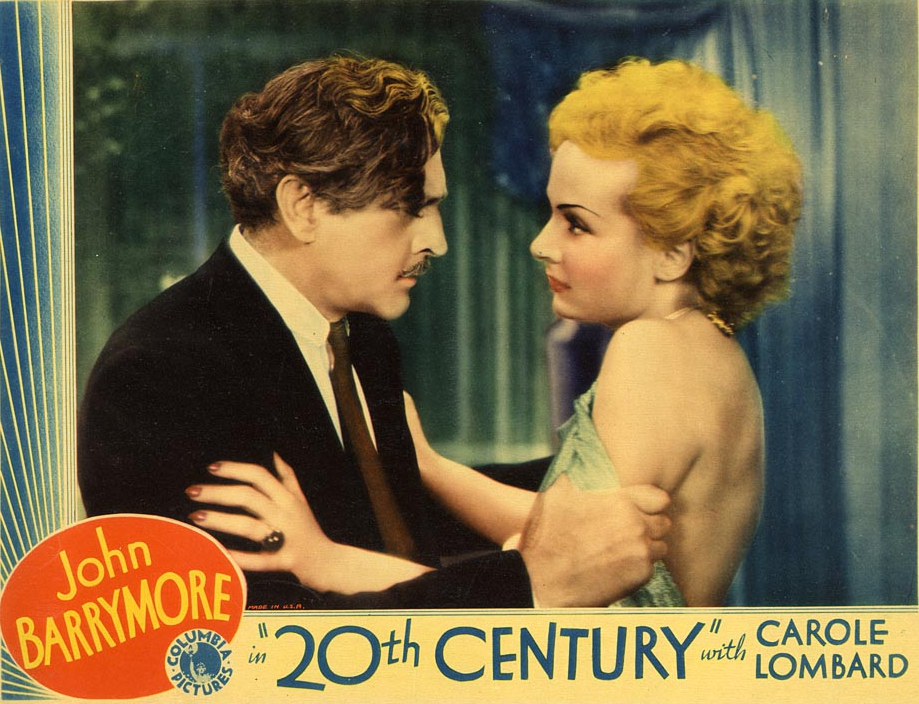
Lombard in the lobby card for Twentieth Century (1934), considered a pioneering screwball comedy: The film made her a major star.

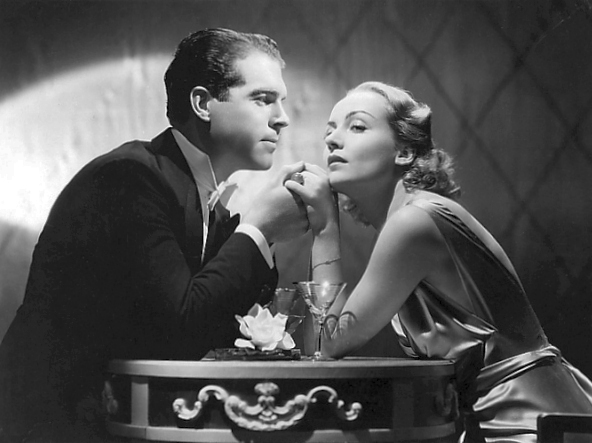
Lombard made four comedies with Fred MacMurray, beginning with Hands Across the Table (1935).

1934 marked a high point in Lombard's career, beginning with Wesley Ruggles's musical drama Bolero, where she and George Raft showcased their dancing skills in an extravagantly staged performance to Maurice Ravel's Boléro. She had been offered the lead female role in It Happened One Night but turned it down because of scheduling conflicts. (Note: It Happened One Night became a major success and won five Academy Awards, including Best Picture and Best Actress for Claudette Colbert in the role that Lombard would have played.) Bolero was favorably received, while her next film We're Not Dressing was a box-office hit with Bing Crosby.

Lombard was then recruited by director Howard Hawks to star in his screwball Twentieth Century which proved a watershed in her career and made her a major star. Hawks had seen her inebriated at a party, where he found her to be "hilarious and uninhibited and just what the part needed", and she was cast with John Barrymore. In Twentieth Century, Lombard plays an actress who is pursued by her former mentor, a flamboyant Broadway impresario. Hawks and Barrymore were unimpressed with her work in rehearsals, finding that she was "acting" too hard and giving a stiff performance. The director encouraged Lombard to relax, be herself, and act on her instincts. (Note: Hawks recalled, "She acted like a schoolgirl ... and she was stiff, she would try to imagine a character and then act according to her imaginings instead of being herself." He eventually felt that Lombard had overcome this in a scene, and he said to Barrymore, "you've just seen a girl that's probably going to be a big star, and if we can just keep her from acting, we'll have a hell of a picture.") She responded well to this tutoring, and reviews for the film commented on her unexpectedly "fiery talent", "a Lombard like no Lombard you've ever seen". The Los Angeles Times' critic felt that she was "entirely different" from her formerly cool, "calculated" persona: "she vibrates with life and passion, abandon and diablerie".

The next films in which Lombard appeared were Henry Hathaway's Now and Forever (1934), featuring Gary Cooper and the new child star Shirley Temple, and Lady by Choice (1934), which was a critical and commercial success. The Gay Bride (1934) placed her with Chester Morris in a gangster comedy, but it was panned by critics. She reunited with George Raft for Rumba (1935) where she was given the opportunity to repeat the screwball success of Twentieth Century. In Mitchell Leisen's Hands Across the Table (1935), she portrays a manicurist in search of a rich husband, played by Fred MacMurray. Critics praised the film, and Photoplay's reviewer stated that Lombard had reaffirmed her talent for the genre. It is remembered as one of her best films, and the pairing of Lombard and MacMurray proved so successful that they made three more pictures together.

=== Critical recognition (1936–1937) ===
Lombard's first film of 1936 was Love Before Breakfast, described by Gehring as "The Taming of the Shrew, screwball style". In William K. Howard's The Princess Comes Across, her second comedy with MacMurray, she played a budding actress who wins a film contract by masquerading as a Swedish princess. The performance was considered a satire of Greta Garbo and was widely praised by critics. Lombard's success continued as she was recruited by Universal Studios to star in the screwball comedy My Man Godfrey (1936). William Powell, who was playing the eponymous Godfrey, insisted on her being cast as the female lead; despite their divorce, the pair remained friendly and Powell felt she would be perfect in the role of Irene, a zany heiress who employs a "forgotten man" as the family butler. The film was directed by Gregory La Cava, who knew Lombard personally and advised that she draw on her "eccentric nature" for the role. She worked hard on the performance, particularly with finding the appropriate facial expressions for Irene. My Man Godfrey was released to great acclaim and was a box-office hit. It received six nominations at the 9th Academy Awards, including Lombard for Best Actress. (Note: At the Academy Awards ceremony, Lombard was announced as the nominee with the second-highest number of votes. The award went to Luise Rainer for The Great Ziegfeld.) Biographers cite it as her finest performance, and Frederick Ott says it "clearly established [her] as a comedienne of the first rank."

By 1937, Lombard was one of Hollywood's most popular actresses, and also the highest-paid star in Hollywood following the deal which Myron Selznick negotiated with Paramount that brought her $450,000, more than five times the salary of the U.S. president. As her salary was widely reported in the press, Lombard stated that 80% of her earnings went in taxes, but that she was happy to help improve her country. The comments earned her much positive publicity, and President Franklin D. Roosevelt sent her a personal letter of thanks.

Her first release of the year was Leisen's Swing High, Swing Low, a third pairing with MacMurray. The film focused on a romance between two cabaret performers, and was a critical and commercial success. It had been primarily a drama, with occasional moments of comedy, but for her next project, Nothing Sacred, Lombard returned to the screwball genre. Producer David O. Selznick, impressed by her work in My Man Godfrey, was eager to make a comedy with the actress and hired Ben Hecht to write an original screenplay for her. Nothing Sacred, directed by William Wellman and co-starring Fredric March, satirized the journalism industry and "the gullible urban masses". Lombard portrayed a small-town girl who pretends to be dying and finds her story exploited by a New York reporter. The film was Lombard's only Technicolor feature-length production, and she later praised it highly as one of her personal favorites.

Lombard continued with screwball comedies, next starring in True Confession (1937), what Swindell calls one of her "wackiest" films. She played a compulsive liar who wrongly confesses to murder. Lombard loved the script and was excited about the project, which reunited her with John Barrymore and was her final appearance with MacMurray. Her prediction that it "smacked of a surefire success" proved accurate as critics responded positively, and it was popular at the box office.

=== Dramatic efforts and second marriage (1938–1940) ===
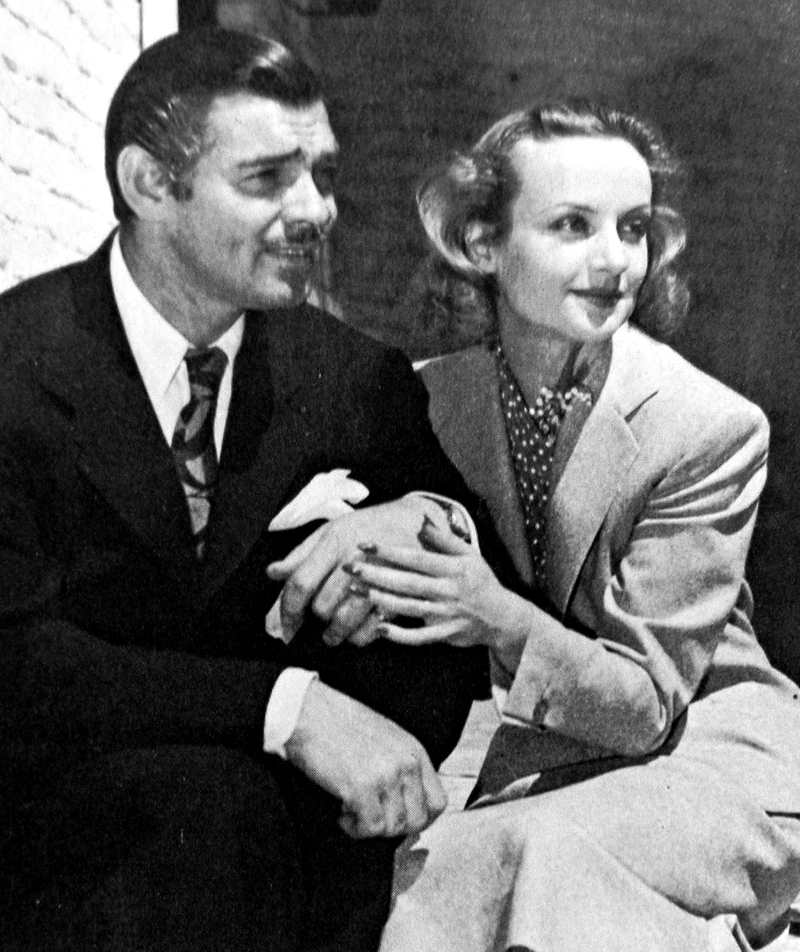
Lombard with her second husband, Clark Gable after their honeymoon in 1939

True Confession was the last film Lombard made on her Paramount contract, and she remained an independent performer for the rest of her career. Her next film was made at Warner Bros. Pictures, where she played a famous actress in Mervyn LeRoy's Fools for Scandal (1938). The comedy met with scathing reviews and was a commercial failure, with Swindell calling it "one of the most horrendous flops of the thirties".

Fools for Scandal was the only film Lombard made in 1938. By this time, she was devoted to her relationship with Clark Gable. The pair had reunited at a Hollywood party Lombard hosted in January 1936, having met on the set of No Man of Her Own in 1932. They had initially disliked each other due to their different personalities, but that night, Gable brought Lombard to his hotel, hoping to have sex with her, to which she replied, "Who do you think you are, Clark Gable?" He brought her back to the party, then back to her house, where she insulted him about his affair with Loretta Young (with whom he had fathered a secret child). The next morning, regretting her harshness, she sent him doves as a peace offering, and they began a romance early in 1936. The media took great interest in their partnership and frequently questioned if they would wed. Gable was separated from his wife, Maria, but she did not want to grant him a divorce. As his relationship with Lombard became serious, Maria eventually agreed to a settlement. (Note: Gable had to give Maria $350,000 in cash plus additional property, leading to a total settlement worth more than half a million. The expense of the divorce contributed to Gable's agreement to portray Rhett Butler in Gone With the Wind.) The divorce was finalized in March 1939, and Gable and Lombard eloped in Kingman, Arizona on March 29. The couple bought a 20-acre (8.1 ha) ranch in Encino, California, where they kept barnyard animals and enjoyed hunting trips. Almost immediately, Lombard wanted to start a family, but her attempts failed; after two miscarriages and numerous trips to fertility specialists, she was unable to have children. Lombard once said, "My God, you know how I love Pa, but I can't say he's a helluva good lay."

In early 1938, Lombard officially enrolled in the Baháʼí Faith, which her mother had been a member of since 1922; as a child she had attended Bahá'í gatherings at the Los Angeles home of Mrs. Orol Platt (born Laura Arkell), who had introduced her mother to the Faith, and had written to ʻAbdu'l-Bahá at around age fourteen, receiving a Tablet in reply. At her enrollment, Mrs. Sara Kenny, then a member of the Los Angeles Local Spiritual Assembly, recalled her saying: "I have acted many parts, I have been in many plays, but this is the greatest act of my life, this is why I was born."

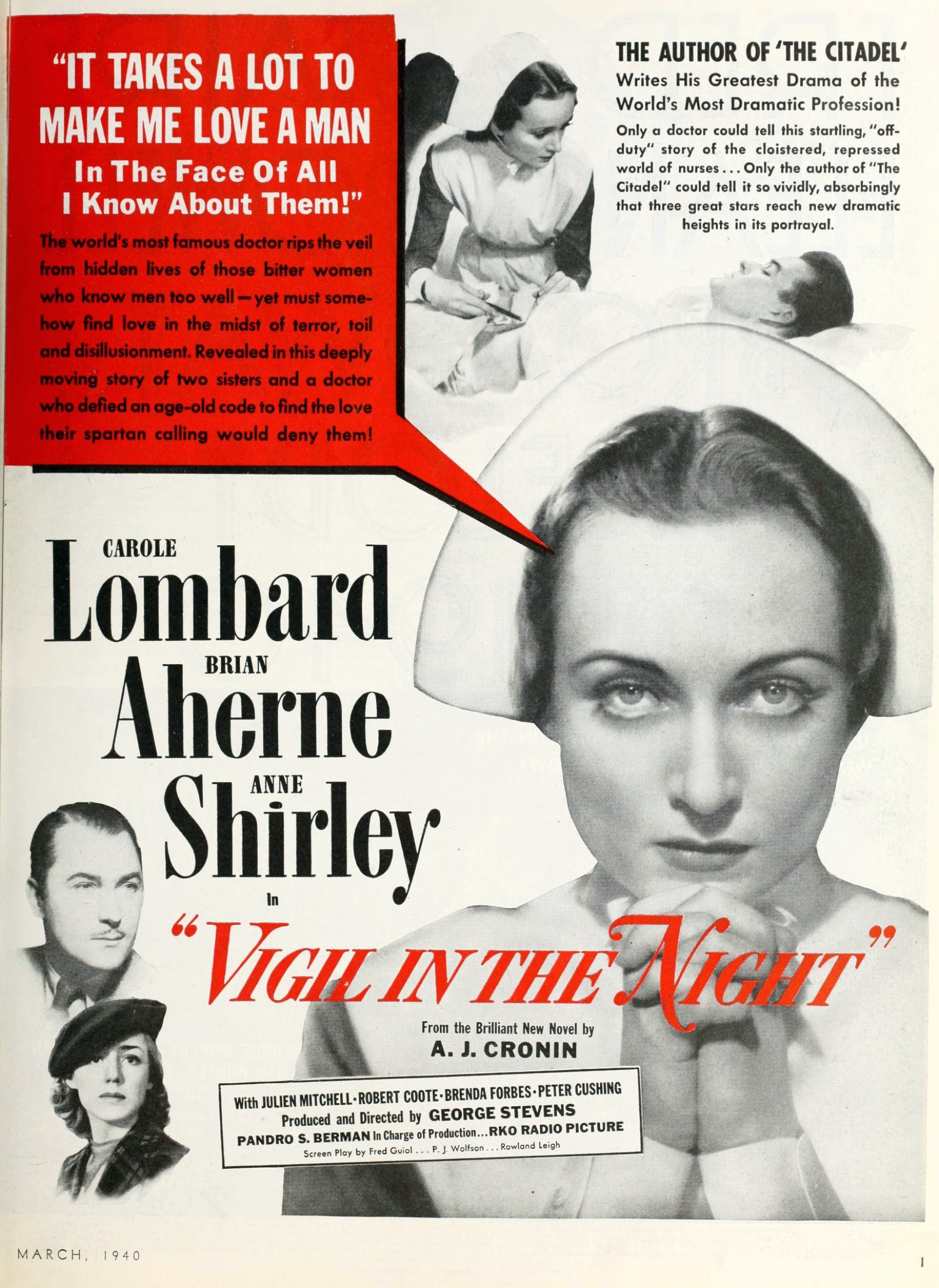
Lombard in an advertisement for Vigil in the Night (1940), which she hoped would bring her an Oscar

While continuing with a slower work-rate, Lombard decided to move away from comedies and return to dramatic roles. She appeared in Made for Each Other (1939) with James Stewart playing a couple facing domestic difficulties. Reviews for the film were highly positive, and praised Lombard's dramatic effort; financially, it was a disappointment. Lombard's next appearance came with Cary Grant in the John Cromwell romance In Name Only (1939), a credit she personally negotiated with RKO Radio Pictures upon hearing of the script and Grant's involvement. The role reflected her recent experiences, as she played a woman in love with a married man whose wife refuses to divorce. She was paid $150,000 for the film, continuing her status as one of Hollywood's highest-paid actresses, and it was a moderate success. At the 12th Academy Awards ceremony in February 1940, Lombard was quoted as comforting Gable after his loss as Rhett Butler from Gone with the Wind, with the comment "Don't worry, Pappy. We'll bring one home next year". Gable replied that he felt this had been his last chance to which Lombard was said to have replied, "Not you, you self-centered bastard. I meant me."

Lombard was eager to win an Academy Award, and selected her next project with the expectation that it would bring her the trophy. Vigil in the Night (1940), directed by George Stevens, featured Lombard as a nurse who faces a series of personal difficulties. Although the performance was praised, she did not get her nomination, as the sombre mood of the picture turned audiences away and box-office returns were poor. Despite the realization that she was best suited to comedies, Lombard completed the drama They Knew What They Wanted (1940), co-starring Charles Laughton, which was mildly successful, and which did receive an Oscar nomination—for her co-star, William Gargan, for Best Supporting Actor.

=== Final roles (1941–1942) ===
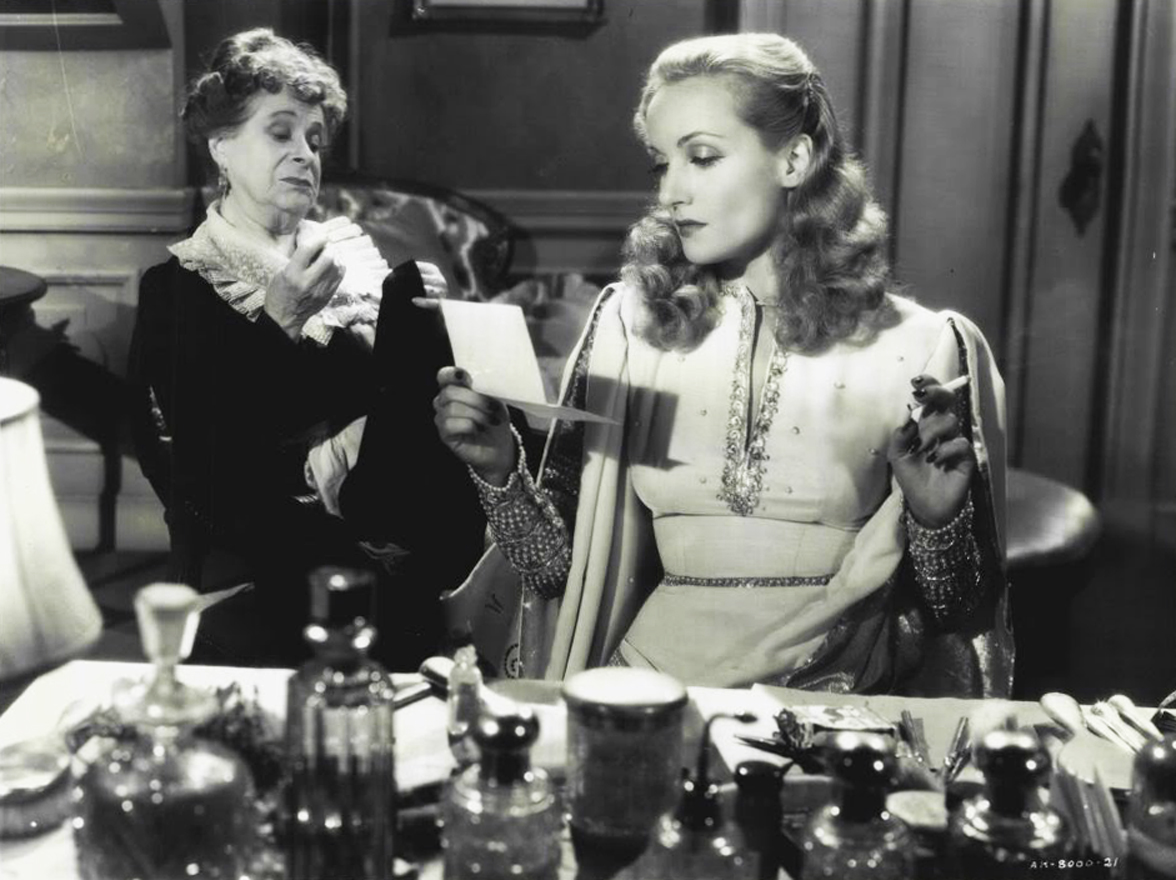
Lombard in her final role in To Be or Not to Be (1942)

Accepting that "my name doesn't sell tickets to serious pictures", Lombard returned to comedy in Mr. & Mrs. Smith (1941), about a couple who learns that their marriage is invalid, with Robert Montgomery. Lombard was influential in bringing Alfred Hitchcock, whom she knew through David O. Selznick, to direct one of his most atypical films. It was a commercial success, and audiences were happy with what Swindell calls "the belated happy news ... that Carole Lombard was a screwball once more."

It was nearly a year before Lombard committed to another film, as she focused instead on her home and marriage. (Note: Rumors at this time stated that Gable and Lombard were experiencing marital difficulties; in 1941, they put their home up for sale, but soon took it off the market, which was taken as evidence that they had separated and then reconciled. Lombard was also eager to get pregnant, but had difficulty conceiving.) Determined that her next film be "an unqualified smash hit", she was also careful in selecting a new project. Through her agent, Lombard heard of Ernst Lubitsch's upcoming film: To Be or Not to Be (1942), a dark comedy that satirized the Nazi takeover of Poland. The actress had long wanted to work with Lubitsch, and felt that the material—although controversial—was a worthy subject. Lombard accepted the role of actress Maria Tura, despite it being a smaller part than she was used to, and was given top billing over the film's male lead Jack Benny. Filming took place in the fall of 1941, and it was reportedly one of the happier experiences of Lombard's career.

== Death ==
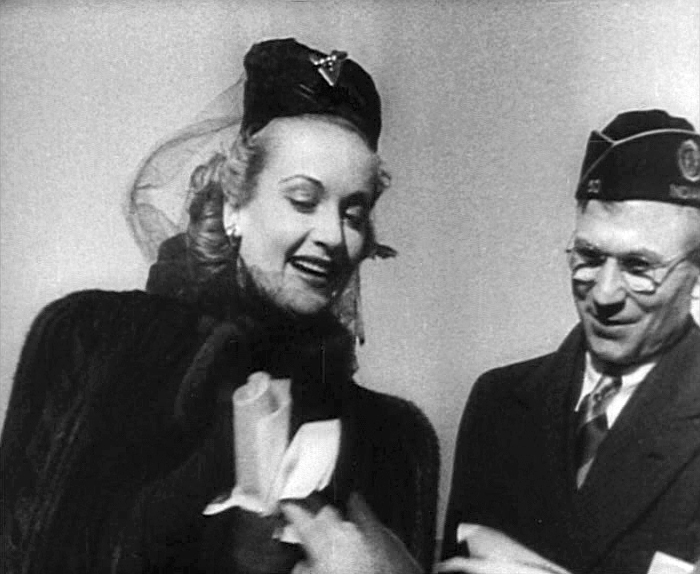

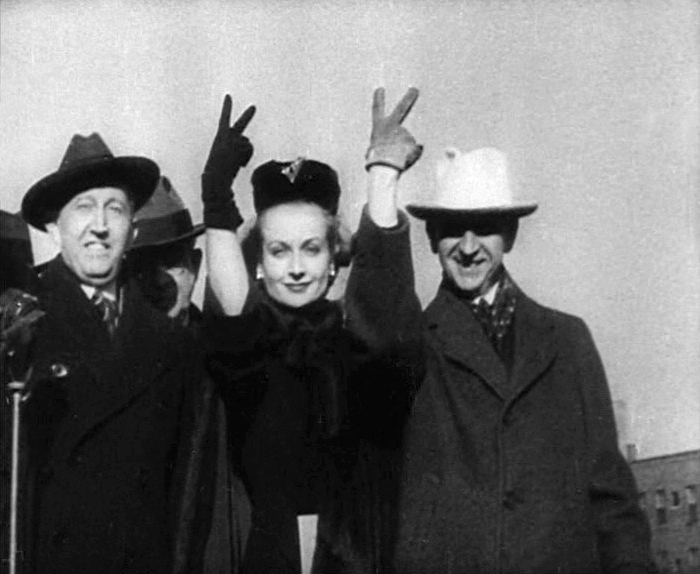
Lombard in Indianapolis on January 15, 1942, shortly before her death in a plane crash

When the U.S. entered World War II, Lombard traveled to her home state of Indiana for a war bond rally with her mother and Clark Gable's press agent, Otto Winkler. Lombard raised more than $2 million in defense bonds in a single evening. Her party had been scheduled to return to Los Angeles by train, but Lombard was eager to reach home more quickly and wanted to travel by air. Her mother and Winkler were afraid of flying and wanted the group to follow their original travel plans. In the early morning hours of January 16, 1942, Lombard, her mother and Winkler boarded a Transcontinental and Western Air Douglas DST (Douglas Sleeper Transport) aircraft to return to California. (Note: The Douglas DST or Douglas Sleeper Transport was an airliner with either 24 passenger seats in daytime operation or fitted out with 16 sleeper bunks in the cabin.) After refueling in Las Vegas, TWA Flight 3 took off at 7:07 p.m. and crashed into Double Up Peak near the 8,300 ft (2,530 m) level of Potosi Mountain, 32 mi (51 km) southwest of the Las Vegas airport. All 22 aboard, including Lombard, her mother, Winkler and 15 U.S. Army soldiers, were killed. Lombard was 33 years old.

The crash's cause was attributed to the flight crew's inability to properly navigate over the mountains surrounding Las Vegas. As a precaution against the possibility of enemy Japanese bomber aircraft coming into American airspace from the Pacific, safety beacons normally used to direct night flights had been turned off, leaving the pilot and crew of the TWA flight without visual warnings of the mountains in their flight path.

=== Aftermath ===
When The Jack Benny Program aired on January 18, Jack Benny did not attend the live radio broadcast. At its opening, announcer Don Wilson stated Benny would not appear that night, but did not explain why. The show that night did not feature any comedy, just musical numbers. Lombard had been scheduled to appear on the following Sunday's broadcast. Lombard's funeral was on January 21 at Forest Lawn Memorial Park Cemetery in Glendale, California. She was interred beside her mother under the name of Carole Lombard Gable. Despite remarrying twice following her death, Gable was interred beside Lombard when he died in 1960.

To Be or Not to Be, Lombard's final film, was in post-production at the time of her death. Allegedly, the film's producers decided to cut a line in which Lombard's character asks "What can happen on a plane?" out of respect for the circumstances surrounding her death. Although there is no indication that this line existed and was removed posthumously, the film's script as filed with the Production Code Administration included the addendum,

This certificate is issued with the understanding that Anna's speech: "No, not at all..." down to and including: "She might hit an air pocket." has been replaced; also that Sigorsky's speech "-- maybe you'll want to take care of her after my departure." has been omitted.

At the time of her death, Lombard had been scheduled to star in the film They All Kissed the Bride; when production started, she was replaced by Joan Crawford. Crawford donated all of her salary for the film to the Red Cross, which had helped extensively in the recovery of bodies from the air crash.

Shortly after Lombard's death, Gable, who was inconsolable and devastated by his loss, joined the United States Army Air Forces. Lombard had asked him to do that numerous times after the United States had entered World War II. After officer training, Gable headed a six-man motion picture unit attached to a B-17 bomb group in England to film aerial gunners in combat, flying five missions. In December 1943, the United States Maritime Commission announced that a Liberty ship named in Lombard's honor would be launched. Gable attended the launch of the SS Carole Lombard on January 15, 1944, the second anniversary of Lombard's war bond drive. The ship was involved in rescuing hundreds of survivors from sunken ships in the Pacific and returning them to safety.

In 1962, Jill Winkler Rath, widow of publicist Otto Winkler, filed a $100,000 lawsuit against the $2 million estate of Clark Gable in connection with Winkler's death. The suit was dismissed in Los Angeles Superior Court. Rath, in her action, claimed Gable promised to provide financial aid for her if she would not bring suit against the airline involved. Rath stated she later learned that Gable settled his claim against the airline for $10. He did so because he did not want to repeat his grief in court, and subsequently he provided her no financial aid in his will.

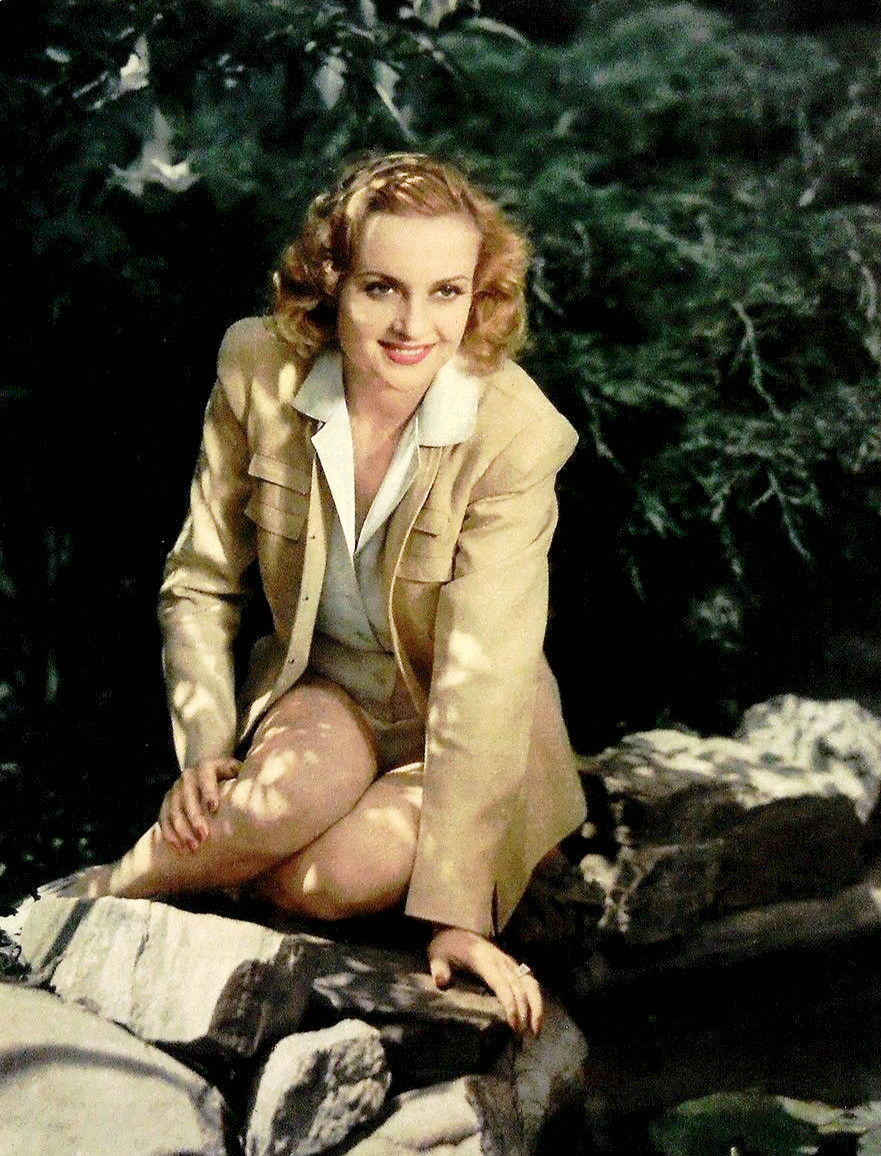
Photo of Lombard, published by the New York Sunday News shortly after her death

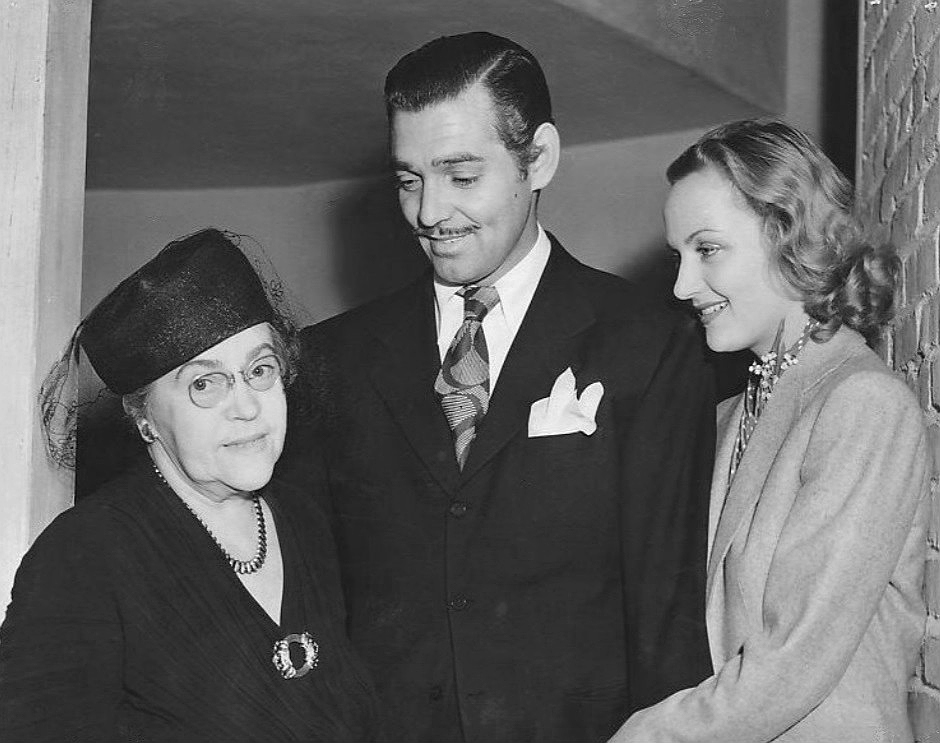
Clark Gable, Carole Lombard and Mrs. Elizabeth Peters, mother of Carole Lombard (1939)

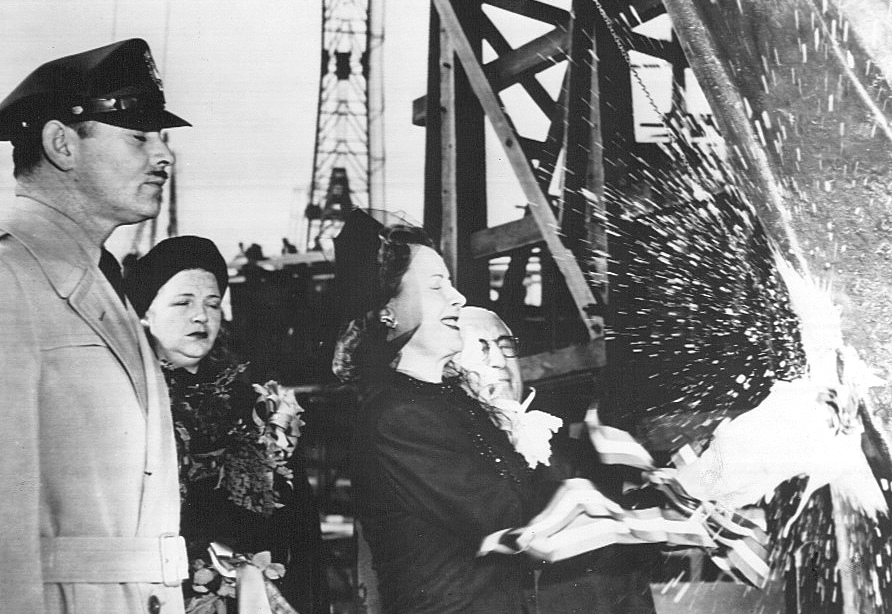
Irene Dunne and Louis B. Mayer christen SS Carole Lombard while Clark Gable and Mrs. Walter Lang, who was Lombard's secretary, observe.

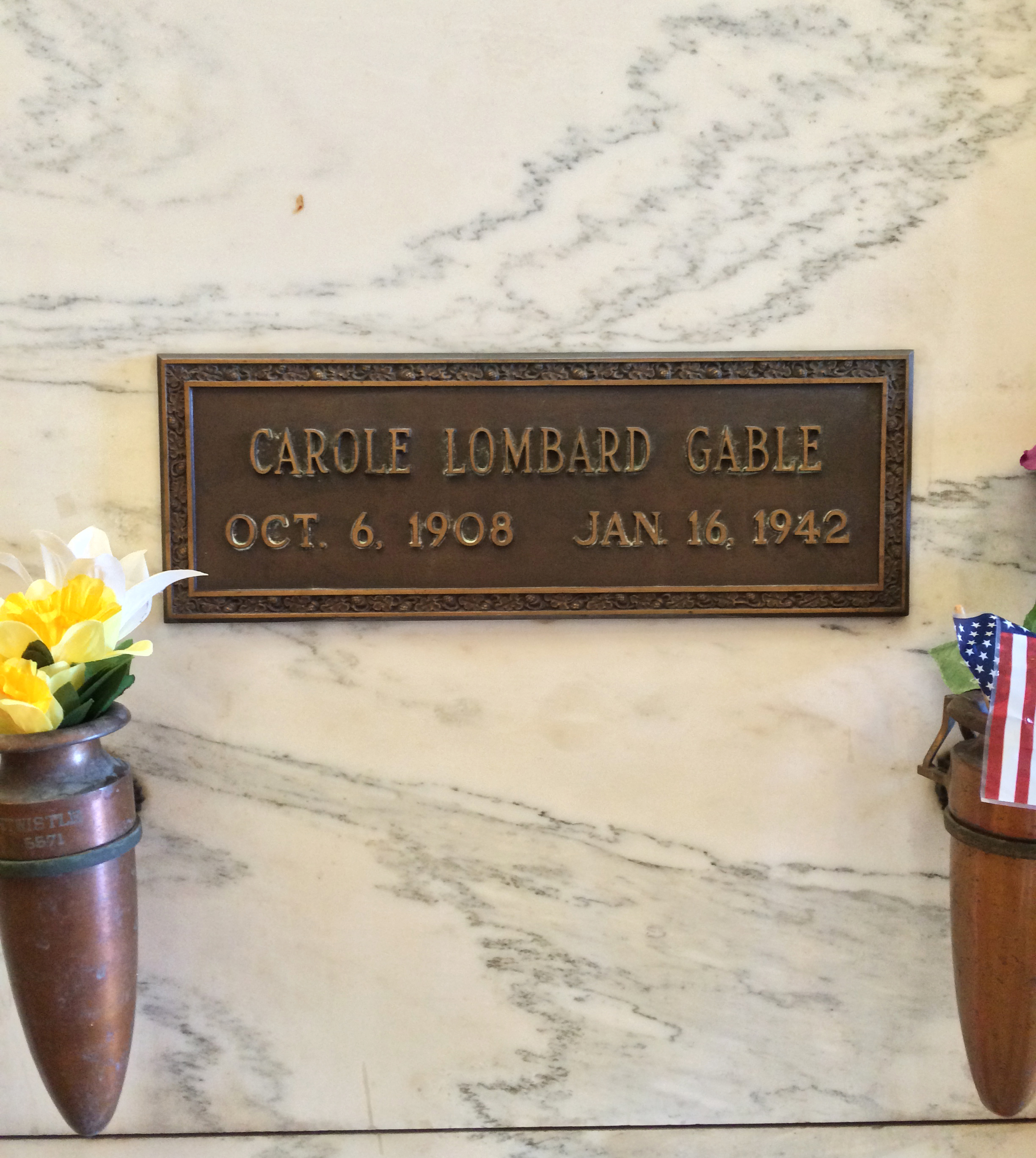
Crypt of Carole Lombard, in the Sanctuary of Trust of the Great Mausoleum, Forest Lawn Glendale

== Legacy ==
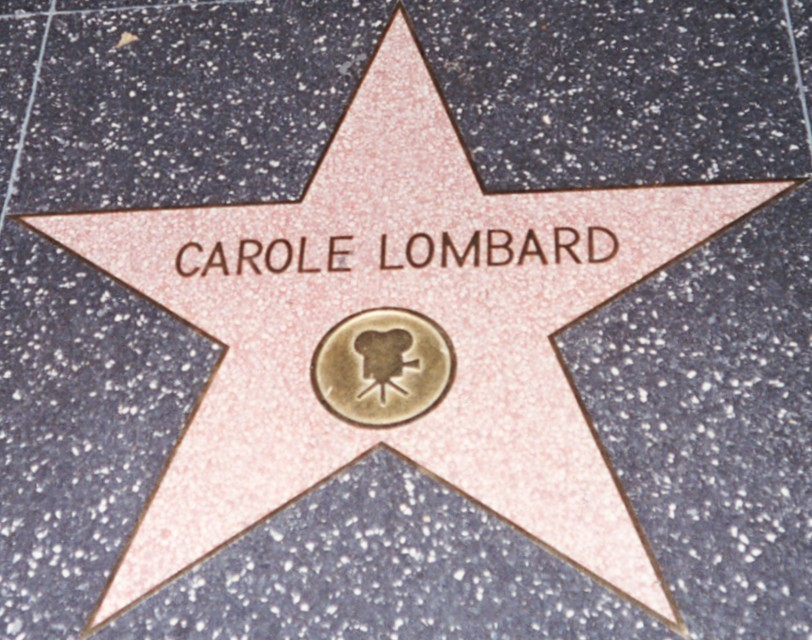
Lombard's star on the Hollywood Walk of Fame

Robert D. Matzen has cited Lombard as "among the most commercially successful and admired film personalities in Hollywood in the 1930s". Feminist June Sochen wrote that she believes that Lombard "demonstrated great knowledge of the mechanics of film making". George Raft, her co-star in Bolero, was extremely fond of the actress, remarking "I truly loved Carole Lombard. She was the greatest girl that ever lived and we were the best of pals. Completely honest and outspoken, she was liked by everyone".

Historian Olympia Kiriakou identifies Lombard as a progressive, feminist studio-era star. She describes Lombard's politics as "proto-feminist", explaining that "many of her political and social statements pre-date the second-wave feminist movement, yet were very much in line with the second wave's focus," particularly her views about women's roles in the home and workplace. Lombard's independent star persona balanced her femininity and screen glamour with "male business sense". She was described by Photoplay columnist Hart Seymore as the "perfect example of a modern Career Girl", which was based on Lombard's capability to "live by the logical premise that women have equal rights with men." In 1937, Photoplay published an article about Lombard's business acumen entitled "Carole Lombard tells: 'How I Live by a Man's Code'," in which she offers readers rules for how to be successful in business and at home such as "play fair [with men]...don't burn over criticism—stand up to it like a man." Notably, in the article Lombard tells readers that she "doesn't believe in a man's world," and encourages women to "work—and like it," adding: "All women should have something worthwhile to do, and cultivate efficiency at it, whether it be housekeeping or raising chickens. Working women are interesting women." But as Kiriakou explains, such an article was published in order "to elicit a specific response from the fan magazine readers—namely, to view Lombard's independent star as indistinguishable from the Lombard heroines they saw on screen."

Moreover, according to scholar Emily Carman, Lombard's independent female star persona was able to emerge only when she "attained greater professional autonomy in the mid-1930s," ultimately leading her to become one of the first stars of the studio-era to go freelance. Freelancing gave Lombard more autonomy over her career decisions, and the types of roles she was able to play. Additionally, Lombard was the first Hollywood star to propose profit participation: in 1938, she negotiated with Selznick International Pictures to take a reduced salary of $100,000 in exchange for a 20 percent cut of the distributor's gross of $1.6 to $1.7 million, and subsequent smaller percentages as the gross increased. Carman explains that this contract also included a "no-loan out" clause, the right to employ Travis Banton as her costume designer of choice, as well as all legal rights to her image. Carman concludes that Lombard's strategic business sense and easy-going nature were central to her independent star persona, and the control she maintained over her career was a challenge to the "paternalistic structure" of the studio system.

Lombard was particularly noted for the zaniness of her performances, described as a "natural prankster, a salty tongued straight-shooter, a feminist precursor and one of the few stars who was beloved by the technicians and studio functionaries who worked with her". Life magazine noted that her film personality transcended to real life, "her conversation, often brilliant, is punctuated by screeches, laughs, growls, gesticulations and the expletives of a sailor's parrot". Graham Greene praised the "heartbreaking and nostalgic melodies" of her faster-than-thought delivery, whereas The Independent wrote "Platinum blonde, with a heart-shaped face, delicate, impish features and a figure made to be swathed in silver lamé, Lombard wriggled expressively through such classics of hysteria as Twentieth Century and My Man Godfrey."

In 1999, the American Film Institute ranked Lombard 23rd on its list of the 25 greatest American female screen legends of classic Hollywood cinema, and she has a star on the Hollywood Walk of Fame at 6930 Hollywood Blvd. Lombard received one Academy Award for Best Actress nomination for My Man Godfrey. Actresses who have portrayed her in films include Jill Clayburgh in Gable and Lombard (1976), Sharon Gless in Moviola: The Scarlett O'Hara War (1980), Denise Crosby in Malice in Wonderland (1985), Anastasia Hille in RKO 281 (1999) and Vanessa Gray in Lucy (2003). Lombard's Fort Wayne childhood home has been designated a historic landmark. The city named the nearby bridge over the St. Mary's River the Carole Lombard Memorial Bridge.

Lombard's star at the Hollywood Walk of Fame is shown in the film Pretty Woman.

== Awards and nominations ==
Year	Organization	Category	Work	Result	Ref.
1937	Academy Awards	Best Actress	My Man Godfrey	Nominated	
1946	U.S. Treasury Award for Patriotic Service (Note: A number of internet sites claim that President Franklin D. Roosevelt "posthumously awarded Lombard the Medal of Freedom" in 1942. This is patently untrue as neither the Medal of Freedom nor the Presidential Medal of Freedom (1963) existed in 1942. Furthermore, Roosevelt never awarded anyone the Medal of Freedom as he died on April 12, 1945, and the award wasn't established until July 6, 1945 (by President Harry S. Truman).)	—N/a	—N/a	Honored	
1960	Hollywood Walk of Fame	Star - Motion Pictures	—N/a	Honored	
