= Wayna Potosí =

Mountain in Bolivia

- Location within Bolivia

Highest point
- Elevation: 4,969 m (16,302 ft)
- Coordinates: 18°4′33″S 68°19′47″W

Geography
- Location: Bolivia, Oruro Department
- Parent range: Andes

Wayna Potosí (Aymara and Quechua wayna young, Hispanicized spelling Huayna Potosí) is a mountain in the Andes of Bolivia, about 4,969 metres (16,302 ft) high.

== Location ==
It is located in the Oruro Department, Sajama Province, Turku Municipality, Turku Canton, northwest of Turku (Turco). The Turku River originates near the mountain. It is a left tributary of the Lauca River.

== See also ==
- Asu Asuni
- Kunturiri
- Sajama
- Sajama National Park
- List of mountains in the Andes
