= Potosi, Nevada =

Ghost town in Clark County, NV, US

Potosi or Potosi Camp, was called Crystal City in the 1870s, a mining ghost town in Clark County, Nevada. It lies at an elevation of 5705 feet.

== History ==
The Potosi Mine 35°57′44″N 115°32′12″W is thought to be the site of the oldest lode mine in Nevada. Its lead deposits were discovered in 1847 but it was not until 1856 that Mormon miners from their colony of Las Vegas Springs began a lead mine there. Operations ceased in 1857 after 9,000 lbs of lead were extracted due to difficulties in smelting the ore.

Nothing further was done with the mine until 1861. That year the Colorado Mining Company, began to mine silver in the Potosi Mine. They first set up a large smelter at Potosi Spring 35°58′14″N 115°32′28″W and established Potosi as its mining camp. Potosi had a population of 100 until mining ceased there in 1863.

After the Salt Lake and San Pedro Railroad was built through Clark County in 1905, it became possible to mine zinc in the Potosi Mine. From 1906 to 1928, zinc was mined there.

== Today ==
The site of Potosi appears barren of ruins.
