= Zincobotryogen =

Hydrous sulfate mineral

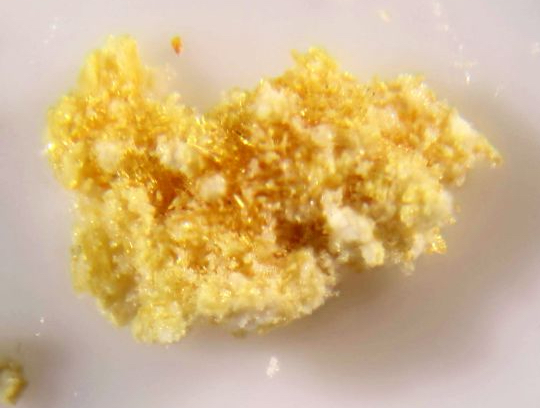

General
- Category: Minerals
- Formula: (Zn,Mg,Mn)Fe^{3+}(SO_{4})_{2}(OH)·7H_{2}O
- IMA symbol: Zbyg
- Crystal system: Monoclinic
- Space group: P2_{1}/n (no. 14)

Identification
- Mohs scale hardness: 2.5
- Specific gravity: 2.201

Zincobotryogen is a hydrous sulfate mineral with the chemical formula (Zn,Mg,Mn)Fe^{3+}(SO_{4})_{2}(OH)·7H_{2}O. It forms bright orange red monoclinic prismatic crystals that exhibit a vitreous to greasy luster. Its specific gravity is 2.201 and it has a Mohs hardness of 2.5.

It is a rare secondary mineral which forms in arid climates by alteration of other zinc minerals. It was named for its zinc content and it relationship to botryogen. It has been reported from the Xitieshan Mine, Qinghai, Northwest Region, China; Rammelsberg mine, near Goslar, Harz Mountains, Germany; the Bisbee district of Arizona and various mines in Colorado.
