= Chunkarani =

Mountain in the bolivian Andes

- Location within Bolivia

Highest point
- Elevation: 5,076 m (16,654 ft)
- Coordinates: 18°08′15″S 68°28′15″W

Geography
- Location: Bolivia, Oruro Department, Sajama Province
- Parent range: Andes

Chunkarani (Aymara chunkara pointed mountain, -ni a suffix to indicate ownership, "the one with a pointed mountain", Hispanicized spelling Chungarani) is a 5,076-metre-high (16,654 ft) mountain in the Andes of Bolivia. It lies in the Oruro Department, Sajama Province, on the border of the Curahuara de Carangas Municipality and the Turco Municipality. Chunkarani is situated north-east of the volcanic complex of Asu Asuni.
