= Potosi Mountain (Nevada) =

Mountain in Clark County, Nevada, United States

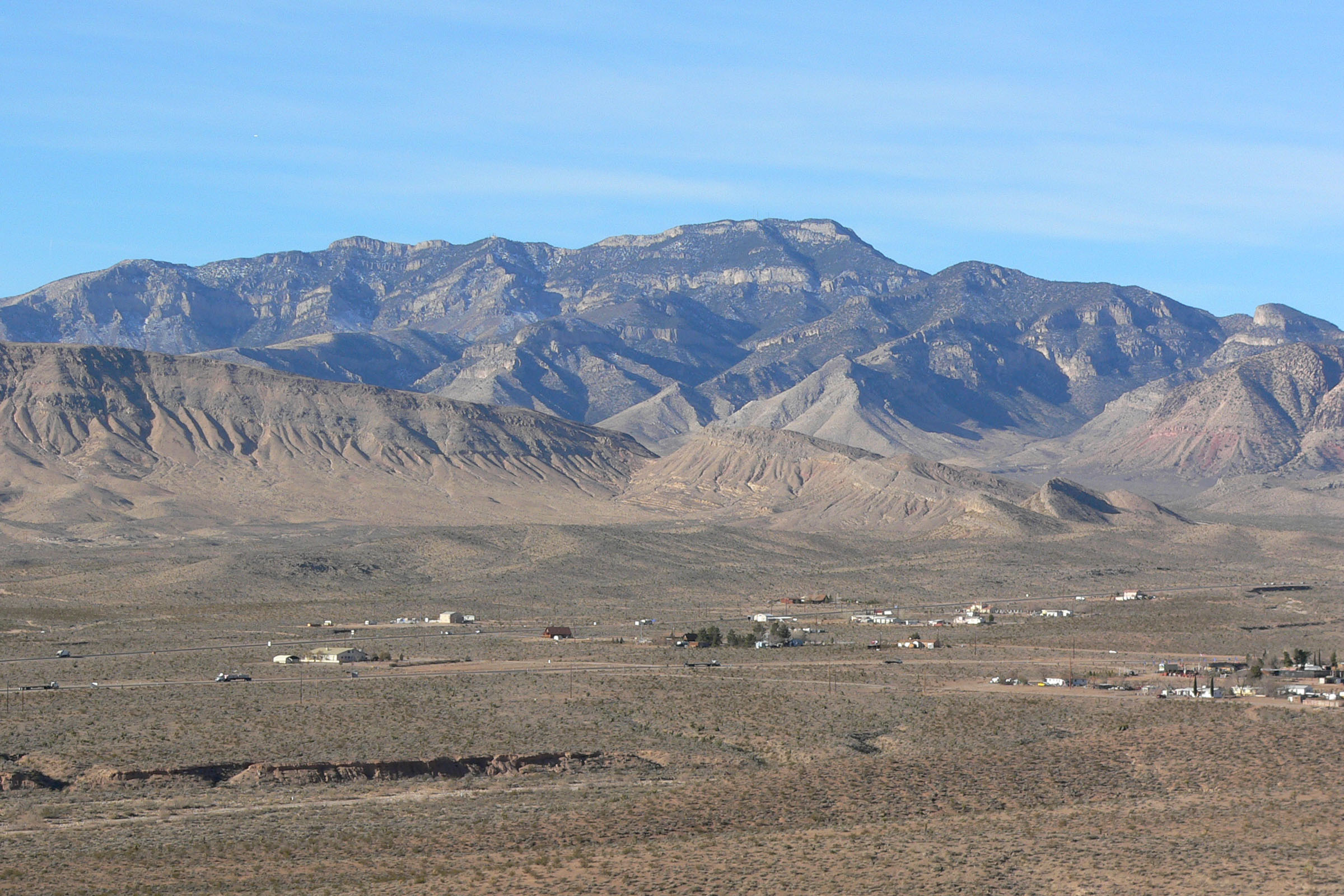
- View from the east

Highest point
- Elevation: 8,517 ft (2,596 m) NAVD 88
- Prominence: 3,012 ft (918 m)
- Coordinates: 35°57′56″N 115°30′06″W

Geography
- Location: Clark County, Nevada, U.S.
- Parent range: Spring Mountains
- Topo map: USGS Potosi

Potosi Mountain is approximately 30 miles (50 km) southwest of Las Vegas in the Spring Mountains of Clark County, Nevada, United States. It is also called Double Up Mountain and Olcott Peak. Its main bedrock is limestone.

== History ==
The giant cave of Potosi Mountain was used for vision quests by the Chemehuevi shaman of the mid-19th century.

Spanish missionaries may have opened silver mines here, but there is no good documentation of that. In 1855, Mormon settlers found rich lead and other metal ore. The Mormon mine manager probably named the mine after his childhood home, Potosi, Wisconsin, another mining town, itself named (directly or indirectly) after the Bolivian mountain Cerro Potosí, the richest silver mine known.

The Potosi Mining District on the west of the mountain produced lead and silver.

Potosi Mountain was the site of the TWA Flight 3 air crash that killed 3 crew members and 19 passengers, notably the actress Carole Lombard, on January 16, 1942.

== Potosi Mountain broadcasting facility ==
Potosi Mountain serves as a major FM broadcast transmitter site for Las Vegas, with 7 full power FM stations transmitting from the top of Potosi, along with 1 FM Translator. The stations are KNPR 88.9, KCNV 89.7, KOMP 92.3, KVGK 93.1, and KXPT 97.1 all licensed to Las Vegas, KVPH 104.3 licensed to North Las Vegas, and KXTE 107.5, licensed to Pahrump, Nevada. A translator, K276BL, also operates from up here on 103.1, simulcasting KSOS 90.5 from Las Vegas. KXTE was the first tenant to broadcast from the top of the mountain and the first station in the United States to transmit in HD Digital.

There is also an amateur television repeater, with the call sign N7ZEV, located here.

Along with FM transmitters, NOAA All Hazards Radio station WNG634 on 162.400 MHz, which is managed by the National Weather Service forecasting office in Las Vegas, NV, is located here as well.

== See also ==
- List of mountains of Nevada
