= Jitiri =

- Location within Bolivia

Highest point
- Elevation: 4,506 m (14,783 ft)
- Coordinates: 18°13′29″S 68°47′01″W

Geography
- Location: Bolivia; Oruro Department, Sajama Province, Turco Municipality
- Parent range: Andes, Cordillera Occidental

Jitiri is a 4,506-metre-high (14,783 ft) volcano in the Andes, located in the Cordillera Occidental of Bolivia in the Oruro Department, Sajama Province, Turco Municipality, Cosapa Canton. It is situated south-east of the extinct Sajama volcano, between the volcano Chullkani in the south-west and the village Cosapa in the north-east.

== See also ==
- Asu Asuni
- Laram Q'awa
- Kunturiri
- Uyarani
