= Asu Asuni =

- Location within Bolivia

Highest point
- Elevation: 5,088 m (16,693 ft)
- Coordinates: 18°13′13″S 68°31′20″W

Geography
- Location: Bolivia; Oruro Department, Sajama Province, Turco Municipality
- Parent range: Andes, Cordillera Occidental

Asu Asuni (Aymara asu newborn creature, the reduplication signifies there is a group or a complex of something, -ni a nominal suffix to indicate ownership, "the one with some newborn creatures") is a 5,088-metre-high (16,693 ft) mountain in a volcanic complex in the Cordillera Occidental in the Andes of Bolivia. It is located in the Oruro Department, Sajama Province, Turco Municipality, Turco Canton. It is situated southeast of the extinct Sajama volcano (3 km), between the Chullkani volcano in the west (3 km) and Turco in the east, at the National Route 27.

== See also ==
- Jitiri
- Laram Q'awa
- Kunturiri (Bolivia-Chile)
- Kunturiri (Sajama)
- Uyarani
