= Potosi Mining District =

Historic district in Nevada, United States

Coordinates: 35°58′15″N 115°32′27″W

- Potosi
- U.S. National Register of Historic Places
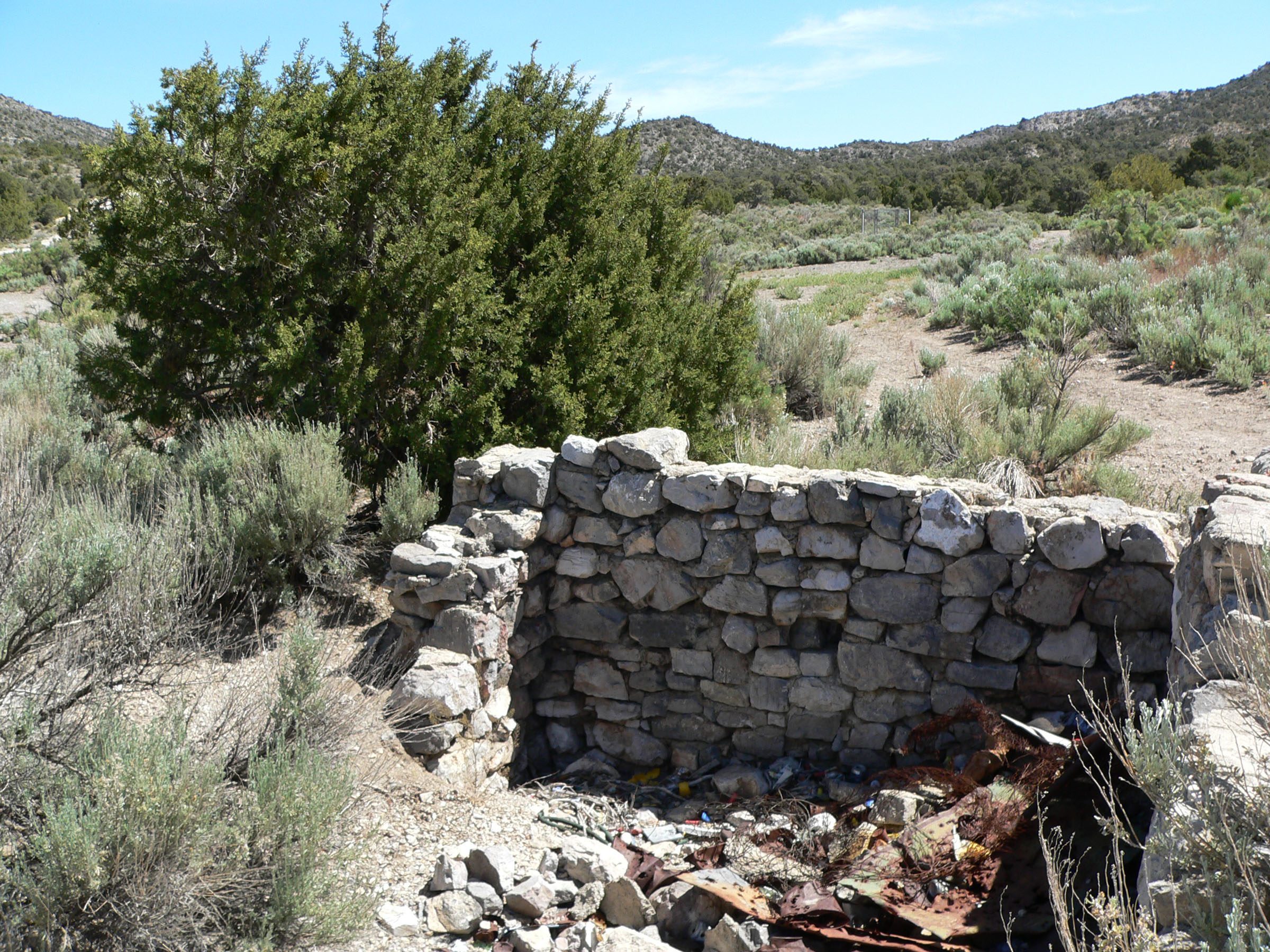
- Ruins near Potosi Spring
- Interactive map of Potosi
- Location: S of Las Vegas off I-15 near Potosi Pass
- Nearest city: Las Vegas, Nevada
- Area: 9,600 acres (3,900 ha)
- MPS: Site
- NRHP reference No.: 74001144
- Added to NRHP: November 13, 1974

The Potosi Mining District, or Potosi, was an area in Clark County of southern Nevada, U.S. It is listed on the National Register of Historic Places and includes three structures. The town was named after the famous silver-mining city of Potosi, Bolivia.

== History ==
The mines in the area produced gold, silver, zinc, platinum, copper, palladium, cobalt, nickel, and antimony. A small amount of carnotite (a vanadium-uranium mineral) was also discovered, but not mined.

== Geography ==
The site of Potosi or Potosi Camp is at an elevation of 5,705 feet (1,739 m) above sea level.

== Included mines ==
Potosi mining district was a part of the Goodsprings Mining District and included the following mines:

- Christmas Mine
- Dawn Mine
- Green Monster Mine
- Kirby Mine
- New Year Mine
- Shenandoah Mine
- Ninetynine Mine

== See also ==
- Potosi Mountain
